= Ottoman Empire in World War I =

The Ottoman Empire was one of the Central Powers of World War I, allied with the German Empire, Austria-Hungary, and Bulgaria. It entered the war on 29 October 1914 with a small surprise attack on Russian ports in the Black Sea, prompting the Russian Empire—and its allies France and Great Britain—to declare war the following month.

World War I had erupted almost exactly three months prior, on 28 July, following a series of interrelated diplomatic and military escalations among the major powers of Europe triggered by the assassination of Archduke Franz Ferdinand, heir presumptive to the Austro-Hungarian throne, by Bosnian Serb nationalist Gavrilo Princip. The Ottoman Empire, which had no stake in the immediate causes and considerations of the conflict, declared neutrality and negotiated with nations on both sides.

Though regarded by the great powers as the "sick man of Europe" due to its perceived decline and weakness, the empire's geostrategic location and continued influence had nonetheless made it a critical consideration in any potential conflict. Decades of close economic, diplomatic, and military ties with Germany, among other factors, culminated in its decision to enter the war on the side of the German-led Central Powers.

The Ottomans were substantial contributors to the war effort. Though consistently plagued by logistical, technological, and technical limitations, they managed to mobilize over 3 million men, having started the war with only about 210,000. Ottoman forces fought in the Balkans and Middle Eastern theatres of the war, holding down large numbers of Entente troops. They were a leading and decisive participant in the Caucasus, Gallipoli, and Sinai and Palestine campaigns, and dominated the South Caucasus.

The Ottoman Empire's defeat in the war in 1918 was crucial in the eventual dissolution of the empire in 1922.

== Entry into World War I ==
The Ottoman entry into World War I was the direct result of two recently purchased ships of its navy, still manned by their German crews and commanded by their German admiral, carrying out the Black Sea Raid on 29 October 1914. There were a number of factors that conspired to influence the Ottoman government and encourage them to enter the war. The political reasons for the Ottoman sultan's entry into the war are disputed, and the Ottoman Empire was an agricultural state in an age of industrial warfare. Also, the economic resources of the empire were depleted by the cost of the Balkan Wars of 1912 and 1913. The reasons for the Ottoman action were not immediately clear.

=== Declaration of jihad ===
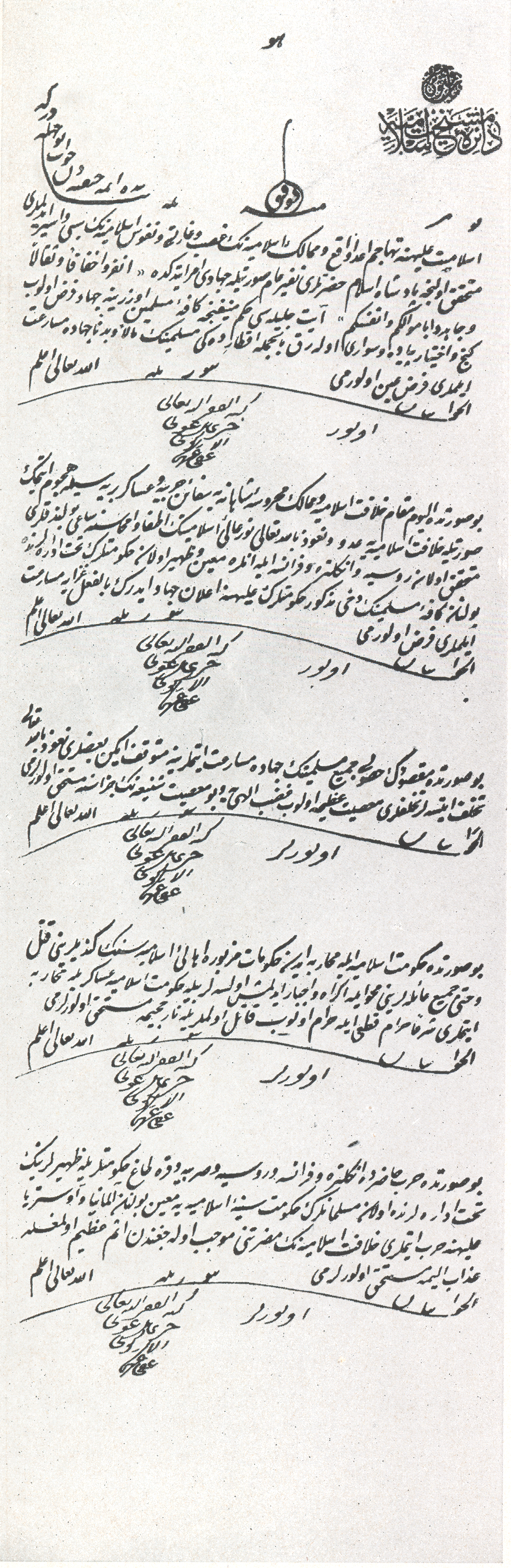
Declaration of war by the Ottoman Empire on the Entente

On 11 November 1914, (Note: Using the Rumi calendar, the declaration was dated 29 Teşrin-i Evvel 1330.) Mehmed V, Sultan of the Ottoman Caliphate, declared Jihad (meritorious struggle or effort) against the powers of the Triple Entente during World War I. The declaration, which called for Muslims to support the Ottomans in Entente-controlled areas and for jihad against "all enemies of the Ottoman Empire, except the Central Powers", was initially drafted on 11 November and first publicly read out in front of a large crowd on 14 November. That same day, a fatwa (Islamic religious decree) to the same effect was declared by the Fetva Emini ("fatwa consultant", the Ottoman official in charge of dictating tafsir on behalf of the Shaykh al-Islām).

Arab tribes in Mesopotamia were initially enthusiastic about the edict. However, following British victories in the Mesopotamian campaign in 1914 and 1915, enthusiasm declined, and some chieftains like Mudbir al-Far'un adopted a more neutral, if not pro-British, stance.

There were hopes and fears that non-Turkish Muslims would side with Ottoman Turkey, but according to some historians, the appeal did not "[unite] the Muslim world", and Muslims did not turn on their non-Muslim commanders in the Allied forces. However, other historians point to the 1915 Singapore Mutiny and alleged that the call did have a considerable impact on Muslims around the world. In a 2017 article, it was concluded that the declaration, as well as earlier jihad propaganda, had a strong impact on attaining the loyalty of Kurdish tribes, who played a major role in the Armenian and Assyrian genocides.

The war led to the end of the caliphate as the Ottoman Empire entered on the side of the war's losers and surrendered by agreeing to "viciously punitive" conditions. These were overturned by the popular war hero Mustafa Kemal, who was also a secularist and later abolished the caliphate.

== Military ==
The Ottoman entry into World War I began on 29 October 1914 when it launched the Black Sea Raid against Russian ports. Following the attack, Russia declared war on the Ottoman Empire on 2 November, followed by their allies (Britain and France) declaring war on the Ottoman Empire on 5 November 1914. The Ottoman Empire started military action after three months of formal neutrality, but it had signed a secret alliance with the Central Powers in August 1914.

The great landmass of Anatolia was between the Ottoman army's headquarters in Istanbul and many of the theatres of war. During Abdul Hamid II's reign, civilian communications had improved, but the road and rail network was not ready for war. It took more than a month to reach Syria and nearly two months to reach Mesopotamia. To reach the border with Russia, the railway ran only 60 km east of Ankara, and from there, it was 35 days to Erzurum. The Army used Trabzon port as a logistical shortcut to the east. It took less time to arrive at any of those fronts from London than from the Ottoman War Department because of the poor condition of Ottoman supply ships.

The empire fell into disorder with the declaration of war along with Germany. On 11 November, a conspiracy was discovered in Constantinople against Germans and the Committee of Union and Progress (CUP) in which some of the CUP leaders were shot. That followed the 12 November revolt in Adrianople against the German military mission. On 13 November, a bomb exploded in Enver Pasha's palace, which killed five German officers but failed to kill Enver Pasha. On 18 November there were more anti-German plots. Committees formed around the country to rid the country of those who sided with Germany. Army and navy officers protested against the assumption of authority by Germans. On 4 December, widespread riots took place throughout the country. On 13 December, an anti-war demonstration was led by women in Konak (Izmir) and Erzurum. Throughout December, the CUP dealt with mutiny among soldiers in barracks and among naval crews. The head of the German Military Mission, Field Marshal von der Goltz, survived a conspiracy against his life.

Military power remained firmly in the hands of War Minister Enver Pasha, domestic issues (civil matters) were under Interior Minister Talat Pasha, and Cemal Pasha had sole control over Ottoman Syria. Provincial governors ran their regions with differing degrees of autonomy. An interesting case is Izmir; Rahmi Bey behaved almost as if his region was a neutral zone between the warring states.

=== War with Russia ===
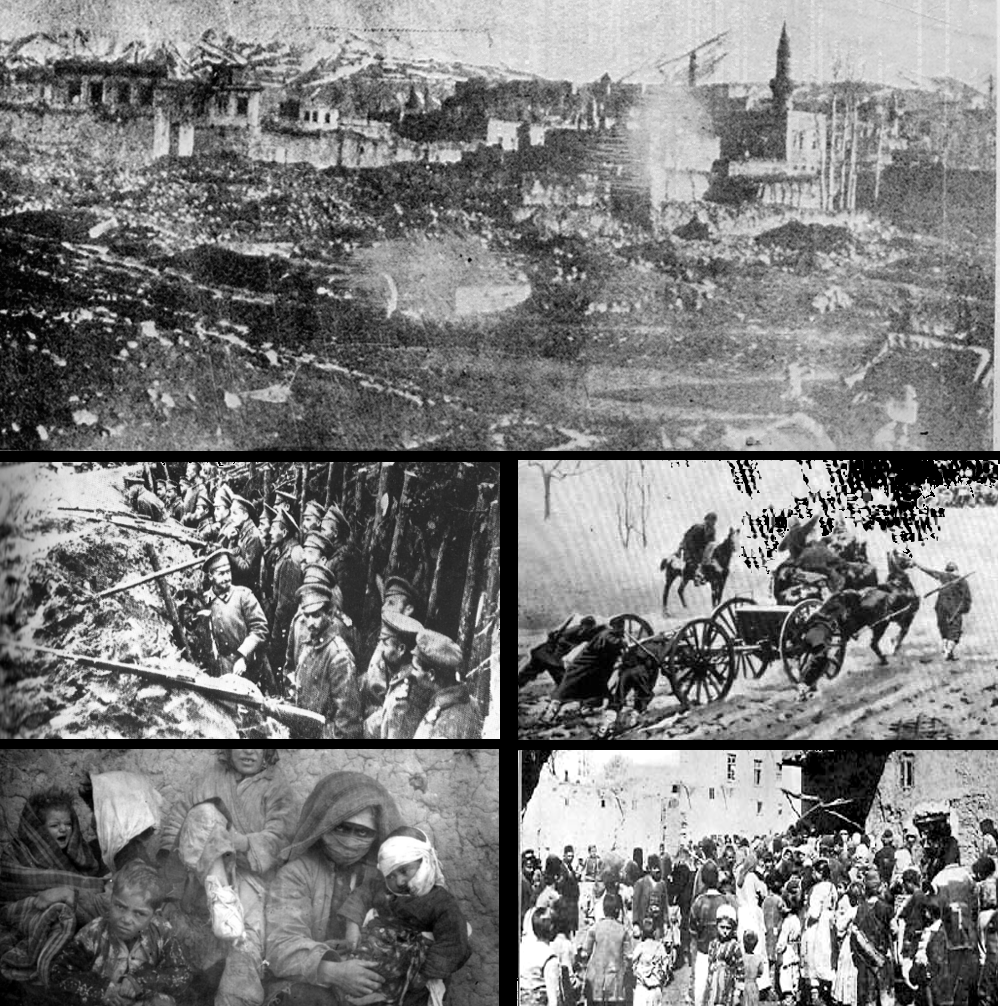
Top: Destruction in the city of Erzurum; Left Upper: Russian forces; Left Lower: Wounded Muslim refugees; Right Upper: Ottoman forces; Right Lower: Armenian refugees

The Ottoman's entrance into the war greatly increased the Triple Entente's military burdens. Russia had to fight alone on the Caucasus Campaign but fought with the United Kingdom on the Persian Campaign. Enver Pasha set off for the Battle of Sarikamish with the intention of recapturing Batum and Kars, overrunning Georgia and occupying north-western Persia and the oil fields. Fighting the Russians in the Caucasus, however, the Ottomans lost ground, and over 100,000 soldiers, in a series of battles. 60,000 Ottoman soldiers died in the winter of 1916–17 on the Mus—Bitlis section of the front. The Ottomans preferred to keep the Caucasus militarily silent as they had to regroup reserves to retake Baghdad and Palestine from the British. 1917 and the first half of 1918 was the time for negotiations. On 5 December 1917, the armistice of Erzincan (Erzincan Cease-fire Agreement) was signed between the Russians and Ottomans in Erzincan that ended the armed conflicts between Russia and Ottoman Empire. On 3 March, the Grand vizier Talat Pasha signed the Treaty of Brest-Litovsk with the Russian SFSR. It stipulated that Bolshevik Russia cede Batum, Kars, and Ardahan. In addition to these provisions, a secret clause was inserted which obligated the Russians to demobilize Armenian national forces.

From 14 March to April 1918 the Trabzon peace conference was held between the Ottoman Empire and the delegation of the Transcaucasian Diet. Enver Pasha offered to surrender all ambitions in the Caucasus in return for recognition of the Ottoman reacquisition of the east Anatolian provinces at Brest-Litovsk at the end of the negotiations. On 5 April, the head of the Transcaucasian delegation Akaki Chkhenkeli accepted the Treaty of Brest-Litovsk as a basis for more negotiations and wired the governing bodies urging them to accept this position. The mood prevailing in Tiflis was very different. Tiflis acknowledge the existence of a state of war between themselves and the Ottoman Empire.

In April 1918, the Ottoman 3rd Army finally went on the offensive in Armenia. Opposition from Armenian forces led to the Battle of Sardarapat, the Battle of Kara Killisse, and the Battle of Bash Abaran. On 28 May 1918, the Armenian National Council based in Tiflis declared the First Republic of Armenia. The new Republic of Armenia was forced to sign the Treaty of Batum.

In July 1918, the Ottomans faced the Centrocaspian Dictatorship at the Battle of Baku, with the goal of taking Armenian/Russian/British occupied Baku on the Caspian Sea.

War in the Caucasus and Persia

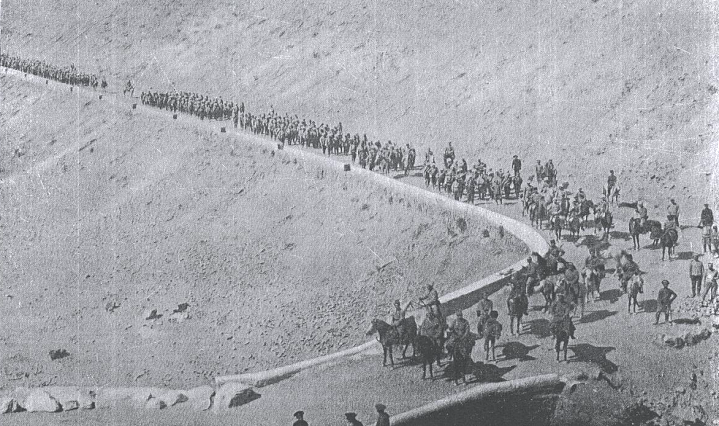
1st battalion of the Armenian volunteer unit. It was under the command of the Andranik during Persian Campaign.

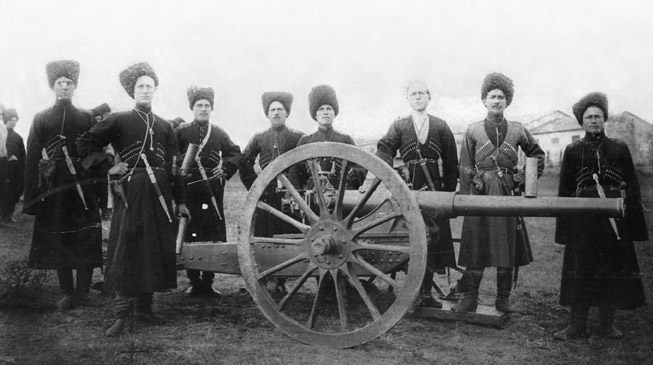
Terek Cossacks under Nikolai Baratov, Russian Caucasus Army

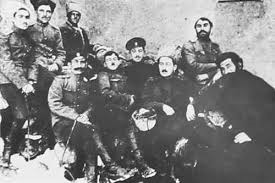
5th Infantry Regiment officers of the Battle of Sardarabad

=== War with Britain ===
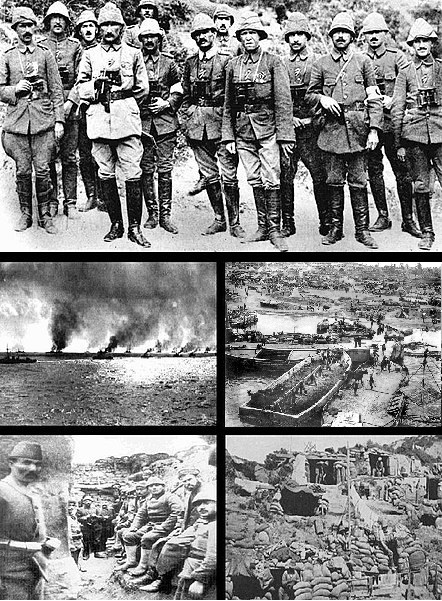
February–April 1915, The Battle of Gallipoli

The British captured Basra in November 1914, and marched north into Iraq. Initially Ahmed Cemal Pasha was ordered to gather an army in Palestine to threaten the Suez Canal. In response, the Allies—including the newly formed Australian and New Zealand Army Corps ("ANZACs")—opened another front with the Battle of Gallipoli. The army led by Ahmed Djemal Pasha (Fourth Army) to eject the British from Egypt was stopped at the Suez Canal in February 1915, and again the next summer. The canal was vital to the British war effort. In addition, the 1915 locust plague broke out in the Palestine region; the Ottoman military hospitals record the period as March–October 1915.

The expected, and feared, British invasion came not through Cilicia or northern Syria, but through the straits. The aim of the Dardanelles campaign was to support Russia. Most military observers recognized that the uneducated Ottoman soldier was lost without good leadership, and at Gallipoli Mustafa Kemal realized the capabilities of his men if their officers led from the front.

Great Britain was obliged to defend India and the southern Persian oil territory by undertaking the Mesopotamian campaign. Britain also had to protect Egypt in the Sinai-Palestine-Syria Campaign. These campaigns strained Allied resources and relieved Germany.

The repulse of British forces in Palestine in the spring of 1917 was followed by the loss of Jerusalem in December of the same year. The Ottoman authorities deported the entire civilian population of Jaffa, pursuant to orders from Cemal Pasha on 6 April 1917. While the Muslim evacuees were allowed to return shortly after, the Jewish deportees were unable to until after the war. The events occurred simultaneously with the formation of the Balfour Declaration (published on 2 November 1917) in which the British Government declared its support for the establishment of a homeland for the Jewish people in Palestine.

The Ottomans were eventually defeated due to key attacks by the British general Edmund Allenby.

War in Mesopotamia, Sinai and Palestine and Gallipoli

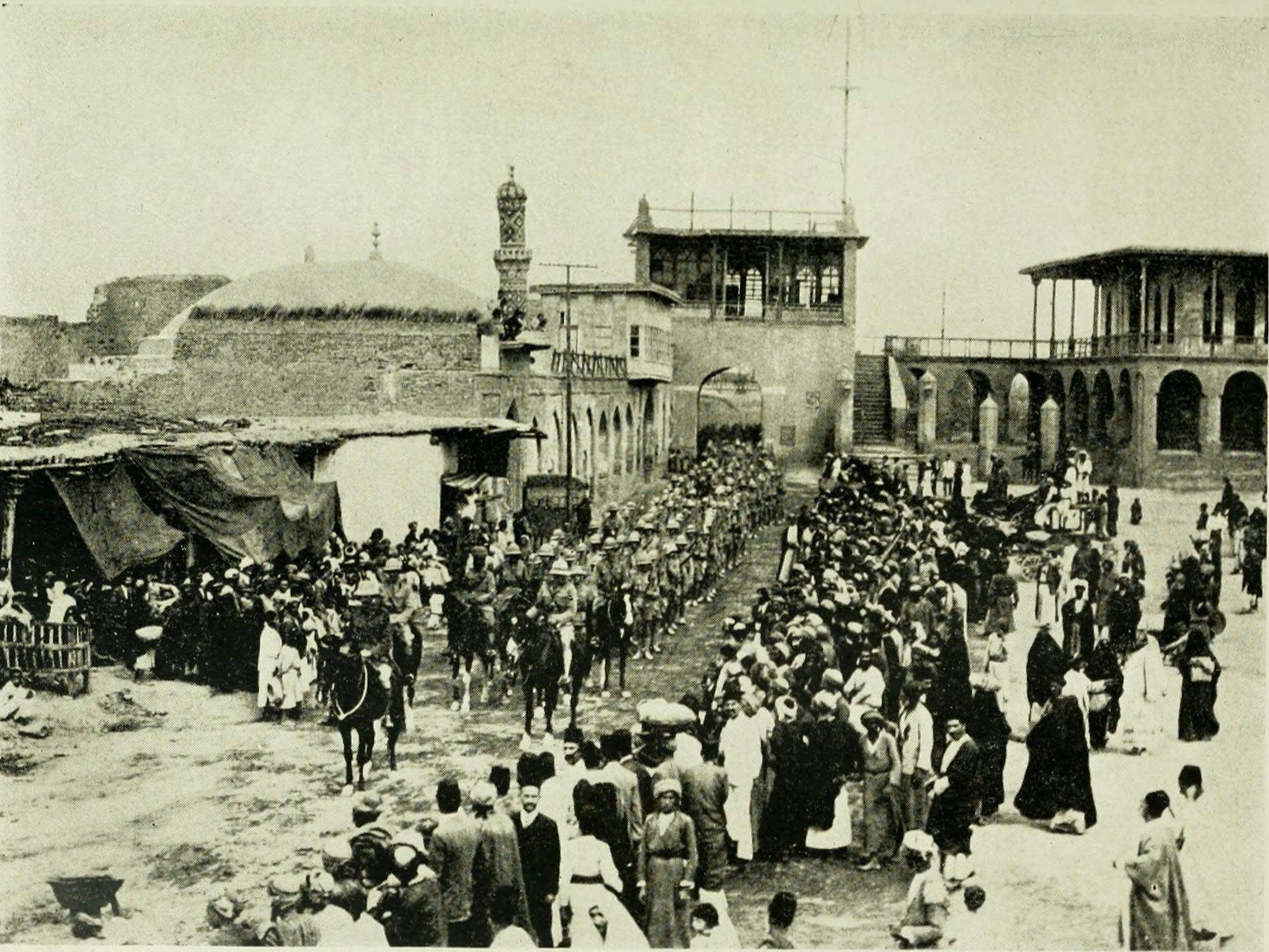
British troops entering Baghdad March 1917

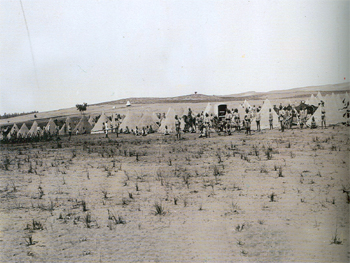
6th Army field HQ

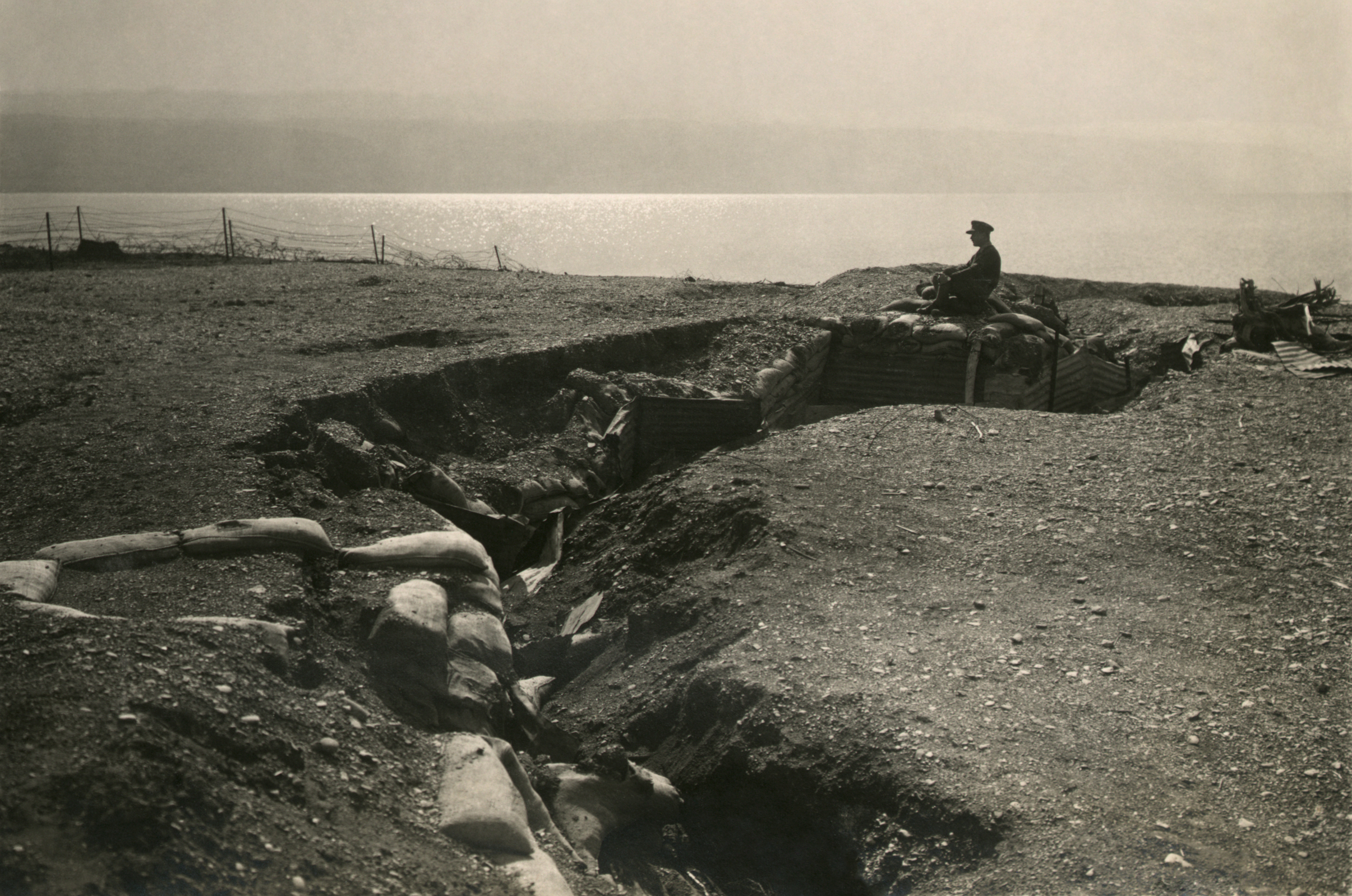
In 1917, Ottoman forces at the shores of the Dead Sea

=== The Home Front ===
The war tested to the limit the empire's relations with its Arab population. In February 1915 in Syria, Cemal Pasha exercised absolute power in both military and civil affairs. Cemal Pasha was convinced that an uprising among local Arabs was imminent. Leading Arabs were executed, and notable families deported to Anatolia. Cemal's policies did nothing to alleviate the famine that was gripping Syria; it was exacerbated by a British and French blockade of the coastal ports, the requisitioning of transports, profiteering and—strikingly—Cemal's preference for spending scarce funds on public works and the restoration of historic monuments. During the war, Britain had been a major sponsor of Arab nationalist thought and ideology, primarily as a weapon to use against the power of the Empire. Sharif Hussein ibn Ali rebelled against the Ottoman rule during the Arab Revolt of 1916. In August he was replaced by Sharif Haydar, but in October he proclaimed himself king of Arabia and in December was recognized by the British as an independent ruler. There was little the Empire could do to influence the course of events, other than try to prevent news of the uprising spreading to keep it from demoralizing the army or acting as propaganda for anti-Ottoman Arab factions. On 3 October 1918 forces of the Arab Revolt entered Damascus accompanied by British troops, ending 400 years of Ottoman rule.

Desertion also became an important issue for the war effort. Low morale from a lack of supplies and the nature of the fighting meant many soldiers abandoned their posts and turned to banditry, some bands at some point controlling large swaths of land behind the front lines. In the autumn-winter of 1916, deserting troops from the Mesopotamian front took control of central Iraqi cities and expelled the bureaucrats.

Home front

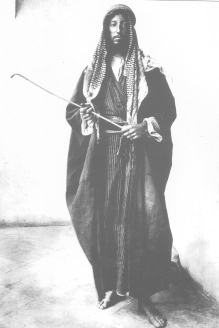
Lt. Col. Gerard Leachman disguised as a Bedouin.

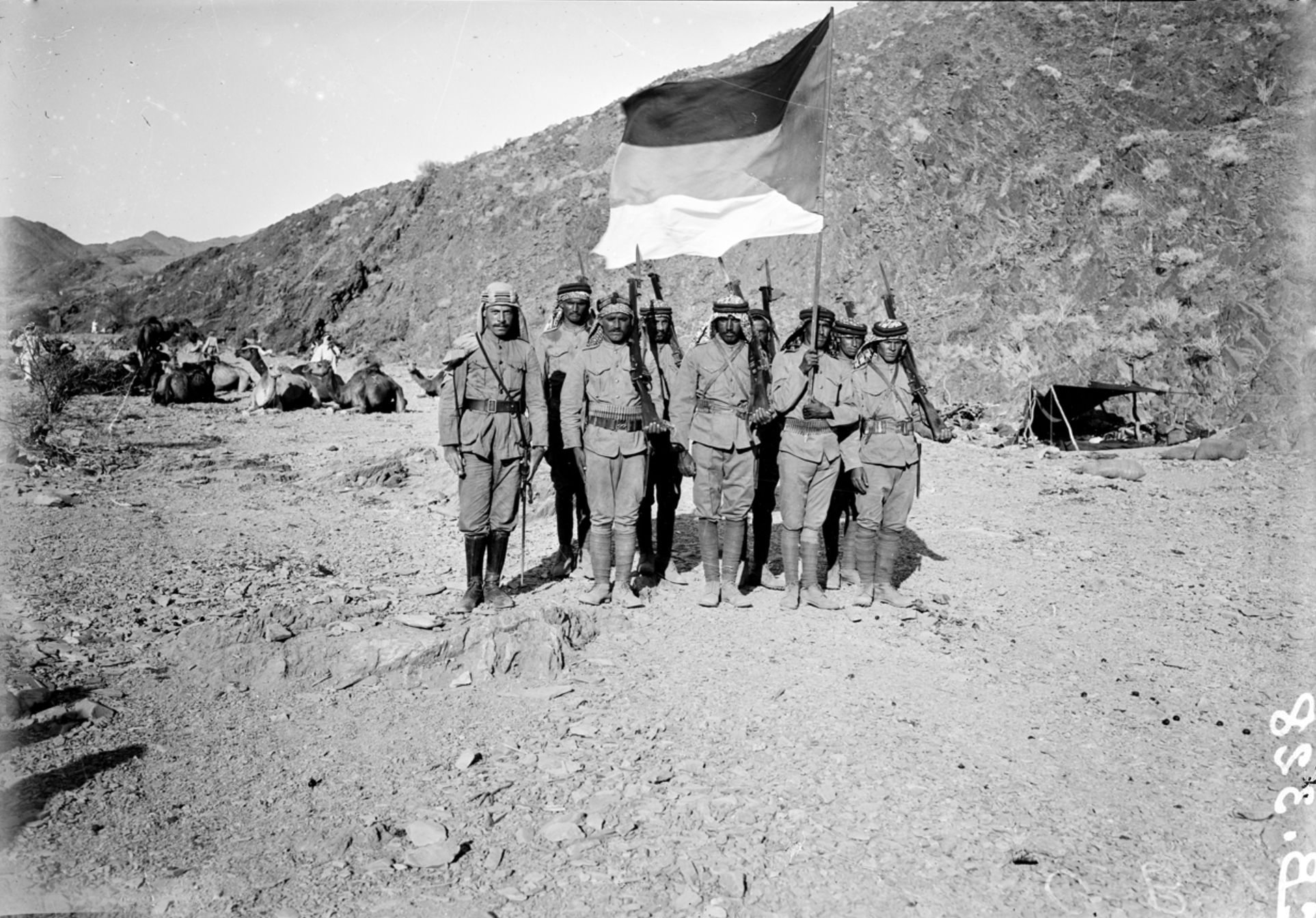
Soldiers of the Sharif of Mecca carrying the Arab Flag during the Arab Revolt of 1916–1918

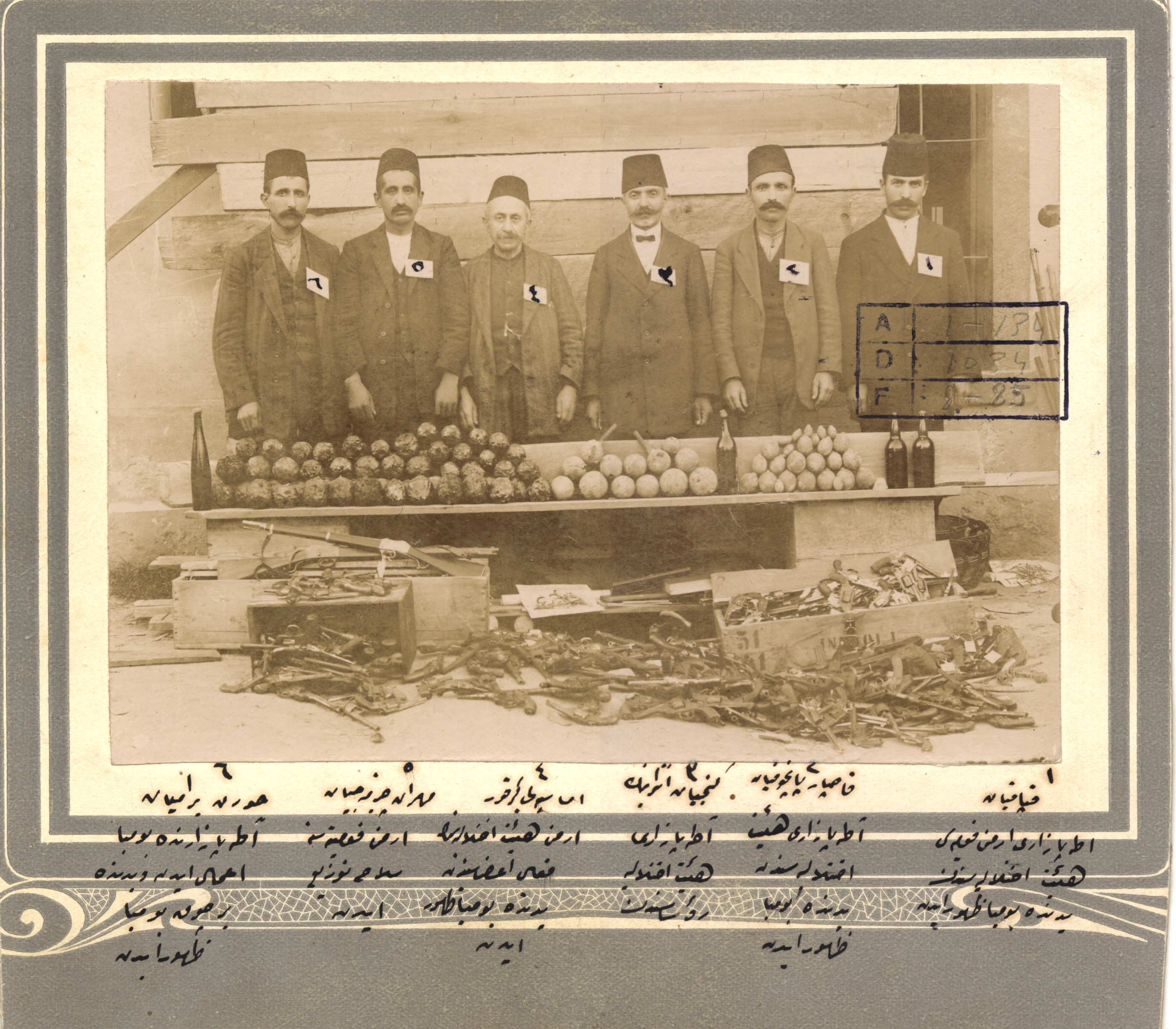
Resistance members from the Adapazarı committee, 1915.

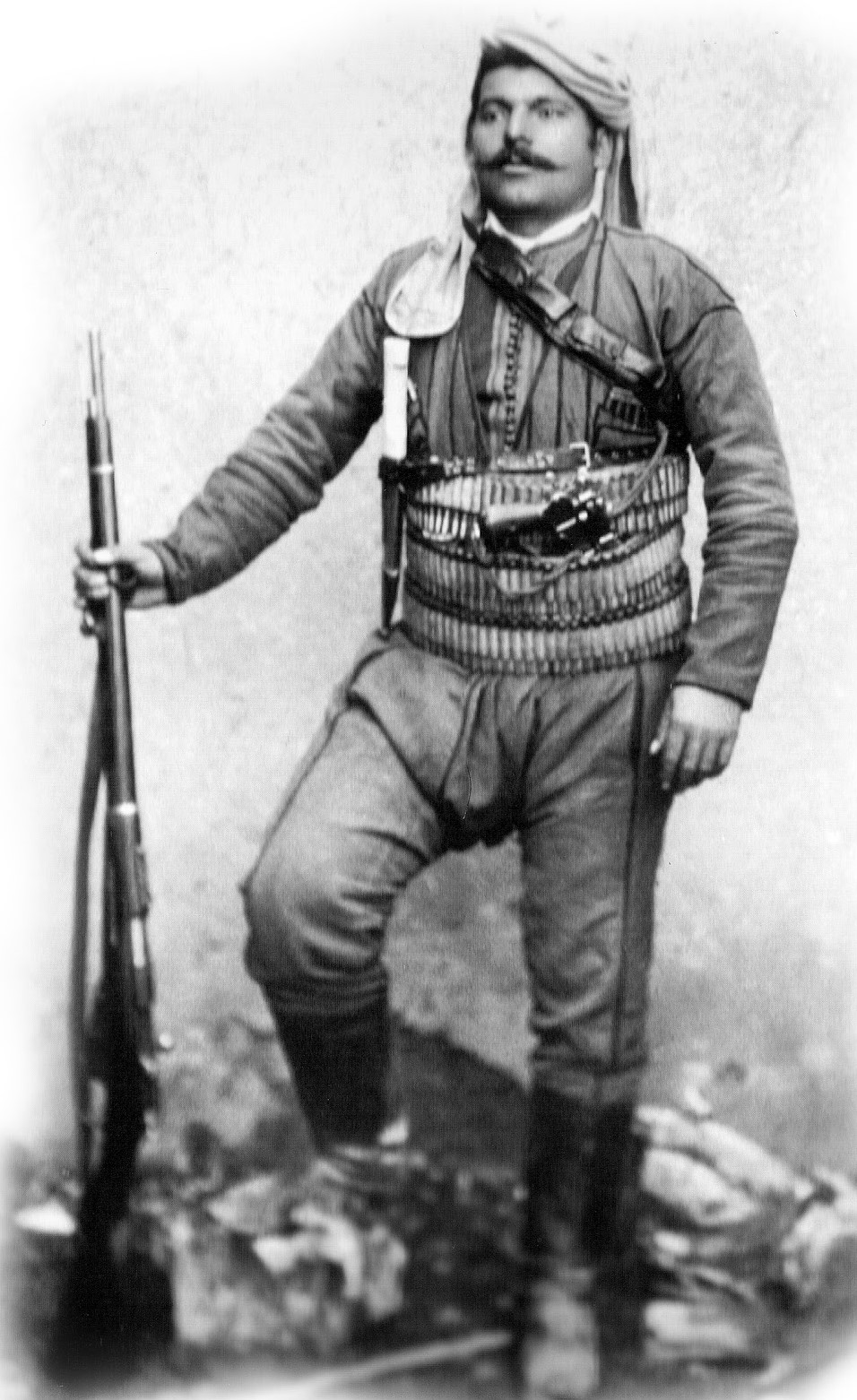
Murad of Sebastia and his comrades fought at Sivas during 1915

=== War in Eastern Europe ===
In order to support the other Central Powers, Enver Pasha sent 3 Army Corps or around 100,000 men to fight in Eastern Europe.

- VI Corps under command of Mustafa Hilmi Pasha participated in the Romanian Campaign between September 1916 and April 1918.
- XV Corps under command of Yakup Şevki Subaşı and later Cevat Pasha fought in Galicia against the Russians between August 1916 and August 1917.
- XX Corps under command of Abdul Kerim Pasha participated in the Salonika Campaign between December 1916 and May 1917.
  - The Rumeli Field Detachment (reinforced 177th Infantry Regiment) remained in Macedonia until May 1918.

== Economy ==
=== 1915 ===
On 10 September 1915, Interior Minister Talat Pasha abolished the "Capitulations". On 10 September 1915 Grand Vizier Said Halim Pasha annulled (Vizier had the authority on annuls) the Capitulations, which ended the special privileges they granted to foreign nationals. The capitulation holders refused to recognize his action (unilateral action). The American ambassador expressed the Great Power view:

The capitulary regime, as it exists in the Empire, is not an autonomous institution of the Empire, but the result of international treaties, of diplomatic agreements and of contractual acts of various sorts. The regime, consequently, cannot be modified in any of its parts and still less suppressed in its entirety by the Ottoman Government except in consequence of an understanding with the contracting Powers.

— Henry Morgenthau, Sr.

Beside the capitulations, there was another issue which evolved under the shadow of capitulations. The debt and financial control (revenue generation) of the empire was intertwined under single institution, which its board was constituted from Great Powers rather than Ottomans. There is no sovereignty in this design. The public debt could and did interfere in state affairs because it controlled (collected) one-quarter of state revenues. The debt was administered by the Ottoman Public Debt Administration and its power extended to the Imperial Ottoman Bank (equates to modern central banks). The council had power over every financial affair. Its control extended to determine the tax on livestock in districts. Ottoman public debt was part of a larger scheme of political control, through which the commercial interests of the world had sought to gain advantages that may not be to Empire's interest. The immediate purpose of the abolition of capitulations and the cancellation of foreign debt repayments was to reduce the foreign stranglehold on the Ottoman economy; a second purpose – and one to which great political weight was attached – was to extirpate non-Muslims from the economy by transferring assets to Muslim Turks and encouraging their participation with government contracts and subsidies.

== Foreign relations ==
The Ottoman–German Alliance was ratified on 2 August 1914, shortly following the outbreak of World War I. The alliance was created as part of a joint-cooperative effort that would strengthen and modernize the failing Ottoman military, as well as provide Germany safe passage into neighboring British colonies. On November 1914, British forces invalidated the Anglo-Ottoman Convention, declaring Kuwait to be an "independent sheikdom under British protectorate."

=== 1915 ===
The Constantinople Agreement on 18 March 1915 was a set of secret assurances, which Great Britain promised to give the Capital and the Dardanelles to the Russians in the event of victory. The city of Constantinople was intended to be a free port.

=== 1916 ===
The French-Armenian Agreement of 27 October 1916, was reported to the interior minister, Talat Pasha, which agreement negotiations were performed with the leadership of Boghos Nubar the chairman of the Armenian National Assembly and one of the founder of the AGBU.

=== 1917 ===
In 1917 the Ottoman Cabinet considered maintaining relations with Washington after the United States had declared war on Germany on 6 April. But the views of the war party prevailed and they insisted on maintaining a common front with their allies. Thus, relations with America were broken on 20 April 1917.

==== Russian SFSR ====
The 1917 Russian Revolution changed the realities. The war devastated not only Russian soldiers, but also the Russian economy, which was breaking down under the heightened strain of wartime demand by the end of 1915. The tsarist regime's advances for the security on its southern borders proved ruinous. The tsarist regime's desire to control the Eastern Anatolia and the straits (perceived as an underbelly), in the end created the conditions that brought about Russia's own downfall. Inability to use the Straits significantly disrupted the Russian supply chain, Russia might have survived without the Straits, but the strain was the tipping point for its war economy. This question was left to Soviet historians: "whether a less aggressive policy toward the Ottoman Empire before the war would have caused Istanbul to maintain neutrality or whether Russia later might have induced Istanbul to leave the war, (Note: Sazonov's commitment to a two-front war and disregard for Yudenich's warnings to seek peace with the Ottomans had overstretched Russia.) the outcome of tsarist future would be different. Nicholas's inept handling of his country and the war destroyed the Tsar and ended up costing him both his reign and his life.

Enver immediately instructed Vehib Pasha and the Third Army, to propose a ceasefire to Russia's Caucasus Army. Vehib cautioned withdrawing forces, as due to the politics in Russia—neither Russia's Caucasus Army nor Caucasian civil authorities could give assurances that an armistice would hold. On 7 November 1917 the Bolshevik Party led by Vladimir Lenin overthrew the Provisional Government in a violent coup plunged Russia into multitude of civil wars between different ethnic groups. The slow dissolution of Russia's Caucasus Army relieved one form of military threat from the east but brought another one. Russia was a long time threat, but at the same time kept the civil unrest in his land at bay without spreading to Ottomans in a violent. On 3 December the Ottoman foreign minister Ahmed Nesimi Bey informed the Chamber of Deputies about the prospects. The Chamber discussed the possible outcomes and priorities. On 15 December Armistice between Russia and the Central Powers signed. On 18 December Armistice of Erzincan signed. The Bolsheviks' anti-imperialist formula of peace with no annexations and no indemnities was close to Ottoman position. The Bolsheviks' position brought a conflict with the Germany's aim to preserve control over the East European lands it occupied and with Bulgaria's claims on Dobruja and parts of Serbia. In December Enver informed the Quadruple Alliance that they would like to see a restoration to pre-Russo-Turkish War (1877–1878) borders, pointing out that only the Ottomans lost territory and that the territories at issue was inhabited primarily by Muslims. However the Ottomans did not push this position too hard, scared to fall back to bilateral agreements. On the other hand, Germany, Austria-Hungary, and Bulgaria clearly stood behind the pulling back of the Ottoman and Russian forces from Persia, which the Ottomans coveted control over. The ambassador to Berlin, Ibrahim Hakki Pasha, wrote: "Although Russia may be in a weakened state today, it is always an awesome enemy and it is probable that in a short time it will recover its former might and power.

On 22 December 1917, the first meeting between Ottomans and the Bolsheviks, the temporary head Zeki Pasha, until Talat Pasha's arrival, requested of Lev Kamenev to put an end to atrocities being committed on Russian-occupied territory by Armenian partisans. Kamenev agreed and added "an international commission should be established to oversee the return of refugees (by own consent) and deportees (by forced relocation) to Eastern Anatolia. The battle of ideals, rhetoric, and material for the fate of Eastern Anatolia opened with this dialog .

The Treaty of Brest-Litovsk represented an enormous success for the empire. Minister of Foreign Affairs Halil Bey announced the achievement of peace to the Chamber of Deputies. He cheered the deputies further with his prediction of the imminent signing of a third peace treaty (the first Ukraine, second Russia, and with Romania). Halil Bey thought the Entente to cease hostilities and bring a rapid end to the war. The creation of an independent Ukraine promised to cripple Russia, and the recovery of Kars, Ardahan and Batum gave the CUP a tangible prize. Nationalism emerged at the center of the diplomatic struggle between the Central Powers and the Bolsheviks. The Empire recognized that Russia's Muslims, their co-religionists, were disorganized and dispersed could not become an organized entity in the future battles of ideals, rhetoric, and material. Thus, the Ottomans mobilized the Caucasus Committee to make claims on behalf of the Muslims. The Caucasus Committee had declined Ottoman earnest requests to break from Russia and embrace independence. The Caucasian Christians was far ahead in this new world concept. Helping the Caucasian Muslims to be free, like their neighbors, would be the Ottomans' challenge.

=== 1918 ===
In the overall war effort, the CUP was convinced that the empire's contribution was essential. Ottoman armies had tied down large numbers of Allied troops on multiple fronts, keeping them away from theatres in Europe where they would have been used against German and Austrian forces. Moreover, they claimed that their success at Gallipoli had been an important factor in bringing about the collapse of Russia, resulting in the revolution of April 1917. They had turned the war in favor of Germany and its allies. Hopes were initially high for the Ottomans that their losses in the Middle East might be compensated for by successes in the Caucasus Campaign. Enver Pasha maintained an optimistic stance, hid information that made the Ottoman position appear weak, and let most of the Ottoman elite believe that the war was still winnable.

==== Caucasus (Armenia–Azerbaijan–Georgia) ====
Ottoman policy toward the Caucasus evolved according to the changing demands of the diplomatic and geopolitical environment. The principle of "self-determination" became the criterion, or at least in part, to give them a chance to stand on their feet. The Bolsheviks did not regard national separatism in this region as a lasting force. Their expectation was whole region come under a "voluntary and honest union" (Note: The reference "voluntary and honest union" realized with the Soviet Union, as the 11th Red Army had its virtually unopposed advance to the region on 29 November 1920.) and this union bearing no resemblance to Lenin's famous description of Russia as a "prison house of peoples." Lenin's arrival to Russia was formally welcomed by Nikolay Chkheidze, the Menshevik Chairman of the Petrograd Soviet.

The Turks did not see a chance of these new states to stand against new Russia. These new Muslim states needed support to emerge as viable independent states. In order to consolidate a buffer zone with Russia (both for the Empire and these new states), however, Ottomans needed to expel the Bolsheviks from Azerbaijan and the North Caucasus before the end of war. Based on 1917 negotiations, Enver concluded that Empire should not to expect much military assistance from the Muslims of the Caucasus as they were the one in need. Enver also knew the importance of Kars—Julfa railroad and the adjacent areas for this support. Goal was set forward beginning from 1918 to end of the war.

The Empire duly recognized the Transcaucasian Democratic Federative Republic in February 1918. This preference to remain part of Russia led Caucasian politics to the Trebizond Peace Conference to base their diplomacy on the incoherent assertion that they were an integral part of Russia but yet not bound. The representatives were Rauf Bey for the Empire, and Akaki Chkhenkeli from the Transcaucasian delegation.

On 11 May, a new peace conference opened at Batum. The Treaty of Batum was signed on 4 June 1918, in Batum between the Ottoman Empire and three Trans-Caucasus states: First Republic of Armenia, Azerbaijan Democratic Republic and Democratic Republic of Georgia.

The goal was to assist the Azerbaijan Democratic Republic at the Battle of Baku, then turn north to assist the embattled Mountainous Republic of the Northern Caucasus and then sweep southward to encircle the British in Mesopotamia and retake Baghdad. The British in Mesopotamia were already moving north, with forty vans (claimed to loaded with gold and silver for buying mercenary) accompanied with only a brigade, to establish a foothold. At the time Baku was under the control of the 26 Baku Commissars which were Bolshevik and Left Socialist Revolutionary (SR) members of the Baku Soviet Commune. The commune was established in the city of Baku. In this plan, they expected resistance from Bolshevik Russia and Britain, but also Germany, which opposed the extension of their influence into the Caucasus. Ottoman's goal to side with Muslims of Azerbaijan and MRNC managed to get Bolsheviks of Russia, Britain and Germany on the same side of a conflict box at this brief point in the history.

Diplomacy with new states

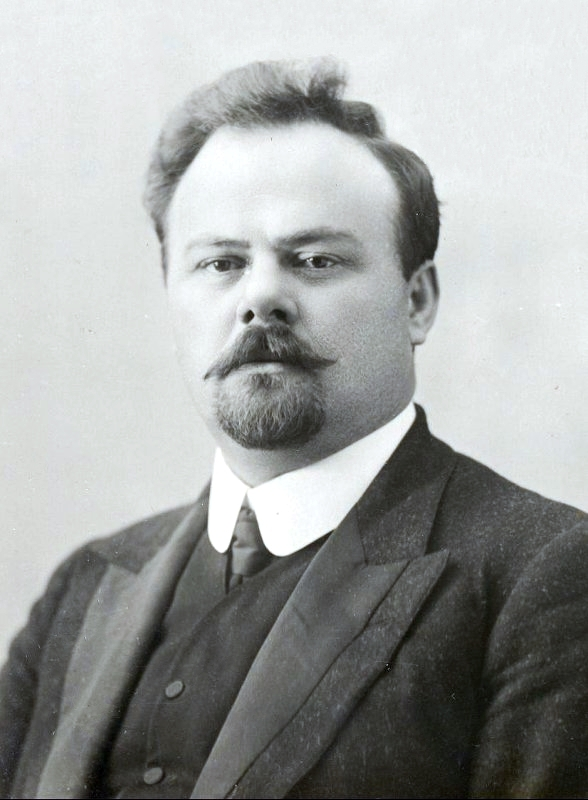
Akaki Chkhenkeli

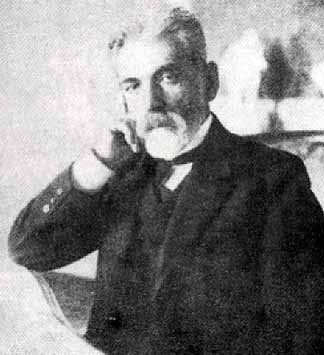
Hovhannes Katchaznouni (Note: Hovhannes Katchaznouni was in city of Van until 1914. He was on the Armenian delegation that conducted peace talks at Trabzon and Batoum negotiations with the Empire.)

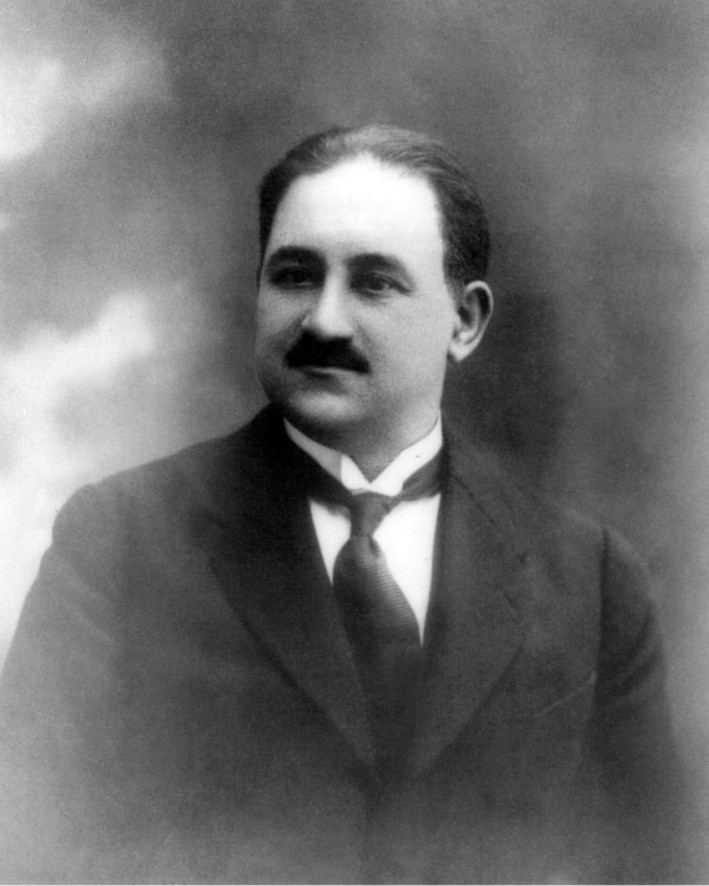
Mammad Amin Rasulzade

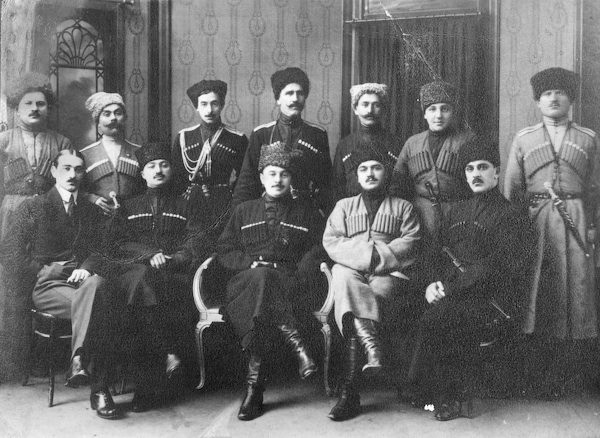
Leaders of the MRNC.

==== Armistice ====
Developments in Southeast Europe squashed the Ottoman government's hopes. In September 1918, the Allied forces under the command of Louis Franchet d'Espèrey mounted a sudden offensive at the Macedonian front, which proved quite successful. Bulgaria was forced to sue for peace in the Armistice of Salonica. This development undermined both the German and Ottoman cause simultaneously—the Germans had no troops to spare to defend Austria-Hungary from the newly formed vulnerability in Southeast Europe after the losses it had suffered in France, and the Ottomans suddenly faced having to defend Istanbul against an overland European siege without help from the Bulgarians.

Grand Vizier Talaat Pasha visited both Berlin, and Sofia, in September 1918, and came away with the understanding that the war was no longer winnable. With Germany likely seeking a separate peace, the Ottomans would be forced to as well. Talaat convinced the other members of the ruling CUP that they must resign, as the Allies would impose far harsher terms if they thought the people who started the war were still in power. Despite the Ottoman Empire and the United States not being at war, Talaat petitioned America to see if he could surrender to them on the terms of the Fourteen Points. The U.S. never responded, deferring to the British for advice. On 13 October, Talaat and the rest of his ministry resigned. Ahmed Izzet Pasha replaced Talaat as Grand Vizier.

Two days after taking office, Ahmed Izzet Pasha sent the captured British General Charles Vere Ferrers Townshend to the Allies to seek terms on an armistice. The British government, interpreted that not only should they conduct the negotiations, but should conduct them alone. There may have been a desire to cut the French out of territorial "spoils" promised to them in the Sykes-Picot agreement. Talaat had sent an emissary to the French as well, but that emissary had been slower to respond back. The British cabinet empowered Admiral Calthorpe to conduct the negotiations, and to explicitly exclude the French from them. The negotiations began on 27 October on HMS Agamemnon. The British refused to admit the senior French naval officer in the area, Vice-Admiral Jean Amet, to the negotiations. The Ottoman delegation was headed by Minister of Marine Affairs Rauf Bey.

Unknown to each other, both sides were actually quite eager to sign a deal and willing to give up their objectives to do so. The British delegation had been given a list of 24 demands, but were told to concede on any of them save allowing the occupation of the forts on the Dardanelles and free passage through the Bosphorus; the British desired access to the Black Sea for the Rumanian front. Prime Minister David Lloyd George desired to make a deal quickly before the United States could step in; according to the diary of Maurice Hankey:

[Lloyd George] was also very contemptuous of President Wilson and anxious to arrange the division of Empire between France, Italy, and G.B. before speaking to America. He also thought it would attract less attention to our enormous gains during the war if we swallowed our share of Empire now, and the German colonies later.

The Ottomans, for their part, believed the war to be lost and would have accepted almost any demands placed on them. As a result, the initial draft prepared by the British was accepted largely unchanged; the Ottomans did not know they could have pushed back on most of the clauses, and the British did not know they could have demanded even more. The Ottomans ceded the rights to the Allies to occupy "in case of disorder" any Ottoman territory, a vague and broad clause. The French were displeased with the precedent; Premier Clemenceau disliked the British making unilateral decisions in such an important matter. Lloyd George countered that the French had concluded a similar armistice on short notice in Salonica, and that Great Britain and Russia had committed the vast majority of the troops in the campaigns against the Ottomans. The French agreed to accept the matter as closed.

== Politics ==
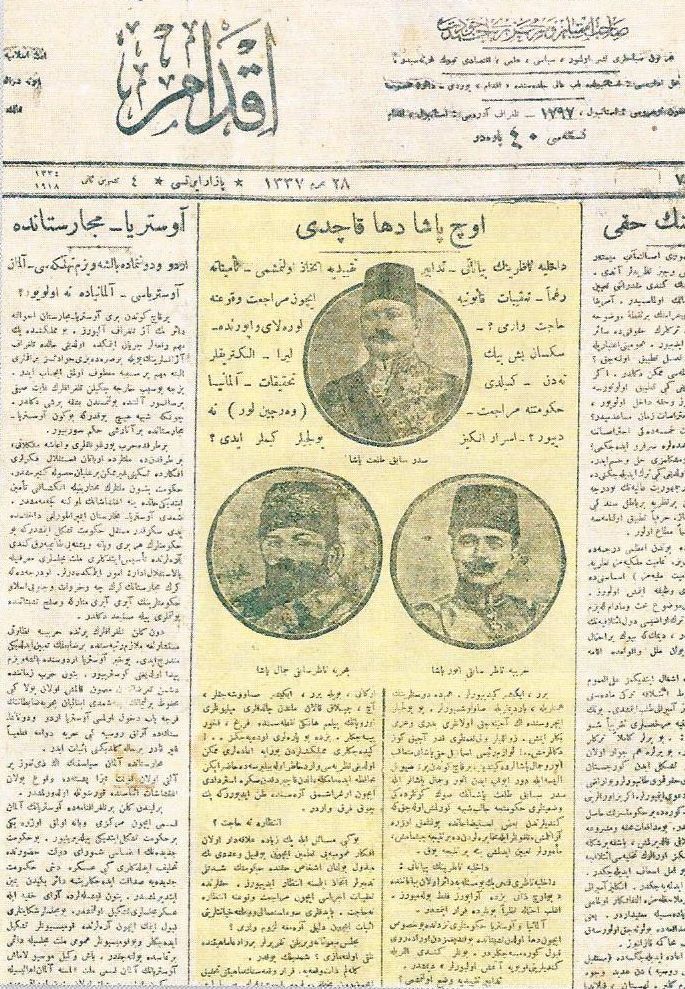
İkdam on 4 November 1918 announcing Enver, Talat, Djemal left the country.

On 30 October 1918, the Armistice of Mudros was signed, ending Ottoman involvement in World War I. The Ottoman public, however, was given misleadingly positive impressions of the severity of the terms of the Armistice. They thought its terms were considerably more lenient than they actually were, a source of discontent later that the Allies had betrayed the offered terms.

== Aftermath ==
=== Casualties ===
The Ottoman Empire sustained heavy casualties in the war. Of the 3 million men mobilized, over 771,000 died, including 325,000 killed in action and 466,700 killed by disease. Another 400,000 were wounded, 202,000 taken prisoner (mostly by Britain and Russia), 61,400 missing, and one million deserted, leaving only 323,000 men left under arms at the time of the armistice.

Without the Ottoman entry into the war, it is likely that the Allied victory would have been achieved more quickly. The British Empire engaged 2,550,000 men in the conflict on the various Ottoman fronts, or 32% of its total strength; the Russian Empire up to 720,000 men in September 1916, or 19% of its forces; France 50,000 men, mainly in the Dardanelles; and Italy 70,000 men in Libya against a pro-Ottoman rebellion. In total, both sides, Ottomans and Allies, lost 1,400,000 men.

=== Financial ===
The war effort effectively bankrupted the empire, costing 398.5 million Ottoman Lira, equal to 9.09 billion gold francs at the time.

== Genocide ==
During WWI, the Ottoman Empire engaged in a genocide against local ethnicities in its territory. The Armenian genocide, also known as the Armenian Holocaust, was the Ottoman government's systematic extermination of 1.5 million Christian Armenians, mostly Ottoman citizens within the Ottoman Empire and its successor state, the Republic of Turkey. The starting date is conventionally held to be 24 April 1915, the day that Ottoman authorities rounded up, arrested, and deported 235 to 270 Armenian intellectuals and community leaders from Constantinople to Ankara, the majority of whom were eventually murdered.

The genocide was carried out during and after World War I and implemented in two phases: the wholesale killing of the able-bodied male population through massacre and subjection of army conscripts to forced labour, followed by the deportation of women, children, the elderly, and the infirm on death marches leading to the Syrian desert. Driven forward by military escorts, the deportees were deprived of food and water and subjected to periodic robbery, rape, and massacre. Other indigenous and Christian ethnic groups such as the Assyrians and the Ottoman Greeks were similarly targeted for extermination by the Ottoman government in the Assyrian genocide and the Greek genocide, and their treatment is considered by some historians to be part of the same genocidal policy. Most Armenian diaspora communities around the world came into being as a direct result of the genocide.

Raphael Lemkin was explicitly moved by the Armenian annihilation to define systematic and premeditated exterminations within legal parameters and to coin the word genocide in 1943. The Armenian genocide is acknowledged to have been one of the first modern genocides, because scholars point to the organized manner in which the killings were carried out in order to eliminate the Armenians, and it is the second most-studied case of genocide after the Holocaust.

Turkey, the successor state of the Ottoman Empire, denies the word genocide as an accurate term for the mass killings of Armenians that began under Ottoman rule in 1915. It has in recent years been faced with repeated calls to recognize them as genocide. To date, 29 countries have officially recognized the mass killings as genocide, as have most genocide scholars and historians.

== Bibliography ==
- Akın, Yiğit (2018). When the War Came Home: The Ottomans' Great War and the Devastation of an Empire. Stanford University Press.
- Anderson, M.S. The Eastern question, 1774–1923: A study in international relations (1966) pp 310–52.
- Erickson, Edward J. (2001). Ordered to Die: A History of the Ottoman Army in the First World War. Westport, CT: Greenwood.
- Fromkin, David (2009). A Peace to End All Peace: The Fall of the Ottoman Empire and the Creation of the Modern Middle East. Macmillan. ISBN 978-0-8050-8809-0.
- Finkel, Caroline (2007). Osman's Dream: The History of the Ottoman Empire. Basic Books.
- Gaunt, David (2006). Massacres, Resistance, Protectors: Muslim-Christian Relations in Eastern Anatolia During World War I. Gorgias Press. pp. 62–64. ISBN 978-1-59333-301-0.
- Gingeras, Ryan (2022). The Last Days of the Ottoman Empire. Great Britain: Penguin Random House. ISBN 978-0-241-44432-0.
- Kent, Marian (1996). The Great Powers and the End of the Ottoman Empire. Routledge. ISBN 0714641545.
- McMeekin, Sean (2011). The Russian Origins of the First World War. Harvard University Press.
- Nicolle, David (2008). The Ottomans: Empire of Faith. Thalamus Publishing. ISBN 978-1902886114.
- Francesco Pongiluppi (2015). The Energetic Issue as a Key Factor of the Fall of the Ottoman Empire. in "The First World War: Analysis and Interpretation" (ed. by Biagini and Motta), Vol. 2., Newcastle, Cambridge Scholars Publishing, pp. 453–464.
- Reynolds, Michael A. (2011). Shattering Empires: The Clash and Collapse of the Ottoman and Russian Empires 1908–1918. Cambridge University Press. p. 324. ISBN 978-0521149167.
- Rogin, Eugene. The Fall of the Ottomans: The Great War in the Middle East (Basic Books, 2015) online review
- Shaw, Ezel Kural (1977). History of the Ottoman Empire and Modern Turkey. New York: Cambridge University Press. ISBN 0-521-21280-4.
- Slight, John (30 January 2019). "Reactions to the Ottoman jihad fatwa in the British Empire, 1914–18". The Great War in the Middle East. Routledge. ISBN 978-1-315-18904-8.
- Zürcher, Erik-Jan, ed. (2016). Jihad and Islam in World War I: Studies on the Ottoman Jihad on the Centenary of Snouck Gurgronje's "Holy War Made in Germany" (PDF). Leiden University Press. ISBN 978-90-8728-239-4.
- Vasquez, John A. (2018). Contagion and War: Lessons from the First World War. Cambridge University Press.
