= Hovhannes Kajaznuni =

Armenian politician; first Prime Minister of Armenia

- Հովհաննես Քաջազնունի
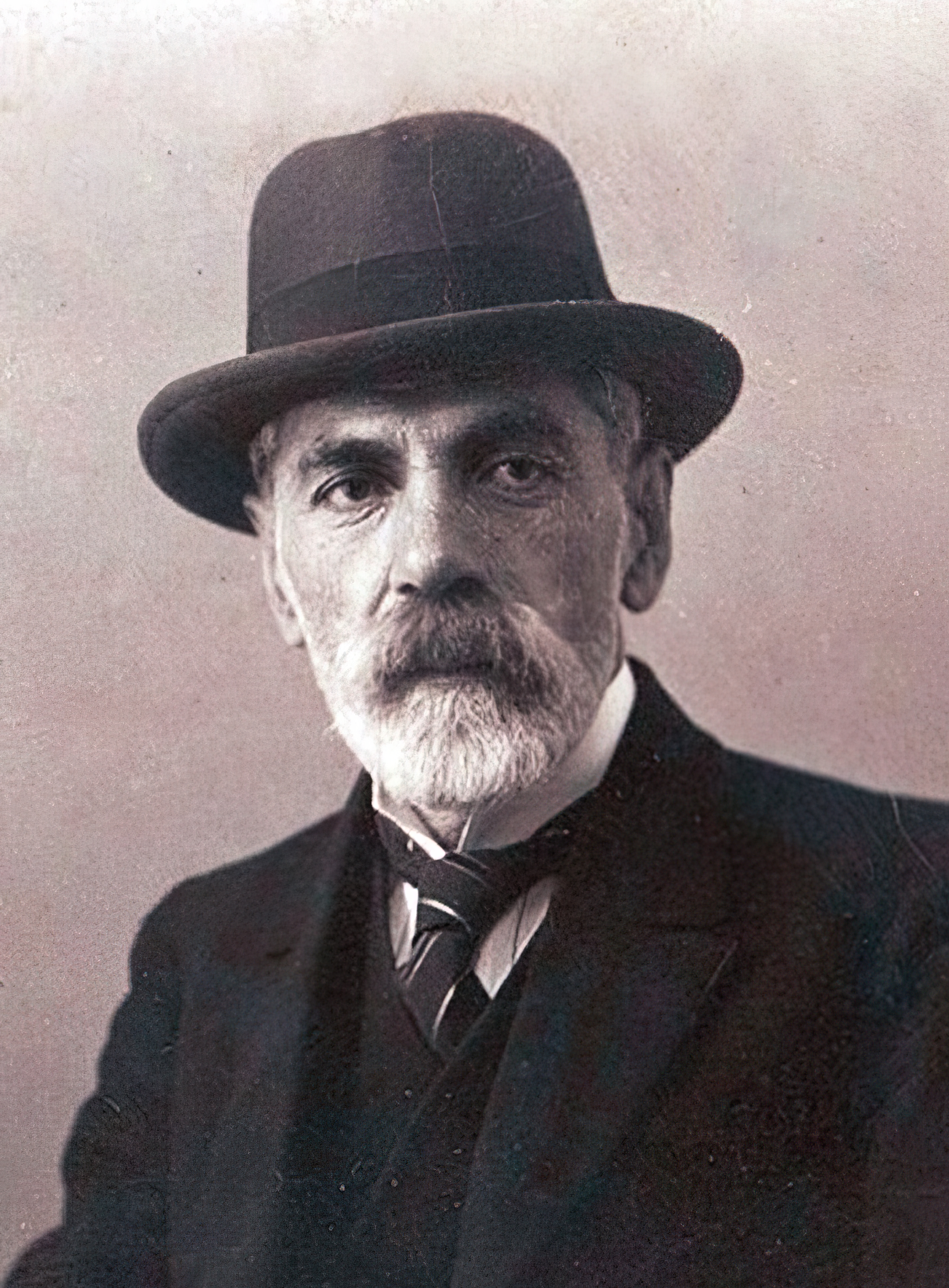
- Kajaznuni in 1920

1st Prime Minister of Armenia
- In office 6 June 1918 – 7 August 1919
- Preceded by: position established
- Succeeded by: Alexander Khatisian

Chairman of the Parliament of Armenia
- In office 4 November 1920 – 2 December 1920
- Preceded by: Avetik Sahakyan
- Succeeded by: position abolished

Personal details
- Born: 14 February 1868 Akhaltsikh (Akhaltsikhe), Akhaltsikhe uezd, Tiflis Governorate, Russian Empire
- Died: 15 January 1938 (aged 69) Yerevan, Armenian SSR, Soviet Union
- Party: Armenian Revolutionary Federation
- Spouse: Satenik Mirmanian (m. 1889)

Hovhannes Kajaznuni or Katchaznouni (Armenian: Հովհաննես Քաջազնունի; (Note: Traditional orthography: Յովհաննէս Քաջազնունի) 14 February 1868 – 15 January 1938) was an Armenian architect and politician who served as the first prime minister of the First Republic of Armenia from 6 June 1918 to 7 August 1919. He was a member of the Armenian Revolutionary Federation.

== Early life ==
Kajaznuni was born Hovhannes Ter-Hovhannisian in 1868 in the town of Akhaltsikh (present-day Akhaltsikhe), then part of the Akhaltsikhe uezd of the Tiflis Governorate of the Russian Empire, now part of Georgia. He attended secondary school in Tiflis from 1877 to 1886. In 1887, he moved to Saint Petersburg and entered the Citizens' Architectural Institute, graduating with honours in 1893. While in Saint Petersburg, Kajaznuni joined the Armenian Revolutionary Federation, eventually becoming one of its most important figures. After graduation, he worked at the construction department of the Baku provincial administration (1893–95), as an architect in Batum (1895–1897), and as regional architect at the Tiflis provincial administration (1897–99). Between 1899 and 1906, he worked as a senior architect in Baku, designing hospitals and apartment buildings, his most notable work being the Saint Thaddeus and Bartholomew Cathedral completed in 1911. After 1906 he devoted himself to political and social activities.

== Political career ==
Kajaznuni was forced to leave the Caucasus in 1911 to avoid being called to testify at the trial of Armenian Revolutionary Federation members mounted by the Russian government in Saint Petersburg in January 1912. He lived in Constantinople and then in Van until 1914, when he returned to the Caucasus. He became a member of the Armenian National Council in 1917 and was an ARF representative in the Seym (the Transcaucasian Parliament) until 1918.

=== Trebizond Peace Conference and Transcaucasian Federation ===
He was part of the Armenian delegation that conducted peace talks with the Ottoman Empire at the Trebizond Peace Conference, beginning on 14 March 1918. The three groups of Transcaucasian delegates—Muslim, Georgian and Armenian—had divergent aims, and were in a weak position to negotiate with the Ottomans. While the talks progressed, the Ottoman Third Army retook Erzurum after the Imperial Russian army abandoned it and advanced to the previous frontier with Russia. These setbacks spurred Akaki Chkhenkeli, the Georgian Menshevik leader of the Transcaucasian delegation, to unilaterally inform the Ottomans that he would accept the Treaty of Brest-Litovsk as the basis for negotiation, and thereby abandon Armenian claims to portions of Ottoman territory. This concession was repudiated by the Seym, which ordered Chkhenkeli and the delegation to return to Tiflis.

The capture of Batum by Ottoman troops on 14 April 1918 sapped the will of the Georgian Mensheviks to continue fighting the Ottomans, and they pushed their Transcaucasian allies to accept the two Ottoman prerequisites for resuming negotiations: a recognition of Turkey's territorial rights and a full break with Russia. This resulted in the Mensheviks and Muslims in the Seym proposing on 22 April 1918 to establish a Transcaucasian Democratic Federative Republic with reluctant endorsement from the increasingly isolated Armenian representatives. The new republic's cabinet was selected by Chkhenkeli as premier-designate, and included Kajaznuni as one of four Armenians. One of Chkhenkeli's first acts, without consulting the Seym or the Armenian cabinet members, was to order the Armenian army to surrender Kars to the Ottomans. The furious Armenian leaders tendered their resignations from the cabinet and demanded Chkhenkeli be replaced. The Mensheviks would only agree to replace him with Kajaznuni or another Armenian. The Armenians realized that nominating an Armenian premier would cause the Ottomans to attack Russian Armenia, which was on the front-line since the loss of Kars. Accordingly, Kajaznuni and his fellow Dashnaks allowed the Seym to confirm their cabinet positions on 26 April 1918.

=== Batum Peace Conference ===
Kajaznuni also accompanied Chkhenkeli as a delegate to the Batum Peace Conference that began on 11 May 1918. At the conference, the Ottomans extended their demands to include Akhaltsikh and Akhalkalaki in Tiflis Governorate and the western half of Erivan Governorate. Before the Transcaucasus delegation had delivered a response, Ottoman forces invaded the Erivan Governorate, and on May 15 captured Alexandropol. A week later, they had approached both Erivan and Karakilisa. Unable to negotiate anything more favorable than capitulation with the Ottomans, the Georgian leaders at the Batum talks arranged a side-deal with Germany to exchange German protection for access to Georgia's economic resources. The result was that the Seym dissolved the federative republic on 26 May 1918, with the Democratic Republic of Georgia declared the same day and the republics of Azerbaijan and Armenia declared on May 28.

=== Independent Armenia ===
The Armenian National Council elected Kajaznuni as the first prime minister of the independent Armenian state on 6 June 1918 and his cabinet was formed on June 30. Kajaznuni held this position until 7 August 1919; with the nomination as a prime minister abroad from 5 June 1919. He was in diplomatic missions in Europe (beginning in August 1919) and the United States (from 9 October 1919 until August 1920). During the battle for Zangibasar (modern-day Masis) on 19–21 June 1920, Kajaznuni's son Aram (a lieutenant in the Armenian army) was killed by Tatar rebels—this was the second son he had lost in battle since 1918. Kajaznuni later returned to Armenia to become chairman of the parliament on 4 November 1920. Kajaznuni was arrested after the Bolsheviks came to power in December 1920 but was freed during the February 1921 revolt against the Soviet regime.

=== Soviet Period ===
After the end of the revolt in early April 1921, he left the country and lived in Bucharest from 1921 to 1924. In August 1923, he left the Armenian Revolutionary Federation. In 1925 he returned to Soviet Armenia and worked as an architect in Leninakan. He also taught at the technical department of Yerevan State University, lecturing on construction and architecture. In 1930 he joined the newly established Construction Institute and attained the title of professor there. Kajaznuni became a member of the Armenian Union of Architects. Kajaznuni was a victim of Stalin's Great Terror—arrested in 1937 and imprisoned, he died in prison in 1938. The exact date of his death is unknown.

== Kajaznuni's 1923 Congress Report: "Dashnaktsutyun Has Nothing More to Do" ==
Kajaznuni prepared a critical report for the Armenian Revolutionary Federation party convention held in Bucharest during April 1923 (the 10th Congress of the Party was held in 1924–1925) (Note: Svajian describes this as "...the manifesto to the 'Dashnag Party Congress' in Bucharest, April 1923. His manifesto is entitled, 'Dashnaktzoutune Has Nothing To Do Any More.'") (Note: Bast's description is a "...book which was originally 'a manifesto' he had presented to the convention of the foreign branches of the Armenian Revolutionary Federation (Bucharest, 1923)") titled Dashnaktsutyun Has Nothing More to Do, which called for the party's support of Soviet Armenia. Before this event, every single Armenian political party in exile was opposed to Soviet Armenia's stance.

Kajaznuni first published his report in Bucharest in July 1923 under the title Dashnaktsutyun Has Nothing to Do. Then, adding one of his letters to ARF leader Simon Vratsian (who tried to dissuade Kazajnuni from publishing the report) as an appendix and the word anymore (aylevs) to the title, he published the report again in Vienna and Alexandria. In 1923, it was published in Tiflis in the Soviet Union with an introduction by Sargis Khanoyan; a Russian translation was published in Tiflis in 1927. Its claims immediately drew rebuke from the party. (Note: Reuben Darbinian's first name is also transliterated as "Rouben", "Ruben", "Rooben", etc.) (Note: Gakavian writes "In the early 1920s the ARF experienced a split between its left and right wings over what policy the party should take towards Soviet Armenia. At the same time, the former Prime Minister of Armenia, Hovhannes Kachaznouni, published a book, The ARF Has Nothing More to Do, and migrated to Soviet Armenia. As the title suggests, Kachaznouni argued that the ARF and the other parties had no role to play in Armenian political life, now that Armenia was Bolshevik. The opponents of the ARF, of course, capitalised on this. In the same year, a response was written to Kachaznouni by high-ranking party member Rouben Darbinian, who argued that Kachaznouni was wrong to give up hope, because Sovietisation would be short lived, and the ARF needed to continue the struggle for freedom.") (Note: Derogy quotes an 11 April 1923 letter from Shahan Natali to the Boston committee: "I was informed too late to be able to express my view towards the item put on the agenda of the next interim conference in Vienna; the position of the Party toward the sovietization of Armenia. You are not without responsibility for this delay, which has prevented me from making the party return to its revolutionary line.")

A condensed version of the report was translated into English in 1955 by Matthew Aram Callender, and edited by Arthur Derounian. In the introduction written by Derounian, an anti-Dashnak journalist, Kajaznuni is described as a "patriot" whose report was a "deep and incisive self-study" that is a "refutation" of the "grandiose, exaggerated and even outrageously false claims of the Dashnag leadership today". In 1990, the 1927 Russian translation with the introduction by S. Khanoyan was republished in Baku. The Armenian original was reprinted in Yerevan in 1994 and 1995 and most recently in 2016.

In 2006 Turkish historian Mehmet Perinçek, who denies the Armenian genocide, published translations of Kajaznuni's 1923 report into Turkish, English, French and German on the basis of the 1927 Russian version published in Tiflis. Perinçek presents Kajaznuni's report as evidence against the fact of the Armenian genocide. These translations were published in a book series titled Ermeni Belgeleriyle Ermeni Soykırımı Yalanı (in English: The Lie of the 'Armenian Genocide' in Armenian Documents). Perinçek said that the Russian State Library copy was unabridged and that translations for these copies were unavailable before. Callender's translation did abridge the main body of the book but translated Kajaznuni's introduction verbatim—this is the key section which contains the description of the Armenian genocide. (Note: Katchaznouni's description of the holocaust is given on pages 6 and 7 of Matthew A. Callender's translation.) A note on page 4 explains that Callender has translated most of Kajaznuni's remarks directly: "Except for abridgements, made for the sake of brevity by the translator and the editor, Katchaznouni's utterances appear verbatim." On page 8, after the description of the genocide, Callender indicates that he is switching from verbatim to selective translation: "Translator's Note: Up to this point the words of the author have been translated verbatim in order to give an idea of Mr. Katchaznouni's logical mind and the exposition of the facts that drove him to present his 'Manifesto' to his colleagues at the 1923 Convention. From here on, and solely for the sake of brevity, we shall quote excerpts of his arguments which led to his decision as to why the Dashnagtzoutiun, in his opinion, should 'decisively end its existence' because 'there is no work for the Party'.

Viken L. Attarian claims Perinçek's "discovery" is actually a forgery made by partisan Turkish historians to deny the fact of the Armenian genocide. Attarian said: "The Turkish denialists are the ones who talk most about Katchaznouni and ... use texts and falsified translations that have nothing in common with the originals... Whatever the Turk denialists present about K[atchaznouni] is wrong and a lie... Katchaznouni never denied the Genocide and ... never betrayed his homeland". In his report, Kajaznuni refers directly to the massacres of Armenians by the Ottoman authorities and the "deportation or extermination of the Ottoman Armenians [t’urk’ahay zhoghovrdi taragrut’ean kam bnajnjman]".

Other historians who deny the Armenian genocide, such as Justin McCarthy and Michael Gunter, have also referred to Kajaznuni's report. McCarthy presents Kajaznuni's reference of the organization of Armenian volunteer regiments by the ARF in the Russian Empire during World War I as evidence of an ARF plot to organize a revolt among Ottoman Armenians and have Ottoman Armenian soldiers desert to the Russian side. In fact, the volunteer regiments were formed in Russia, not the Ottoman Empire, and were composed mainly of Russian Armenians.

== Works ==
- Kachaznuni, Ovanes (1911). Sto desiat' dnei v Evrope: Iz zapisnoi knizhki turista [A hundred and ten days in Europe: From the notebook of a tourist]. Baku: Gaz. "Baku". (New edition in Russian, Saint Petersburg, 2013.)
- Kachaznuni, Hovhannes (1923). H. H. Dashnaktsutiwne anelik chuni (in Armenian). Bucharest.
  - Kachaznuni, Hovhannes (1923). H. H. Dashnaktsutiwne anelik chuni aylews. Vienna: Mkhitarean Tparan.
  - Katchaznouni, Hovhannes (August 1955). Carlson, John Roy (ed.). The Armenian Revolutionary Federation (Dashnagtzoutiun) Has Nothing to Do Anymore. Translated by Callender, Matthew A. New York: Armenian Information Service.
- Kachaznouni, H. (1965). Hed mahou: Badmvadzkner, housher, hotvadzner, namagner [Postmortem: Stories, memories, articles, letters] (in Armenian). Beirut: Hradaragoutiun Hamazkayin Ungeroutyan. (Collection compiled and published after Kajaznuni's death)
- Kachaznouni, Hovhannes (1979). Azg ew hayrenik [Nation and homeland] (in Armenian). Beirut: Hamazkayin Vahe Setian Publishing House. (New edition in Yerevan, 2008.)

== Sources ==
- Attarian, Viken L. "Hovhannes Katchaznouni - the Intellectual Politician and Unique Patriot (A Lecture in Armenian)". Montreal. Archived from the original on 4 March 2016.
- Bast, Oliver (2002). La Perse et la Grande Guerre [Persia and the Great War] (in French). Institut français de recherche en Iran. ISBN 978-2-909961-23-1.
- Darbinian, Reuben (1923). Mer Badaskhane H. Kachaznunii Մեր Պատասխանը Յ․ Քաջազնունիի [Our Response to H. Kachaznuni] (PDF) (in Armenian). Boston: Hayrenik Tparan.
- Derogy, Jacques (1990). Resistance and Revenge. Transaction. ISBN 0-88738-338-6.
- Gasparyan, Ye. (1996). "Kajaznuni (Igitkhanyan) Hovhannes Rubeni". In Khudaverdyan, Kostandin; et al. (eds.). Haykakan hartsʻ hanragitaran Հայկական հարց հանրագիտարան [Encyclopedia of the Armenian Question] (in Armenian). Yerevan: Haykakan Hanragitarani Glkhavor Khmbagrutʻyun. p. 456.
- Gakavian, Armen (October 1997). "Armenian Diasporan Identity Reimagined, 1915–1985". Homeland, Diaspora and Nationalism: The Reimagination of American-Armenian Identity Since Gorbachev (PhD thesis). Department of Government and Public Administration, University of Sydney. Archived from the original on 22 August 2011.
- Hovannisian, Richard G. (1971). The Republic of Armenia, Vol. I: The First Year, 1918–1919. Berkeley: University of California Press. ISBN 9780520018051.
- Hovannisian, Richard G. (1996). The Republic of Armenia, Vol. III: From London to Sèvres, February–August 1920. Berkeley: University of California Press. p. 295. ISBN 978-0520088030. OCLC 238471.
- Hovannisian, Richard G. (January 1974). "Dimensions of Democracy and Authority in Caucasian Armenia, 1917–1920". Russian Review. 33 (1). Blackwell Publishing: 37–49. doi:10.2307/127620. JSTOR 127620.
- Kaligian, Dikran (2014). "Anatomy of Denial: Manipulating Sources and Manufacturing a Rebellion". Genocide Studies International. 8 (2): 208–223. doi:10.3138/gsi.8.2.06. JSTOR 26986004.
- Katchaznouni, Hovhannes (2007). Dashnagtzoutiun Has Nothing to Do Anymore. Translated by Akalın, Lale. Introduction by Mehmet Perinçek (3rd ed.). Kaynak Yayınları. ISBN 978-975-343-453-9.
- Katchaznouni, Hovhannes (July 1923). Dashnaktsʻutʻiwně anelikʻ chʻuni aylews Դաշնակցութիւնը անելիք չունի այլեւս (PDF) (in Armenian). Vienna: Mechitarist Press.
- Katchaznouni, Hovhannes (1955). The Armenian Revolutionary Federation Has Nothing To Do Any More: The Manifesto of Hovhannes Katchaznouni. Translated by Callender, Matthew A. New York: Armenian Information Service.
- Libaridian, Gerard J (September 1991). Armenia at the Crossroads: Democracy and Nationhood in the Post-Soviet Era. Blue Crane Books. ISBN 0-9628715-1-6.
- Martirosyan, Hayk (2019). "Ditarkumner Hovhannes Kʻajaznunu 'H. Y. Dashnaktsʻutʻiwně anelikʻ chʻuni aylews' grkʻuyki shurj" Դիտարկումներ Հովհաննես Քաջազնունու «Հ. Յ. Դաշնակցութիւնը անելիք չունի այլեւս» գրքույկի շուրջ [Observations on the booklet entitled "Armenian Revolutionary Federation has nothing to do anymore" by Hovhannes Kajaznuni]. Etchmiadzin (in Armenian). 76 (9): 80–97 – via Pan-Armenian Digital Library.
- Nassibian, Akaby (1984). Britain and the Armenian Question, 1915–1923. New York: St. Martin's Press. ISBN 978-0-312-09809-4. Archived from the original on 2008-09-28. (also London and Sydney: Croom Helm)
- Özdemir, Sadi (2 November 2007). "Ermeni isyanını Perinçek buldu İTO ABD'ye gönderiyor". Hürriyet (in Turkish). Archived from the original on 3 November 2007.
- Svajian, Stephen G (1977). A Trip Through Historic Armenia. New York: GreenHill.
- Tigranian, Edmond (2003). Hay chartarapetneri gortsuneutʻyuně Andrkovkasum XIX dari verj - XX dari skizb Հայ ճարտարապետների գործունեությունը Անդրկովկասում XIX դարի վերջ - XX դարի սկիզբ [Contributions of Armenian architects in Transcaucasia at the end of the 19th century and the beginning of the 20th century] (in Armenian). Yerevan: Voskan Yerevantsi. ISBN 9993000523.

Political offices
Preceded by None	Prime Minister of the First Republic of Armenia; 1918-1919	Succeeded by Alexander Khatisyan
