= Şəfibəyli =

Şəfibəyli or Shafibeili or Shafibeyli may refer to:

- Şəfibəyli, Goranboy, Azerbaijan
- Şəfibəyli, Zangilan, Azerbaijan
- Shafibeyli clan, an Azerbaijani genealogy
