= Chkhenkeli =

Chkhenkeli (Georgian: ჩხენკელი) is a Georgian surname that may refer to the following notable people:

- Akaki Chkhenkeli (1874–1959), Georgian Social Democratic politician and publicist
- Kita Chkhenkeli (1895–1963), Georgian linguist, brother of Akaki
