= Shafibeyli clan =

Clan

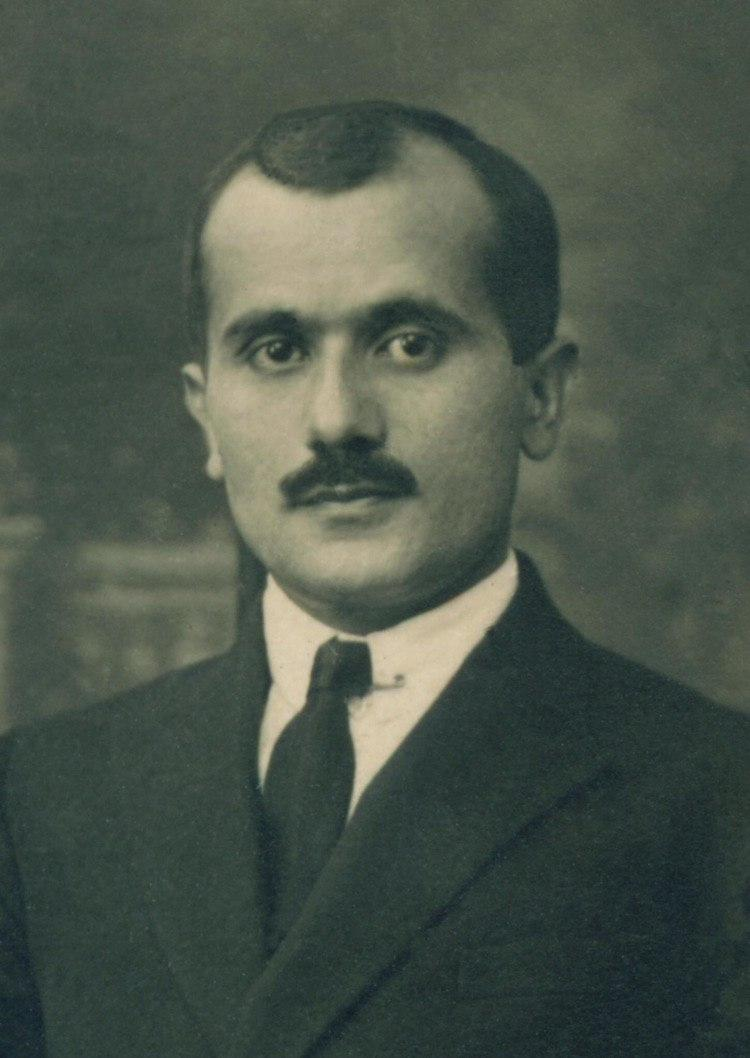
Shafi bey Rustambeyov.

The Shafibeyli clan is one of the well-known genealogies of the Azerbaijani people. The great-grandfather of the clan is Shafi-Bey. He was born in the Aydingyshlag village in the Gabala Sultanate. According to some information, he was a district deputy, and was in charge of managing his property.

== Representatives of the generation ==
It was Shafi-Bey who founded the Shafi-Beyli clan. He was born in the Aydingyshlag village of the Gabala Sultanate and studied at mullah. According to some reports, he was a district deputy. They had two sons named Jafar-Bey and Bakhish-Bey.

Jafar-Bey Shafi-Bey was born in 1815 in the village of Aydingyshlag. After studying at mullah, he served in the Russian army. He had the rank of lieutenant and three sons named Haji-Bey, Shukur-Bey and Rustam-Bey.

Haji-Bey was born in 1834, Shukur-Bey - in 1836, and Rustam-Bey in 1838 in the village of Aydingyshlag. All three studied with the mullah and lived managing their estates.

The descendants of Rustam-Bey carried the surname Rustambeyli. He had two sons named Agha-Bey and Mustafa-Bey.

Rustam-Bey's son Mustafa-Bey was born in 1864 in the village of Aydingyshlag. During the time of the Republic of Azerbaijan, to improve the supply of the army, Azerbaijan donated to the army 20 000 pairs of shoes. In 1920, after the April invasion, he was shot along with his son Haji-Bey. In Mahammad Amin Rasulzade's book "The Republic of Azerbaijan", his name is mentioned in the list of people killed by Bolsheviks after the occupation. At the moment, the house of Mustafa-Bey, in the village of Kichick Piralli of Gabala district, has been preserved. He had four sons named Jafar-Bey, Shafi-Bey, Haji-Bey and Bakhish-Bey.

Jafar-Bey Rustambeyli was born in 1890 in the village of Mammadli, Aresh district. In 1909, he entered the medical faculty of Kyiv University, and after graduation he was mobilized as a military doctor. Firstly, he worked as a doctor in the 58th Infantry Regiment, and since 1917 in Crimea. According to the order signed by F. Khoyski, on 3 April 1919, from 19 March, Jafar-Bey Rustambeyli was appointed the diplomatic representative of Azerbaijan in Kuban and Crimea, as well as trade representative. He was shot after the Soviet occupation.

Shafi-Bey Rustambeyli was born in 1893 in the village of Aydingyshlag. Having received a secondary education in the classical gymnasium in Ganja, in 1911 he entered the law faculty of Kyiv University. He was one of the leaders and active members of the Organization of Compatriots of Azerbaijan established at the university. In 1916, he returned to Ganja and, after receiving the diploma of higher lawyer, he worked in the district court. He was elected a deputy of the Transcaucasian Seim, formed in 1918, and was one of the 8 people who signed the Declaration of Independence of Azerbaijan. During the period of the Republic of Azerbaijan, he worked as a deputy, deputy minister of internal affairs (since March 1920), editor of the "Azerbaijan" newspaper (in Russian), and head of the Committee for Assistance to Refugees. After the occupation of Azerbaijan by the Bolsheviks in 1920, he left to Georgia, and after the occupation of Georgia in 1921 - to Trabzon, and in August of the same year - to Istanbul. Here he continued his political activity until the end of his life. Shafi-Bey died in 1953. His grave is in the Ferikoy Cemetery in Istanbul.
