= Transcaucasian Seim =

Legislature of Transcaucasia (1918)

Transcaucasian Seim Անդրկովկասի սեյմ Zaqafqaziya Seymi ამიერკავკასიის სეიმი Закавказский сейм

Type
- Type: Unicameral

History
- Founded: 23 February 1918
- Disbanded: 26 May 1918
- Succeeded by: National Assembly of Armenia; Azerbaijani National Council; National Council of Georgia

Leadership
- Chairman: Nikolay Chkheidze, Social Democratic Party of Georgia; 1918

Structure
- Seats: 125
- Political groups: Social Democratic Party of Georgia (32); Musavat (30); Armenian Revolutionary Federation (27); Muslim Socialist Bloc (7); Ittihad (3); Muslim Social Democratic Party (4); Other parties (22)

Meeting place
- Tbilisi

The Transcaucasian Seim was a representative and legislative body of state power in the Transcaucasus, convened by the Transcaucasian Commissariat in Tiflis on 23 February 1918. Its members consisted of Russian Constituent Assembly deputies elected in Transcaucasia, as well as representatives of the various political parties of Transcaucasia. Its chairman was Nikolay Chkheidze of the Social Democratic Party of Georgia.

On 26 March 1918, the Seim accepted the resignation of the Transcaucasian Commissariat and formed the Provisional Transcaucasian Government, on 22 April proclaimed the creation of the Transcaucasian Democratic Federative Republic, which at the end of May split into independent republics – Armenia, Azerbaijan and Georgia.

== History ==
After the overthrow of the Provisional Government as a result of the October Armed Uprising of 1917, on 24 November 1917, an "Independent Government of Transcaucasia" – the Transcaucasian Commissariat was created in Tiflis. The declaration of the Transcaucasian Commissariat indicated that it would act "only until the convocation of the Russian Constituent Assembly, and if it is impossible to convene it ... until the congress of members of the Constituent Assembly from Transcaucasia and the Caucasian Front".

On 18 January 1918, the Constituent Assembly began its work in Petrograd, the majority of which were representatives of the Mensheviks and Socialist Revolutionaries. Most of the deputies refused to recognize Soviet power and the decrees of the Second All–Russian Congress of Soviets. In response, the Bolsheviks dispersed the Constituent Assembly. The Transcaucasian Commissariat, which supported the Constituent Assembly, took an openly hostile position towards the Bolsheviks and also did not recognize Soviet power. After a series of consultations with the national councils, the Transcaucasian Commissariat decided to convene the Transcaucasian Seim as the legislative body of the Transcaucasia. The Transcaucasian Seim included deputies elected to the Constituent Assembly from Transcaucasia. The convocation of the Seim was the first step towards the separation of Transcaucasia from Soviet Russia.

== Composition ==
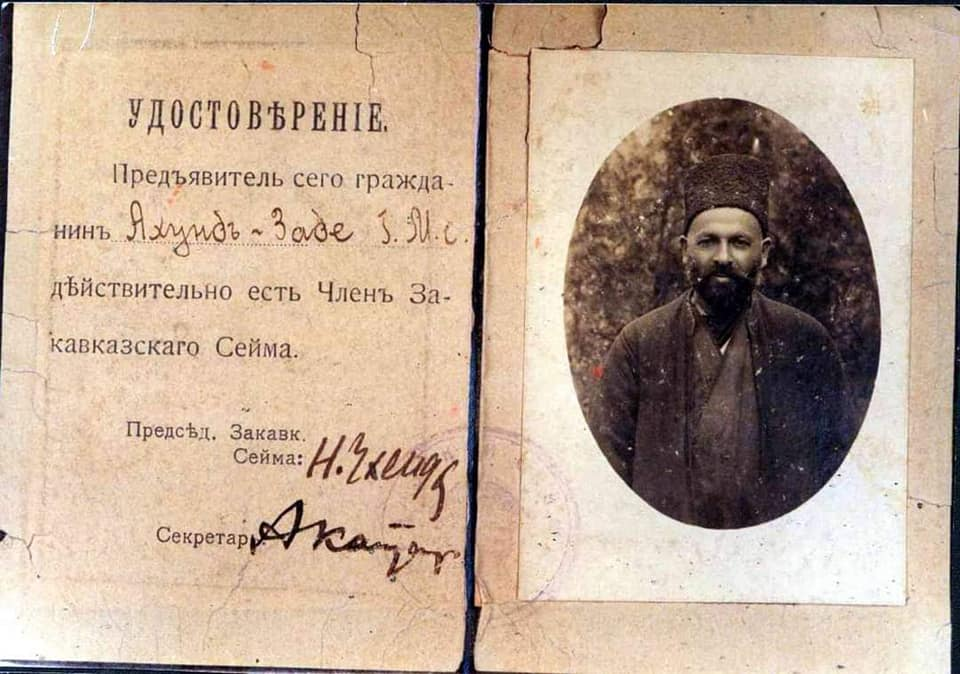
Certificate of the member of the Transcaucasian Seim Haji Selim Akhundzade from Musavat

The Seim consisted of 125 delegates: the Georgian Mensheviks numbered 32 deputies, representatives of Musavat with a non–partisan Muslim group that joined it – 30 deputies, the Armenian Dashnaktsutyun Party – 27 people, the Muslim Socialist Bloc – 7 seats, Ittihad ("Islam in Russia") – 3, Muslim Social Democratic Party – 4, and there were also Socialist Revolutionaries, national democrats and representatives of the Armenian Party of People's Freedom. Nikolay Chkheidze, a representative of the Menshevik faction, became the Chairman of the convened Seimas, and the former Head of the Transcaucasian Commissariat, Yevgeny Gegechkori, was elected head of the government.

On 23 February 1918, the first meeting of the Seim was held in Tiflis, but almost all representatives of Musavat were absent, as they were carrying out preparatory work to annex the Elizavetpol Governorate to Turkey. Journalist Solomon Kheifetz noted:

The Musavat Party consisted of large Muslim landowners, khans, beks, mullahs, prominent doctors and nationalist lawyers. This party wanted to use the situation in order to annex the Elizavetpol Province to Turkey. The moment was right. The situation in Turkey, where Enver Pasha reigned, seemed to be stable thanks to the alliance with the Germans, and the political system of Turkey guaranteed the khans and beks the safety of their estates. By the time of the opening of the Seim, the Musavat deputies were busy on the ground with work on preparing Azerbaijan's accession to Turkey and could not come to Tiflis.

A project to change the boundaries of provinces and districts in the Transcaucasian region proposed to the Minister of Internal Affairs of the Provisional Government by a meeting held on 14–15 October 1917 under the Special Transcaucasian Committee (OZAKOM) on the implementation of zemstvo reform and the redistribution of administrative boundaries of provinces and districts of Transcaucasia, as well as by the decree of the Transcaucasian Commissariat of 16 December 1917 "On the introduction of zemstvo in Transcaucasia".

In the government, however, there was no agreement between the parties. Disputes between the factions arose on a variety of issues, which, in turn, could not but affect the efficiency of the Seim.

== Domestic policy ==
By the time the Transcaucasian Seim was formed, the most acute in the region were two issues that required immediate government intervention – national and agrarian. However, the decisions taken by the Seim did not give any positive results. So, the "Law on the Determination of the Rate of Land Left to the Owners, and on Measures for the Implementation of Land Reform", adopted in the spring of 1918, did not work. The lack of mechanisms for regulating land relations led to an increase in agrarian unrest.

The peasants' dissatisfaction with the unresolved land issue later led to armed uprisings in various districts of the Kutais and Tiflis Governorates. In April 1918, Soviet power was established in Sukhum, and then throughout the Sukhum Okrug, with the exception of the Kodori Gorge, where the uprising was suppressed by the troops of the Transcaucasian Commissariat and the Georgian National Guard. In March, peasant unrest broke out and was also suppressed in the Sachkhere and Chiatury Districts.

In matters of national policy, the Seim also failed. The government was unable to stop the increasing interethnic clashes. The visiting commissions, created from representatives of various factions, had practically no effect on the situation in the region. According to the Russian researcher Vadim Mukhanov, this was strongly influenced by the fact that the representatives of the large parties of Transcaucasia themselves, directly or indirectly, fueled the situation. According to Mukhanov, the Musavatists were interested in this in order to attract Turkish troops to the region under the guise of protecting the Muslim population, and the Dashnak leaders did not interfere with the reprisals of Armenian units against local Muslims, justifying themselves by the fact that the latter were blocking the movement of military echelons and the Armenian units had to fight their way through.

From the beginning of January 1918, clashes between Armenians and Azerbaijanis began to occur throughout the region, the first arsons of Azerbaijani and Armenian villages were recorded. Turkey, whose agents actively campaigned among the Muslim population, played a negative role in whipping up tensions in the Transcaucasia. (Note: Back in early October 1917, the head of the British mission, Lieutenant General Charles Barter, in a secret report informed the Commander–in–Chief of the Russian Army Nikolay Dukhonin that, due to the disorganization of the Russian troops in the Caucasus, intensified panturan and pro–Muslim agitation began among Muslims. In this regard, Charles Barter, passing on the words of General William Robertson, suggested that the Armenians be transferred from the Western Front to the places left by the retreating troops as soon as possible.) One of the leaders of the Georgian Mensheviks, Akaki Chkhenkeli, noted that "the armed Muslim population, adhering to a Turkish orientation, calls itself Turkish soldiers and terrorizes the entire Christian population with its anarchic manifestations".

The meeting of the national councils of Armenians and Muslims held in Tiflis did not produce meaningful results; tension continued to grow. The government was helpless in the face of the growing violence and anarchy, as well as in the face of external threat in the face of the impending invasion of the Turks.

== Issue of relations with Turkey ==
The offensive of the Turkish troops in 1918

By the beginning of 1918, the Russian troops had actually left the Caucasian Front, and their positions were occupied by the Armenian Corps, the formation of which had not yet been completed. On 12 February, two weeks before the convocation of the Transcaucasian Seim, Turkish troops, taking advantage of the collapse of the front and violating the conditions of the December 1917 Armistice, launched a large–scale offensive in the Erzurum, Van and Primorsky (Black Sea littoral) directions. Almost immediately, on 13 February, the Turks occupied Erzincan, and on 24 February – Trebizond. Under the onslaught of superior enemy forces, the scattered Armenian units retreated, covering the crowds of Western Armenian refugees leaving with them.

At the very first meeting of the Transcaucasian Seim, a heated discussion unfolded on the independence of the Transcaucasia and relations with Turkey in view of the unfolding Turkish offensive. The Dashnak faction proposed leaving Transcaucasia as part of Russia on the rights of autonomy, divided into national cantons, and in relations with Turkey – to insist on self–determination of Western Armenia. The Azerbaijani delegation, for its part, stated that Transcaucasia should decide its fate independently of Russia, concluding peace with Turkey on the basis of refusal to interfere in its internal affairs. The Georgian side basically supported the Azerbaijanis in the issue of proclaiming the independence of Transcaucasia and concluding an independent treaty with Turkey, since the Transcaucasia simply did not have the strength for a military confrontation with Turkey.

Due to the stubborn position of the Armenian faction, the issue of proclaiming independence was temporarily postponed. As for the position of Transcaucasia in future negotiations with Turkey on a separate peace, after a long discussion, the Seim adopted the following resolution:

1. Under these conditions, the Seim considers itself authorized to conclude an agreement with Turkey.
2. Starting negotiations with Turkey, the Seim pursues the goal of concluding a final truce.
3. The peace treaty should be based on the principle of restoring the Russian–Turkish borders of 1914, which existed at the time of the outbreak of the war.
4. The delegation should try to acquire for the peoples of Eastern Anatolia the right to self–determination, in particular – to autonomy for the Armenians within Turkey.

While the positions were being coordinated in the Seim, on 6 March the Turks captured Ardagan. On 12 March, the 25,000–strong Turkish army of Wehib Pasha entered Erzurum. The Armenian units defending the city fled, leaving behind large supplies of food and weapons. With the fall of Erzurum, the Turks actually regained control over all of Western Armenia.

In connection with the deteriorating state of affairs at the front, the Transcaucasian Seim proposed to Turkey to hold peace talks in Trebizond.

== Trebizond negotiations ==
The delegation of the Transcaucasian Seim in Trebizond was headed by Akaki Chkhenkeli. The peace conference began on 14 March.

A few days earlier, Turkey signed the Treaty of Brest-Litovsk with Soviet Russia. According to Article IV of the Brest Peace Treaty and the Russian–Turkish Supplementary Treaty, Turkey was transferred not only the territories of Western Armenia, but also the regions of Batum, Kars and Ardagan, which had been annexed by Russia as a result of the Russian–Turkish War of 1877–1878. The Russian Socialist Federative Soviet Republic pledged not to interfere "in the new organization of state–legal and international legal relations of these districts", to restore the border "in the form it existed before the Russian–Turkish War of 1877–78" and to dissolve on its territory and in the "occupied Turkish provinces" (that is, in Western Armenia) all the Armenian volunteer squads. The signing of the Treaty of Brest-Litovsk actually canceled the decree of the Council of People's Commissars of the Russian Socialist Federative Soviet Republic "On Turkish Armenia", which spoke of the right of Western Armenia to complete self–determination.

Turkey, which had just signed a peace treaty with Russia on the most favorable terms and had actually returned to the borders of 1914, demanded that the Transcaucasian delegation recognize the terms of the Brest Peace. The Transcaucasian delegation, claiming independence and rejecting the Treaty of Brest-Litovsk, hoped to conclude a separate peace with Turkey on more favorable terms – the restoration of the state borders of 1914 and self–determination for Eastern Anatolia within the framework of Turkish statehood. Based on military superiority, the Turkish side refused to even discuss these demands. Already at this stage, serious disagreements were revealed between the national parties of Transcaucasia on the question of what territories Transcaucasia could cede to Turkey. When the head of the Transcaucasian delegation, Akaki Chkhenkeli, on 5 April, taking into account the ongoing offensive of the Turkish troops, expressed his readiness to compromise both on the territorial issue and on the fate of the Turkish Armenians, the Turkish delegation presented two ultimatums one after the other demanding to recognize the Treaty of Brest-Litovsk and proclaim the independence of Transcaucasia. The consent of the Transcaucasian delegation to the initial demands of Turkey did not satisfy the Turkish government, which, inspired by military victories, now intended to cross the Russian–Turkish border of 1877–78 and move military operations deep into the Caucasus. On 10 April, the Chairman of the Transcaucasian Government Gegechkori sent a telegram to Trebizond to recall the delegation "in view of the fact that a peace agreement on the border of Transcaucasia between Turkey and Transcaucasia has not been reached". The Seim thus officially entered the war with Turkey. At the same time, representatives of the Azerbaijani faction in the Seim openly stated that they would not participate in the creation of a common union of the Transcaucasian peoples against Turkey, given their "special religious ties with Turkey".

== Turkish offensive and declaration of independence of Transcaucasia ==
On 5 April, the Turks occupied Sarıkamış in the Kars and Ardagan directions in the Batum Direction. At that time, about 14 thousand soldiers and 100 guns were in the Mikhailovskaya Fortress of the city of Batum. Despite such significant forces, on 14 April, the Batum City Duma dissolved the Revolutionary Defense Committee created by the Bolsheviks, after which it elected a delegation "from representatives of all nationalities to receive Turkish units entering the city". An important port on the Black Sea was surrendered without a fight. It became known that the Muslims of Adjaria and Akhaltsikh joined the advancing Turkish troops. The Georgian units were forced to retreat under the onslaught of the regular Turkish army, even when the Turks occupied Georgian territories – Guria and Ozurgeti – and reached the approaches to Kars.

On 22 April, at a meeting of the Transcaucasian Seim, after a stormy debate, despite the opposition of the Armenian delegation, it was decided to satisfy the demands of Turkey and proclaim the Transcaucasia "an independent, democratic and federal republic". At the same meeting, the resignation of the government of Yevgeny Gegechkori was accepted. The new government of Transcaucasia was instructed to form Akaki Chkhenkeli.

On 28 April, Turkey recognized the independent Transcaucasian Federation and suspended hostilities.

The Soviet government, on the contrary, protested against the de facto separation of Transcaucasia from Soviet Russia. An uprising broke out in Abkhazia in support of Soviet power. The rebels seized power in Sukhum, declaring their complete solidarity with Soviet Russia. Soviet power lasted 42 days in Abkhazia. The Baku Commune managed to establish Soviet power in a number of districts of the Baku Province: on 18 April – in Shemakha, on 21 April – in Salyany, on 23 April – in Cuba, on 1 May – in Lenkoran.

== Surrender of Kars ==
The new government sent an order to conclude an armistice to the Armenian troops occupying positions in the Kars Region. The Commander of the Armenian Corps, General Foma Nazarbekov, ordered the Commander of the 2nd Division, Colonel Movses Silikov, and the Chief of the Kars Fortress, General Deyev, to stop hostilities and begin negotiations with the Turks on the establishment of a demarcation line. The commander of the Turkish troops, at the request of the Armenian side for a ceasefire, demanded before the start of negotiations to withdraw the Armenian troops to a significant distance from the fortress and to allow the Turkish troops to freely enter the city. From Tiflis, the Armenian troops received an order to immediately cease hostilities and accept the conditions of the Turkish side. On 25 April, Armenian troops left Kars along with the city's 20,000 population. At 9 o'clock in the evening, the 11th Turkish Division entered Kars. Despite the fact that the Transcaucasian Government fulfilled all the requirements of the Turkish side, the Turks continued their offensive, and the Armenian division, under their onslaught, retreated to Alexandropol.

In connection with the continuing offensive of the Turkish army in the direction of the cities of Kutais, Alexandropol and Julfa, Germany, concerned about a possible weakening of its influence in the Transcaucasia, demanded that the Turkish command stop further advance. On 27 April, Germany and Turkey signed a secret agreement on the division of spheres of influence in the Transcaucasia: the territories already occupied by it and part of Armenia to the Kars–Alexandropol–Karaklis Railway went to Turkey, and the rest of the Transcaucasia to Germany.

Despite the sharp protests of the Armenian National Council and the resignation of Armenian representatives in the Chkhenkeli government in connection with the surrender of Kars, Chkhenkeli remained at his post and began to prepare for new negotiations with Turkey. The peace conference opened in Batum on 11 May.

== Peace conference in Batum ==
The talks, which lasted two weeks, exposed sharp foreign policy differences between the Armenian and Georgian National Councils and the Muslim National Committee. As noted by the Georgian historian Zurab Avalov, an eyewitness to the events taking place in the region, the loss of Batum dealt a blow to the economy of Georgia and Transcaucasia, while the loss of Kars threatened Armenia with complete destruction. The Azerbaijanis were in a completely different situation, who saw the Turks as a kindred people capable of helping them achieve their goals.

At the negotiations, Turkey presented even more difficult conditions than the Treaty of Brest–Litovsk envisaged – Transcaucasia was to cede two–thirds of the territory of the Erivan Governorate to Turkey, the Akhaltsikh and Akhalkalaki Districts of the Tiflis Governorate, as well as control over the Transcaucasus Railway.

Thus, Georgia was losing areas closely connected with the former Tiflis Governorate, and for Armenia the new border meant almost complete physical destruction. As Zurab Avalov notes, the adoption of these requirements dealt a blow to Transcaucasia as a union of three peoples, since after such a disengagement from Armenia there was nothing left.

== Proclamation of the independence of Georgia ==
In this situation, the Georgian National Council turned to Germany for help and patronage. The German command eagerly responded to this appeal, because under the terms of a secret agreement signed in April on the division of spheres of influence in the Transcaucasia, Georgia was already in Germany's sphere of influence. German representatives advised Georgia to immediately declare independence and officially ask Germany for patronage in order to avoid Turkish invasion and destruction.

On 24–25 May 1918, at a meeting of the executive committee of the Georgian National Council, this proposal was accepted. There it was also decided to henceforth refer to the Georgian National Council as the Parliament of Georgia.

On 25 May, German troops landed in Georgia.

== Self-dissolution of the Transcaucasian Seim and Federation ==
Even before the collapse of the Transcaucasian Federation, representatives of the Azerbaijani parties visited Istanbul on a secret mission in search of the assistance of the Young Turkish government in the proclamation of a "second Turkish state". The parties agreed on cooperation – in particular, on the assistance of the Turkish military in the creation of the armed forces of the future of Azerbaijan, their financing, assistance to the Turkish troops from the local Turkic population. The Musavat Party was preparing to announce the accession of Azerbaijan to Turkey and was campaigning. A contemporary Solomon Heifetz noted:

The agitation for joining Turkey was widespread. The Muslim clergy worked at full capacity. The movement was headed by the same Musavatists who were members of the Transcaucasian Seim. Member of the Seimas Doctor Sultanov in a Turkish officer's uniform openly traveled and campaigned in favor of the annexation of Azerbaijan. Representatives of the Musavat in Tiflis, in the palace itself, a stone's throw from the meeting room of the Seim, in their factional room received disguised Turkish emissaries.

During negotiations in Trebizond (Trebizond Conference) and in Batum (Batum Conference), the Musavat Party proposed to the Turkish side to annex the Muslim part of the South Caucasus to Turkey, but the proposal was rejected, since Turkey's big policy in the region required the preservation of a certain independence of Azerbaijan in the confederation peoples of the South Caucasus. The letter of the Azerbaijani delegation to Enver Pasha notes:

Despite our request for the complete annexation of the Muslim part of Transcaucasia to Turkey, we were motivated to explain that the big politics of Turkey requires that we be independent and strong for the time being... We have accepted these instructions, knowingly agreeing with them.

On 26 May 1918, the Transcaucasian Seim announced its self-dissolution. The decision of the Seim stated:

In view of the fact that, on the issue of war and peace, fundamental differences were revealed between the peoples who created the Transcaucasian Independent Republic, and therefore it became impossible for one authoritative government to speak on behalf of the Transcaucasia, the Seim states the fact of the disintegration of Transcaucasia and resigns its powers.

== Sources ==
- Mukhanov, Vadim (2019). "The Caucasus at a Revolutionary Time. On the History of Transcaucasia in 1917 – the First Half of 1918". Caucasus in a Critical Era (1917–1921). Moscow: Modest Kolerov. ISBN 978-5-905040-47-4.
- Avalov, Zurab (1924). The Independence of Georgia in International Politics (1918–1921): Memoirs. Essays. Paris.
- Transcaucasian Seim. Verbatim Records – Tiflis, 1920
- Documents on the Foreign Policy of Transcaucasia and Georgia – Tiflis, 1920
