= Hacallı, Goranboy =

Hacallı
- Municipality
- Location within Azerbaijan
- Coordinates: 40°28′29″N 46°44′13″E
- Country: Azerbaijan
- Rayon: Goranboy

Population
  - Total: 683
- Time zone: UTC+4 (AZT)
  - Summer (DST): UTC+5 (AZT)
- Area code: +994

Hacallı (also, Gadzhally and Gadzhialilu) is a village and municipality in the Goranboy Rayon of Azerbaijan. It has a population of 683. The municipality consists of the villages of Hacallı and Şəfibəyli. It is located 292 km (181.44 mi) away from the capital city Baku.

== History ==
The town of Hacallı is believed to have existed since the early 12th century. The village was invaded during a massive attack by the Ottomans in 1727, where an estimated 67 citizens were killed and executed. It remains the largest disaster in Hacallı 's history. Azerbaijani forces re-occupied the village in 1729, and a memorial was held the year after to commemorate those lost in the invasion.

== Geography ==
Hacallı has a cold semi-arid climate. It generally regarded as one of the hotter villages in the area, with scorching hot summers and chilly, wet, and sometimes even snowy winters. Summer temperatures reach a mean high of 35.0°C (95.0°F), whilst average temperatures in December reach 8.6°C (43.9°F).

== Education ==
The village has one main school, Bərdə Rayon Hacallı Kənd Tam Orta Məktəbi. It was opened in 1937. The school was visited by president Ilham Aziyev and Minister of Science and Education, Emin Amrullayev back in 2015.

== Culture ==
Hacallı used to have a professional football team, IK Hacallı, which competed in the Azerbaijan Second Division between 2005 and 2009. However, the team went into bankruptcy in 2010 due to poor financial management.
