= Aydınqışlaq =

- Municipality
- Location within Azerbaijan Location within Shaki-Zagatala Economic Region
- Coordinates: 40°55′23″N 47°48′38″E
- Country: Azerbaijan
- Rayon: Qabala

Population
  - Total: 2,026
- Time zone: UTC+4 (AZT)
  - Summer (DST): UTC+5 (AZT)

Aydınqışlaq (also, Aydin-Kishlyag, Aydynkyshlak, and Aydynkyshlakh) is a village and municipality in the Qabala Rayon of Azerbaijan, which is located in the Shaki-Zagatala Economic Region. It has a population of 2,026.

== See also ==
- Shafibeyli clan
