= Trebizond Peace Conference =

1918 conference between the Ottoman Empire and Transcaucasia

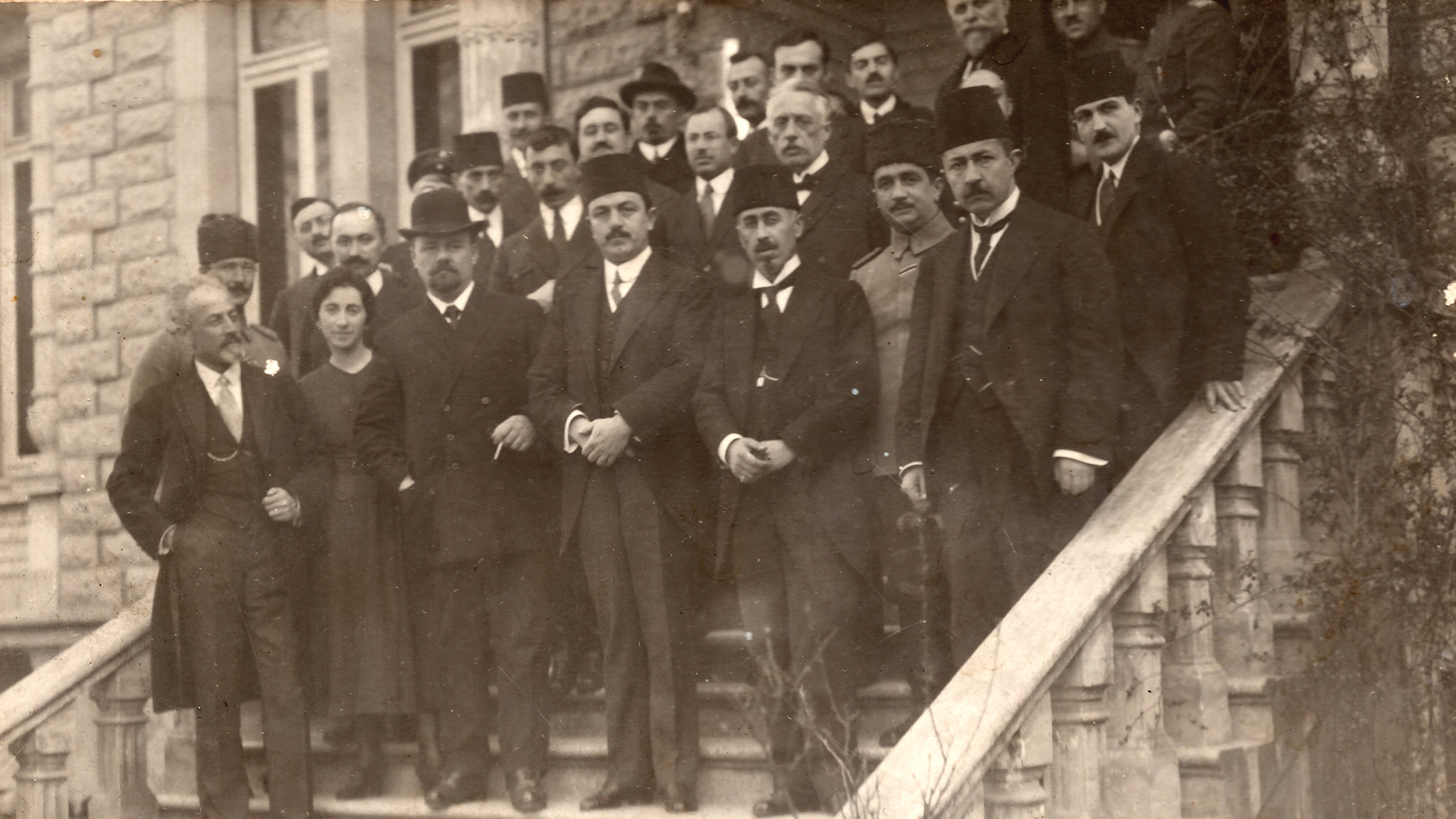
Group photo of the Transcaucasian and Ottoman participants of the Conference. Akaki Chkhenkeli, Hüseyin Rauf Bey and Khalil bey Khasmammadov stand in front

The Trebizond Peace Conference was a conference held between 14 March and 13 April 1918 in Trebizond between the Ottoman Empire and a delegation of the Transcaucasian Diet (Transcaucasian Seim) and government. The opening session was on 14 March 1918. The representatives were Rear-Admiral Hüseyin Rauf Bey for the Ottoman Empire, and Akaki Chkhenkeli, Khalil bey Khasmammadov, Alexander Khatisian etc. as the Transcaucasian delegation.

The Armistice of Erzincan signed by the Russian and Ottomans in Erzincan on December 5, 1917, ended the armed conflicts between Russia and Ottoman Empire in the Persian Campaign and Caucasus Campaign of the Middle Eastern theatre of World War I. The armistice was followed by the Treaty of Brest-Litovsk on March 3, 1918, between the Russian SFSR and the Central Powers, marking Russia's exit from World War I. The Ottoman Empire and the Transcaucasian Democratic Federative Republic confronted each other as the Treaty of Brest-Litovsk imposed borders that conflicted with those claimed by each party. The delegation established by Sejm was regarded by the Ottoman Empire as representing, not a state, but instead the peoples of the region.

== Positions ==
The Ottoman delegation expressed the wish that ‘Transcaucasia should proclaim its independence and announce its form of government before the negotiations then under way were completed.' The Ottoman Empire wanted to break down the barrier between Anatolian Muslims and Caucasian Muslims and to ‘consolidate the unity between kindred nations.’ The Ottoman Empire’s special tasks in the Caucasus, Rauf Bey reassured, reflected links between the Empire and the Caucasian peoples that were "...not only historical and geographical, but rather ones of blood, flowing from their common past."

Ahmed bey Pepinov, an advisor to the Transcaucasian delegation and a member of the Muslim National Council, suggested setting up a fourth, separate administrative unit consisting of the Muslim areas of the Batum and Kars regions. ‘The bonds created by their similarities of race, religion, economy and everyday life are very strong and it will be very hard for them to exist without each other’,’ Pepinov argued in ‘grounding’ that wish.

== Aftermath ==
At the end of the negotiations, Enver Pasha offered to surrender all the Empire's ambitions in the Caucasus in return for recognition of the Ottoman reacquisition of the east Anatolian provinces at Brest-Litovsk.

On April 5, the head of the Transcaucasian delegation Akaki Chkhenkeli accepted the Treaty of Brest-Litovsk as a basis for more negotiations and wired the governing bodies urging them to accept this position. The mood prevailing in Tiflis was very different. They expressed greater determination. Treaty of Brest-Litovsk united the Armenian-Georgian block. The Armenians pressured the Republic to refuse. They acknowledged the existence of a state of war between themselves and the Ottoman Empire.

Hostilities resumed and the Ottoman troops overran new lands to the east, reaching prewar frontiers.

On May 11, a new peace conference opened at Batum. At this conference, the Ottomans extended their demands to include Tiflis as well as Alexandropol and Echmiadzin, which they wanted a railroad built to, to connect Kars and Julfa with Baku. The Armenian state, through which this transport corridor would run, was to give free right of passage. The Armenian and Georgian members of the Republic’s delegation began to stall.

Beginning on May 21, the Ottoman army moved ahead once again into areas of Russian Armenia that had not been under the Sultan’s control since the seventeenth century. The conflict led to the Battle of Sardarapat (May 21–29), the Battle of Kara Killisse (1918) (May 24–28), and the Battle of Bash Abaran (May 21–24).

On June 4, the First Republic of Armenia was forced to sign the Treaty of Batum.
