= Kita Chkhenkeli =

Kita "Petre" Chkhenkeli
- კიტა "პეტრე" ჩხენკელი
- Born: November 8, 1895; Kutaisi, Kutaisi Governorate], Russian Empire
- Died: October 22, 1963 (aged 67); Zurich
- Occupations: Linguist and lexicographer

Kita "Petre" Chkhenkeli (Georgian: კიტა "პეტრე" ჩხენკელი; Tschenkéli in western literature) (8 November 1895 – 22 October 1963) was a Georgian linguist and lexicographer based in Germany and Switzerland. He is best known for his Georgisch-Deutsches Wörterbuch, which is "widely regarded as the most comprehensive Georgian dictionary in any western language."

== Biography ==
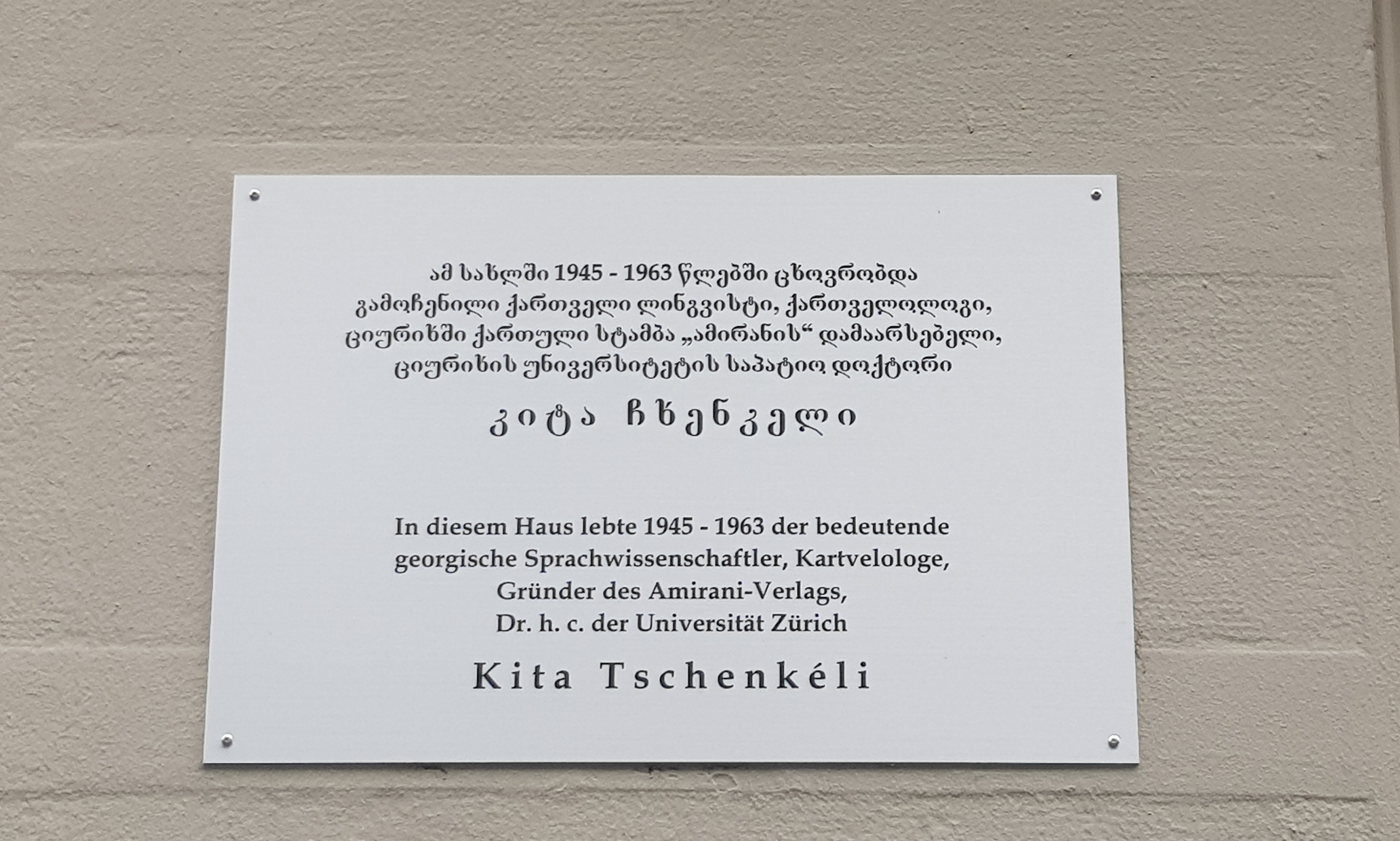
Plaque for Kita Chkhenkeli in Zurich, Theater Street 4

Tschenkéli was born in Kutaisi, the second largest city of Georgia, then part of the Russian Empire. He was a younger brother of the prominent Social-Democratic politician Akaki Chkhenkeli. He studied law and world literature at the University of Moscow from 1913 to 1917. Returning to Georgia after the Russian Revolution of 1917, Tschenkéli obtained, in 1920, a state bursary to continue his education in Germany, where he attended the universities of Halle and Hamburg. The fall of the Georgian republic to the Bolshevik invasion in 1921 precluded his return to the homeland. He lectured at the University of Hamburg and, after the end of World War II, moved to Zürich, where he taught the Georgian and Russian languages. In 1961, he obtained the honorary degree of doctorate from the University of Zürich. Tschenkéli died in Zurich of pneumonia. His grave has been lost.

== Works ==
Tschenkéli's principal contribution to the Georgian studies consists of a grammar (1958), chrestomathy (1958), and a voluminous Georgian-German dictionary, which was published posthumously from 1965 to 1974. Together with Ruth Neukomm, he also contributed to and edited the German translations of the medieval Georgian epics Visramiani (Wisramiani: oder die Geschichte der Liebe von Wis und Ramin, 1957) and The Knight in the Panther's Skin (Der Mann im Pantherfell, 1974).
