= Şəfibəyli, Goranboy =

Şəfibəyli
- Location within Azerbaijan
- Coordinates: 40°28′53″N 46°42′28″E
- Country: Azerbaijan
- Rayon: Goranboy
- Municipality: Hacallı
- Time zone: UTC+4 (AZT)
  - Summer (DST): UTC+5 (AZT)

Şəfibəyli (also, Shafibeili and Shafibeyli) is a village in the Goranboy Rayon of Azerbaijan. The village forms part of the municipality of Hacallı.
