= Şəfibəyli, Zangilan =

Şəfibəyli
- Location within Azerbaijan
- Coordinates: 39°03′50″N 46°36′56″E
- Country: Azerbaijan
- District: Zangilan
- Time zone: UTC+4 (AZT)
  - Summer (DST): UTC+5 (AZT)

Şəfibəyli (Shafibeyli) is a village in the Zangilan District of Azerbaijan.

== History ==
The village was located in the Armenian-occupied territories surrounding Nagorno-Karabakh, coming under the control of ethnic Armenian forces in 1993 during the First Nagorno-Karabakh War.

The village subsequently became part of the self-proclaimed Republic of Artsakh as part of its Kashatagh Province and was renamed Khachadzor (Armenian: Խաչաձոր).

It was recaptured by Azerbaijan during the 2020 Nagorno-Karabakh war on or around November 4, 2020.
