= Kiçik Pireli =

- Municipality
- Location within Azerbaijan Location within Shaki-Zagatala Economic Region
- Coordinates: 40°55′N 47°42′E
- Country: Azerbaijan
- Rayon: Qabala

Population
  - Total: 703
- Time zone: UTC+4 (AZT)

Kiçik Pireli (also, Kiçik Pirelli, Kichik Pirali, and Kichik-Pirelli) is a village and municipality in the Qabala Rayon of Azerbaijan. It has a population of 703.
