= Treaty of Batum =

Treaty signed by the Democratic Republic of Armenia and the Ottoman Empire

Treaty of Batumi
- Type: Peace treaty
- Signed: 4 June 1918
- Location: Batumi, Georgia
- Condition: Ratification
- Signatories: Ottoman Empire; Armenia; Azerbaijan; Georgia

The Treaty of Batum was signed in Batumi on 4 June 1918, between the Ottoman Empire and the three Transcaucasian states: the First Republic of Armenia, the Azerbaijan Democratic Republic and the Democratic Republic of Georgia. It was the first treaty of the First Republic of Armenia and the Azerbaijan Democratic Republic and had 14 articles.

== Background ==
On 5 December 1917, the armistice of Erzincan was signed between the Russians and the Ottomans, ending the armed conflicts between Russia and the Ottoman Empire in the Persian Campaign and Caucasus Campaign of the Middle Eastern theatre of World War I. This was followed by Russia's exit from World War I on 3 March 1918 under the Treaty of Brest-Litovsk. Between 14 March and April 1918, the Trabzon peace conference was held between the Ottoman Empire and the delegation of the Transcaucasian Sejm, the ruling body of Transcaucasia which had distanced itself from Soviet Russia.

Enver Pasha offered to surrender all ambitions in the Caucasus in return for recognition of the Ottoman reacquisition of the east Anatolian provinces at Brest-Litovsk at the end of the negotiations. On 5 April, the head of the Transcaucasian delegation Akaki Chkhenkeli accepted the Treaty of Brest-Litovsk as a basis for more negotiations and wired the governing bodies urging them to accept that position. The mood prevailing in Tiflis was very different. The Armenians pressured the Commissariat to refuse and acknowledged the existence of a state of war between themselves and the Ottoman Empire. Hostilities resumed, and the Ottoman troops overran new lands to the east, reaching the prewar borders. Approximately 40,000 civilians perished during the retreat of Armenian-Georgian volunteers and the Ottoman advance. According to Clarence Ussher, an American doctor in eastern Anatolia, the number of Armenians killed during the Russian retreat numbered 7,000.

== Treaty ==
On 11 May, a new peace conference opened at Batum. the Ottomans extended their demands to include Tiflis as well as Alexandropol and Echmiadzin; they also wanted a railroad to be built to connect Kars and Julfa with Baku. The new Armenian state, through which the transport corridor would run, was to give free right of passage. The Armenian and Georgian members of the Republic's delegation began to stall. Beginning on 21 May, the Ottoman army moved ahead once again into areas of Russian Armenia, leading to the Battle of Sardarapat (21–29 May), the Battle of Karakilisa (24–28 May), and the Battle of Bash Abaran (21–24 May).

The treaty was signed while the Third Army of the Ottoman Empire held positions 7 km from Yerevan and only 10 km from Echmiadzin. The treaty needed to be examined and confirmed by the Central Powers. Fifteen days after the treaty, delegates from Armenia were asked to come to Constantinople. In the surrendered territories the majority of the 1,250,000 pre-war inhabitants had been Armenians, with more than 400,000 in the ceded sector of Yerevan province alone.

The treaty left Armenians with less than one ninth of Eastern Armenia. German diplomat Bernstorff commented on the treaty, stating that "Turkey has left only lake Sevan for the Armenians, where they can swim, but they don’t have a place to come out and get dry".

== Signatories ==
Ottoman side:

- Halil Menteshe – Minister of Justice
- Wehib Pasha – commander of the Third Army during the Caucasus Campaign

Armenian side:

- Avetis Aharonian – Chairman of the National Council
- Alexander Khatisian – Minister of Foreign Affairs
- M. Babachanian
- Ghorghanian

Azerbaijani side:

- Mammad Amin Rasulzade – President of the National Council
- Mammad Hasan Hajinski – Minister of Foreign Affairs

Georgian side:

- Noe Ramishvili – Prime Minister
- Ilia Odishelidze – Deputy Minister of Defense
- Giorgi Gvazava – member of the presidium of the National Council
- Grigol Rtskhiladze – member of the National Council

== Statistics ==
Ethnoreligious composition of territories ceded in the Treaty of Batum
Area	Territory occupied	Armenians	Muslims	Georgians	Russians
Tiflis Governorate
↳ Akhalkalaki uezd	1,150 mi^{2} (3,000 km^{2})	64,000	8,000	8,000	8,000
↳ Akhaltsikhe uezd	1,100 mi^{2} (2,800 km^{2})	27,000	18,000	25,000	540
Erivan Governorate
↳ Alexandropol uezd	750 mi^{2} (1,900 km^{2})	173,000	3,000	420	2,000
↳ Nakhichevan uezd	1,500 mi^{2} (3,900 km^{2})				
↳ Surmalu uezd	1,400 mi^{2} (3,600 km^{2})	30,000	66,000		
↳ Sharur-Daralayaz uezd	600 mi^{2} (1,600 km^{2})	500	12,000		60
↳ Erivan uezd	700 mi^{2} (1,800 km^{2})	30,000	48,000		1,000
↳ Etchmiadzin uezd	900 mi^{2} (2,300 km^{2})	76,000	42,000		400
Treaty of Batum	8,100 mi^{2} (21,000 km^{2})	400,500	197,000	33,420	12,000
