= Armistice of Erzincan =

Temporary Treaty during World War I

- Signed: 18 December 1917; 108 years ago (5 December O.S.)
- Location: Erzincan
- Condition: Ratification
- Parties: Ottoman Empire (Transcaucasian Democratic Federative Republic) Transcaucasian Commissariat

Full text
- Armistice of Erzincan at Wikisource

The Armistice of Erzincan (also spelled Erzindzhan or Erzinjan) was an agreement to suspend hostilities during World War I signed by the Ottoman Empire and Transcaucasian Commissariat in Erzincan on 18 December 1917 (5 December O.S.). The armistice brought temporary peace to the Caucasian and Persian Fronts until 12 February 1918, when the fighting was resumed.

The status of the Transcaucasian Commissariat was unclear at the time: the Ottomans regarded it as an independent entity, a legal successor of the Russian Empire, while the Commissariat still considered itself a part of the Russian Republic. The Ottoman Empire was already party to the Brest-Litovsk armistice with Russia (15 December) that covered the Caucasian and Persian Fronts. After receiving a ceasefire proposal from Vehib Pasha, commander of the Ottoman Third Army, the Commissariat authorised the commander of the Russian Caucasus Front, General Przhevalski, to negotiate an armistice with his Ottoman opposite. The result was the Erzincan Armistice, after which the Russian troops began to withdraw, leaving the Transcaucasian Commissariat completely undefended.

A supplement to the armistice was signed on the same day, demarcating the line of occupation between the two sides. On 24 February 1918, the Brest-Litovsk armistice was broken by Germany and became of no effect. Both armistices were superseded by the Treaty of Brest-Litovsk with Russia, signed on 3 March 1918, and the Treaty of Batum with the successor states of the Transcaucasian Commissariat, signed 4 June 1918.
