= Akaki Chkhenkeli =

Georgian politician and publicist

- აკაკი ჩხენკელი
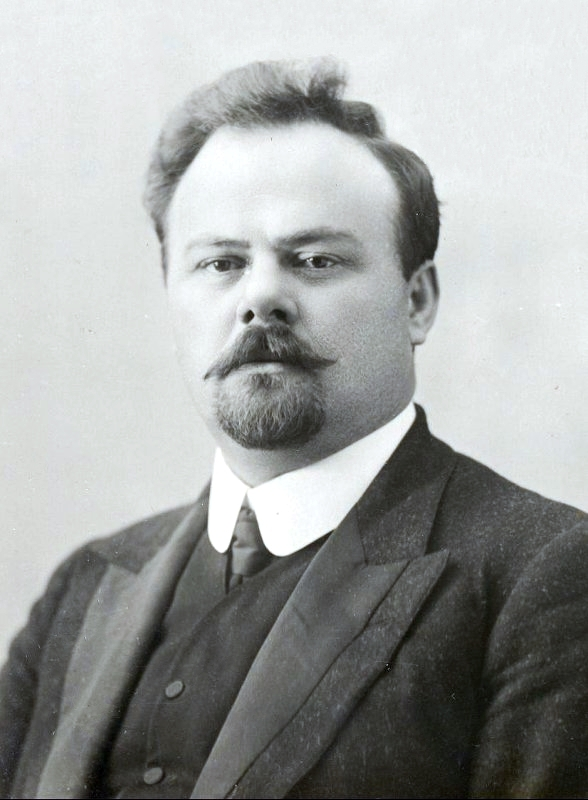

Prime Minister of the Transcaucasian Democratic Federative Republic
- In office 26 April 1918 – 26 May 1918
- Preceded by: Office established
- Succeeded by: Office abolished

Minister of Foreign Affairs of the Transcaucasian Democratic Federative Republic
- In office 26 April 1918 – 26 May 1918
- Preceded by: Office established
- Succeeded by: Office abolished

Minister of Foreign Affairs of the Democratic Republic of Georgia
- In office 26 May 1918 – November 1918
- Preceded by: Office established
- Succeeded by: Evgeni Gegechkori

Personal details
- Born: May 19, 1874 Okumi, Sukhum Okrug, Kutais Governorate, Russian Empire (now Georgia)
- Died: January 5, 1959 (aged 84) Paris, France
- Party: Social Democratic (Menshevik) Party of Georgia
- Spouse: Markine
- Children: 1 (Aleksei)
- Education: Saint Vladimir Imperial University of Kiev
- Profession: Politician

Akaki Chkhenkeli (Georgian: აკაკი ჩხენკელი; 19 May 1874 – 5 January 1959) was a Georgian Social Democratic politician and publicist who acted as one of the leaders of the Menshevik movement in Russia and Georgia. In 1918 he served as the prime minister and foreign minister of the Transcaucasian Democratic Federative Republic, and then became foreign minister of the Democratic Republic of Georgia. In 1921 he was appointed the Georgian Minister to France, though was unable to serve as the Red Army invaded Georgia. His younger brother was the linguist Kita Tschenkéli.

== Life ==
He was born in the town of Okumi, Georgia, then part of Imperial Russia, to a noble family. A graduate of universities in Kiev, Berlin, and London, he was a lawyer and a literature expert. He joined the Social Democratic movement in 1898 and sided with the Menshevik faction in 1903. He was involved in the Russian Revolution of 1905 and was briefly arrested in its aftermath. He was elected to the Fourth State Duma where he advocated self-determination for the peoples of Russia. After the February Revolution of 1917, he worked for the Special Transcaucasian Committee as a Commissar for Internal Affairs and was elected, in June 1917, a member of All-Russian Central Executive Committee. He was instrumental in convincing the Soviets to reverse the 1904 cession of Gagra and areas west of the Bzyb River to Russia.

In March 1918 he led a delegation to Trabzon to negotiate with the Ottoman Empire over territory that had been ceded in the Treaty of Brest-Litovsk, namely Batumi; as Georgia had not been consulted, they were not willing to give up land. However the Ottoman delegation refused to listen as the Georgians were not party to the treaty, nor even a recognized state. By 10 April Chkhenkeli agreed to use the Treaty as a basis for negotiations, though this was largely a formality, as the Ottoman forces had occupied most of the territory they were promised.

== Government positions ==
Chkhenkeli served as prime minister and as foreign minister of the Transcaucasian Democratic Federative Republic, which united Armenia, Azerbaijan, and Georgia; his cabinet reflected the diversity of the republic, with Armenians holding four positions, Azerbaijanis five, and Georgians four. Chkhenkeli stated five main goals for the newly formed state: drafting a constitution; finalizing its borders; ending the war; suppressing anarchy within the state; and land reform.

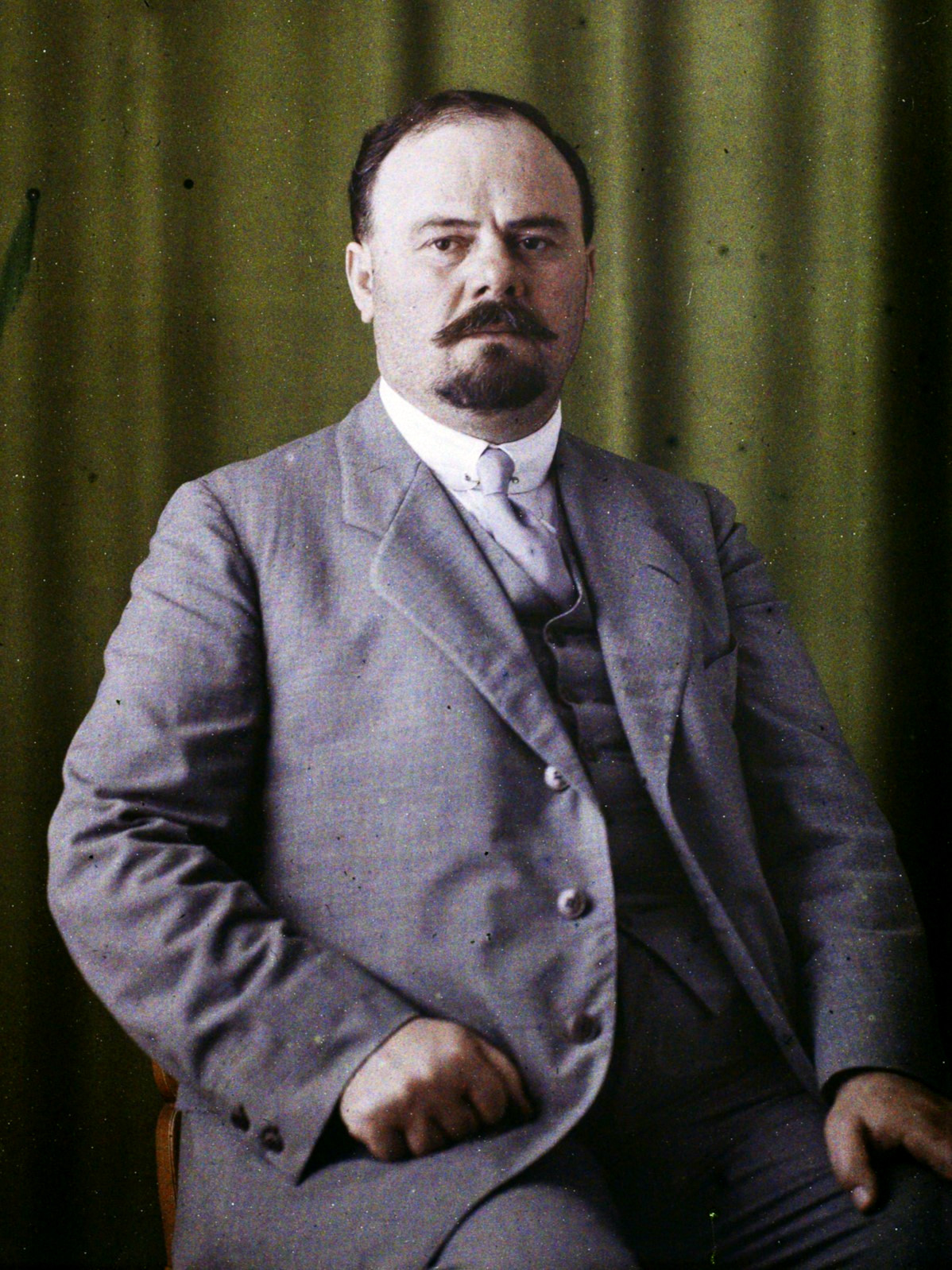
Autochrome portrait of Chkhenkeli by Auguste Léon, 1921.

With continued pressure from Ottoman forces, Chkhenkeli urged other Georgian leaders that independence for Georgia was the best course of action, which they consented to, forming the Democratic Republic of Georgia on 26 May 1918, with Chkhenkeli remaining as foreign minister. In this capacity he signed a treaty with the German forces in the Caucasus for protection, and travelled to Berlin for further negotiations. With the conclusion of the war and defeat of Germany, Chkhenkeli, who was pro-German, was replaced as foreign minister by Evgeni Gegechkori, who was more pro-French. He did lead the Georgian delegation to the Paris Peace Conference, but achieved nothing for Georgia there.

He was elected to the Constituent Assembly of Georgia in 1919. On 26 January 1921 the Georgian government appointed him Minister to France; however the day he presented his credentials to the French President, 26 February, was the same day the Red Army occupied Tbilisi, effectively ending the Democratic Republic of Georgia.

== Emigration and death ==
After the Soviet occupation, he worked in France, where he served as the Georgian ambassador to France until 1934. He died after a short illness on January 3, 1959 in Paris. He was buried in the Georgian cemetery of Leuville.

== Bibliography ==
- Чхенкели, Акакий Иванович. (in Russian)
- Kazemzadeh, Firuz (1951), The Struggle for Transcaucasia (1917–1921), New York City: Philosophical Library, ISBN 978-0-95-600040-8
- Rayfield, Donald (2012), Edge of Empires: A History of Georgia, London: Reaktion Books, ISBN 978-1-78-023030-6
- Swietochowski, Tadeusz (1985), Russian Azerbaijan, 1905–1920: The Shaping of National Identity in a Muslim Community, Cambridge, United Kingdom: Cambridge University Press, ISBN 0-521522-45-5
