= United Armenia =

Armenian irredentist concept

United Armenia Միացեալ Հայաստան (Armenian)
- Main languages: Armenian; Turkish; Azeri; Kurdish

Integrated parts of Georgia, Turkey, and Azerbaijan, along with Republic of Armenia

Area
  - Total: 182,119 km^{2} (70,317 sq mi)

Population
  - Estimate: 9-10 million Armenians: 3 million

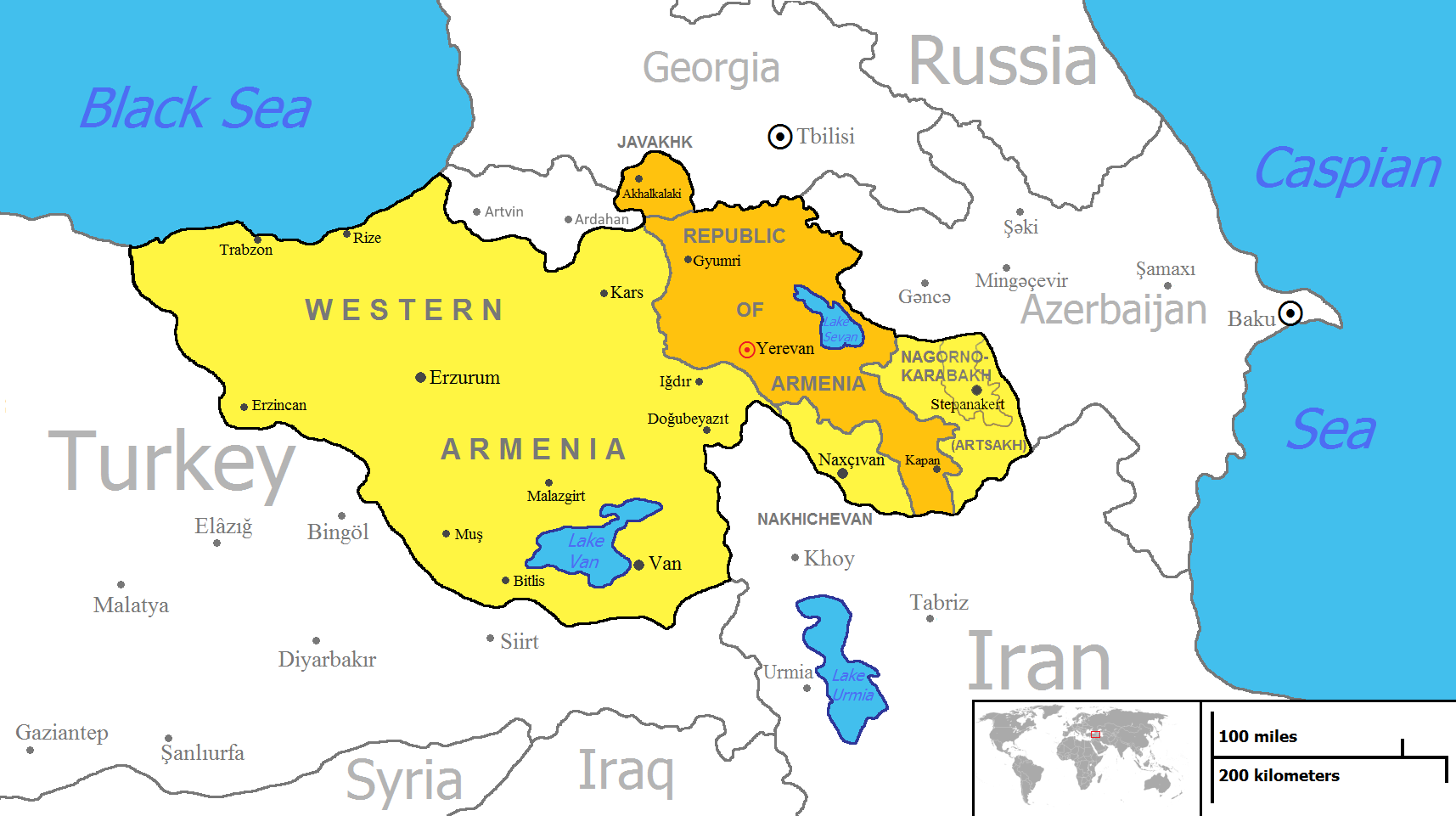
The modern concept of United Armenia as claimed by the Armenian Revolutionary Federation. Areas overwhelmingly populated by Armenians (Republic of Armenia: 98% and Javakheti: 95%). Historically Armenian areas with presently no or insignificant Armenian population after massacres (1894–1897), genocide (1915–1917) and expulsions (2023) (Western Armenia, Nakhichevan, and the former Republic of Artsakh in Nagorno-Karabakh). Note: Artsakh (Nagorno-Karabakh) is shown in pre-2020 de facto borders.

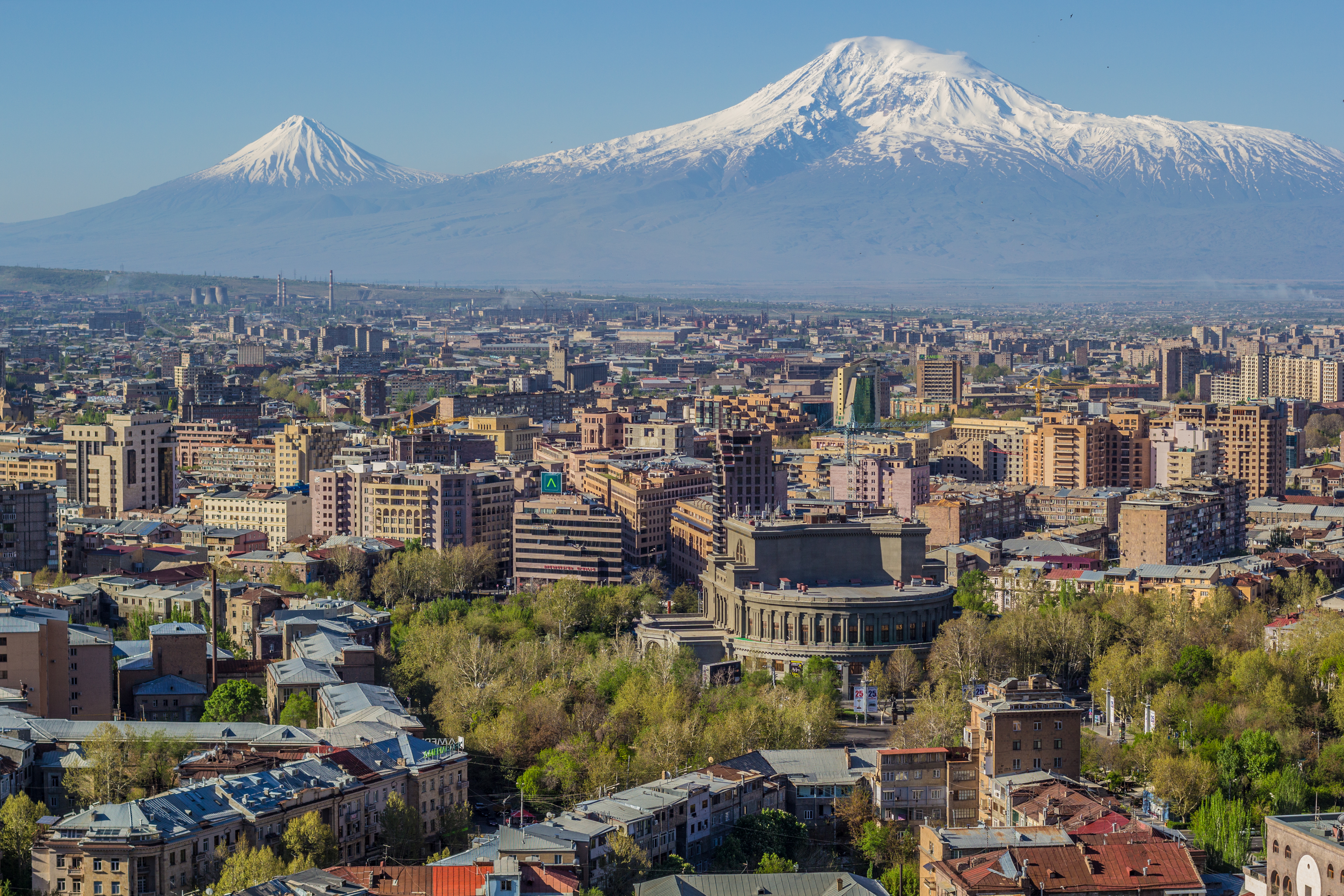
Mount Ararat, today located in Turkey, as seen from Armenia's capital Yerevan. The mountain is a symbol of Western Armenia for many Armenians. (Note: "The lands of Western Armenia which Mt. Ararat represent..." "Mount Ararat is the symbol of banal irredentism for the territories of Western Armenia." "...Ararat, which is in the territory of modern Turkey but symbolizes the dream of all Armenians around the globe about the lands lost to the west of this biblical mountain.")

United Armenia (Armenian: Միացեալ Հայաստան, romanized: Miats'eal Hayastan), (Note: Reformed spelling: Միացյալ Հայաստան) also known as Greater Armenia or Great Armenia, is an Armenian ethno-nationalist irredentist concept referring to areas within the traditional Armenian homeland—the Armenian highlands—which are currently or have historically been mostly populated by Armenians. The idea of what Armenians see as unification of their historical lands was prevalent throughout the 20th century and has been advocated by individuals, various organizations and institutions, including the nationalist parties Armenian Revolutionary Federation (ARF or Dashnaktsutyun) and Heritage, the ASALA and others. The Republic of Armenia comprises 10%–15% of the Armenian homeland.

The ARF idea of "United Armenia" incorporates claims to Western Armenia (eastern Turkey), Nagorno-Karabakh (Artsakh), the landlocked exclave Nakhchivan (Nakhichevan) of Azerbaijan and the Javakheti (Javakhk) region of Georgia. Javakheti is overwhelmingly inhabited by Armenians. Western Armenia and Nakhchivan had significant Armenian populations until the early 20th century, and Nagorno-Karabakh until 2023, but no longer do. The Armenian population of Western Armenia was almost completely exterminated during the 1915 Armenian genocide, when the millennia-long Armenian presence in this region largely ended and Armenian cultural heritage was mainly destroyed by the Ottoman government. In 1919, the ARF-dominated government of the First Republic of Armenia declared the formal unification of Armenian lands.

The ARF bases its claims to Western Armenia, now controlled by Turkey, on the 1920 Treaty of Sèvres, which was effectively negated by subsequent historical events. These territorial claims are often seen as the ultimate goal of the recognition of the Armenian Genocide and as part of Armenian genocide reparations.

The most recent Armenian irredentist movement, the Karabakh movement which began in 1988, sought to unify Nagorno-Karabakh with then-Soviet Armenia. As a result of the subsequent war with Azerbaijan, Armenian forces established effective control over most of Nagorno-Karabakh and the surrounding districts, thus succeeding in the de facto unification of Armenia and Karabakh. Some Armenian nationalists consider Nagorno-Karabakh "the first stage of a United Armenia."

== History of the claims ==
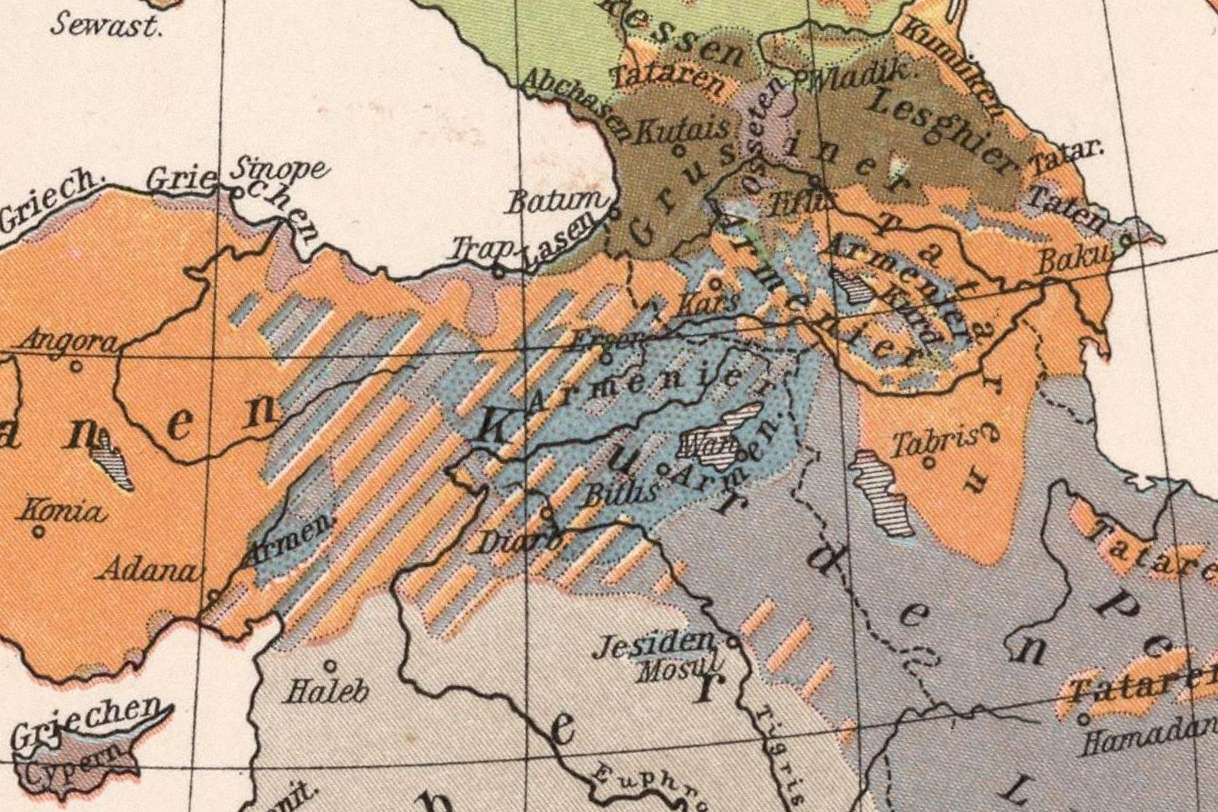
An ethnographic map of the Armenian Highland (and the wider Asia Minor and the Caucasus), made by Richard Andree in 1905. Armenians are labeled in blue.

=== Origins ===
In its current meaning, the term "United Armenia" was coined during the Armenian national awakening in the second half of the 19th century. During this period, the Armenian-populated areas were divided between the Russian Empire (Eastern Armenia) and the Ottoman Empire (Western Armenia). One of the earliest uses of the phrase "United Armenia" is by the English Society of Friends of Russian Freedom in an 1899 edition of Free Russia monthly. It quotes a confidential report of Grigory Golitsin (the Russian governor of the Caucasus) sent to Tsar Nicholas II "containing suggestions for a future policy." Golitsin writes of a nationalist movement which "aims at the restoration of the independent Armenia of the past", and that "their ideal is one great and united Armenia."

The idea of an independent and united Armenia was the main goal of the Armenian national liberation movement during the late nineteenth and early twentieth centuries. By the 1890s, a low-intensity armed conflict developed between the three major Armenian parties—the Armenian Revolutionary Federation (Dashnak), Hnchak and Armenakan— and the Ottoman government. Calls from the great powers for reforms in the Armenian provinces and Armenian aspirations to independence resulted in the Hamidian massacres between 1894 and 1896, during which up to 300,000 Armenian civilians were slaughtered by the order of Sultan Abdul Hamid II, after whom the massacres were named. After the 1908 Young Turk Revolution, some Armenians felt that the situation would improve; however, a year later the Adana massacre took place and Turkish-Armenian relations deteriorated further. After the Balkan Wars of 1912–1913, the Ottoman government was pressured to accept the Armenian reform package concerning the Armenian provinces in early 1914.

=== World War I and the Armenian genocide ===
Map of the 1915 Armenian genocide

The Armenians of eastern Ottoman Empire were exterminated by the Ottoman government in 1915 and the following years. An estimated 1.5 million Armenians were killed, while the survivors found refuge in other countries. These events, which are known as the Armenian genocide, are officially denied by the Turkish state, which falsely claims the killings were a result of a "civil war." The Ottoman government successfully ended the over two thousand year Armenian presence in Western Armenia.

By 1916, most of Western Armenia was occupied by the Russian Empire as part of the Caucasian Campaign of World War I. In parts of the occupied areas, especially around Van, an Armenian autonomy was briefly set up. The Russian army left the region due to the Revolution of 1917. The Ottoman Empire quickly regained the territories from the small number of irregular Armenian units. In the Caucasus, the Special Transcaucasian Committee was set up after the February Revolution.

The Bolsheviks took power in Russia through the October Revolution and soon signed the Armistice of Erzincan to stop the combat in Turkish Armenia. Russian forces abandoned their positions and left the area under weak Armenian control. The Bolsheviks set up the Transcaucasian Commissariat in the Caucasus. The Treaty of Brest-Litovsk was signed on 3 March 1918 and the Ottoman army started to regain the lost territories, taking over Kars by 25 April. Russia signed the Treaty of Brest-Litovsk with the Ottoman Empire and by April 1918 the Transcaucasian Federation proclaimed its independence from Russia. This fragile federation of Armenia, Georgia and Azerbaijan collapsed when the Turks invaded the Caucasus region. The Armenian units defeated the Turks at the Battle of Sardarabad, just 40 kilometers away from Armenia's future capital Yerevan, preventing the complete destruction of the Armenian nation.

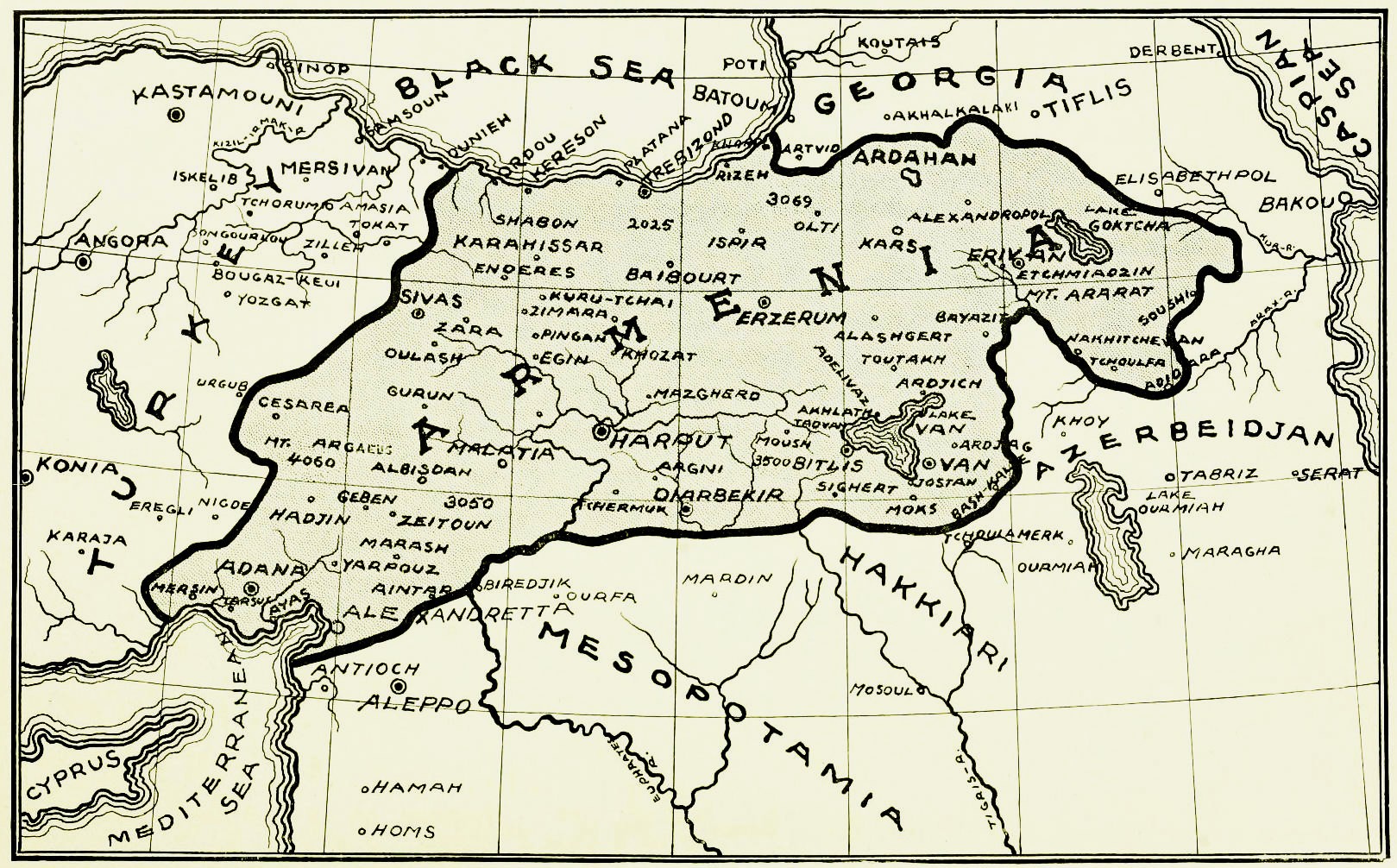
A map presented by the Armenian National Delegation (representing Ottoman Armenians) to the 1919 Paris Peace Conference.

A 1918 book by American scholars Lothrop Stoddard and Glenn Frank, titled Stakes of the War listed 8 solutions to the Armenian Question as proposed by different parties. The second proposal, titled "United Armenia", is described as follows:

A union of territories of Turkish, Russian, and Persian Armenia would result in enough area to constitute an independent state, but in no considerable section of this area would the Armenians form a clear majority of the population. To be sure, the Armenians would be the most intelligent and progressive element; but their numbers and their vitality has been greatly reduced by the long series of persecutions and massacres, and there has been such extensive destruction of property in these territories, that their potential force has been reduced as to form a serious bar to their gaining the ascendancy over the more numerous racial elements in the territory.

=== First Republic of Armenia: 1918–1920 ===
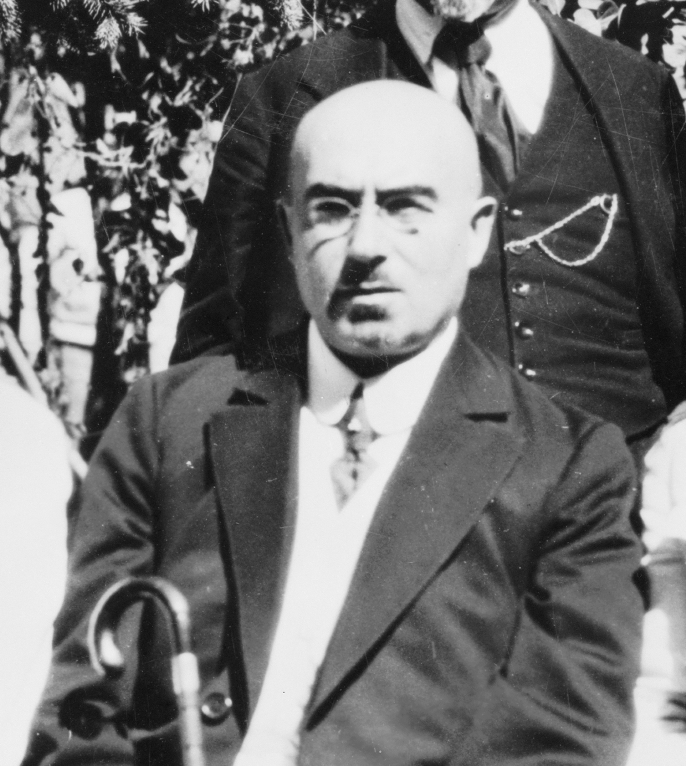
Armenia's Prime Minister Alexander Khatisian declared the formal unification of the Armenian lands in 1919.

The Armenian National Council declared the independence of the Armenian provinces on 28 May 1918. It was recognized by the Ottoman Empire by the Treaty of Batum on 4 June 1918. After its defeat in World War I, the Ottoman Empire and the Allies signed the Armistice of Mudros by which the Turkish troops left the Caucasus and by 1919 the Republic of Armenia established control over the former Kars Oblast, the city of Iğdır and its surrounding territory, including Mount Ararat.

On 28 May 1919, on the first anniversary of the Republic of Armenia, the government of the newly founded country symbolically declared the union of Eastern and Western Armenia, the latter of which was still under the full control of the Turks. Alexander Khatisian, the Armenian Prime Minister, read the declaration:

To restore the integrity of Armenia and to secure the complete freedom and prosperity of its people, the Government of Armenia, abiding by the solid will and desire of the entire Armenian people, declares that from this day forward the separated parts of Armenia are everlastingly combined as an independent political entity.

Now in promulgating this act of unification and independence of the ancestral Armenian lands located in Transcaucasia and the Ottoman Empire, the Government of Armenia declares that the political system of United Armenia is a democratic republic and that it has become the Government of the United Republic of Armenia.

Thus, the people of Armenia are henceforth the supreme lord and master of their consolidated fatherland, and the Parliament and Government of Armenia stand as the supreme legislative and executive authority conjoining the free people of United Armenia.

==== Treaty of Sèvres ====
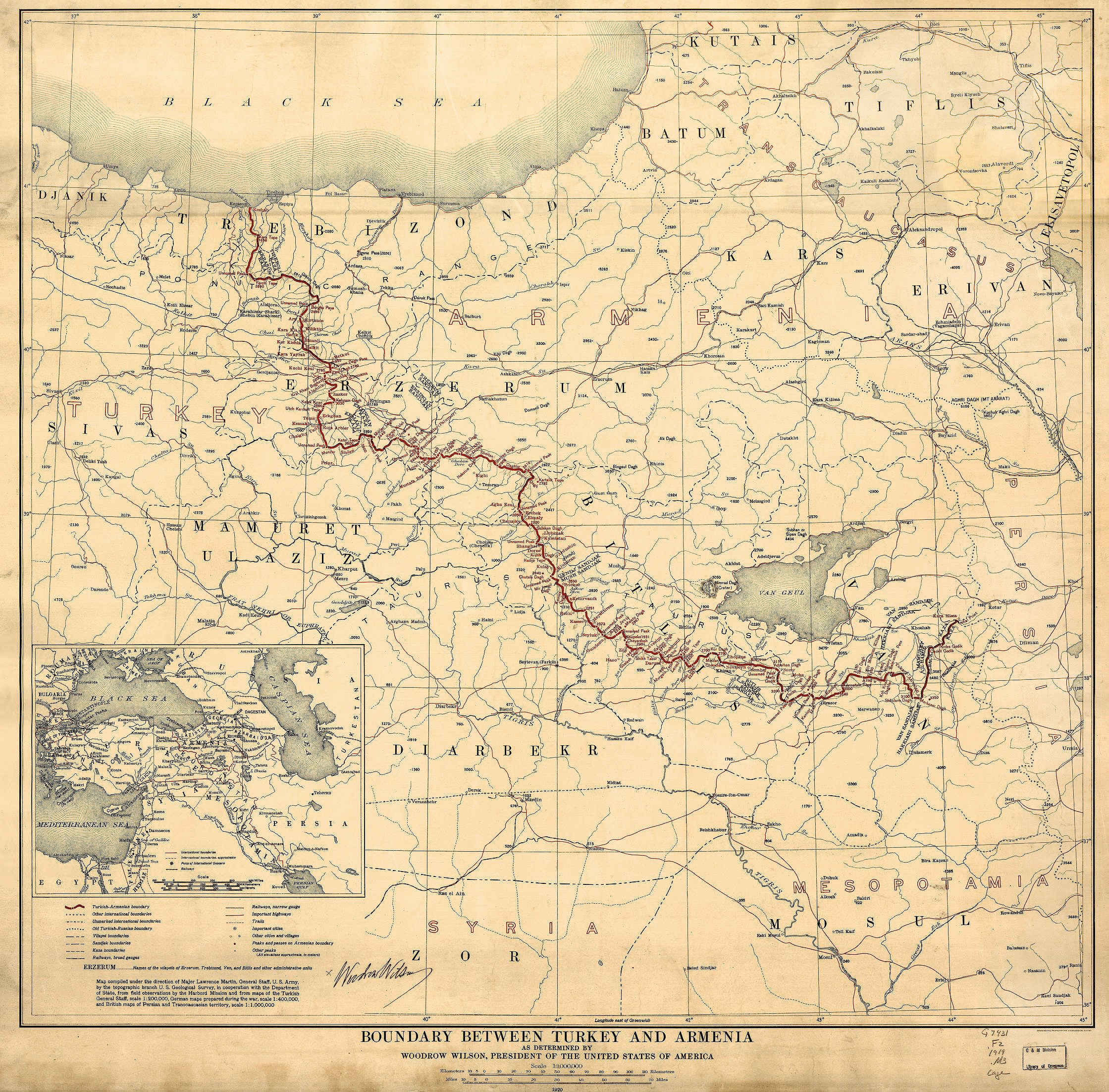
The Armenian-Turkish border by the Treaty of Sèvres

Almost two years after the Republic of Armenia was established, on 23 April 1920, the United States officially recognized it. Its frontiers were to be determined later. On 26 April 1920, the Supreme Council of the Principal Allied and Associated Powers in Paris (British Prime Minister Lloyd George, French Prime Minister Georges Clemenceau and Italian Prime Minister Francesco Saverio Nitti) requested that the United States accept the mandate over Armenia and to make an Arbitral Decision to determine the boundaries of Armenia with what is now Turkey. President Woodrow Wilson agreed to act as arbitrator and draw a mutually acceptable border between the two nations. In July 1920, the US State Department founded the Committee upon the Arbitration of the Boundary between Turkey and Armenia, headed by William Westermann. The Treaty of Sèvres was signed on 10 August 1920 between the Ottoman Empire and the Allied Powers. On 28 September 1920, the Committee submitted a report that defined the border between the two countries. It guaranteed access to the Mediterranean sea for Armenia via Trebizond and proclaimed present-day Turkey's border regions demilitarization frontier line.

A territory of 100,000 square kilometres (40,000 sq mi), formerly part of the Ottoman Empire, was given to Armenia. Based on the calculations the committee made, the ethnic structure of the 3,570,000 population would have been: 49% Muslims (Turks, Kurds, Tartar Azerbaijanis, and others), 40% Armenians, 5% Laz, 4% Greeks, and 1% others. It was expected that in the case Armenian refugees' return, they would make up to 50% of the population. Two months after the committee submitted the report to the State Department, President Woodrow Wilson received it on 12 November 1920. Ten days later, Wilson signed the report entitled "Decision of the President of the United States of America respecting the Frontier between Turkey and Armenia, Access for Armenia to the Sea, and the Demilitarization of Turkish Territory adjacent to the Armenian Frontier." The report was sent to the US ambassador in Paris Hugh Campbell Wallace on 24 November 1920. On 6 December 1920, Wallace delivered the documents to the secretary-general of the peace conference for submission to the Allied Supreme Council.

Treaty of Sèvres was later annulled following the successful Turkish War of Independence against Allied Powers and affiliated forces, which led to the abolition of the empire and founding of the modern Republic of Turkey with the Treaty of Lausanne in 1923.

==== Fall of the First Republic ====
In late September 1920, a war erupted between Armenia and the Mustafa Kemal-led Turkish nationalists (Government of the Grand National Assembly) led by Kâzım Karabekir took place. Turks captured Kars on 30 October 1920. With the Turkish army in Alexandropol, the Bolsheviks invaded the country from the north east, and on 29 November 1920, they proclaimed Armenia a Soviet state. On 2 December 1920, Armenia became a Soviet state according to a joint proclamation of Armenia's Defence Minister Dro and Soviet representative Boris Legran in Yerevan. Armenia was forced to sign the Treaty of Alexandropol with the Government of the Grand National Assembly on the night of 2–3 December 1920. The Treaty of Sèvres and Wilson's award remained "dead letters."

Just after the Soviet invasion of Armenia in November 1920, the Soviet Azerbaijani leader Nariman Narimanov declared that "the old borders between Armenia and Azerbaijan are declared null and void. Mountainous Karabagh, Zangezur, and Nakhichevan are recognized as integral parts of the Socialist Republic of Armenia." Despite these assurances, both Nakhichevan and Karabakh were kept under Azerbaijani control for another eight months. On 16 March 1921, Soviet Russia and the Government of the Grand National Assembly signed the Treaty of Moscow. By this treaty, Kars and Ardahan were ceded to Turkey, and Nakhichevan was put under "protectorate" of Azerbaijan. The Treaty of Kars was signed between the Grand National Assembly Government on one side and Armenian SSR, Georgian SSR and Azerbaijan SSR on the other, reaffirming the Treaty of Moscow.

=== Post-World War II: 1945–1953 ===
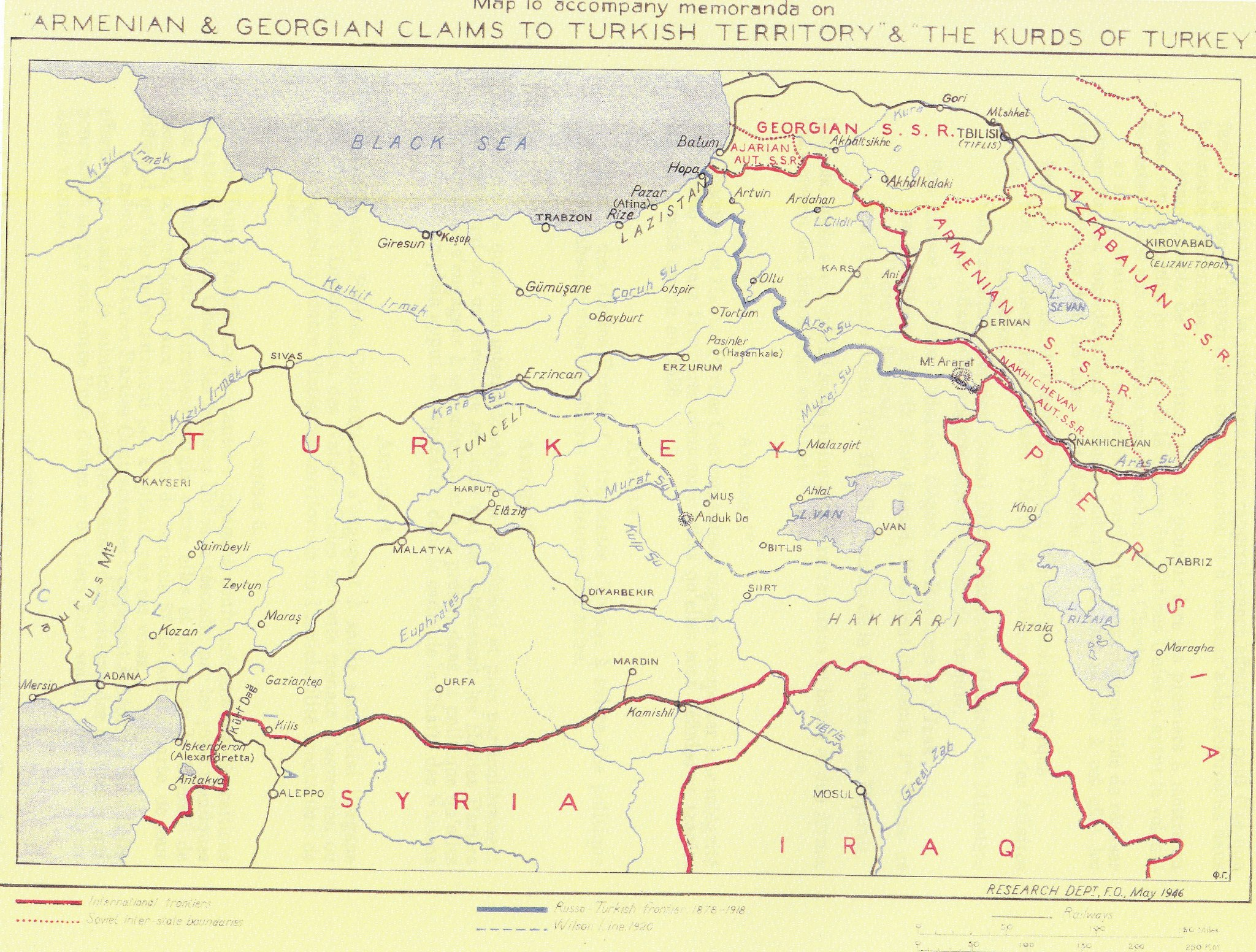
Armenian and Georgian claims to Turkish Territory, British Foreign Office, May 1946

After the end of World War II in Europe, the Soviet Union made territorial claims to Turkey. Joseph Stalin pushed Turkey to cede Kars and Ardahan, thus returning the pre-World War I boundary between the Russian and Ottoman empires. Besides these provinces, the Soviet Union also claimed the Straits (see Turkish Straits crisis). "Stalin, perhaps, expected that the Turks, shocked by the Red Army's triumph, would give up, and Washington and London accept it as a fait accompli," writes Jamil Hasanli. Athena Leoussi added, "While Stalin's motives can be debated, for Armenians at home and abroad the re-emergence of the Armenian Question revived hopes for territorial unification". On 7 June 1945 Soviet Foreign Minister Vyacheslav Molotov informed the Turkish ambassador in Moscow that the USSR demanded a revision of its border with Turkey.

To repopulate the claimed areas with Armenians, the Soviet government organized a repatriation of Armenians living abroad, mostly survivors of the Armenian Genocide. Between 1946 and 1948, 90,000 to 100,000 Armenians from Lebanon, Syria, Greece, Iran, Romania, France, and elsewhere moved to Soviet Armenia.

An Office of Strategic Services (predecessor of the CIA) document dated 31 July 1944 reported that the Armenian Revolutionary Federation changed its extreme anti-Soviet sentiment due to the rise of the Soviet power at the end of the war. In a memorandum sent to the Moscow Conference, Head of the Armenian Church Gevorg VI expressed hope that "justice will finally be rendered" to the Armenians by the "liberation of Turkish Armenia and its annexation to Soviet Armenia." Armenia's Communist leader Grigor Harutunian defended the claims, describing Kars and Ardahan "of vital importance for the Armenian people as a whole." The Soviet Armenian élite suggested that the Armenians have earned the right to Kars and Ardahan by their contribution in the Soviet struggle against fascism. Armenian diaspora organizations also supported the idea.

As the relations between the West and the Soviet Union deteriorated with the US and the UK backing Turkey, Soviet claims were out of the agenda by 1947. However, it was not until 1953, after Stalin's death, that they officially abandoned their claims, thus ending the dispute.

=== Late Cold War: 1965–1987 ===
A wave of Armenian nationalism started in the mid-1960s in the Soviet Union after Nikita Khrushchev came to power and granted relative freedom to the Soviet people during the De-Stalinization era. On 24 April 1965, the 50th anniversary of the Armenian Genocide, a mass demonstration took place in Yerevan. Thousands of Armenians poured into the streets of Yerevan to commemorate the victims of the genocide; however, their goal was not to "challenge the authority of the Soviet government", but "draw the government's attention" to the genocide and persuade the "Soviet government to assist them in reclaiming their lost lands." The Kremlin, taking into account the demands of the demonstrators, commissioned a memorial for the genocide. The memorial, which was built on Tsitsernakaberd hill, was completed in 1967.

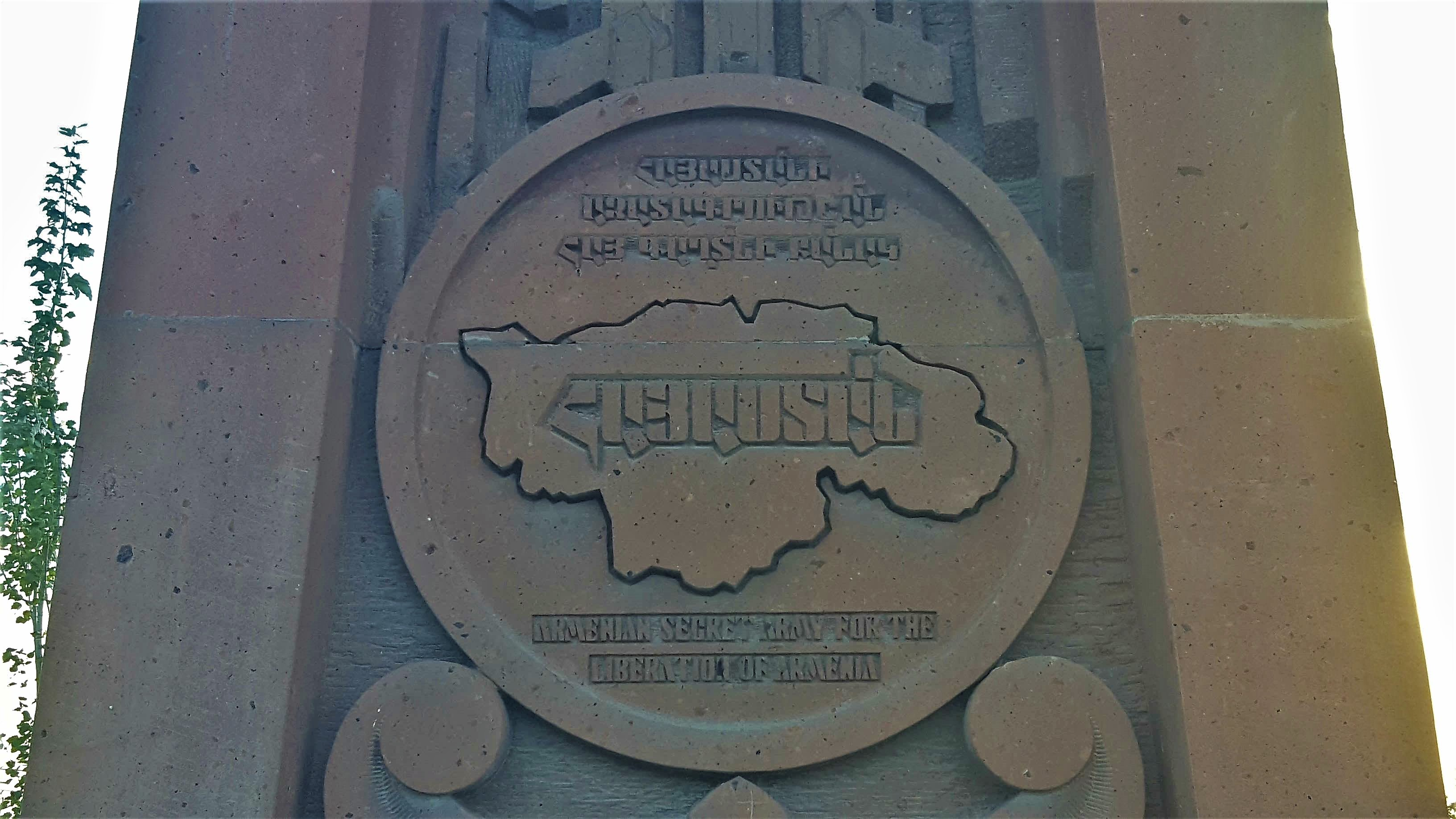
The logo of ASALA, depicted here on a memorial at the Yerablur cemetery, was the outline map of United Armenia.

The 1960s and 1970s saw a rise in underground political and armed struggle against the Soviet Union and the Turkish state in and outside of Armenia. In 1966, an underground nationalist party called the National United Party was founded by Haykaz Khachatryan in Yerevan. It secretly operated in Soviet Armenia from 1966 to the late 1980s and, after the imprisonment of its founding members in 1968, it was led by Paruyr Hayrikyan. It advocated for the creation of United Armenia through self-determination. Most of its members were arrested and the party was banned. Though the NUP was blamed for the 1977 Moscow bombings, according to historian Jay Bergman it the mastermind of the bombing has "never been determined conclusively."

According to Gerard Libaridian, "by the 1970s, the recognition of the Armenian genocide became a very important objective of the Armenian cause and diaspora political parties linked the recognition of the genocide and the dream of a greater Armenia because Turkey's recognition of the genocide would constitute the legal basis for the Armenian claims on Western Armenia." From the mid-1970s to the late 1980s, several Armenian militant (often considered terrorist) groups operated in the Middle East and Western Europe. Most notably the Armenian Secret Army for the Liberation of Armenia (ASALA) carried out armed attacks on Turkish diplomatic missions around the world. Two ARF-affiliated groups—the Justice Commandos of the Armenian Genocide (JCAG) and the Armenian Revolutionary Army (ARA)—also carried out similar attacks, mainly in Western Europe. David C. Rapoport argues that these organizations were inspired by Gourgen Yanikian, a 77-year-old Armenian genocide survivor, who assassinated two Turkish consular officials in California in 1973 as an act of revenge against Turkey.

The ASALA was the largest of the three and was mostly composed of Lebanese Armenian young adults, who claimed revenge for the Armenian genocide, which the Turkish state denies. The concept of United Armenia was one of the ultimate goals of ASALA. William Dalrymple and Olivier Roy claim that Armenian Genocide became internationalized as a result of the activities of the Armenian militant groups in the Western European countries.

=== Nagorno-Karabakh Wars: 1988–2023 ===
In February 1988 a popular nationalist movement emerged in Soviet Armenia and the Nagorno-Karabakh Autonomous Oblast (NKAO), a small Armenian-populated enclave under the jurisdiction of Soviet Azerbaijan since 1923. The movement demanded the unification of the two entities, reviving the idea of a united Armenia.

On 20 February 1988, the Nagorno-Karabakh Supreme Council (the regional legislature) issued a request to transfer the region from Soviet Azerbaijan to Soviet Armenia. The Moscow government declined the claims, while hundreds of thousands of people demonstrated in Yerevan in support of the idea. Few days later, on 26 February, an anti-Armenian pogrom broke out in the Azerbaijani seaside industrial city Sumgait, forcing thousands of Armenians to leave Azerbaijan en masse.

On 15 June 1988, the Supreme Council of Soviet Armenia voted to accept Nagorno-Karabakh into Armenia. On 17 June 1988, the Azerbaijan Supreme Soviet refused to transfer the area to Armenia, saying that it was part of Azerbaijan. The leading members of the Karabakh Committee, a group of intellectuals leading the demonstrations, were arrested in December 1988, but were freed in May 1989. On 1 December 1989, the Soviet Armenian Supreme Council and NKAO Supreme Council declared the unification of the two entities (օրենք «Հայկական ԽՍՀ-ի և Լեռնային Ղարաբաղի վերամիավորման մասին»). In January 1990, another pogrom took place against Armenians, this time in Baku. In the meantime, most Azerbaijanis of Armenia and Armenians of Azerbaijan left their homes and moved to their respective countries.

Pro-independence members were elected in the majority to the Armenian parliament in the 1990 election. On 23 August 1990, the Armenian parliament passed a resolution on sovereignty. The tensions grew even larger after the Soviet and Azeri forces deported thousands of Armenian from Shahumyan during Operation Ring in April and May 1991. After the unsuccessful August Putsch, more Soviet republics declared independence. On 2 September 1991, the Nagorno-Karabakh Republic proclaimed independence. On 21 September 1991, the Armenian independence referendum was held with the overwhelming majority voting for the independence of Armenia from the Soviet Union. On 26 November 1991, the Azerbaijani parliament abolished the autonomy of Nagorno-Karabakh. On 10 December 1991, an independence referendum was held in Nagorno-Karabakh, boycotted by the Azeri minority, and gained a vote of 99% in favor of independence.

The conflict escalated into a full-scale war with the captured Shusha by Armenian forces on 9 May 1992. By 1993, the Armenian forces took control over not only the originally disputed Nagorno-Karabakh, but also several districts surrounding the region. A ceasefire agreement was eventually signed on 5 May 1994 in Bishkek, Kyrgyzstan. According to Thomas de Waal, three factors contributed to the victory of the Armenian side: "Azerbaijan's political and military chaos, greater Russian support for the Armenians, and the Armenians' superior fighting skills." Since the 1994 ceasefire until 2020, the Armenian Nagorno-Karabakh Republic (later Artsakh) had de facto control of the territories taken over in the war.

In the wake of Armenia's defeat in 2020 Nagorno-Karabakh war, Armenian forces lost control of the occupied territories around Nagorno-Karabakh, as well as Shusha and Hadrut in Nagorno-Karabakh. In accordance with Russian-brokered ceasefire agreement, Russian peacekeepers were deployed in the Lachin corridor connecting Armenia to Nagorno-Karabakh.

Following the 2023 Azerbaijani offensive in Nagorno-Karabakh from 19 to 20 September, which ended in the total defeat and collapse of Artsakh, Azerbaijan secured full control over the region. Unable to provide further resistance, the government of Artsakh announced its surrender and formal dissolution on 1 January 2024. Nearly all Armenians in the region fled into Armenia after Azerbaijan's victory.

== Proponents ==
=== Armenian Revolutionary Federation ===
Since its foundation in 1890, the left-wing nationalist Armenian Revolutionary Federation (also known as Dashnaktsutyun or Dashnak/Tashnag) has been known as the main advocate for United Armenia. Having affiliated organizations throughout the Armenian communities abroad, the ARF is regarded as one of the most influential Armenian institutions in the world, especially in the diaspora. According to researcher Arus Harutyunyan, the party has "made it abundantly clear that historical justice will be achieved once ethnic Armenian repatriate to united Armenia, which in addition to its existing political boundaries would include" Western Armenia, Nagorno-Karabakh, Nakhichevan and Javakheti. In the 1998 party program, it states that the ARF's first goal is "The creation of a Free, Independent and United Armenia. United Armenia should include inside its borders the Armenian lands [given to Armenia] by the Sevres Treaty, as well as Artsakh, Javakheti and Nakhichevan provinces." "Free, Independent and United Armenia" is the party's main slogan, and was adopted as its "supreme objective" in the 10th Party Congress in Paris (1924–25). Hrant Markarian, ARF Bureau Chairman, stated at the 2004 party congress:

We are against any relations between Armenia and Turkey that would mean acceptance of any preconditions by us, that would require us to give up our rights or any part of them. We will keep up pressure on Turkey until we achieve full victory, until international recognition of the fact of genocide, until the creation of a United Armenia.

=== Heritage Party ===
Although the platform of the national liberal Heritage party makes no explicit reference to territorial claims, its leader and some its members have expressed their support for them. Heritage supports the formal recognition of the Nagorno-Karabakh Republic by Armenia and has introduced bills for the recognition of the NKR to the Armenian National Assembly in 2007, 2010, and 2012. Although all three attempts were voted down by the ruling Republican Party. Its leader, Raffi Hovannisian (post-Soviet Armenia's first foreign minister), has hinted at Western Armenia, Javakheti and Nakhichevan with "vague formulations." For instance, during a 2013 speech about his future plans Hovannisian stated that "only with [the existence of a] government belonging to the people will we have awareness of our national interest—with Artsakh, Javakhk, Western Armenia—and future for our children." In 2011, a leading party member, Zaruhi Postanjyan, stated in an open letter to presidents of Armenia and NKR that by organizing a repatriation of diaspora Armenians to Armenia and Nagorno-Karabakh, "we will [create a] base for the liberation of our entire homeland."

In an April 2015 conference on the Armenian Genocide centenary Postanjyan stated that Armenia should "restore its territorial integrity" by claiming the "territory of its historic homeland." When asked about how realistic Armenian claims to its historic lands are, Heritage leader Hovannisian responded: "Today's romantic will become tomorrow's realist." In an opinion piece published in The Jerusalem Post on 11 April 2015 Hovannisian wrote that Turkey occupies Western Armenia and called for "the creation of an Armenian national hearth in historic Western Armenia." He added, "negotiations between the republics of Turkey and Armenia triggering the first-ever sovereign reciprocal demarcation of the official frontier, including but not limited to provisions for an Armenian easement to the Black Sea."

=== Other ===
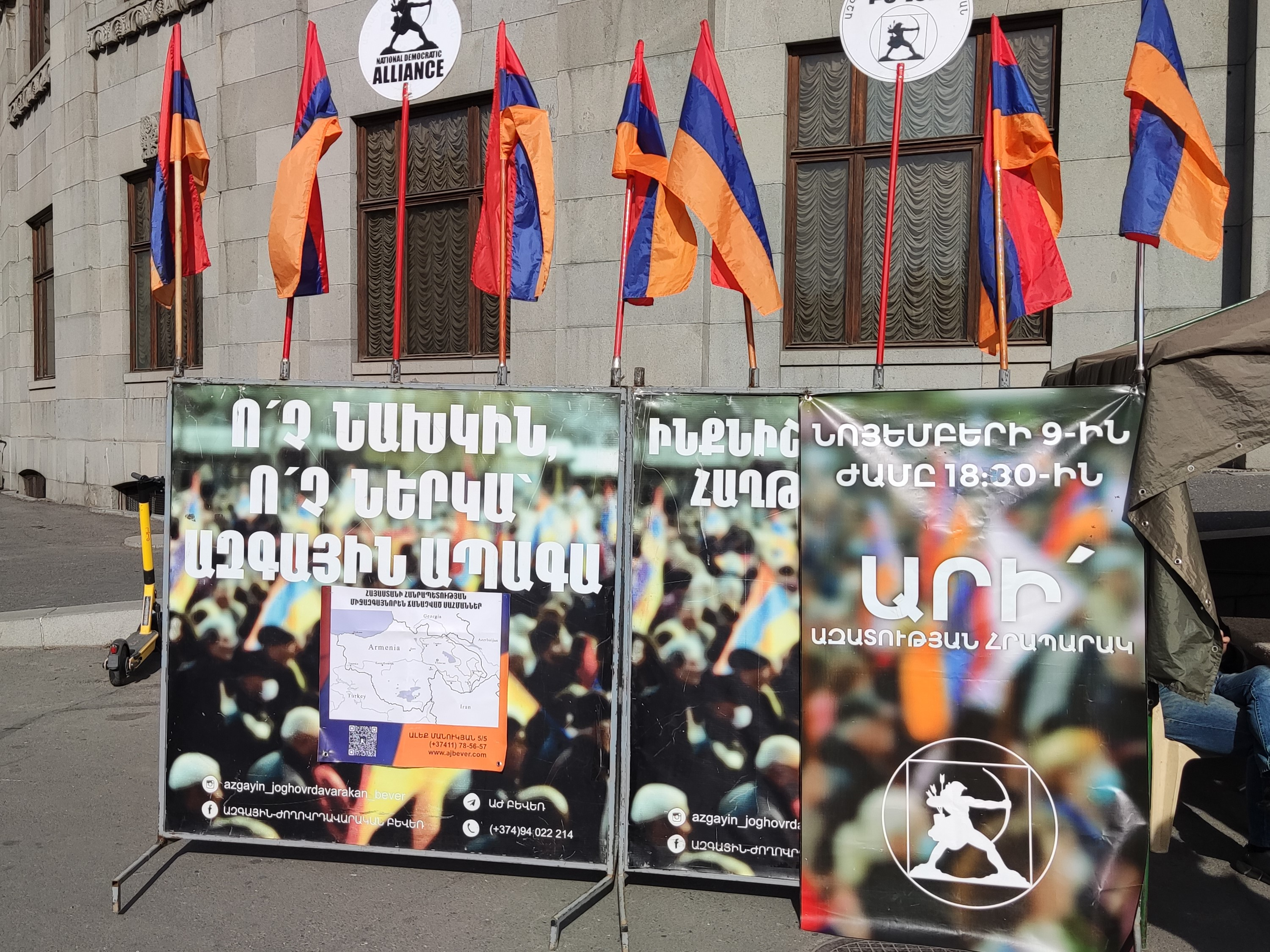
Posters of the nationalist National Democratic Pole party in Freedom Square, Yerevan featuring a map of United Armenia, November 2022.

The Armenian Democratic Liberal Party (ADL, Ramgavar), a diaspora bourgeois conservative party, is also an advocate of Armenian territorial claims to historical territories. In August 1990, Edmond Azadian, a leader of the ADL told the Armenian parliament:

We have always maintained that the territory of this Republic of Armenia is the nucleus of tomorrow's Greater Armenia. In this respect, we expect the newly formed government to commit itself to the restoration of our historic rights. More specifically, the new Republic must include in its on-going agenda the recognition of the Armenian genocide and our historic territorial claims by the international community.

== Territories claimed ==
The modern use of United Armenia by the Armenian Revolutionary Federation (ARF) encompasses the following areas:

Name	Part of	Area	Population	Armenians	% Armenian	Source	Notes
Provinces (Gavarrner)	Armenia	29,743 km^{2} (11,484 sq mi)	3,018,854	2,961,514	98.1	2011	Homeland of Armenians
Nagorno-Karabakh (Artsakh)	Azerbaijan	11,458 km^{2} (4,424 sq mi)	7,000	0	–	–	Armenians of the region ethnically cleansed with Second Nagorno-Karabakh War and 2023 Azerbaijani offensive in Nagorno-Karabakh; Armenians made up 99.7% of population in 2015 (Republic of Artsakh)
Javakheti (Javakhk)	Georgia (Akhalkalaki and Ninotsminda districts)	2,588 km^{2} (999 sq mi)	69,561	65,132	93.6	2014	–
Nakhchivan (Nakhichevan)	Azerbaijan (Nakhchivan Autonomous Republic)	5,363 km^{2} (2,071 sq mi)	398,323	6	~0	2009	Armenians of the region ethnically cleansed in early 20th century; Armenians made up 39.6% of population in 1916 (Nakhichevan uezd)
Eastern Turkey (Western Armenia)	Turkey	132,967 km^{2} (51,339 sq mi)	6,461,400	60,000	0.09	2009	Armenians of the region ethnically cleansed with Hamidian massacres, Adana massacre, Armenian genocide and Turkish War of Independence

=== Nagorno-Karabakh (Artsakh) ===
The territory controlled by the Armenian forces in the Nagorno-Karabakh Republic until 2020 shown in brown

In the aftermath of the First Nagorno-Karabakh War, the Nagorno-Karabakh Republic, supported by the Republic of Armenia, took control over the territory of some 11,500 km^{2}, including several districts outside of the originally claimed borders of the Nagorno-Karabakh Autonomous Oblast of the Azerbaijani SSR, creating a "buffer zone". Kelbajar and Lachin districts guarantee solid land corridor between Armenia proper and Nagorno-Karabakh. Between 500,000 and 600,000 Azerbaijanis were displaced from the area. In the meantime, almost all Armenians from Azerbaijan (between 300,000 and 400,000) and Azerbaijanis from Armenia (over 150,000) were forced to move to their respective countries as remaining in their homes became nearly impossible since tensions between the two groups have grown worse since the start of the conflict in 1988.

The Nagorno-Karabakh Republic or the Republic of Artsakh remained internationally unrecognized. Until 2023, the Republic of Armenia and Artsakh were de facto functioning as one entity, although the Nagorno-Karabakh region was internationally recognized as de jure part of Azerbaijan. Nagorno-Karabakh was more monoethnic than the Republic of Armenia, with 99.7% of its population being Armenian. The Azerbaijani minority was forced to leave during the war. The areas outside the original NKAO borders taken over by the Armenian forces during the war are mostly uninhabited or very sparsely inhabited, with the city of Lachin being an exception. Between 2000 and 2011, 25,000 to 30,000 people settled in NKR.

The 2023 Azerbaijani offensive in Nagorno-Karabakh ended with the defeat and collapse of Artsakh, which formally dissolved on 1 January 2024. It also resulted in the mass expulsion of Nagorno-Karabakh Armenians.

=== Javakheti (Javakhk) ===
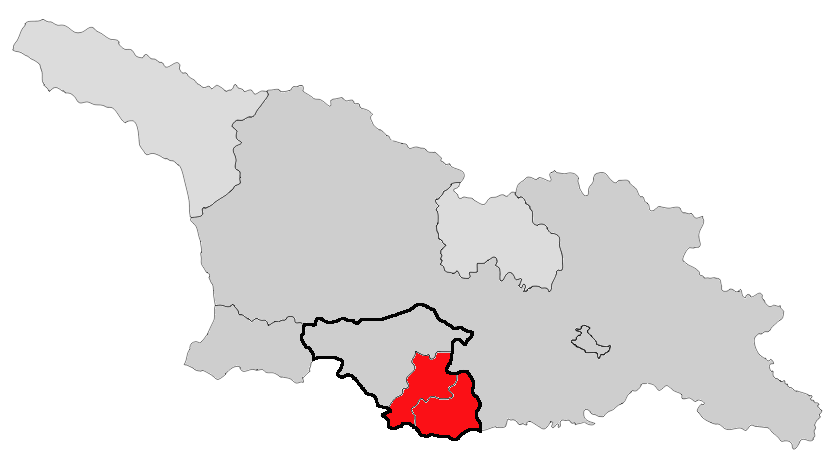
Javakheti (Javakhk) shown in red on the map of Georgia with Samtskhe-Javakheti provincial borders outlined. Abkhazia and South Ossetia, both areas are not under the control of the central government of Georgia, shown in light grey.

The region of Javakheti or Javakhk as known to Armenians comprises the districts of Akhalkalaki and Ninotsminda, both part of Samtskhe-Javakheti region of Georgia. It is overwhelmingly Armenian-populated (around 95%). The area is geographically isolated from the rest of Georgia and remains economically and socially isolated from Georgia. According to Svante Cornell, Javakheti enjoys "wide cultural autonomy" and "certain Georgian analysts observe that the region is in practice as much 'Armenia' as 'Georgia'. It is distinctively easier to get around using Armenian than Georgian in this region; indeed, foreign visitors claim that at first they had difficulties determining which country they are in." Generally, Javakheti Armenians live in "reasonable inter-ethnic harmony" within Georgia, although there is a "fairly strong fear for the future, a sense of insecurity." Javakheti, along with Lori and Borchali, was disputed by Armenia and Georgia from 1918 to 1920. A brief armed conflict took place between the two nations in December 1918, mostly over Lori.

United Javakhk Democratic Alliance, a local civil organization, is the main organization advocating for an Armenian autonomy in the region. It was founded in 1988, during the disintegration of the Soviet Union. It campaigns for a referendum in Javakheti on autonomy. It is believed that the organization has close links with the Armenian Revolutionary Federation. Although the ARF claims Javakheti as part of United Armenia, the ARF World Congresses "have agreed with the demands raised by the Armenians of Javakheti that a Javakheti with a high degree of self-government within a federal Georgia would be able to sustain itself and would become a strong link in Georgian-Armenian relations." ARF Bureau Chairman Hrant Markarian declared in the 2004 party congress: "We want a strong, stable and autonomous Javakheti that is part of Georgia and enjoys state care." The leader of the United Javakhk Democratic Alliance, Vahagn Chakhalian, was arrested in 2008 and freed in 2013. A 2014 article suggested that the alliance has little influence today.

During Zviad Gamsakhurdia's presidency (1991), Javakheti remained de facto semi-independent and only in November 1991 was the Tbilisi-appointed governor able to take power. (Note: "The area remained effectively outside the control of Tbilisi for virtually the entire tenure of Gamsakhurdia.") The issue of Javakheti was in the 1990s "clearly been perceived as the most dangerous potential ethnic conflict in Georgia", however, no actual armed conflict ever occurred. Taking into account the importance of the bilateral relations, the governments of Armenia and Georgia have pursued a careful and calming policy to avoid tension. The Armenian government has not made territorial claims to Georgia, nor has called for an autonomy in Javakheti. Armenia–Georgia relations have traditionally been friendly, however, from time to time tensions arise between the two countries. In recent years, the status of Armenian churches in Georgia and the status of the Armenian language in Georgian public schools had been a matter of dispute. Svante Cornell argues that "Armenia seems to have had a calming influence on Javakhk" as it is highly dependent on Georgia for imports. This viewpoint is shared by Georgian analysts.

Armenian nationalist activist Alexander Yenikomshian has suggested that there are three long-term solutions to the Javakheti issue: 1) the region remains part of a Georgia, where the rights of the Armenian population are protected 2) "Artsakhization", i.e. de facto unification with the Republic of Armenia 3) "Nakhichevanization", i.e. Javakheti loses its Armenian population.

=== Eastern Turkey (Western Armenia) ===
The Turkish area claimed by the ARF (based on the Treaty of Sèvres, 1920)
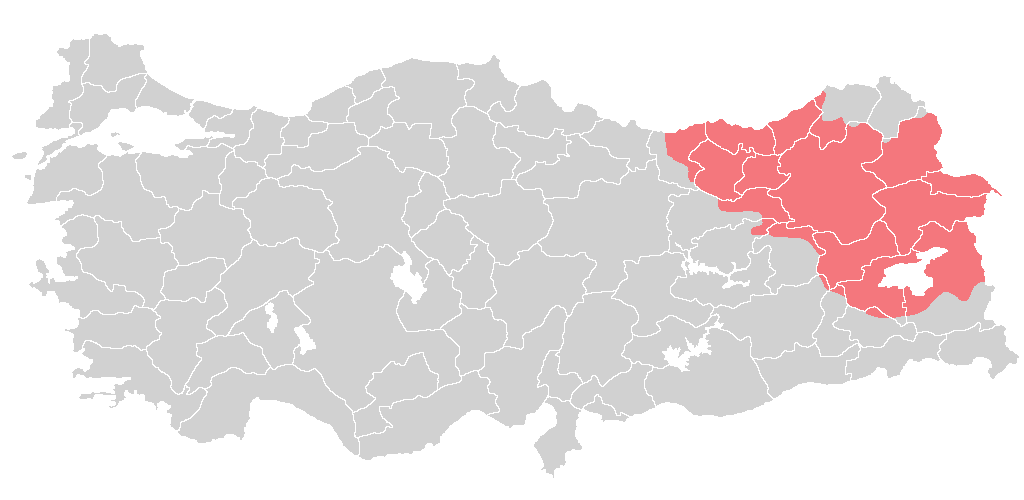

Western Armenia refers to an undefined area, now in eastern Turkey, that had significant Armenian population prior to the Armenian genocide of 1915. As a result of the genocide, officially no Armenians live in the area today. However, at least two distinct groups of Armenian origin reside in the area. Hemshin peoples, an Islamisized group with Armenian ethnic origin, live in the Black Sea coast, particularity in the Rize province. Another group, "Hidden Armenians", live throughout Turkey, especially the eastern parts of the country. Many of them have been assimilated by Kurds. It is impossible to determine how many there are due to the fact that they keep their identity hidden, but estimates range from below 100,000 to millions. Since the Armenian Genocide, the area has been mostly settled by Kurds and Turks, with smaller numbers of Azerbaijanis (near the Turkish-Armenian border) and Georgians and Laz people in the northeastern provinces of Turkey.

Generally, the Armenian nationalist groups claim the area east of the boundary drawn by US President Woodrow Wilson for the Treaty of Sèvres in 1920. The Armenian Revolutionary Federation and groups supporting the concept of United Armenia claim that the Treaty of Sèvres, signed on 10 August 1920 between the Ottoman Empire and the Allies, including Armenia is the only legal document determining the border between Armenia and Turkey. Armenia's Former Deputy Foreign Minister Ara Papian claims that "Wilsonian Armenia," the territory granted to the Republic of Armenia in 1920 by Wilson in the scope of the Treaty of Sèvres, is still de jure part of Armenia today. According to him the Treaty of Kars, which determined the current Turkish-Armenian border, has no legal value because it was signed between two internationally unrecognized subjects: Bolshevik Russia and Kemalist Turkey. Papian has suggested that the Armenian government can file a suit at the International Court of Justice to dispute the border between Armenia and Turkey.

22 November is celebrated by some Armenians as the anniversary of the Arbitral Award. In 2010 and 2011, posters with maps of the Treaty of Sèvres were hung throughout Yerevan.

On 10 August 2020 the three traditional Armenian parties—the Armenian Revolutionary Federation (ARF, Dashnaks), Social Democrat Hunchakian Party (Hunchaks) and the Armenian Democratic Liberal Party (Ramgavars)—issued a joint statement on the centenary of the Sèvres Treaty, stating that the treaty is the only international document defining the border between Armenia and Turkey. "The Treaty of Sevres is a valid international treaty, although it has not been ratified by all signatories, but it has not been legally replaced by any other international instrument. At least from the point of view of the rights of the Armenian Cause, the Republic of Armenia and the Armenian nation, it remains a promissory note based on international law."

==== Official position of Armenia ====
Since Armenia's independence from the Soviet Union in 1991, the Armenian government has not officially made any territorial claims to Turkey. However, the Armenian government has avoided "an explicit and formal recognition of the existing Turkish-Armenian border." In 2001, Armenian president Robert Kocharyan stated that the "genocide recognition will not lead to legal consequences or territorial claims."

In 2010, Armenian President Serzh Sargsyan addressed the Conference Dedicated to the 90th Anniversary of Woodrow Wilson's Arbitral Award:

It was probably one of the most momentous events for our nation in the 20th century which was called up to reestablish historic justice and eliminate consequences of the Armenian Genocide perpetrated in the Ottoman Empire. The Arbitral Award defined and recognized internationally Armenia's borders within which the Armenian people, who had gone through hell of Mets Eghern, were to build their statehood.

On 23 July 2011, during a meeting of Armenian President Serzh Sargsyan with students in Tsaghkadzor resort city, a student asked Sargsyan if Turkey "will return Western Armenia" in the future. Sargsyan responded:

It depends on you and your generation. I believe, my generation has fulfilled the task in front of us; when it was necessary in the beginning of the 1990s to defend part of our fatherland—Karabakh—from the enemy, we did it. I am not telling this to embarrass anyone: my point is that each generation has its responsibilities and they have to be carried out, with honor. If you, boys and girls of your generation spare no effort, if those older and younger than you act the same way, we will have one of the best countries in the world. Trust me, in many cases the country's standing is not conditioned by its territory: the country should be modern, it should be secure and prosperous, and these are conditions which allow any nation to sit next to the respectable, powerful and reputed nations of the world. We simply must fulfill our duty, must be active, industrious, must be able to create bounty. And we can do that, we very easily can do that, and we have done it more than once in our history. I am certain about it, and I want you to be certain too. We are a nation that always rises from the ashes like phoenix—again and again.

Sargsyan's statements "were considered by Turkish officials an encouragement for young students to fulfill the task of their generation and occupy eastern Turkey." During his visit to Baku a few days later, Turkish Prime Minister Recep Tayyip Erdoğan denounced Sargsyan's statements and described them as "provocation" and claimed that Sargsyan this "told young Armenians to be ready for a future war with Turkey." Erdoğan demanded apology from Sargsyan calling his statements a "blunder". In response, Armenian Deputy Foreign Minister Shavarsh Kocharyan stated that Sargsyan's words were "interpreted out of context."

On 5 July 2013, during a forum of Armenian lawyers in Yerevan on the 100th Anniversary of the Armenian Genocide organized by the Ministry of Diaspora, Armenia's Prosecutor General Aghvan Hovsepyan made a "sensational statement". Hovsepyan particularly stated:

Indeed, the Republic of Armenia should have its lost territories returned and the victims of the Armenian Genocide should receive material compensation. But all these claims must have perfect legal grounds. I strongly believe that the descendants of the genocide must receive material compensation, churches miraculously preserved in Turkey's territory and church lands must be returned to the Armenian Church, and the Republic of Armenia must get back its lost lands.

According to ArmeniaNow news agency "this was seen as the first territorial claim of Armenia to Turkey made on an official level. The prosecutor general is the carrier of the highest legal authority in the country, and his statement is equivalent to an official statement." In response, the Turkish Ministry of Foreign Affairs released a statement on 12 July 2013 denouncing Hovsepyan's statements. According to the Turkish side his statements reflect the "prevailing problematic mentality in Armenia as to the territorial integrity of its neighbor Turkey." The statement said that "one should be well aware that no one can presume to claim land from Turkey."

On 10 August 2020 Prime Minister Nikol Pashinyan, President Armen Sarkissian and parliament speaker Ararat Mirzoyan issued statements on the centenary of the Sèvres Treaty. Pashinyan noted that although it was never implemented, "it continues to be a historical fact, which reflects our long journey to restore our independent statehood. We are bound by duty to remember it, realize its importance and follow its message." Sarkissian stated that the treaty "even today remains an essential document for the right of the Armenian people to achieve a fair resolution of the Armenian issue." Mirzoyan called the treaty an expression of "dreamy naivety."

=== Nakhchivan ===
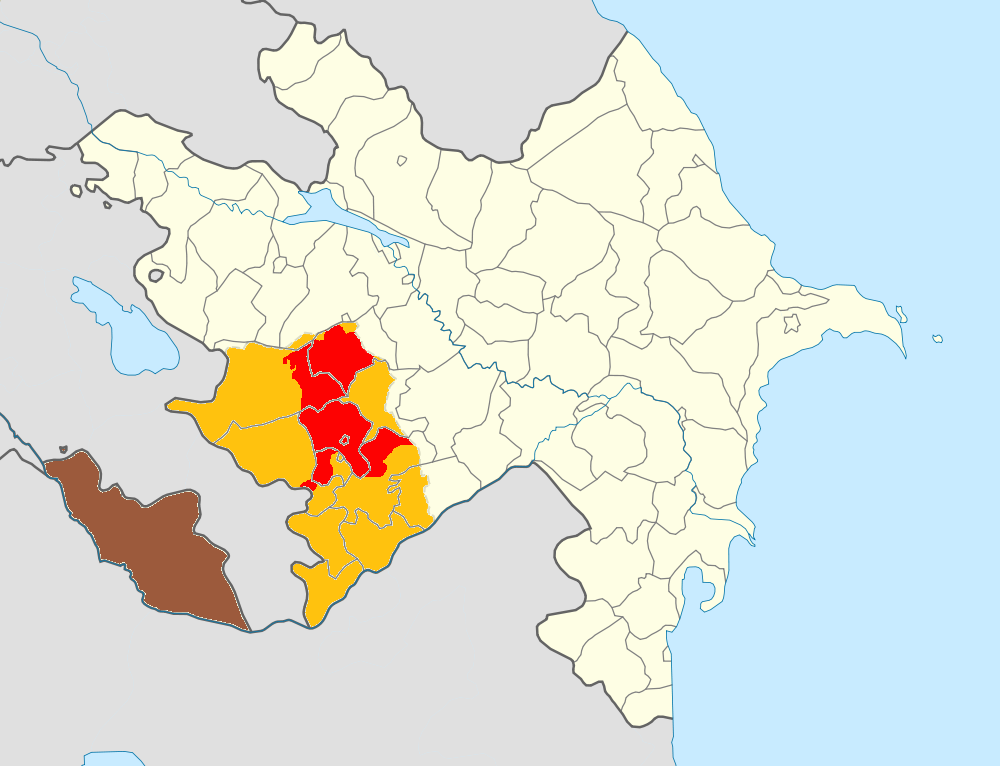
Nakhichevan shown in brown. The area formerly held by the dissolved Nagorno-Karabakh Republic until 2020 Nagorno-Karabakh war and 2023 offensive in Nagorno-Karabakh shown in yellow and red respectively.

Up until the Great Surgun (1604) and Azerbaijan's ethnic cleansing policies in the 20th century, Armenians had comprised a significant demographic group in the region. Armenian tradition says that Nakhichevan (Նախիջևան Naxidjevan in Armenian and Naxçıvan in Azerbaijani) was founded by Noah. Armenians have been living in Nakhichevan since ancient times. It was one of gavars of Vaspurakan province of the Kingdom of Armenia. In 189 BC, Nakhchivan became part of the new Kingdom of Armenia established by Artaxias I. Within the kingdom, the region of present-day Nakhichevan was part of the Ayrarat, Vaspurakan and Syunik provinces.

By the 16th century, control of Nakhichevan passed to the Safavid dynasty of Persia. Because of its geographic position, it frequently suffered during the earlier wars between Persia and the Ottoman Empire in the 14th to 18th centuries. In 1604–1605, Shah Abbas I, concerned that the lands of Nakhichevan and the surrounding areas could potentially pass into Ottoman hands, decided to institute a scorched earth policy. In what is called the Great Surgun, he forced 300,000 Armenians, including those from Nakhichevan to leave their homes and move to the Persian provinces south of the Aras River. After the last 1826-1828 Russo-Persian War, Nakhichevan became part of Russia per the Treaty of Turkmenchay after Persia's forced ceding. Alexandr Griboyedov, the Russian envoy to Persia, reported that 1,228 Armenian families from Persia migrated to Nakhichevan, while prior to their migration there were 2,024 Muslim and 404 Armenian families living in the province.

According to the 1897 Russian Empire census, the Nakhichevan uyezd of the Erivan Governorate had a population of 100,771, of which 34,672 were Armenian (34.4%), while Caucasian Tatars (Azerbaijanis) numbered 64,151 or 63.7% of the total population. The proportion of Armenian was around 40% prior to World War I. Nakhichevan was disputed between Armenia and Azerbaijan from 1918 to 1920 during the countries' brief independence. Due to the Ottoman invasion in 1918, 100,000 Armenians fled from Nakhichevan. By June 1919, after the British troops left the area, Armenia succeeded in establishing control over Nakhichevan. Some of the Nakhichevan Armenians returned to their homes in summer 1919. Again, more violence erupted in 1919 leaving some 10,000 Armenians dead and some 45 Armenian villages destroyed.

After the Soviet takeover of the Caucasus region in 1920 and 1921, the Treaty of Moscow, also known as the Treaty of Brotherhood, was signed between the Government of the Grand National Assembly and Soviet Russia on 16 March 1921. According to this treaty Nakhichevan became "an autonomous territory under the auspices of Azerbaijan, under the condition that Azerbaijan will not relinquish the protectorate to any third party." The Treaty of Kars was signed between the Grand National Assembly and Armenian SSR, Azerbaijan SSR, Georgian SSR on 13 October 1921. The treaty reaffirmed that the "Turkish Government and the Soviet Governments of Armenia and Azerbaijan are agreed that the region of Nakhichevan ... constitutes an autonomous territory under the protection of Azerbaijan." By the mid-1920s, the number of Armenians in Nakhichevan dwindled significantly and according to the 1926 Soviet census the 11,276 Armenians made up only 10.7% of the autonomous republic. During the Soviet period, the Armenians of Nakhichevan felt "pressured to leave" According to the Soviet census of 1979, only 3,406 Armenians resided in Nakhichevan or 1.4% of the total population. The last few thousand Armenians left Nakhichevan in 1988 amid the Nagorno-Karabakh conflict.

In August 1987, the Armenian National Academy of Sciences started a petition to transfer Nakhichevan and Nagorno-Karabakh under jurisdiction of Armenia. In the nationalist movement to unite Nagorno-Karabakh with Armenia, Armenians "used the example of the slow "de-Armenianization" of Nakhichevan in the course of the twentieth century as an example of what they feared would happen to them." During the First Nagorno-Karabakh War, clashes occurred between Armenian and Azeri forces in the Nakhichevan-Armenia border, however, the war did not spill over into Nakhichevan. Turkey, Azerbaijan's close ally, threatened to intervene if Armenia invaded Nakhichevan. Nakhichevan was in center of attention during the destruction of the Armenian cemetery in Julfa in the 2000s. According to the Research on Armenian Architecture, most of the Armenian churches, monasteries and cemeteries were destroyed by Azerbaijan in the 1990s.

The Armenian government has never made any claims to Nakhichevan, although there have been calls by nationalist circles (including Hayazn, Heritage youth wing and prominent First Nagorno-Karabakh War veteran Jirair Sefilian) to forcibly annex Nakhichevan in case Azerbaijan attacks Nagorno-Karabakh. Rəfael Hüseynov, the director of the Nizami Museum of Azerbaijani Literature, in his written question to the Committee of Ministers of the Council of Europe in 2007 claimed that the "seizure Nakhichevan is one of the main military goals of Armenia." Writing in the Harvard International Review in 2011 US-based Azerbaijani historian Alec Rasizade suggested that "Armenian ideologues have lately started to talk about the return of Nakhichevan."

=== "Kura-Arax Republic" ===
A potential military advancement toward central Azerbaijan, especially up to the Kura river, has become part of the Armenian political discourse in the Nagorno-Karabakh conflict. A maximalist and expansionist option, advancing up to the Kura river is seen by analysts and military figures as a method of forcing Azerbaijan to surrender and give up its claims to Karabakh. For others, it is a realistic policy which should be persuaded by the government of Armenia to take control of territories that are, according to its advocates, historical or natural part of Armenia.

The phrase "Kura-Arax Republic" was coined in 2016 by Levon Shirinyan, a political science professor and a former member of the ARF, to advocate Armenian military advancement into the territory of Azerbaijan west of the Kura river (including Nakhichevan) to achieve complete surrender of Azerbaijan. Following the April 2016 war in Karabakh with Azerbaijan, he stated that Armenia should "transfer the military operations" into Yevlakh and the confluence of the rivers Kura and Arax (Aras or Araxes). The explained the importance of the two as follows: Yevlakh is a major hub of the Baku-Tbilisi railway and the oil and gas pipelines, while the second would give Armenia an opportunity to assist the Talysh in reviving an independent state in the south of Azerbaijan. He argues that Armenia cannot have peace "unless we get to Kura-Araks" and "destroy Azerbaijan as a Turkic state." Shirinyan set up the Christian-Democratic Rebirth Party prior to the 2018 parliamentary election, which proclaimed "Kura-Araxian Armenia" as one of its main objectives.

The idea was adopted by the hard-line nationalist group led by Jirair Sefilian that took over a police base in Yerevan in July 2016. Varuzhan Avetisyan, leader of the armed group, explicitly supported the idea from prison in 2017. Sefilian did so in April 2018. Following their release from prison after the 2018 Armenian Velvet Revolution, members of the armed group formed the Sasna Tsrer Pan-Armenian Party, which officially adopted "Kura-Arax Republic" as one of its objectives. Their party program stated Nakhichevan and the areas of Azerbaijan west of the Kura should become part of Armenia and, thus, establish the Kura-Araxian Republic. Sefilian stated:

The goal should be to include in the Armenian state at least Nakhichevan, other territories of the artificial state of Azerbaijan to the right bank of the Kura. With the creation on the official territory of today's Armenia and Artsakh of the New Republic, the process of the collapse of the Russian-Turkish regional architecture will begin, which will be accompanied by the formation of the regional architecture consistent with the interests of Armenia. Staying within the existing territories, we will have to allocate for elementary survival much more of the resources we need so much for development. In other words, the attitude to the project of the Kura-Arax Republic proceeds from a very, very pragmatic issue. Whether we want or do not want to find our place, a free, dignified life under the sun, to have a future, a real hope for the re-acquisition of our entire homeland and the return of home Armenians.

== Public opinion ==
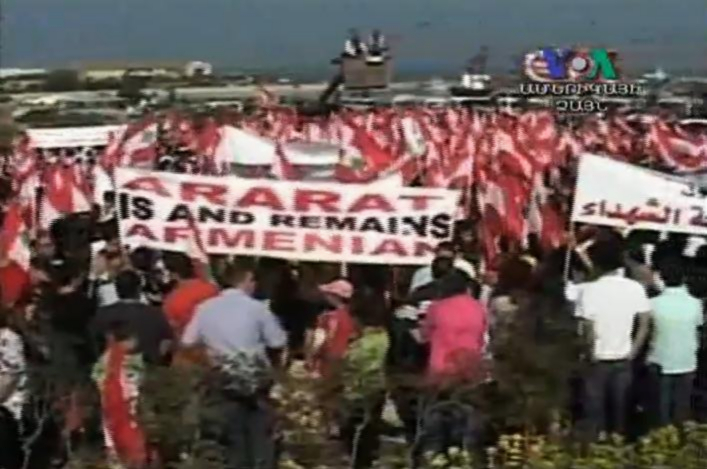
Lebanese Armenians holding a poster during Turkish Prime Minister Erdoğan's visit to Beirut in November 2010. The text reads "[Mount] Ararat is and remains Armenian".

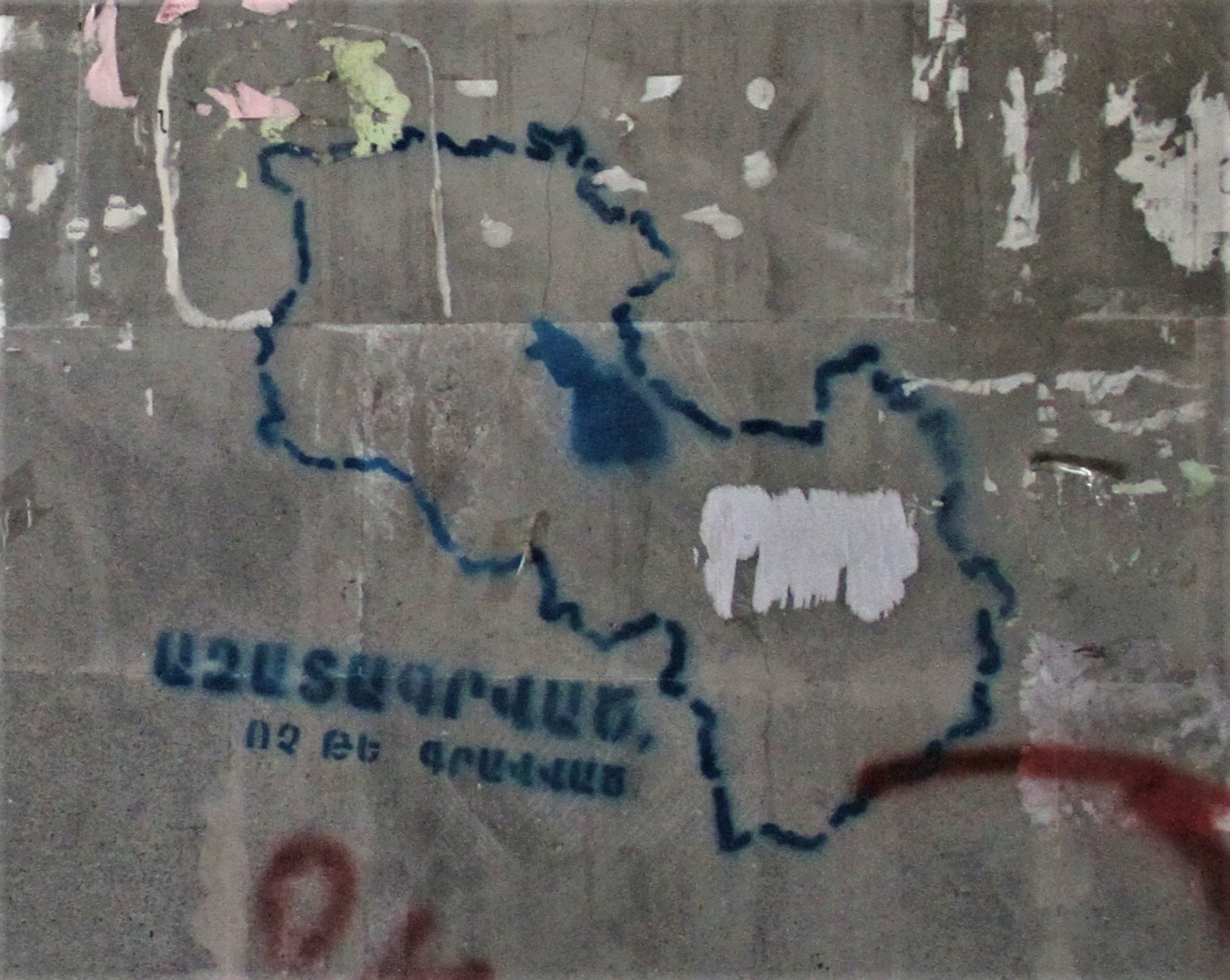
A graffiti in Yerevan of the map outline of Armenia and Nagorno-Karabakh. The text reads "Liberated, not occupied."

There are no public opinion data concerning the United Armenia concept, however, it is popular among Armenians according to Hürriyet Daily News. Moshe Gammer of the Tel Aviv University and Emil Souleimanov of the Charles University in Prague both suggest that the concept is popular in the Armenian diaspora. Gerard Libaridian wrote in 2007:

While it is true that not all Armenians in the Diaspora share the vision of a united Armenia as a political program, territorial aspirations were sustained, nonetheless, by the deep sense of injustice that Armenians generally felt [by the Turkish denial of the genocide and lack of any kind of compensation for the genocide losses].

A 2014 survey in Armenia asked what kind of demands should Armenia make to Turkey. Some 80% agreed that Armenia should make territorial claims (30% said only territorial claims, while another 50% said territorial, moral, financial, and proprietary). Only 5.5% said no demands should be made. According to a 2012 survey, 36% of Armenians asked agree or somewhat agree that Turkish recognition of the Armenian Genocide will result in territorial compensation, while 45% believe it will not. The online publication Barometer.am wrote: "It appears that our pragmatic population believes that all possible demands should be forwarded to Turkey [...] but a relative majority consider the practival realization of territorial claims to Turkey is unrealistic."

=== On Artsakh ===
One Istanbul-based researcher wrote in the Jacobin magazine in 2016 that "[f]ew in Armenia support [the] pleas to use Karabakh as a springboard to recreate 'Greater Armenia.' But the idea that Karabakh must be held no matter the cost is widespread." According to a 2017 survey in Armenia 86.4% of respondents opposed any territorial concessions in the Karabakh conflict, while 8.2% accepted concessions for the sake of settlement.

According to a 2013 Caucasus Barometer survey, when asked about having Nagorno-Karabakh as a formal part of Armenia, 77% of respondents "definitely favor" such a status, 13% would be "accepting under certain circumstances", and 7% oppose it.

== In culture ==
The concept of creating a united state that would include all Armenian-populated areas has been the main theme of the Armenian revolutionary songs. Nersik Ispiryan and Harout Pamboukjian are among the most famous performers of such songs. One of the most widely known examples of these songs is "We must go" (Պիտի գնանք, Piti gnank) by gusan Haykazun written in 1989:

Ախ էն երկրի հողին մատաղ, պիտի՛ գնանք վաղ թե ուշ, Սիրով լինի, սրով լինի, պիտի՛ գնանք վաղ թե ուշ, Արարատի գլխին դրոշ պիտի՛ դնենք վաղ թե ուշ, Հերթով լինի, երթով լինի, պիտի՛ գնանք վաղ թե ուշ: Թեկուզ անանց պարիսպներով մեզ բաժանեն մեր երկրից, Հրով լինի, սրով լինի, պիտի՛ գնանք վաղ թե ուշ:	Oh, God bless that country, that we must go to sooner or later, With love it will be or with sword, we must go sooner or later, We must put a flag on Ararat sooner or later, With line it will be or with march, we must go sooner or later. Even if impassable fences separate us from our country, With fire it will be or sword, we must go sooner or later.

The map of Armenia as seen in 2005 animated film Road home.

From 2005 to 2008, four short animated cartoons were released by the National Cinema Center of Armenia called Road home (Ճանապարհ դեպի տուն) produced by Armenian animator Robert Sahakyants. It tells a story of a group of school children from Karin (Erzurum) in 2050 taking a trip throughout the "liberated from enemy" territories: Tigranakert, Baghesh (Bitlis), Mush and Akdamar Island. The country they live in is called Hayk' (Հայք) after the historical name of Armenia. The series was aired by the Public Television of Armenia. In one of his last interviews, Sahakyants stated: "If today I'm shooting a film about how we are going to return Western Armenia, then I'm convinced that it will definitely take place."

== Reactions ==
=== In Armenia ===
Leading Armenian communist Anastas Mikoyan stated in 1919 that "Armenian chauvinists relying on the allies of imperialism push forward a criminal idea—the creation of a 'Great Armenia' on the borders of Historic Armenia. The absence of Armenians and the presence of an absolute Muslim population there does not concern them... our party cannot support the idea of either a 'Great' or 'Small' Turkish Armenia."

Armenia's first president Levon Ter-Petrosyan (1991–98), in a widely publicized 1997 essay on the Nagorno-Karabakh conflict titled "War or Peace? Time to Get Serious", argued that if Armenia was to officially demand "the return of Armenian lands" from Turkey and cancellation of the Treaty of Kars, it would only play into the hands of Turkey. He argued that it would "provide Turkey with more evidence of Armenia's expansionist ambitions" and direct more negative international opinion towards Armenia. Petrosyan has called the idea of "Kura-Arax republic" a "fairy tale."

Gerard Libaridian, a former adviser to President Ter-Petrosyan, criticized August 2020 statements by Prime Minister Nikol Pashinyan and President Armen Sarkissian on the 100th anniversary of the Sèvres Treaty as being "equivalent to a declaration of at least diplomatic war against Turkey." According to Libaridian, "Adopting the Treaty of Sevres as an instrument of foreign policy Armenia placed the demand of territories from Turkey on its agenda."

=== In Azerbaijan ===
Azerbaijani President Heydar Aliyev in 1998 stated in his "Decree of President of Republic of Azerbaijan about genocide of Azerbaijani people" that the "artificial territorial division in essence created the preconditions for implementing the policy of expelling Azerbaijanis from their lands and annihilating them. The concept of 'greater Armenia' began to be propagated."

In 2012, President of Azerbaijan and son of Heydar Aliyev, Ilham Aliyev, who has made several statements toward Armenia and Armenians in past such as "our main enemies are Armenians of the world", stated that "Over the past two centuries, Armenian bigots, in an effort to materialize their 'Great Armenia' obsession at the expense of historically Azerbaijani lands, have repeatedly committed crimes against humanity such as terrorism, mass extermination, deportation and ethnic cleansing of our people."

=== In Turkey ===
Some Turkish sources have speculated that the coat of arms of Armenia, which features Mount Ararat, currently located in Turkey, is part of the Armenian claims.

In December 1991, Turkey became one of the first countries to recognize the independence of Armenia from the Soviet Union. Armenia–Turkey relations deteriorated during the First Nagorno-Karabakh War, during which Turkey aligned itself with Azerbaijan. Turkey shares its Turkic heritage with Azerbaijan and the two countries are generally seen as allies in the region. The expression "one nation, two states" has been often used to describe the relations of the two countries.

In Turkey, "many believe that Armenia's territorial claims are the main reason why the Armenian administration and lobbyists are pushing for global recognition" of the Armenian Genocide. The Turkish Ministry of Culture and Tourism credits the idea of "Great Armenia" to Armenian President Levon Ter-Petrosyan. According to Prof. İdris Bal "Turkey considers Armenian policy (and the activities of its powerful diaspora groups) since 1989 to be against its national security interests and territorial integrity. Armenia's failure to recognize the Kars Agreement, along with the frequent public references to eastern Turkey as 'Western Armenia,' provides a serious irritant to Turkey. The Turkish Mount Ararat is pictured in the official Armenian state emblem, which Turkey interprets as a sign that the 'greater Armenia' vision is still very much alive."

According to Hürriyet Daily News some "foreign policy experts draw attention to the fact that Armenia has territorial claims over Turkey, citing certain phrases in the Armenian Constitution and Declaration of Independence." The Armenia Declaration of Independence was passed on 23 August 1990 officially declaring "the beginning of the process of establishing of independent statehood positioning the question of the creation of a democratic society." It was signed by Levon Ter-Petrosyan, the President of the Supreme Council, who became the first President of Armenia in 1991. Article 11 of the declaration read:

"The Republic of Armenia stands in support of the task of achieving international recognition of the 1915 Genocide in Ottoman Turkey and Western Armenia."

Turkish historian and political scientist Umut Uzer characterized Armenian territorials claims to eastern Turkey as "a racist and irredentist demand with regard to a territory which has never in history had an Armenian majority population. And these demands are buttressed with genocide claims which in fact deny the very existence of Turkey in its current borders."

== See also ==
- Armenia–Turkey border
- Armenian highlands
- Armenian national movement
- Armenian nationalism
- Armenian question
- Armenian Secret Army for the Liberation of Armenia
- Foreign relations of Armenia
- Miatsum
- National Revival (Artsakh) in Artsakh
- Provinces of the kingdom of Armenia (antiquity)
- Repatriation of Armenians
- Six Vilayets
- Western Armenia

Other irredentist concepts (Western Asia)

- Greater Israel
- Greater Kurdistan
- Megali Idea
- Pan-Iranism
- Pan-Turkism
- Whole Azerbaijan
- Wilsonian Armenia
