= Sasna Tsrer Pan-Armenian Party =

Armenian nationalist political party

Sasna Tsrer Pan-Armenian Party Սասնա Ծռեր համահայկական կուսակցություն
- Leader: Varuzhan Avetisyan
- Spokesperson: Vahagn Avagyan
- Founded: September 29, 2018
- Headquarters: Yerevan
- Ideology: Armenian nationalism National conservatism Anti-Russian sentiment Anti-EAEU; Anti-CSTO; Pro-Europeanism; Atlanticism; United Armenia
- Political position: Right-wing
- National affiliation: National Democratic Pole
- Slogan: "It's Time"
- National Assembly: 0 / 107

Website
- sasnatsrer.org

Original logo of the organization

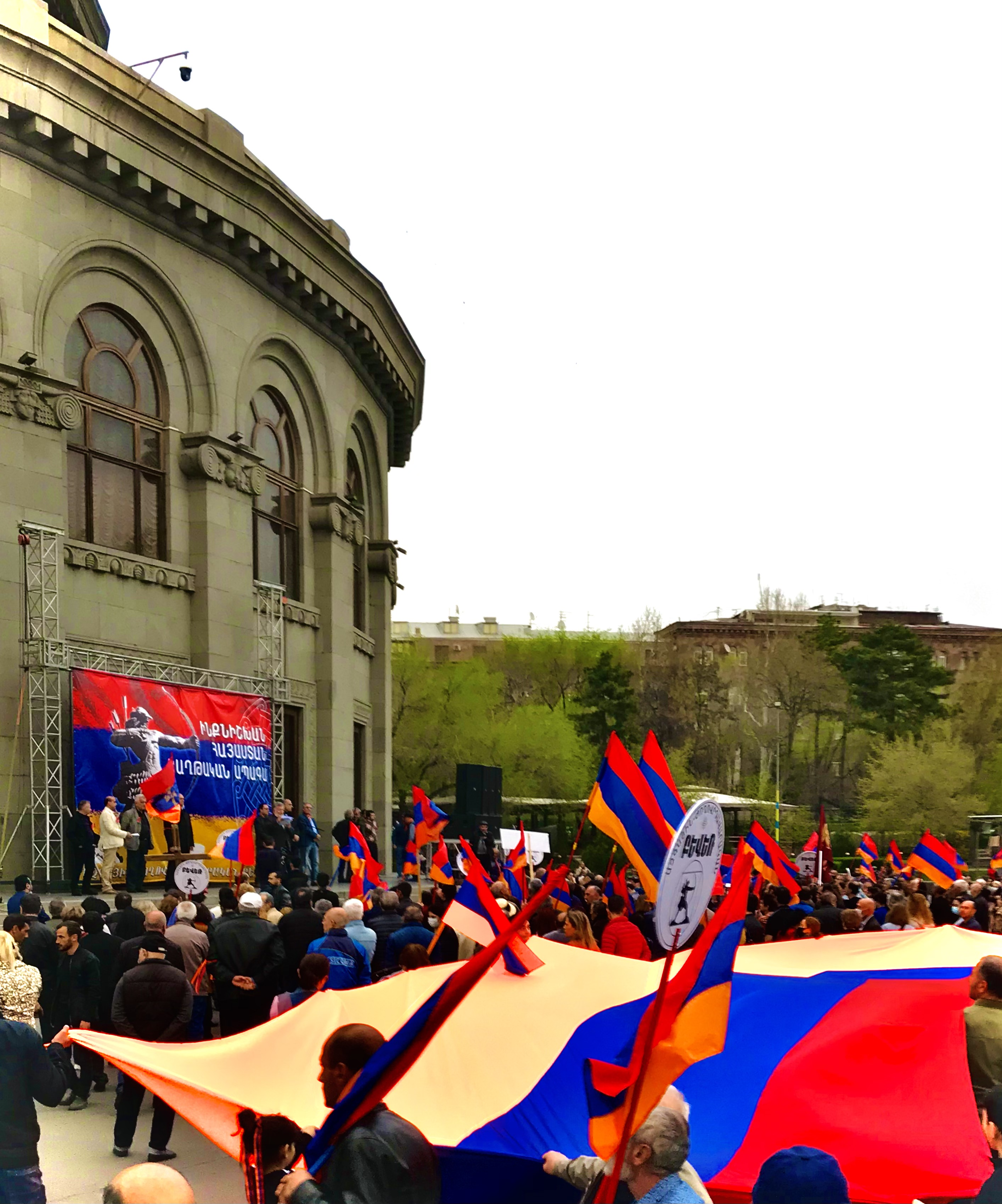
A protest in Freedom square organized by the National Democratic Pole.

Sasna Tsrer Pan-Armenian Party (Armenian: Սասնա Ծռեր համահայկական կուսակցություն, romanized: Sasna Tsřer hamahaykakan kusaktsutyun) is an Armenian national conservative political party that was founded in September 2018 in the wake of the country's Velvet Revolution.

== Name ==
The party's name is taken from an Armenian heroic epic poem Daredevils of Sassoun (Sasna Tsrer in Armenian).

== Organization ==
The party is led by a seven-member secretariat: Garegin Chugaszyan, Alexander Yenikomshian, Gevorg Safaryan, Vahagn Avagyan, Arek Kyureghyan, Ruzan Yeghnukyan and Varuzhan Avetisyan.

== History ==
Sasna Tsrer was previously a radical opposition to the pro-Russian rule of Serzh Sargsyan and his Republican Party of Armenia, whose activities culminated in the 2016 Yerevan hostage crisis. The party later renounced violence. Jirair Sefilian, a veteran of the First Nagorno-Karabakh War, is one of the party's key figures.

Sasna Tsrer participated in the 2018 parliamentary elections, but received only 1.82% of the votes. As this was lower than the 5% minimum threshold required, the party failed to gain any representation in the National Assembly. Despite not gaining any seats, the party has remained active in Armenian politics and currently acts as an extra-parliamentary force. Following the 2018 elections, the party initially supported newly elected Prime Minister Nikol Pashinyan and endorsed Pashinyan's new government; Sefilian had stated that he had a constructive relationship with Pashinyan. However, the party eventually became dissatisfied with Pashinyan and his performance. Sasna Tsrer voiced support for the creation of an alliance of Pro-Western political forces, namely with the European Party of Armenia. Tigran Khzmalyan, leader of the European Party of Armenia also headed the call by stating, "We are in a situation where radical opposition and democratic forces must unite and demand a strategy of joining Armenia with Western powers." In May 2020, Jirair Sefilian signed a declaration along with two-dozen other political figures calling on the Pashinyan government to hold snap parliamentary elections. The party subsequently joined the National Democratic Pole alliance.

In November 2020, the Sasna Tsrer Pan-Armenian Party held a rally in central Yerevan, along with the Union for National Self-Determination and the European Party of Armenia. The three parties called for the creation of a truly sovereign Armenia by ending Russian political occupation and avoiding clinging to Russia, while aligning closer with Europe.

The party has also announced its intentions to set up a sister party in the Republic of Artsakh.

On 18 May 2021, the party confirmed that they would participate in the 2021 Armenian parliamentary elections as part of the National Democratic Pole, with Vahe Gasparyan leading the alliance. Following the election, the alliance won 1.49% of the popular vote, failing to win any seats in the National Assembly.

== Ideology ==
At times, Sasna Tsrer has been portrayed as extreme nationalists. De facto party leader Jirair Sefilyan supports the creation of a United Armenia. They explicitly call for unification of the Republic of Artsakh (Nagorno-Karabakh) with Armenia. Sasna Tser staunchly opposed Armenia's former ruling party, the Republican Party. The strategic goal of the party is to unite Armenians in Armenia and abroad, ensure the sustainability of the Armenian nation and its global influence.

The party's foreign policy is strongly anti-Russian, with its manifesto calling for the "liberation of Armenia from Russian colonial rule" and the withdrawal from Russian-led organizations including the Eurasian Economic Union, the Collective Security Treaty Organisation and the CIS. The party calls for the immediate withdrawal of Russian soldiers from Armenia and the closure of the Russian 102nd Military Base in Gyumri. Despite the party's anti-Russian views, the party is also opposed of Armenia joining NATO.

The party advocates for establishing strategic alliances with the United States and Iran and building closer cooperation with the European Union, Ukraine, Georgia, China and India.

== Electoral record ==
=== Parliamentary elections ===
Election	Leader	Votes	%	Seats	+/–	Position	Government
2018	Varuzhan Avetisyan	22,868	1.82	0 / 132	0	▲7th	Extra-parliamentary
2021 (Note: As part of National Democratic Pole)	Varuzhan Avetisyan	18,976	1.49	0 / 107	0	▼8th	Extra-parliamentary

== See also ==
- Programs of political parties in Armenia
