= Jirair Sefilian =

Lebanese-born Armenian military commander and activist

- Ժիրայր Սէֆիլեան
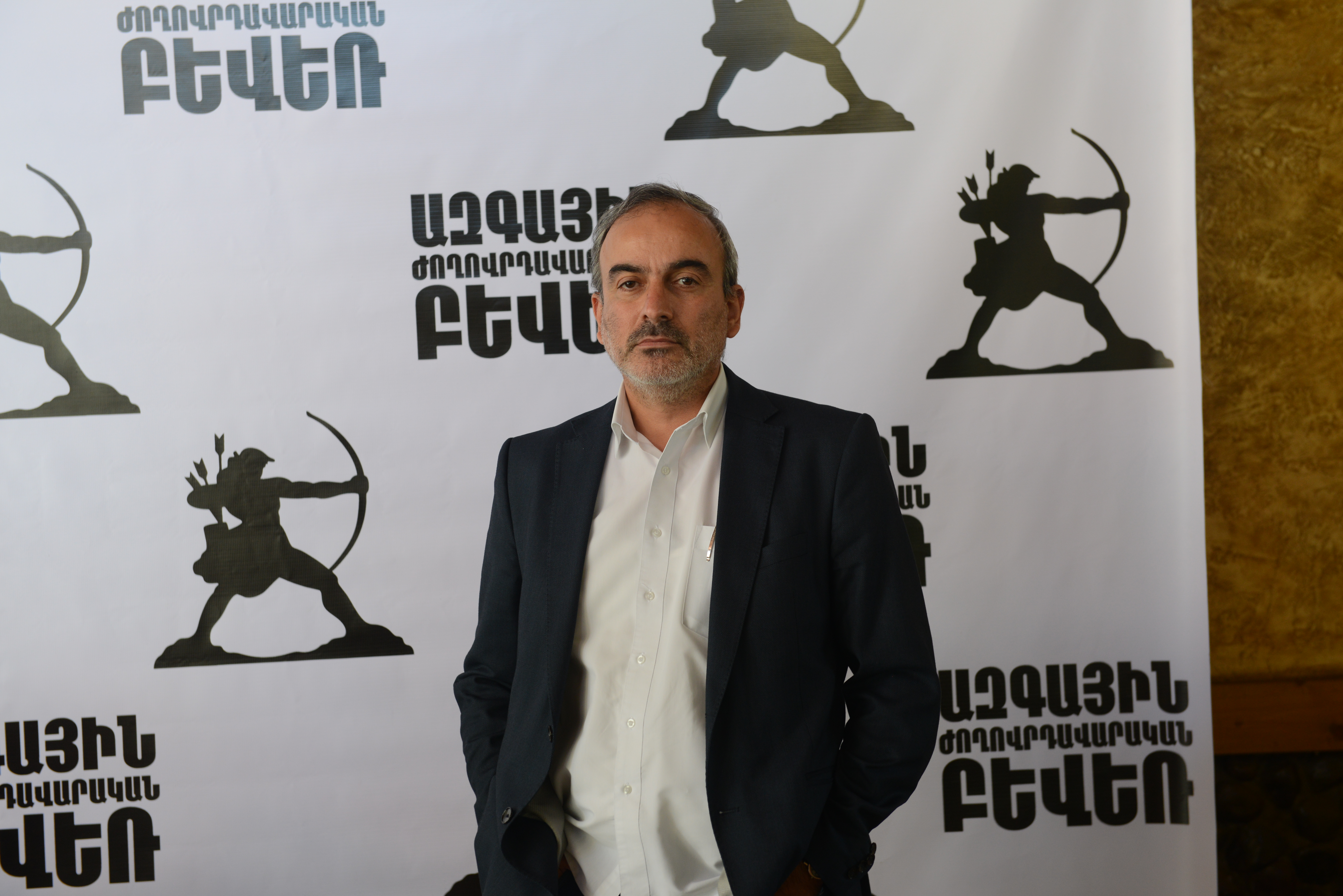
- Sefilian in 2020
- Born: 10 July 1967 (age 59); Beirut, Lebanon
- Military career
- Allegiance: Armenia; Republic of Artsakh
- Branch: Armed Forces of Armenia
- Service years: 1983–1998
- Rank: Lieutenant colonel
- Commands: Shushi Military Company; NKR Defense Army Brigade
- Conflicts: Lebanese Civil War; Defense of Bourj Hammoud; First Nagorno-Karabakh War; Capture of Shusha; Capture of Aghdam; Battle of Kalbajar; Mardakert and Martuni Offensives
- Awards: Order of the Combat Cross (1st degree)

Jirair Simoni Sefilian (Armenian: Ժիրայր Սիմոնի Սէֆիլեան (classical), Ժիրայր Սիմոնի Սեֆիլյան (reformed); born July 10, 1967) is a Lebanese-born Armenian military commander and political activist. During the First Nagorno-Karabakh War, he commanded the Shushi special military battalion, playing a significant role during the Battle of Shusha. From 1997 to 1998 Sefilian was a Brigade Commander in the Artsakh Defence Army.

He has long campaigned against any territorial concessions to Azerbaijan in Nagorno-Karabakh and against Russian influence in Armenia. Sefilian is one of the key figures of the Sasna Tsrer Pan-Armenian Party and the National Democratic Pole.

== Early and personal life ==
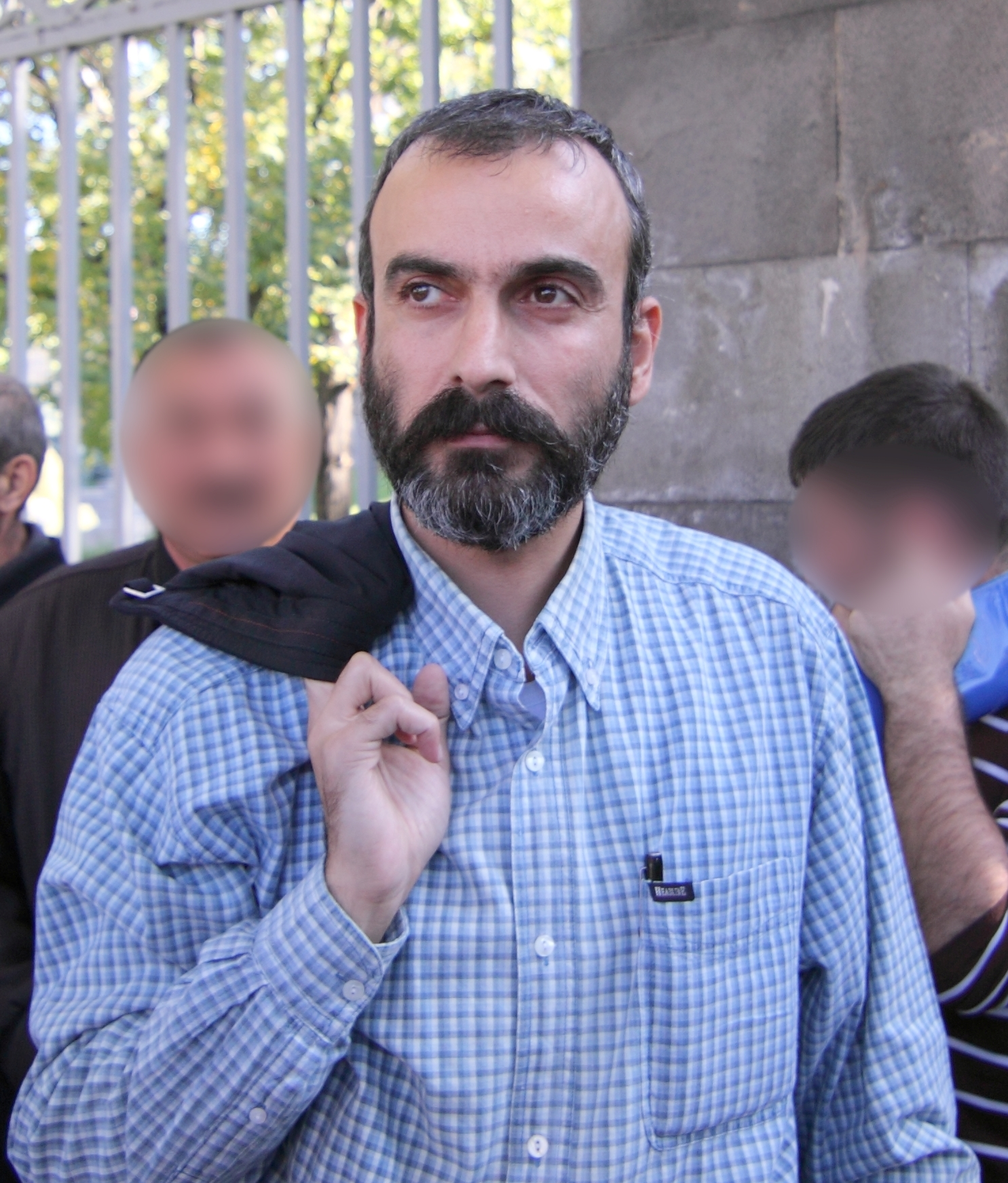
Sefilian in Yerevan, 2009

Sefilian graduated from Kevork Chatalbashian College in Beirut in 1986. During the Lebanese Civil War, he took part in the defense of the Armenian Quarters of Beirut (mainly Bourj Hammoud) from 1983 to 1990.

In 1990, with the purpose of participating in the Karabakh movement he was sent to Armenia by the ARF (Dashnaktsutyun), Sefilian moved to Armenia with his family. As a military instructor, he was involved in the formation of self-defense units in Karabakh and Syunik. In 1991, as a commander of a military detachment, Sefilian took part in the defense of several districts of Nagorno-Karabakh. In 1992 he was chosen by the ARF to be the commander of the Shushi special military company, playing a significant role during the Battle of Shusha. He also participated in other battles, including the Capture of Aghdam, the Battle of Kalbajar, and the Mardakert and Martuni Offensives.

Following the First Nagorno-Karabakh War, Sefilian returned to Lebanon and was unable to return until 1997 due to the ban on the ARF at the time. From 1997 to 1998 he was a Brigade Commander in the Artsakh Defense Army. Sefilian was awarded with the First Degree Order of the Combat Cross (“Martakan Khach”). He holds the rank of lieutenant-colonel in the Armenian Army. In 1999 he left the ARF. Since 2001, Sefilian has been coordinating the activities of the public initiative group, "Liberated Territories Defense Committee".

Sefilian and Vartan Malkhasian, the leaders of opposition group called the Alliance of Armenian Volunteers, were arrested in 2006. Human rights observers claimed that the arrest was politically motivated and that authorities used a controversial article of the criminal code to intimidate the opposition. Ombudsman of Armenia Armen Harutyunyan also condemned Sefilian's and his friends' arrest and noted that Sefilian, Vartan Malkhasian, and Vahan Aroyan "didn't break the judicial legislation".

According to Armenian-Bulgarian journalist, Colonel Tsvetana Paskaleva, "Jirair is one of the living icons I knew - Bekor, Monte, Samvel Babayan… I'm happy that I know him!"

== Imprisonments ==
=== First arrest ===
On August 6, 2007, Judge Mnatsakan Martirosyan of the Kentron and Nork-Marash Court of First Instance found Sefilian not guilty of violating Article 301 of Armenia's Criminal Code (issuing anti-constitutional statements), but found him guilty of violating the first section of Article 235 of the Criminal Code (illegal possession of a weapon) and sentenced him to 1.5 years imprisonment.

Sefilian claimed his innocence and that no crime has been committed on his part: "This is not a court, this is a theater. Even the biggest supporter of the government cannot show evidence of corpus delicti in our actions. This is all an order. The NSS is working for the interests of two people (Robert Kocharyan and Serzh Sargsyan). All those who had something to do with this case will eventually answer for it. The famous pair is foolishly trying to punish me and to scare the people. My dear people, we must not fear this anti-Armenian regime, we must struggle against it. This amoral regime is not powerful, we are powerful."

In 2012, the European Court of Human Rights fined the Armenian authorities for keeping Sefilian under pre-trial arrest without sufficient legal grounds. According to the court, the National Security Service had illegally wiretapped Sefilian's phone conversations.

On January 31, 2015 Sefilian and other members of Founding Parliament were forcibly barred from entering the territory of the Republic of Artsakh. The Karabakh police attacked the procession of about 30 cars. More than two dozen people, including Sefilian, were injured. As a result, the Karabakh president ordered a police inquiry into the incident.

=== Second arrest ===
On April 8, 2015 Armenian authorities arrested the leaders of the Founding Parliament opposition group seeking to launch antigovernment protests on April 24. The National Security Service and the Investigative Committee of Armenia announced that “organization of mass disturbances at public places on April 24, 2015 has been thwarted as a result of their joint action". Sefilian and his three associates had their homes searched at the same day. Several human rights organizations of Armenia recognized them as political prisoners. The head of Armenian Helsinki Committee Avetik Ishkhanyan called them prisoners of conscience, "because they did not take any action, they did not incite riots, but had only civil disobedience as their goal".

Sefilian and other leading members of the Founding Parliament were released from custody in May 2015 following a prosecutor's request to change the measure of restraint applied against them to a written affidavit not to leave the country.

On June 30, 2015 the Founding Parliament issued a statement claiming that unidentified individuals were following Sefilian for hours. The political movement demanded Armenian law enforcement to identify the individuals following Sefilian.

=== Third arrest ===
On June 20, 2016, Jirair Sefilian was arrested again. According to Armenia's Special Investigation Service, Jirair Sefilian and a group of people planned to seize buildings and communication facilities, including the Yerevan TV tower.

Varuzhan Avetisian, a senior New Armenia member, claimed that the opposition leader was arrested because he planned to campaign against Armenian territorial concessions to Azerbaijan.

On July 17, 2016 a group of armed men close to Sefilian stormed a district police headquarters in Yerevan, taking several hostages. The armed group, calling itself Sasna Tsrer, demanded President Serzh Sargsyan's resignation and tried to negotiate Sefilian's release from prison. The hostage crisis resulted in the death of three policemen, although the gunmen admitted to killing only one and claimed the other two were killed by police.

On August 8, 2016 Sefilian sent a letter from the prison where he demanded Serzh Sargsyan's resignation and snap parliamentary and presidential elections.

Sefilian was released from prison on June 13, 2018, shortly after the 2018 Armenian revolution.

== Citizenship issue ==
Sefilian completed his 18-month sentence on June 9, 2008, and was subsequently released from prison. Sefilian continued to face the threat of deportation from Armenia and began seeking political asylum and citizenship in the Republic of Artsakh. In 2018 Sefilian was granted Armenian citizenship.

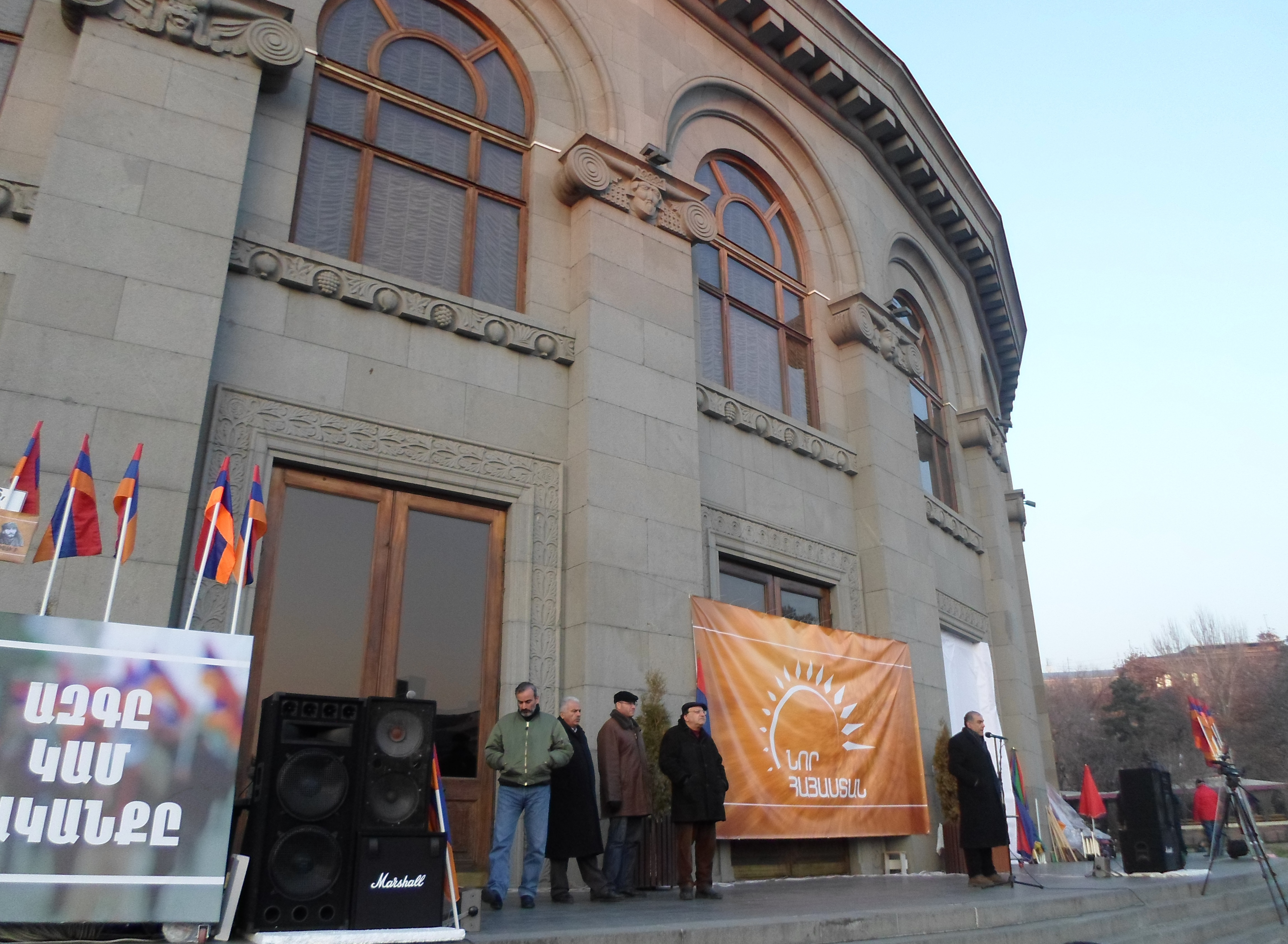
Jirair Sefilian, Petros Makeyan, Varuzan Avetisyan, Hmayak Hovhannisyan, and Garegin Chugasyan at a rally in Freedom Square (December 2015)

== Political views and activities ==
In his letters and announcements made from the prison, Jirair Sefilian supported former Armenian president and opposition leader Levon Ter-Petrosyan despite ideological differences with the latter, but later (in 2009) he criticized Ter-Petrosyan's views on Armenia-Azerbaijan and Armenia-Turkey relations and suggested that he leave the all-Armenian people's movement. On 30 October 2008, Sefilian alongside intellectuals and a group of prominent activists founded the Miatsum (Unification) National Initiative which campaigns against Armenian territorial concessions to Azerbaijan over the Karabakh dispute.

In 2009, together with Tigran Khzmalyan and Alexander Yenikomshian he founded the Sardarapat Movement. Sefilian is the leader of Founding Parliament opposition group.

On 8 May 2013, Sefilian claimed in an interview that Serzh Sargsyan and Robert Kocharyan had a very small role in the First Nagorno-Karabakh War and accused them of corruption. In 2015, along with Raffi Hovannisian, he founded the New Armenia Public Salvation Front to prevent Serzh Sargsyan's constitutional change initiative. He was also the leader of the Founding Parliament opposition group.

Sefilian and his allies frequently speak out against Russian influence in Armenia and Armenia's participation in Russian-led organizations such as the Eurasian Economic Union and the Collective Security Treaty Organization. Instead, he advocates for closer relations with the United States and other Western countries.

In September 2018, Sefilian participated in the founding of the Sasna Tsrer Pan-Armenian Party together with his political allies, including participants in the 2016 Yerevan hostage crisis. Although Sefilian initially sought cooperation with Prime Minister Nikol Pashinyan, he and Sasna Tsrer became more critical of Pashinyan's government over time. In May 2020, Sefilian signed a declaration called for snap elections and the formation of a new government, which was followed by the founding of the National Democratic Pole, a political alliance including Sasna Tsrer. Following the Armenian defeat in the 2020 Nagorno-Karabakh war, Sefilian called for the resignation of Prime Minister Nikol Pashinyan and participated in protests held by the National Democratic Pole. He has called for Armenia to prepare for a new war to recover the territories lost to Azerbaijan during the 2020 war and conquer new territories from Azerbaijan.

== Awards ==
Country	Award	Date
Armenia	Order of the Combat Cross of the First Degree	
