= 2016 Yerevan hostage crisis =

Hostage situation in Yerevan, Armenia

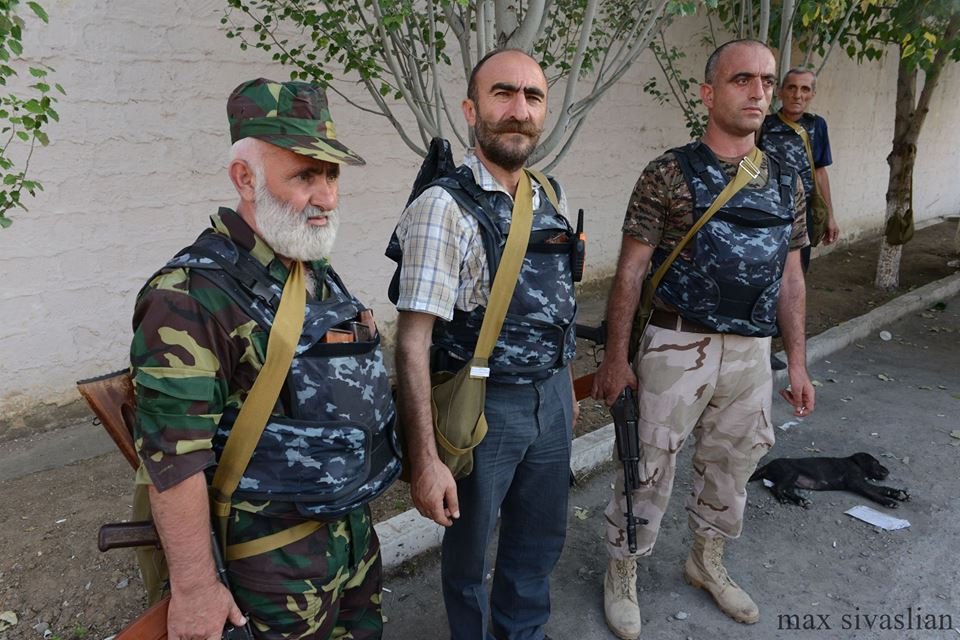
- Armed group leader Pavlik Manukyan (centre) and his men after seizing the police station in Yerevan.
Date	17–31 July 2016
Location	Erebuni District, Yerevan, Armenia

Belligerents
Government of Armenia	Sasna Tsrrer armed group Anti-government protesters

Commanders and leaders
Serzh Sargsyan; Vladimir Gasparyan; Georgi Kutoyan	Pavlik Manukyan; Arayik Khandoyan; Varuzhan Avetisyan

Units involved
Police of Armenia; National Security Service	Sasna Tsrer

Strength
Unknown	31 gunmen 12,000-20,000 protesters

Casualties and losses
3 police officers killed, 26 police officers wounded	5 gunmen wounded, 26 protestors arrested (some released later) Resignation of Serzh Sargsyan

On 17 July 2016, a group of armed men calling themselves the Daredevils of Sasun (Armenian: Սասնա Ծռեր, romanized: Sasna Tsṙer; the name is taken from an epic poem) stormed a police station in Yerevan, Armenia and took nine hostages. They demanded the release of opposition leader Jirair Sefilian and the resignation of President Serzh Sargsyan. The group began a standoff with government forces with growing crowds of protesters joining the calls for the resignation of the president. Two policemen were killed during the standoff and dozens were wounded; one policeman died of his wounds after the end of the crisis. Several of the attackers were wounded as well. In a 2017 survey, 38% of respondents supported Sasna Tsrer's actions, while 16% of them condemned them.

== Background ==
A controversial election occurred in 2013 which led to a loss of popularity for the governing Republican Party of Armenia. The Lebanese-born ethnic Armenian Jirair Sefilian led opposing forces under the formation New Armenia Public Salvation Front. Sefilian was arrested in 2006 on charges of calling for "a violent overthrow of the government" and was jailed for 18 months. He was then released in 2008. In 2015, he and several of his supporters were arrested again on suspicion of preparing a coup, but they were released shortly afterwards. On 20 June 2016, Sefilian was arrested yet again. According to the Armenian Special Investigation Service, Sefilian and a group of people planned to seize buildings and communication facilities, including the Yerevan TV tower. When Sefilian was formally charged with acquiring and possessing weapons when he appeared in court, the allegations of plotting a coup were dropped.

Varuzhan Avetisian, a future Sasna Tsrer member, claimed that the opposition leader was arrested because he planned to campaign against Armenian territorial concessions to Azerbaijan. Tensions in the country have also been running high over Russian mediation attempts following the aftermath of the 2016 Armenian–Azerbaijani clashes, with the Kremlin suggesting to give some land back to Azerbaijan and in turn allow the Nagorno-Karabakh Republic to receive international recognition.

== Hostage taking ==
The Daredevils of Sassoun took over the Erebuni police station in Yerevan around 5:30 a.m. on 17 July 2016. The armed group drove a vehicle through the front door of the police station. During the initial attack, one policeman, Artur Vanoyan, was killed and at least two were injured (one of them, Gagik Mkrtchyan died in hospital on 13 August). Nine people were taken hostage. The attackers demanded the resignation of President Serzh Sargsyan, the release of Jirair Sefilian, and the calling of snap parliamentary and presidential elections and the formation of a new government. Major General Vardan Yeghiazaryan, the deputy head of the Armenian police force, and Colonel Valery Osipyan, the deputy chief of Yerevan’s municipal police force (who later served as chief of police of Armenia), were taken hostage after going to the police station to engage in negotiations with the attackers.

On 18 July, three hostages were released following negotiations. General Vitaly Balasanyan acted as a mediator between the government and the attackers. Future director of the National Security Service of Armenia, Artur Vanetsyan, then working in the counterintelligence division of the NSS, was also involved in the negotiations with the gunmen. Throughout the day Facebook was inaccessible and the websites of media outlets reporting on developments were being shut down.

On 21 July, after releasing two hostages, the gunmen still held onto four hostages total. These hostages included Major General Vardan Yeghiazaryan and Colonel Valery Osipyan.

On 22 July, President Serzh Sargsyan addressed the nation and said, "I urge the armed people, who have occupied the territory of the police headquarters, to show restraint and not endanger the lives of others with their reckless moves. Hostages must be released,” and also added that the armed group must also surrender their weapons. The same day, the Armenian Revolutionary Federation-Supreme Body of Armenia condemned the acts of Sasna Tsrer by stating, "The A.R.F.-Dashnaktsutyun seeks the settlement of the current situation exclusively by peaceful means, considers new bloodshed as unacceptable, demands professionalism from law enforcing agencies, demands that the rights and dignity of law-abiding citizens be respected, and strongly condemns non-political methods and extremist thinking."

On 23 July, there were indications the standoff was over. Four officers were set free, including Vardan Yeghiazaryan and Valery Osipyan. During negotiations, Armenian law enforcement allowed Sasna Tsrer to speak with journalists in a designated neutral zone around the occupied police station. Approximately 40 reporters held a news conference but were not allowed to hold a live broadcast. At the news conference, Pavlik Manukyan, one of the gunmen, stated that the police department has become evil for the people and enjoy lavish lifestyles with the use of unnecessary military equipment for policing.

On 25 July, the gunmen set a police vehicle on fire inside the headquarters, according to police spokesman Ashot Aharonian. It was the third vehicle to have been burned in two days.

On 26 July, attacker Pavlik Manukyan and his son Aram were severely wounded by gunfire. They were escorted to the hospital by police under armed guard and subsequently arrested.

On 27 July, 4 medics were allowed to enter the police station to treat Arayik Khandoyan, one of the armed men who was wounded in the leg but refused to go to the hospital.

On 30 July, the police issued an ultimatum to release all hostages and vacate the building or prepare for a police assault. That day, police officer Yuri Tepanosyan was killed by sniper fire coming from the occupied police building (the attackers deny that they shot Tepanosyan). The group eventually surrendered the next day to avoid further bloodshed. After surrendering, the group issued a statement saying, "We will continue our struggle from prison. We believe that we have achieved our goal: we became the spark that allowed people to rise up and it makes no sense to spill blood." They also stated "We want the people, and the international community, to realise that this is a national liberation movement against Russian colonialism".

== Protests ==
Over 1,500 anti-government protesters held a rally in Yerevan on 18 July, calling for a peaceful resolution to the crisis. Violent protests also occurred where opposition supporters threw stones at police outside the hostage situation. They were hit back with tear gas and stun grenades. On 25 July, in a large show of support, thousands of protesters marched in Yerevan chanting "unity" and called for bystanders to join them—who swelled their numbers—as the march progressed toward Yerevan’s central Republic Square. On 28 July, riot police fired stun and flash grenades on one group of protesters and journalists, while a large group of plainclothes police attacked them with metal rods and entered neighboring homes. 60 people were injured. The international community condemned these attacks and the attacks on the journalists.14 journalists were attacked during the incident. Several political activists were arrested including Alexander Yenikomshian, Armen Martirosyan, Andrias Ghukasyan, David Sanasaryan. Yeghishe Petrosyan, one of the leaders of "Ardzagank" rock band, was also arrested and then released.

Future prime minister of Armenia Nikol Pashinyan, then an opposition parliamentarian, also participated in the protests and went to the occupied police station to speak to the members of Sasna Tsrer on the first day of the hostage crisis. Pashinyan was accused by members of Sasna Tsrer of trying to hijack the protests for his own individual and partisan interests.

On 30 July, some 5,000 demonstrators chose to march down Baghramyan Avenue towards the presidential residence and government buildings but were met with police, who placed coils of barbed wire across the avenue to stop the protestors. Demonstrators still managed to block traffic for two hours and eventually dispersed the following day. The protests in Yerevan continued from 1 to 11 August following the end of the hostage crisis. On 4 August, during a rally in Yerevan, about 20 protesters were taken into police custody.

== Casualties ==
Policeman Artur Vanoyan was killed by the attackers on the first day of the crisis, 17 July, while policeman Gagik Mkrtchyan was wounded that day and later died of his wounds.

The Armenian interior ministry stated 51 people were injured during protests on July 21, 28 of whom were police officers due to stone throwing from protestors. Police reported 136 people were detained during protests on 21 July. Protesters taken to police regiments were reportedly beaten and not given food or water for hours.

According to the police, on 30 July a sniper opened fire from inside the police station and killed a police officer, Yuri Tepanosyan, who was sitting in a car parked 350–400 metres (about 1,200 feet) away, bringing the total police death count to two. Sasna Tsrer denied responsibility for the shooting and said they did not have a line of sight to have shot the officer, which police deny. The gunmen suggested that Tepanosyan could have been shot by police snipers by mistake.

On 30 July, an Armenian protester, Kajik Grigoryan, attempted self-immolation, burning over 50 per cent of his body. On 2 August, he died in hospital.

On 16 March 2017, Arthur Sargsyan, also known as the “Bread bringer”, who brought food to the Sasna Tsrer armed group, died in prison. After the news came out, his supporters organized marches in Yerevan.

== Aftermath ==
As a result of internal investigation in the Armenian police, a number of policemen were fined. The Chief of Yerevan Police, Lieutenant General Ashot Karapetyan, also received a strict warning and was relieved of his duties on 8 August. He was sacked upon order of the Armenian Chief of Police Vladimir Gasparyan.

Most of the gunmen were charged with taking hostages and illegal possession of weapons and military equipment. Sasna Tsrer member Smbat Barseghyan was charged with the murder of police officers Yuri Tepanosyan and Artur Vanoyan. Another member, Armen Bilyan, was charged with the murder of policeman Gagik Mkrtchyan. Most of the attackers, save for Barseghyan and Bilyan, were released after the 2018 Armenian revolution, along with their political ally Jirair Sefilian. In September 2018, Sefilian and his political supporters, including many of the participants in the 2016 attack, founded the Sasna Tsrer Pan-Armenian Party.

On 24 February 2021, the trial of ten key participants in the 2016 attack ended. Smbat Barseghyan was sentenced to 25 years imprisonment for the murder of Tepanosyan and Vanoyan. Armen Bilyan was cleared of the charge of murdering Gagik Mkrtchyan and was released. However, Bilyan was convicted of other crimes and sentenced to four years and eleven months imprisonment. Other Sasna Tsrer members Pavlik Manukyan, Varuzhan Avetisyan, Armen Mkhitaryan, Gagik Yeghiazaryan and Areg Kyureghyan were sentenced to seven years imprisonment; Eduard Grigoryan was sentenced to six years, while Sedrak Nazaryan received eight years. One of the defendants, Arayik Khandoyan, died of a heart attack before the conclusion of the trial.

== Reactions ==
=== Armenian ===
First Deputy Police Chief Hunan Poghosyan said during the early days: "Talks are underway with the hostage-takers. We are doing our best to resolve the situation without bloodshed."

On 29 July, activists called upon members of the Armenian diaspora to raise awareness of the "regime violence" in Armenia. Within the North American diaspora, Serj Tankian wrote in favor of the protesters and Lebanese-born Arsinée Khanjian participated in the protests and spoke in favor of the protests. She was detained by police at one point. In Europe, three French-Armenian organizations (Renaissance Arménienne, Charjoum le Mouvement and CollectifAzatDzayn) declared their support for the protesters.

=== International ===
The European Union's Federica Mogherini issued a statement that read: "The latest developments... are very worrying. We call for an immediate release of the medical staff that is being held hostage. At the same time, we reiterate our call on the Armenian authorities to refrain from excessive use of force by the police in handling public manifestations. Likewise, demonstrators need to refrain from violence in the exercise of their civil rights. Use of force and violence to achieve political change are not acceptable. Conflicts need to be resolved through political dialogue with a respect for democracy, rule of law and fundamental freedoms."

According to Human Rights Watch, Armenian police used excessive force against peaceful protesters on 29 July 2016, and assaulted journalists reporting on the demonstrations. The police also beat journalists and protesters and detained dozens of people: “While the police have an obligation to maintain public order, they do not have carte blanche to use violence against people gathered to peacefully express their views.”

Reporters Without Borders also issued a statement. Freedom House published an analysis reporting that the occupation of a police station "drew unexpected public support".
