= Miatsum =

Concept and slogan

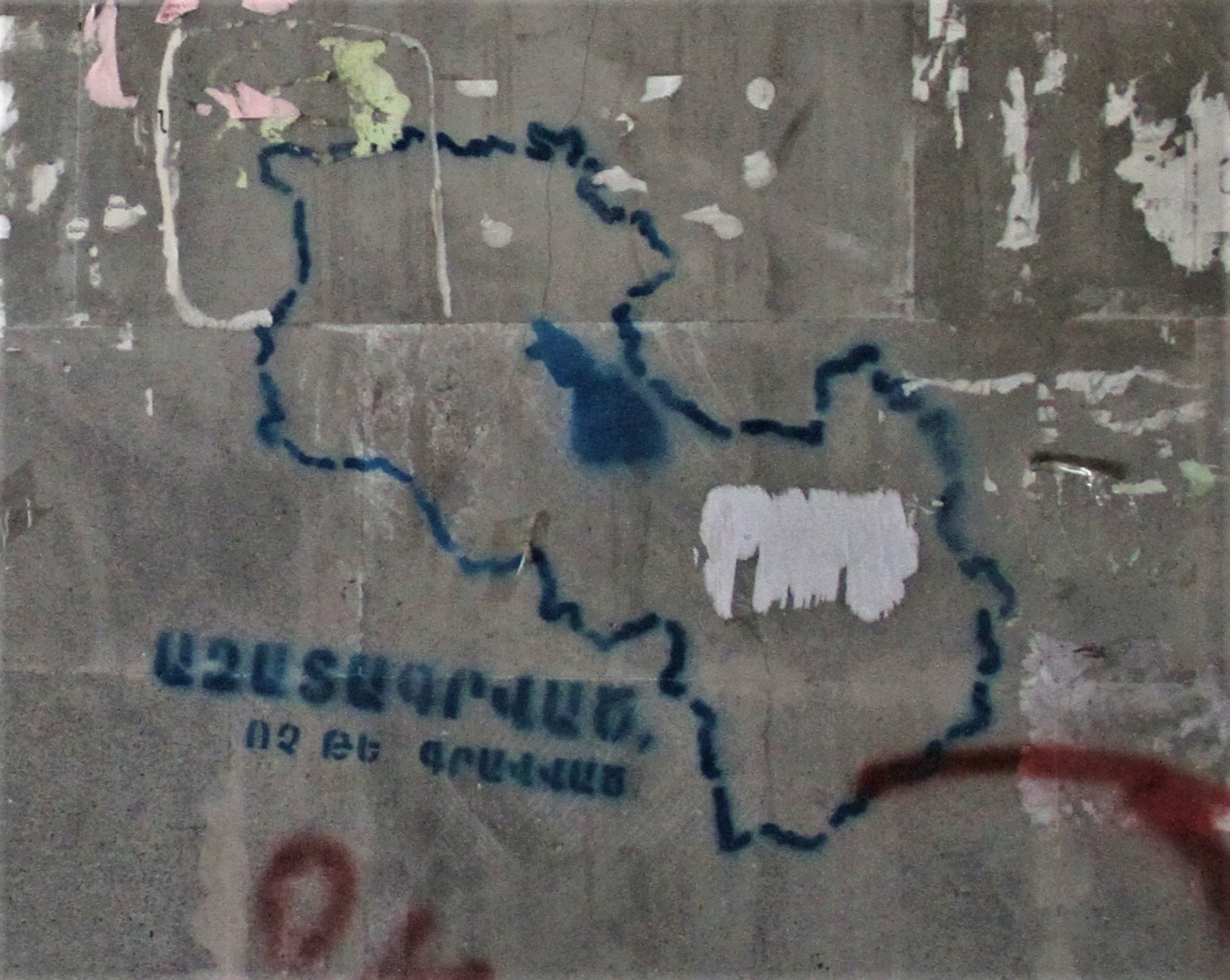
Graffiti in Yerevan with the outline of a united Armenia and Republic of Artsakh, with text in Armenian saying "Liberated, not occupied".

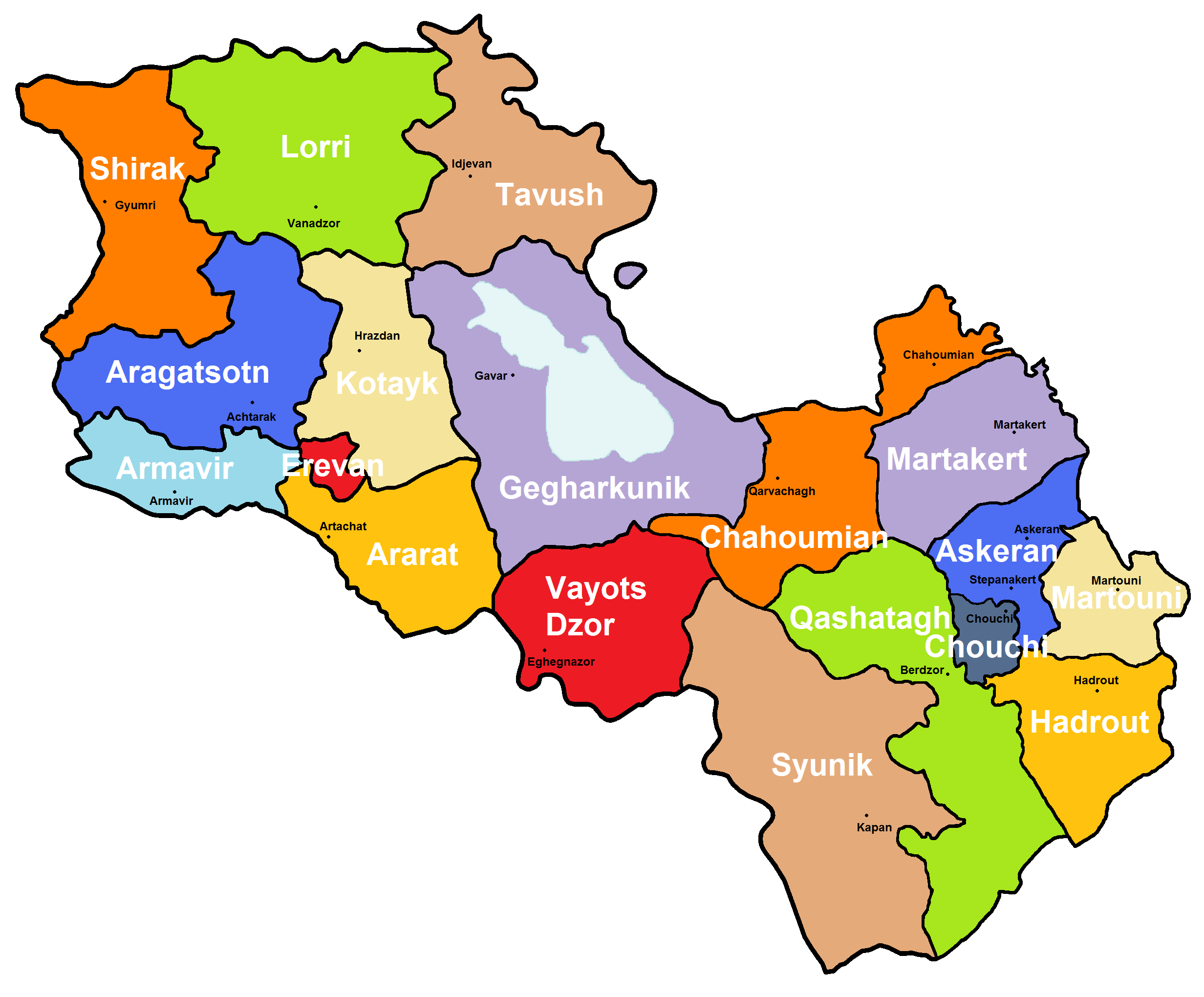
Map showing the provinces of a united Armenia and Republic of Artsakh.

Miatsum (Armenian: Միացում, romanized: Unification) was a concept and a slogan used during the Karabakh movement in the late 1980s and early 1990s, which led to the First Nagorno-Karabakh War in 1992–1994.

== Background ==
The idea originated in an era of realignment among the Armenians who were unhappy that the area inhabited predominantly by an Armenian population has remained under the jurisdiction of Azerbaijan. From the 1970s, with the support of the first secretary of the Central Committee of Communist Party of Azerbaijan SSR, Heydar Aliyev, a policy of settling NKAO by Azerbaijanis was being implemented. The Armenian pogroms in Sumgait and Baku only exacerbated these trends, which led to military clashes between troops of the Republic of Azerbaijan and the forces of the Nagorno-Karabakh Defense Army (Artsakh). The idea of "Miatsum" among the Armenians of Nagorno-Karabakh was so central that virtually no one considered the region to be separate from Armenia.

== See also ==
- Enosis
- United Armenia
- First Nagorno-Karabakh War
- Lachin corridor
- History of Nagorno-Karabakh
- Wilsonian Armenia
