= New Armenia Public Salvation Front =

The New Armenia Public Salvation Front is an opposition party to the Republican Party of Armenia, led by Lebanese-born Armenian Jirair Sefilian.

In June 2016, Sefilyan and six of his supporters were arrested and accused of preparing to seize government buildings and telecoms facilities in the capital, Yerevan.
