= Alexander Yenikomshian =

Armenian politician

Alec Yenikomshian
- Ալեք Ենիգոմշեան
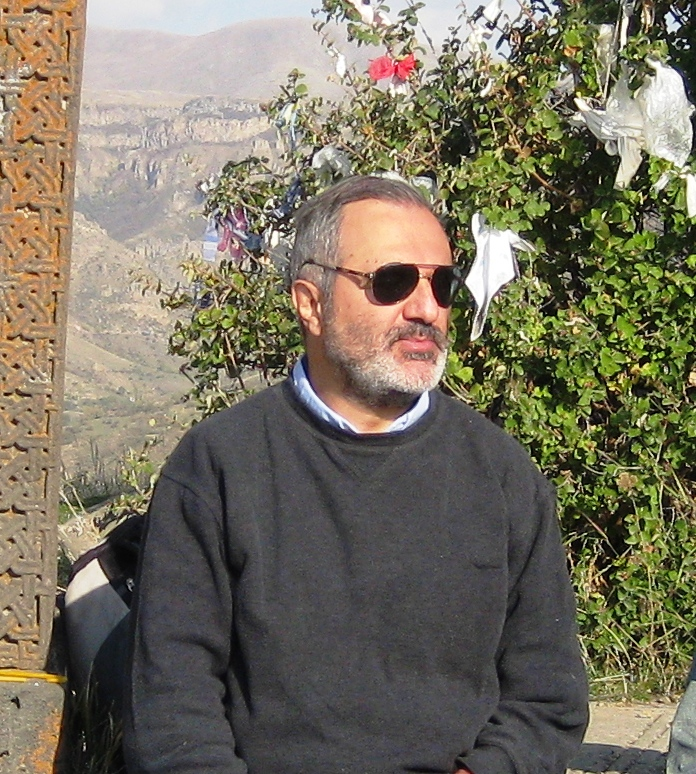
- Alec Yenikomshian
- Born: 1955 (age 70–71); Beirut, Lebanon
- Education: American University of Beirut (Economics)
- Occupations: Political activist, journalist
- Years active: 1970s–present
- Organizations: ASALA, Founding Parliament, Monte Melkonyan public organization
- Known for: ASALA involvement, political activism in Armenia
- Notable work: Host of Aylentrank radio show
- Criminal charges: Illegal explosives possession (1980, Switzerland)
- Criminal penalty: 18-month suspended sentence and expulsion

Ara-Alexander "Alec" Yenikomshian (Armenian: Ալեք Ենիգոմշեան) (also known as Alec or Alex Yenikomechian) is an Armenian political activist and journalist, a member of Founding Parliament secretariat, co-founder of the "Miatsum Initiative", Director of the "Monte Melkonyan" public organization, and former member of the Armenian Secret Army for the Liberation of Armenia (ASALA).

== Biography ==
Ara-Alexander Yenikomshian was born in 1955 in Beirut. In 1978 he finished the Faculty of Economy of the American University of Beirut.

He is best known for his participation in a Geneva hotel bombing on October 3, 1980, when a bomb that he was preparing together with Suzy Mahseredjian went off prematurely, leaving him blind and severing his left hand. Being the first disclosed members of ASALA, Yenikomshian and US citizen Mahseredjian were arrested. Authorities charged that the two had been waiting to be told where to plant the bomb when it exploded.

Yenikomshian was convicted on an illegal-explosives charge, given an 18-month suspended sentence and expelled from Switzerland. Mahseredjian was convicted of extorting money for the ASALA, given an 18-month suspended sentence and expelled to the United States.

Their arrest led to the formation of a new ASALA group called the "October 3 Group", which subsequently attacked Swiss targets in reprisal against the arrest and prosecution of Mahseredjian and Yenikomshian.

In 1996 he moved to Armenia. Yenikomshian hosts Aylentrank on Lratvakan radio. He is a member of the Secretary of the PreParliament public organization (Armenia) and a leader of Sardarapat Movement.

== Arrest ==
In July 2016 he participated in negotiations between the Armenian National Security Service (NSS) and the representatives of Sasna Tsrer group, that held the police building in Erebuni district of Yerevan from July 17 to July 31. He has been one of the main speakers at public rallies in Yerevan in the wake of the July 17 seizure of a police building.

On July 27, 2016 Yenikomshian was arrested and held at the National Security Service detention center. His lawyer, Nikolay Baghdasaryan, reported that his client, who is blind and has one arm, was being kept in conditions deleterious to his health. "Yenikomshian cannot eat or move about normally. The conditions at the detention center are bad," he said. The lawyer believes the opposition activist was arrested merely to stop him from leading demonstrations. Baghdasaryan also called for an intervention by the Armenia's Human Rights Defender. Monte Melkonian's family, the Armenian Bar Association also appealed for his release.

On August 8 the prosecutor decided to change the measure of restrain for Yenikomshian and he was released from Armavir penitentiary.
