= Georgia–Germany relations =

- Georgia: Germany

The Georgia–Germany relations are the diplomatic, economic and cultural ties between Georgia and Germany, which go back several centuries. Germany pushed for the independence of the First Georgian Republic following the First World War and was one of the first countries to recognize the newly formed state in 1918, making it the protectorate of the German Empire. The bilateral relations were interrupted due to Georgia's forcible incorporation into the Soviet Union in 1922, but were restored on 13 April 1992 following the dissolution of the USSR.

In the 20th century, tens of thousands of Georgians fought on the side of Germany during the First World War and in the course of the Second World War. In the 21st century, the two countries also cooperated militarily during the decades-long campaign in Afghanistan, where Georgia was one of the largest troop contributors and at times operated under German command.

Overall, Georgia and Germany maintain friendly relations despite periodic frustration with Germany's cautious stance on NATO enlargement and issues related to Russia.

== Germans in Georgia ==
In 1815, while participating in the Congress of Vienna, Russian emperor Alexander I visited Stuttgart, a city in his mother's native Kingdom of Württemberg. Upon witnessing the oppression of local peasants due to their non-Lutheran faith or as a result of their participation in separatist movements, the Emperor arranged for their settlement in the suburbs of Tiflis, the historical capital of Georgia, with the aim of forming agricultural colonies. On September 21, 1818 the first German settlement of Marienfeld, now Tbilisi, was established by a group of Swabian Germans. Two months later another group of colonists founded a settlement on the bank of the Asureti River and named it Elisabethtal, after the Emperor's wife Elisabeth Alexeievna. Within the next year five more colonies were established: New Tiflis and Alexandersdorf (both part of modern Tbilisi), Petersdorf (now part of Sartichala), and Katharinenfeld (present-day Bolnisi). Three more colonies were founded in Abkhazia: Neudorf, Gnadenberg and Lindau.

From 1906 to 1922, Kurt von Kutschenbach published the German-language newspaper Kaukasische Post, that called itself the "only German newspaper in the Caucasus". Editor-in-chief was the writer and journalist Arthur Leist.

== History ==
=== First Republic ===
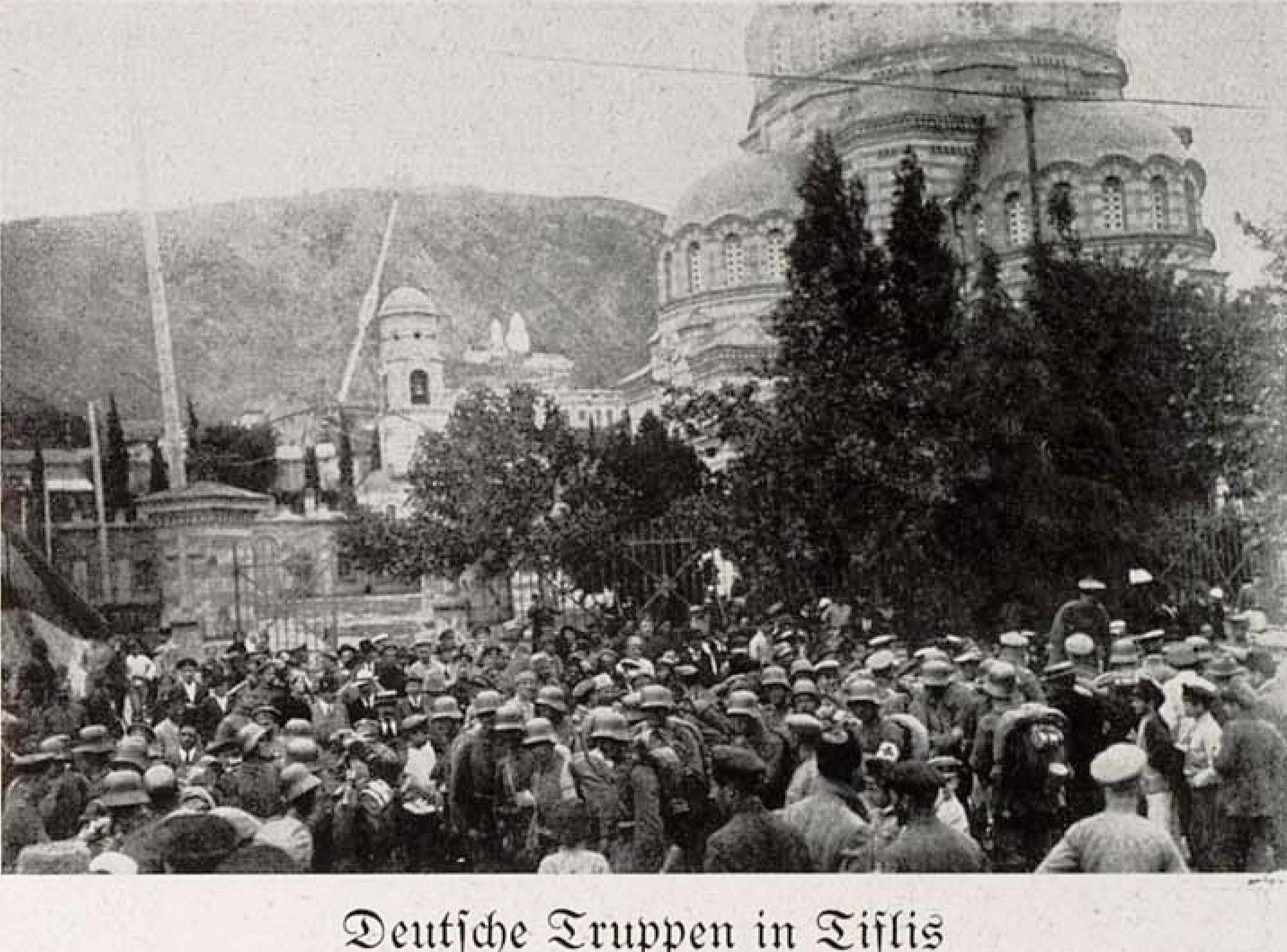
German troops in Tbilisi, 1918

During the First World War, Germany gave support to the Committee of Independent Georgia, as well as organising a military unit called the Georgian Legion.

When Georgia first achieved independence in 1918, the country's geopolitical situation was complicated. To maintain its fledgling sovereignty and keep both Russia and Turkey at bay, Georgia became a protectorate of the German Empire, which sent a contingent of troops under the leadership of General Friedrich Freiherr Kress von Kressenstein.

The German involvement was short-lived but effective - Berlin pressured Turkey into respecting Georgia's ethnic borders and by July 1918, Turkey handed over all Georgian ports and railways it had controlled up to that point. Germany also lent millions of Marks to the new republic. Despite cordial German-Georgian relations, Germany had to retreat from the country shortly after it lost in World War I. Its place was taken by Britain.

=== Soviet period ===
By the 1940s, Germans lived in over 20 towns in Georgia and numbered at more than 24,000. As a result of anti-German policies of the Soviet government during World War II, from October 1941 to April 1942 most of Georgia's Germans, in total 19,186 people, were deported from the republic by the Soviet authorities.

=== Recent history ===
Ahead of the 2025 local elections, the Georgian Ministry of Foreign Affairs summoned the German ambassador, suggesting he was part of attempts to promote a "radical agenda" in the country.

== Migration ==
By conservative estimates, ethnic Georgians in Germany number between 4,500 and 5,000.

St. King Vakhtang Gorgasali Georgian Orthodox Church serves the Georgian community of Munich and St. Anthim the Iberian Georgian Orthodox Church serves Düsseldorf.

== Resident diplomatic missions ==
- Georgia has an embassy in Berlin.
- Germany has an embassy in Tbilisi.
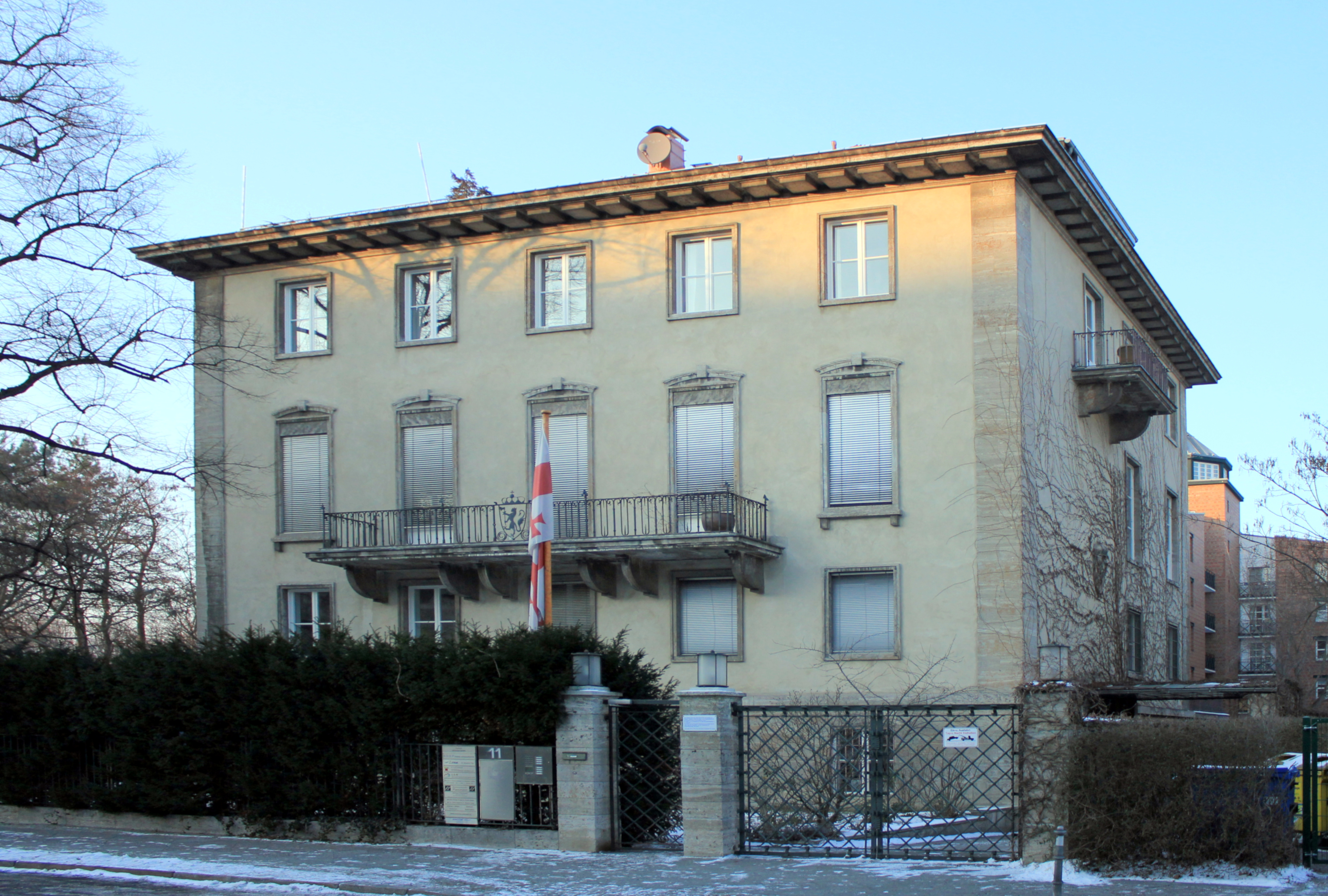
Embassy of Georgia in Berlin

== See also ==
- Treaty of Poti
- Foreign relations of Georgia
- Foreign relations of Germany
- Georgia-NATO relations
- Georgia-EU relations
  - Accession of Georgia to the EU
