= Jason Kereselidze =

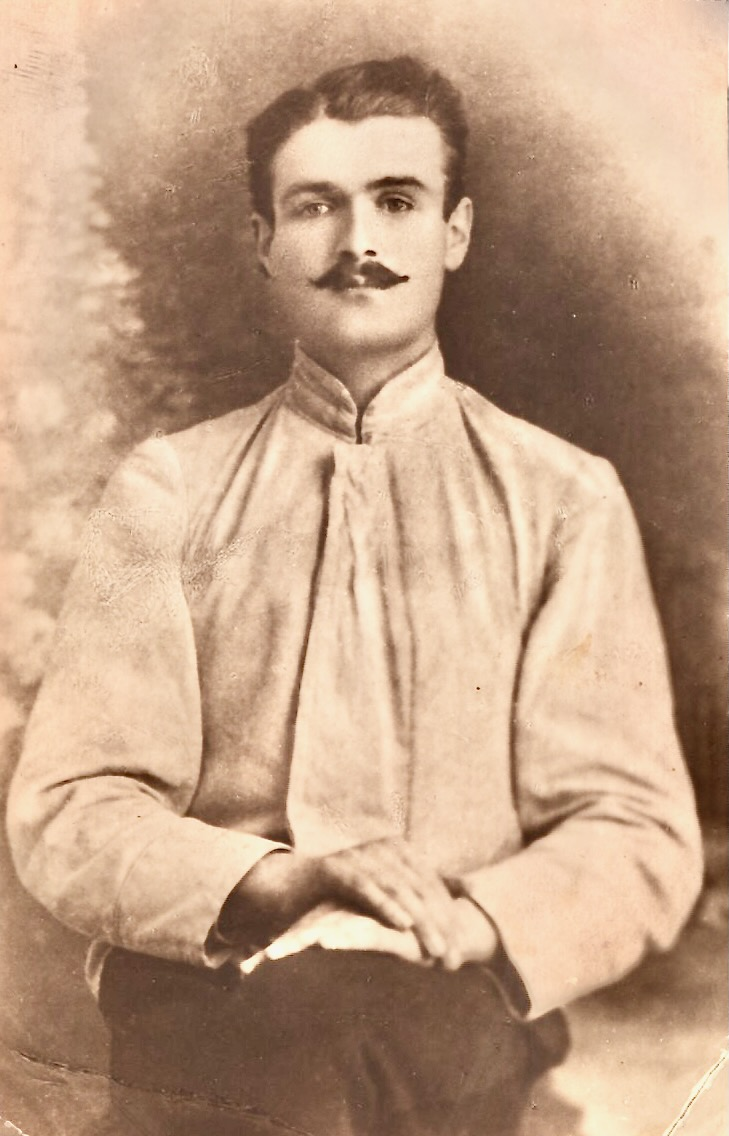
Jason Kereselidze

Jason Mates dze Kereselidze (Georgian: იასონ მათეს ძე კერესელიძე; born 1891 – May 20, 1923) was a Georgian public figure who was part of the anti-Soviet national liberation movement. His pro-independence activities resulted in his arrest and execution by the Bolsheviks.

== Biography ==
Kereselidze was born in Tbilisi. He was one of three brothers and the younger brother of Leo Kereselidze, who would go on to be an officer in the Georgian Legion, in German and Ottoman service during World War I. According to Mikheil Tsereteli's writings in Bedi Kartlisa, patriotism was an important part of the Kereselidze household and the "sons brought from their father's house the duty to fight for their homeland, a burning love for it".

Since 1913, he was a member of the Society for the Spreading of Literacy among Georgians for Gori, Georgia.

Following the Red Army invasion of Georgia in 1921, he was active in the military center of the National Democratic Party of Georgia and the Georgian Independence Committee.

Due to his pro-independence activities, Kereselidze was arrested and executed by the Bolsheviks on May 20, 1923, in Tbilisi, in the area of what is now Vake Park. He was shot alongside numerous other prominent Georgian anti-Soviet figures, such as Kote Abkhazi and Aleksandre Andronikashvili. Kereselidze's last words before execution were to sing Dideba, Georgia's national anthem at the time.

In 2023, Kereselidze was officially recognized as National Hero of Georgia. There is a street named after him in Tbilisi.

== See also ==
- Dimitri Vardanashvili
- Kote Abkhazi
- Aleksandre Andronikashvili
- Sardion Tevzadze
- Simon Mchedlidze
