= Orders, decorations, and medals of Georgia =

Orders, decorations, and medals of Georgia are the orders, state decorations and medals that are granted by the national government of Georgia for meritorious achievements in national defence, state improvement, and the development of democracy and human rights.

They may be granted to any citizen of Georgia and to people with foreign citizenship or without any citizenship. Individuals may also be honoured posthumously with state awards. Nominations are made by government officials.

Most of the Georgian state awards were established in 1992. Six years later, in 1998, the Order of the Golden Fleece was created. In 2004, the St. George's Victory Order and the Order of the National Hero of Georgia were added. Additional orders were created in 2009.

The current Georgian Law on Georgian State Awards recognises 12 official awards: National Hero Award; St. George's Victory Order; David Agmashenebeli Order; Queen Tamar's Order; Presidential Order of Excellence, St. Nicholas Order; Golden Fleece Order; Vakhtang Gorgasali's Order – I, II, III ranks, Order of Honour, Medal “Civil Commitment”; Medal “Military Courage”; Medal “Military Honour”; “Honour” Medal.

== State and military awards ==
=== Order of the National Hero of Georgia ===
Established in 2004, the Order of the National Hero of Georgia is the country's highest state decoration exclusively granted for heroism. Among others, it was awarded to Zhiuli Shartava (posthumously, 2004), Zaza Damenia (posthumously, 2008), John McCain (2010), Lech Kaczyński (posthumously, 2010), Giorgi Antsukhelidze (posthumously, 2013), Zurab Iarajuli (posthumously, 2013).

=== St. George's Victory Order ===
Established in 2004, the St. George's Victory Order is awarded to individuals who have significantly contributed to victorious battles and general significant victories for Georgia.

=== Order of David IV The Builder ===
Created in 1992, the Order of David IV The Builder is also known as the David Agmashenebeli Order. It is given to regular citizens, military and clerical personnel for outstanding contributions to the country, for fighting for the independence of Georgia and its revival, and for significantly contributing to social consolidation and the development of democracy.

=== Order of Queen Tamara ===
Established in 2009, the Order of Queen Tamara is awarded to regular citizens for their significant achievements in public or social spheres and outstanding service to the country and its people.

=== Presidential Order of Excellence ===
The Presidential Order of Excellence was established on 31 July 2009 and is awarded by the President of Georgia to individuals for outstanding achievements in the spheres of culture, education, science, art, sport etc. and for the significant achievements in the relevant fields of social life and meritorious service for Georgia.

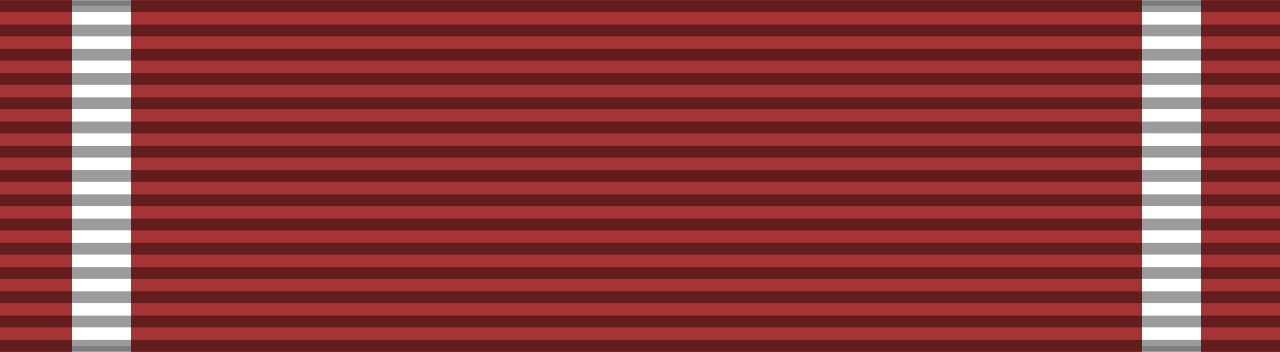
=== Order of St. Nicholas ===
Established on July 31, 2009, in accordance with parliamentary decree number 1553, the Order of St. Nicholas is awarded to individuals for outstanding charitable or social activities in free service to the country and the people.

=== Order of the Golden Fleece ===
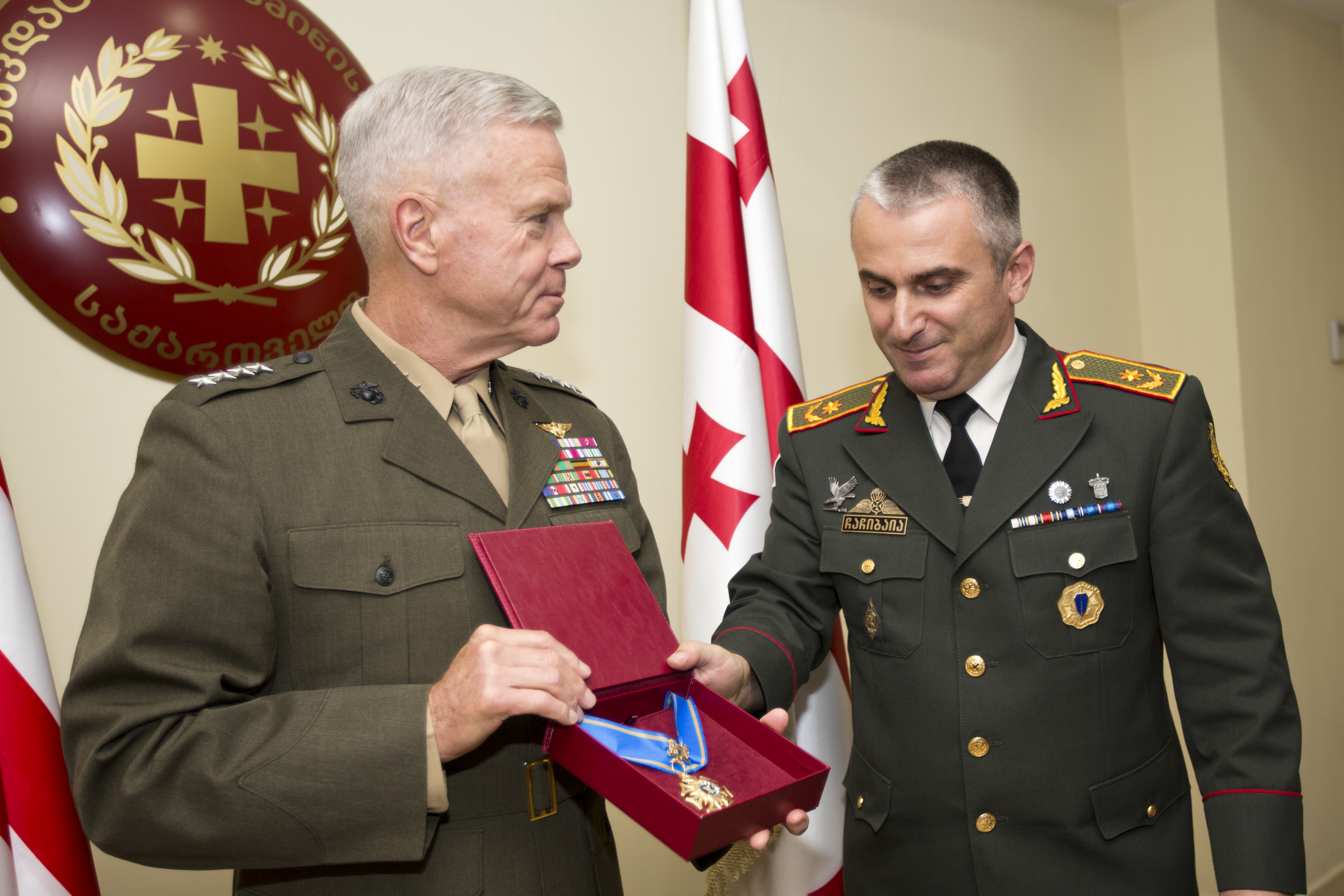
American general James F. Amos is presented with the Order of the Golden Fleece by Georgian general Vladimer Chachibaia in Tbilisi in 2014.

Established on 26 June 1998, the Order of the Golden Fleece is awarded to individuals with foreign citizenship and those holding no citizenship who have significantly contributed to governmental improvement, national security interests, sovereignty and protection of territorial unity, formation of democratic and free society, development of useful bilateral relationships with foreign countries and international organizations, protection of rights of Georgian citizens living abroad, popularization of Georgian culture, and development of Georgian science and art. Turkish Prime Minister Recep Tayyip Erdoğan is a notable recipient of the Order.

=== Vakhtang Gorgasali Order ===
Established in 1992, the Vakhtang Gorgasali Order is a three-degree military decoration awarded to personnel who displayed courage and heroism in fighting for and protecting the motherland and its territorial unification, while skillfully leading their troops and creating and carrying out successful military operations.

=== Order of Honor ===
Established in 1992, the Order of Honour is awarded to citizens who took part in the building process of an independent government – devoted themselves, displayed heroism and actively participated in approving and sustaining the following – governing, defense, law and order, farming, health protection, achievement in the fields of science, education, culture, literature, art and sports. It was awarded to Zaza Aleksidze, Nikoloz Beruchashvili, Jansug Charkviani and other.

=== Civic Dedication Medal ===
The Medal for Civic Dedication is awarded to a person for exemplary civic action - for dedicated civic action, for displaying exceptional civic responsibility and for personal courage.

=== Military Courage Medal ===
Created in 1992, the Military Courage Medal is awarded to military and police personnel for protecting their motherland while displaying bravery and courage when carrying out military duties, for heroic and daring actions.

=== Military Honor Medal ===
Established in 1992, the Military Honor Medal is awarded to Georgian military personnel and citizens who actively participated in the protection of their motherland and its territorial unity.

=== Honor Medal ===
Established on 24 December 1992, the Honor Medal is awarded to Georgian citizens who actively participated in the revival of Georgia and devoted themselves to noble deeds.

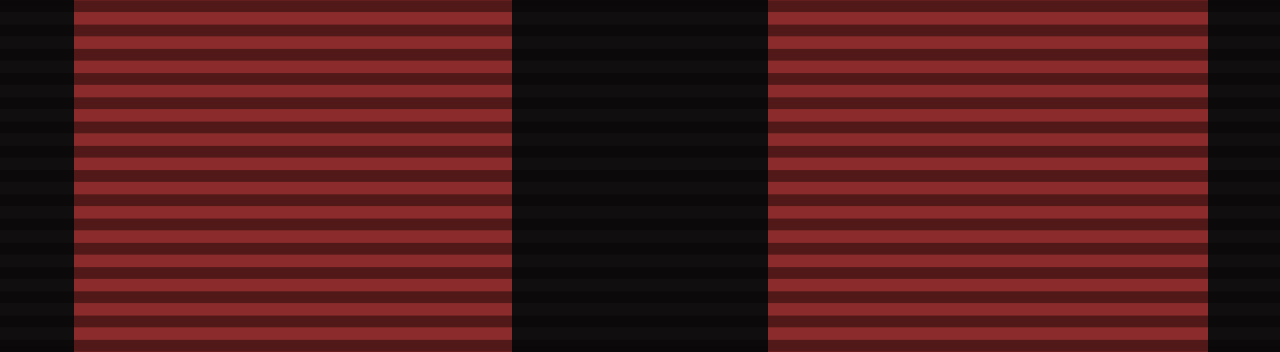
=== Devotion to the Motherland Medal ===
Awarded to military personnel for distinguished success in benefit of the country's defence during war and peacetime;
- to military units for successful operations
- to military individuals for extraordinary bravery and devotion to duty in life-threatening situations
- to single military individuals and units for extraordinary performance during a state of emergency

=== Didgori Cross ===
Established in 2014, in honour of the Battle of Didgori, the Didgori Cross is awarded to servicemen and women of the Georgian Armed Forces for extraordinary courage and achievements during battle, leadership and initiative. Major Vitali Zkhadadze of the Georgian Armed Forces 43rd battalion, 4th Mechanized Infantry Brigade is the first soldier to get awarded the Didgori Cross on the day of its establishment.

== Royal orders ==
=== Order of the Eagle of Georgia ===
Established in the 12th century and reinstated in 1939, the Order of the Eagle of Georgia is a five-grade chivalric decoration of the Bagrationi dynasty. It is awarded to members of royal houses, patriarchs as well as political and military figures. Notable recipients include Queen Elizabeth II; Prime Ministers Yukio Hatoyama of Japan and Bidzina Ivanishvili of Georgia; and Kings Umberto II of Italy, Boris III of Bulgaria, Simeon II of Bulgaria and George Tupou V of Tonga.

- 1st grade - Lady / Knight Grand Collar (GColEG)
- 2nd grade - Lady / Knight Grand Cross (GCEG)
- 3rd grade - Lady / Knight Grand Officer (GOEG)
- 4th grade - Lady / Knight Commander (KCEG)
- 5th grade - Lady / Knight (KEG)

=== Order of Saint Queen Tamar ===
First established as the Insignia of Saint Queen Tamar by the Georgian Legion in 1911, it recognizes those who have rendered distinguished military, political, diplomatic, or other service to Georgia and its national cause.

=== Order of the Crown ===
Established by Prince Davit Bagration of Mukhrani on 25 April 2009, it is awarded in recognition of extraordinary service to Georgia, the Royal House, the Georgian monarchical cause, and the wider public good. The Motto of the Order is “Verba movent, exempla trahunt” (Words move people; examples compel them).

== Gallery ==
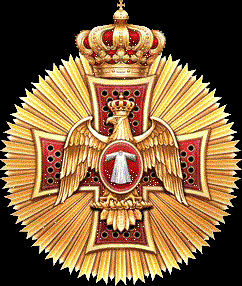
Grand Cross, Order of the Eagle of Georgia

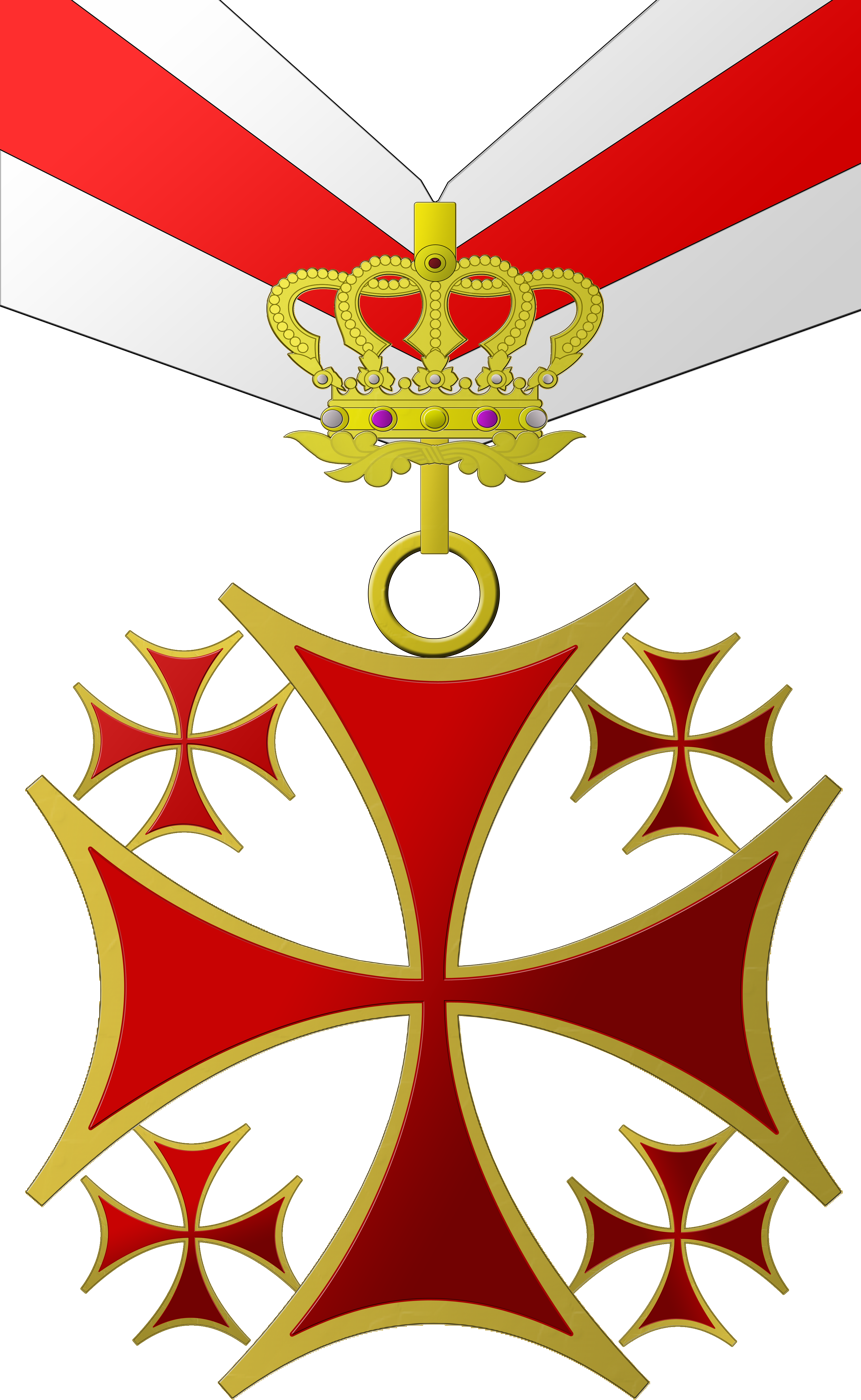
Order of the National Hero of Georgia

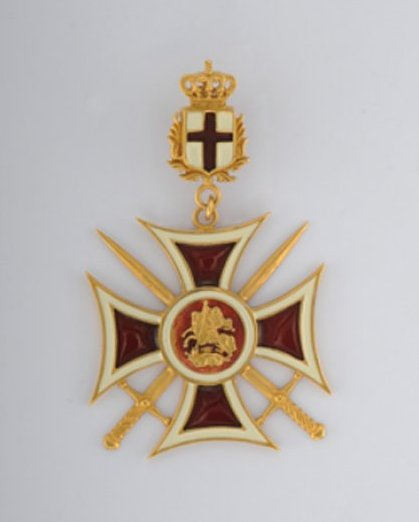
St. George's Victory Order

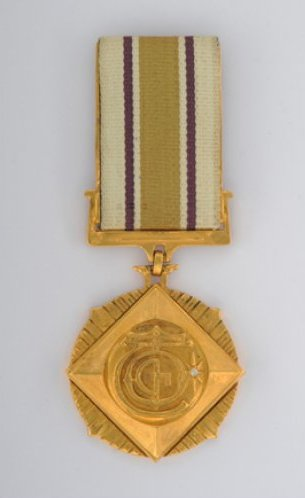
Order of David IV The Builder

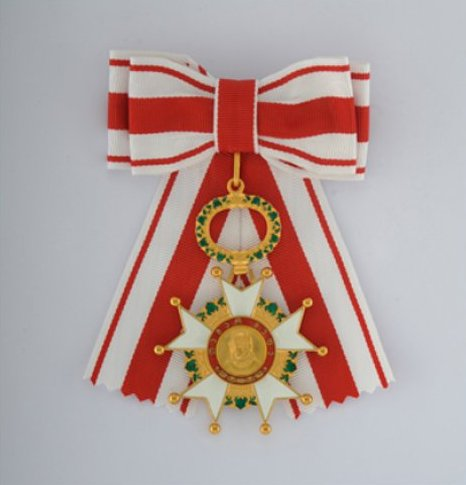
Order of Queen Tamar

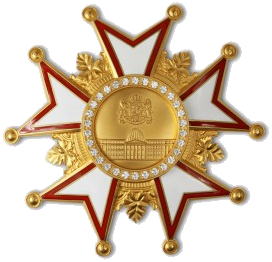
Presidential Order of Excellence

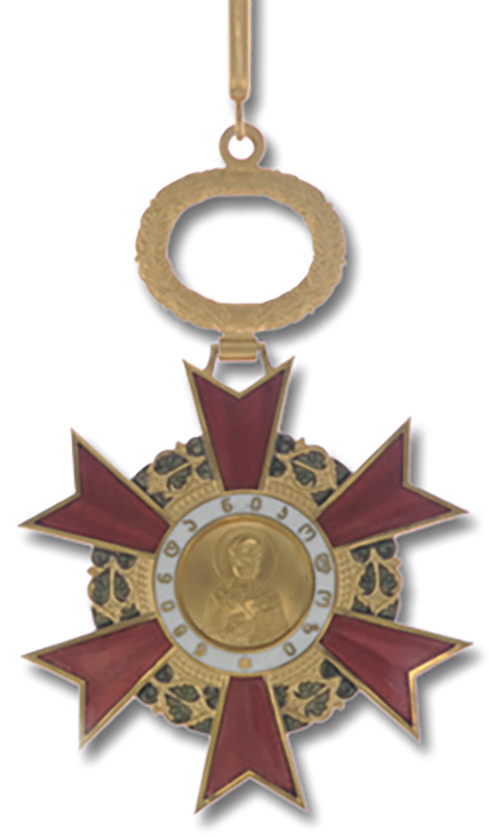
Order of St. Nicholas

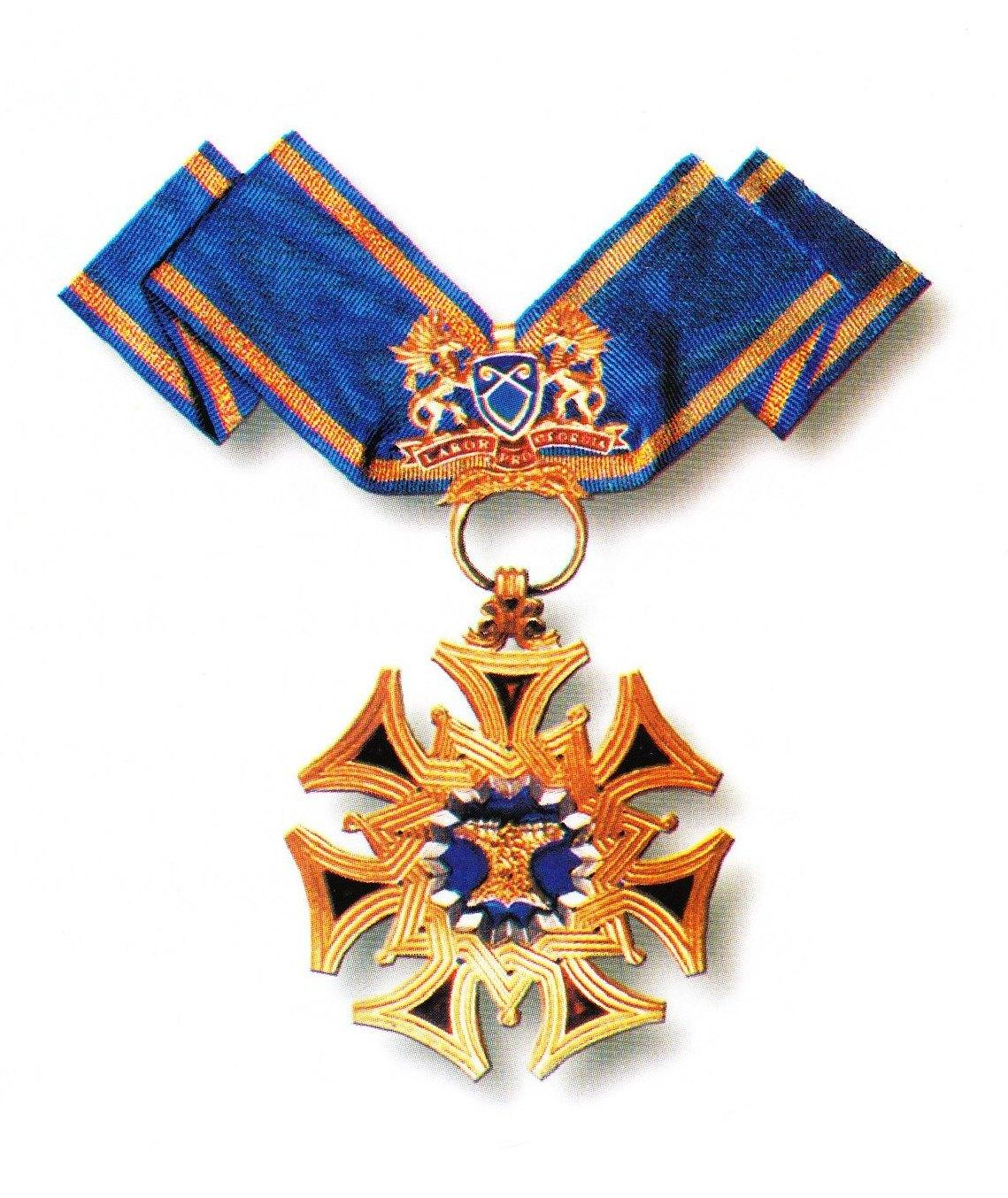
Order of the Golden Fleece

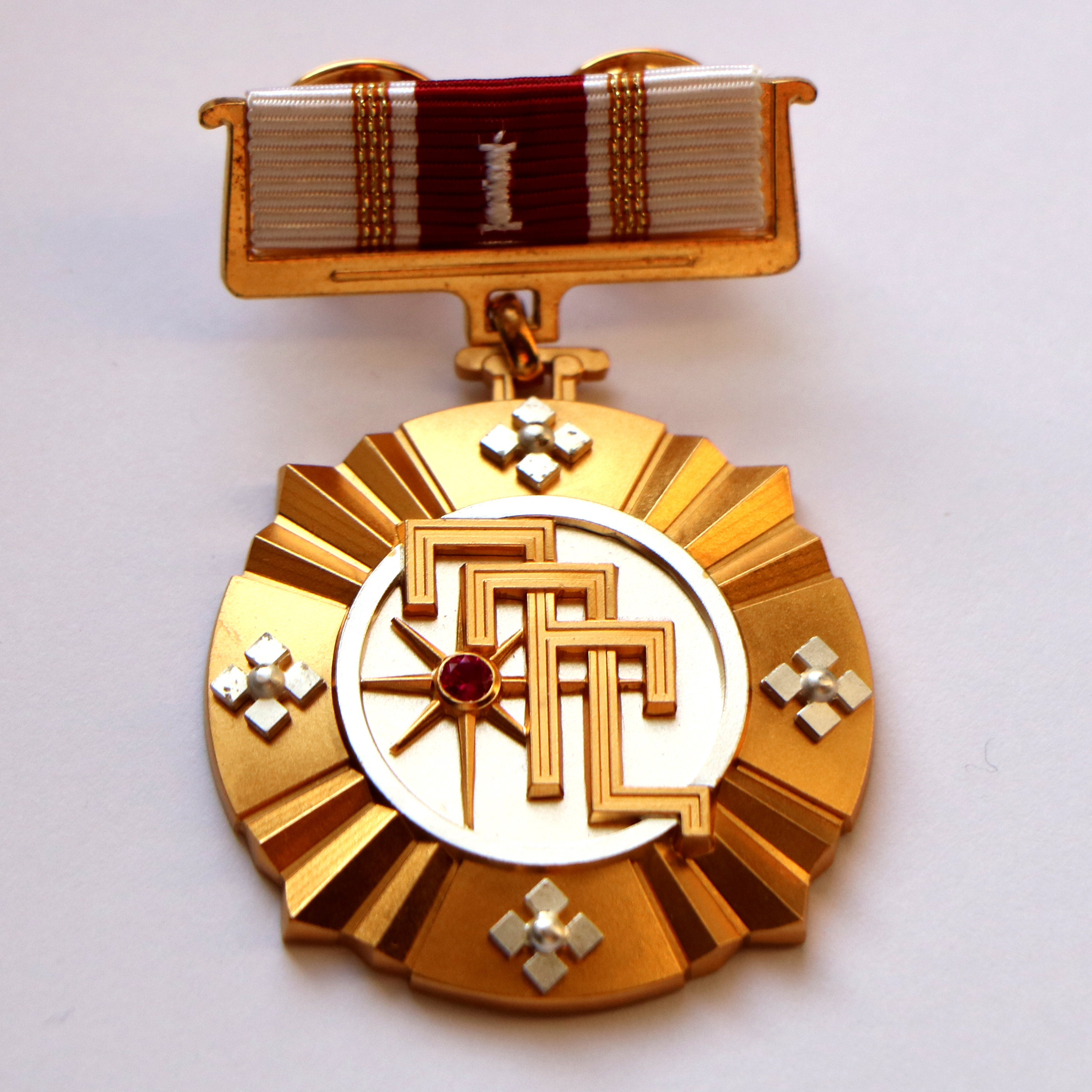
Vakhtang Gorgasali Order, rank I

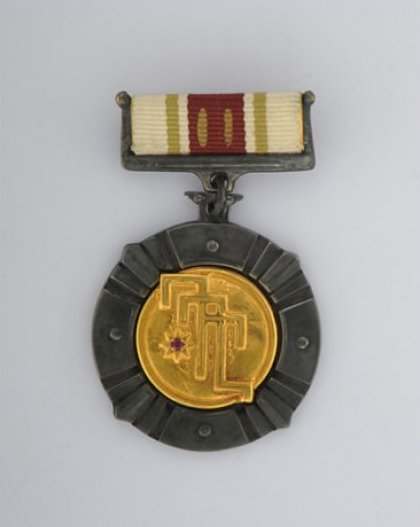
Vakhtang Gorgasali Order, rank II

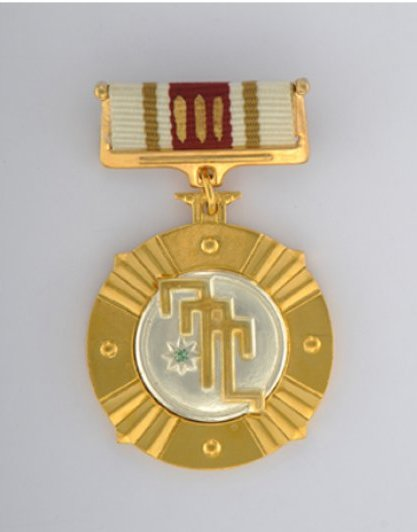
Vakhtang Gorgasali Order, rank III

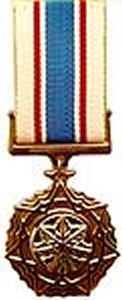
Order of Honor

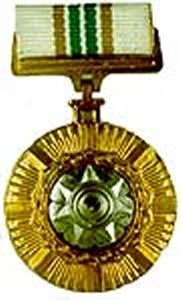
Military Courage Medal

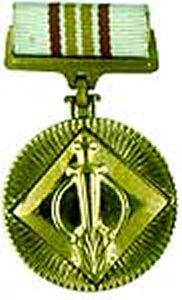
Military Honor Medal

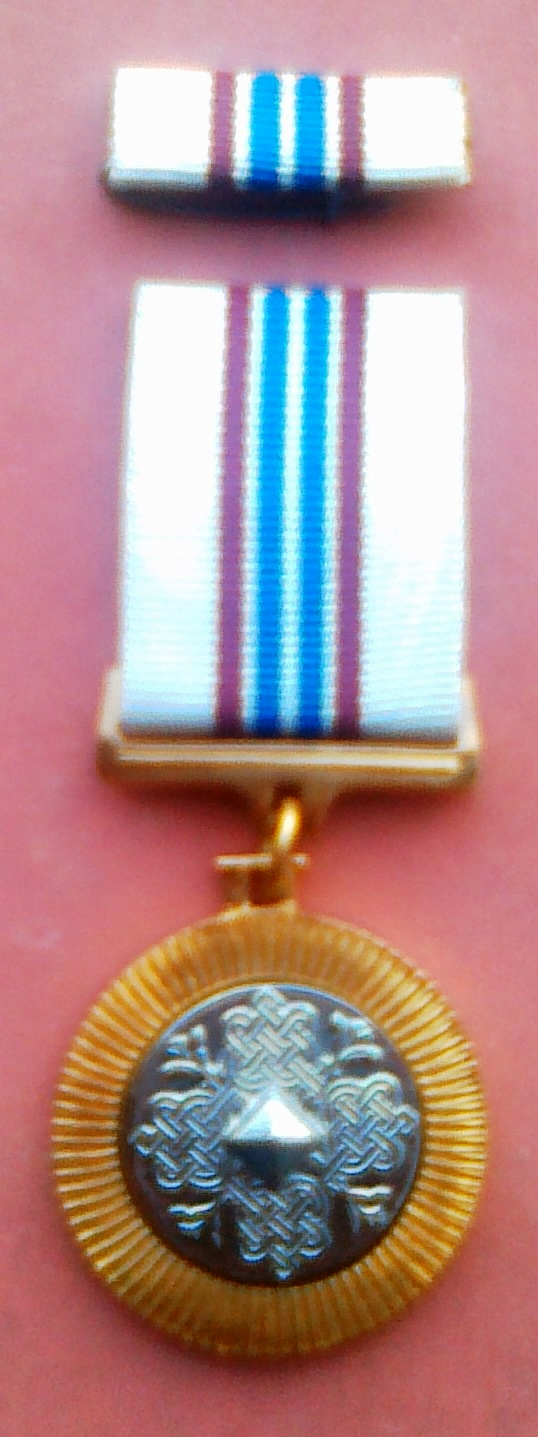
Honor Medal

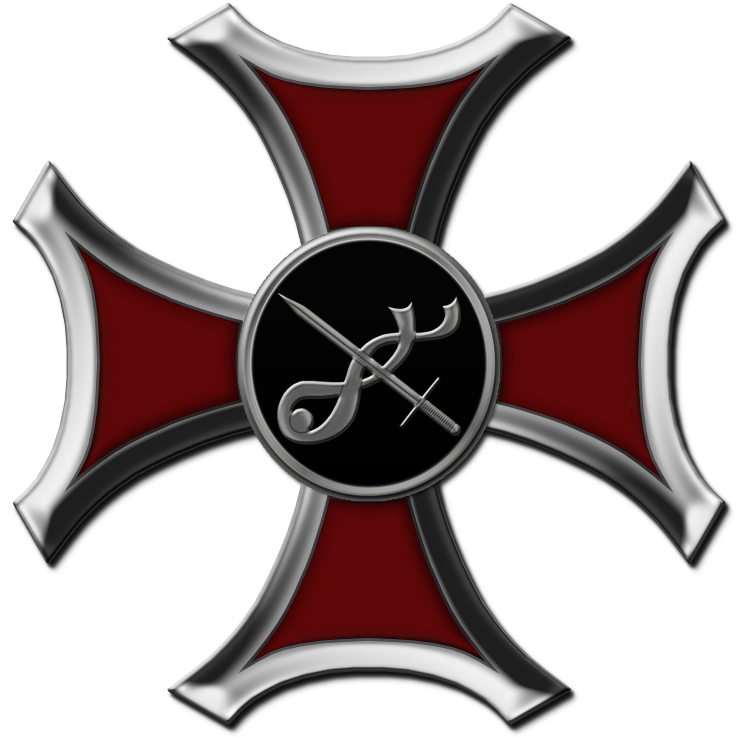
Didgori Cross

== See also ==
- List of military decorations
- List of civil awards and decorations
- Order of Queen Tamara (1918), a historic World War I-era military award
