= Order of Queen Tamara (1918) =

Georgian decoration established during the First World War

Order of Queen Tamara თამარ მეფის ორდენი
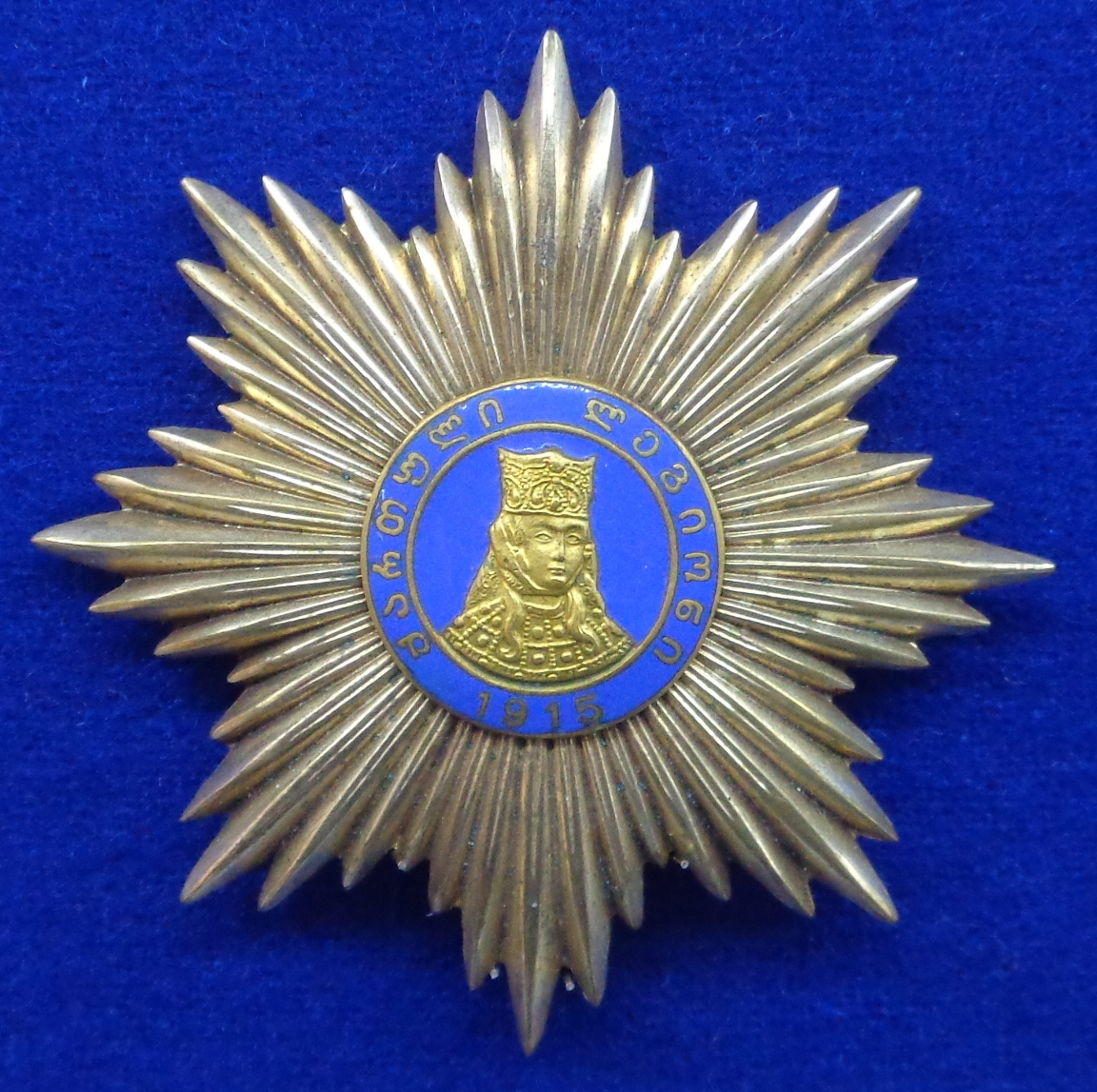
- Breast star in the Tallinn Museum of Orders

Awarded by Committee of Independent Georgia Democratic Republic of Georgia (1918) Royal House of Georgia (from 1942)
- Type: Civil and military decoration
- Established: 1915; 1918 (recognised as a state award); 1942 (restored under the Royal House)
- Royal house: Royal House of Georgia (from 1942)
- Founder: Committee of Independent Georgia
- Grand Master: Prince David Bagration of Mukhrani (since 2008)

The Order of Queen Tamara (Georgian: თამარ მეფის ორდენი) was a Georgian decoration instituted in 1915 by the Georgian independence committee to recognise service to the cause of Georgian independence. (Note: In a 1957 study, David Marshall Lang instead attributed the institution of the order to General Friedrich Kress von Kressenstein.) It became a state award of the Democratic Republic of Georgia in 1918. Later revivals include the Order of Saint Queen Tamar awarded by the Royal House of Bagrationi-Mukhrani.

== History ==
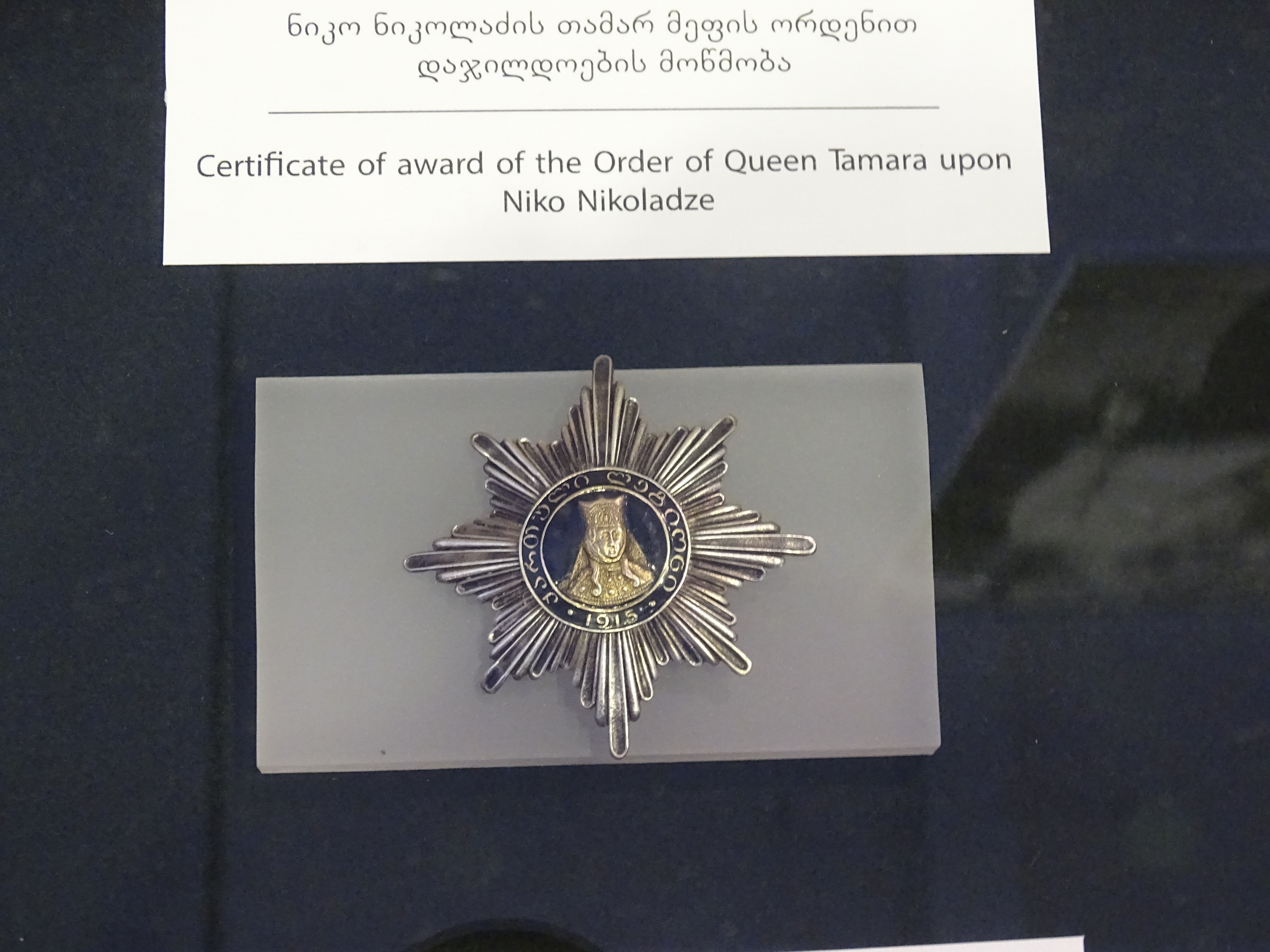
Niko Nikoladze's insignia in the Georgian National Museum

The committee worked with Germany during the First World War and helped form the Georgian Legion in Ottoman territory. It introduced the decoration to encourage the legionaries, but also awarded it to civilians. An award initially required the consent of two-thirds of the committee's members. At its final meeting in Berlin on 21 July 1918, the committee transferred this authority to its presidium.

On 13 December 1918, Zakaria Mdivani, the acting minister of war of the Democratic Republic of Georgia, issued a decree extending the award to German servicemen who had remained in Georgia after 4 November and had rendered service to the Georgian state.

Recipients included Niko Nikoladze, Leo Kereselidze, Davit Vachnadze, Memed Abashidze, Paul von Hindenburg, and Erich Ludendorff. Nikoladze's award was made in Berlin on 9 June 1918; historian Otar Janelidze subsequently located its certificate in archival material.

== Classes and insignia ==
The historical decoration initially had two classes; a third was added later. Its badge was an eight-pointed star with a central portrait of Queen Tamar and the Georgian inscription ქართული ლეგიონი 1915 ("Georgian Legion, 1915"). Niko Javakhishvili describes the three classes as follows:

Class	Description
First class	Silver star; two rows of brilliants around the central medallion
Second class	Silver star; one row of brilliants around the central medallion
Third class	Usually bronze; no brilliants around the medallion

Examples were made by several manufacturers in Berlin and Brussels, with differences in their design.

== Later revivals ==
The Georgian Encyclopedia records a revival of the decoration in 1941 within the Georgian Legion serving alongside Germany during the Second World War.

The International Commission on Orders of Chivalry records a dynastic revival by Prince Irakli Bagration of Mukhrani in 1942, following a petition from the Union of Georgian Traditionalists. After Irakli's death, the order became inactive under his son Giorgi (Jorge) Bagrationi. Prince David Bagration of Mukhrani renewed the order on 23 May 2008.

The Royal House identifies the grand masters of its revival as:

- Irakli Bagration of Mukhrani (1942–1977)
- Giorgi (Jorge) Bagrationi (1977–2008)
- David Bagration of Mukhrani (2008–present)

The Royal House's current regulations list four grades and their insignia:

Grade	Insignia
Knight or Dame Grand Collar	Collar
Senator of the Grand Badge	Gold Grand Badge and miniature
Knight or Dame of the Grand Badge	Silver Grand Badge and miniature
Esquire	Medal and miniature with a blue ribbon

A separate state Order of Queen Tamara was established in 2009. Its regulations provide for awards to women for exceptional service to the country and distinguished state or public activity.

== See also ==
- Orders, decorations, and medals of Georgia
- Order of the Eagle of Georgia
