= Salia =

Salia may refer to:

- Sini (moth), a genus of moths in the family Erebidae
- Salia, a character in the Star Trek: The Next Generation episode "The Dauphin"
- Sáile, a village in County Mayo, Ireland

== People ==
- Edward Salia (1952–2009), Ghanaian politician
- Flavius Salia (fl. 4th century), Roman consul
- Kalistrat Salia (1901–1986), Georgian historian and philologist
- Nino Salia (1898–1992), Georgian historian and philologist
- Salia Jusu-Sheriff (1929–2009), Sierra Leonean politician
