= Leo Kereselidze =

Georgian general

- ლეო კერესელიძე
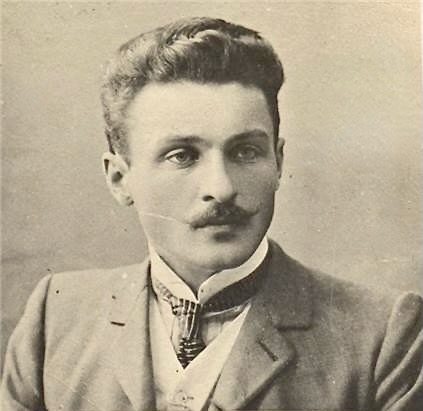
- Born: 1885; Tbilisi, Georgia (then part of the Russian Empire)
- Died: 23 November 1943 (aged 57–58); Berlin, Nazi Germany
- Military career
- Allegiance: Democratic Republic of Georgia
- Rank: General
- Conflicts: World War I Armeno-Georgian War; Georgian–Ossetian conflict

Leo Kereselidze (Georgian: ლეო კერესელიძე; 1885 – 23 November 1943), also known as Leon Kereselidze, was a Georgian military figure, politician and journalist who served as one of the leaders in the Georgian national liberation movement against the Russian and later Soviet rule. For several decades, he led a full spectrum of subversive activities against the Russians, including weapons smuggling, participation in anti-Russian military campaigns, publication of pro-Georgian independence literature, and even robbery of state treasury to finance the aforementioned work.

Pursued by the Russian authorities, Kereselidze continued his work in exile, becoming a member of the Georgian Legion and the Committee of Independent Georgia, until returning to his homeland following the proclamation of Georgian independence in 1918. He was an older brother of Jason Kereselidze, a national hero of Georgia.

== Biography ==
=== Early life and youth ===
Kereselidze was born to Georgian parents, Mate Kereselidze and Maryam Kancheli. According to Mikheil Tsereteli's account in Bedi Kartlisa, Georgian patriotism was instilled early on in the Kereselidze household and the "sons brought from their father's house the duty to fight for their homeland, a burning love for it".

Starting in 1900, he joined the youth movement for Georgia's independence and in 1905 became a member of the Georgian Socialist-Federalist Revolutionary Party, a Georgian nationalist party, and participated in secret operations to import weapons. In contrast to the moderate faction of the Federalist Revolutionary Party, which included the likes of Samson Dadiani, Kereselidze would become a leader in the party's military wing.

Kereselidze became involved in the Russian Revolution of 1905, facilitating import of illicit Western European weapons and printing equipment for Georgian rebels, and took part in battles against the Russian army of General Alikhanov in Guria and Batumi.

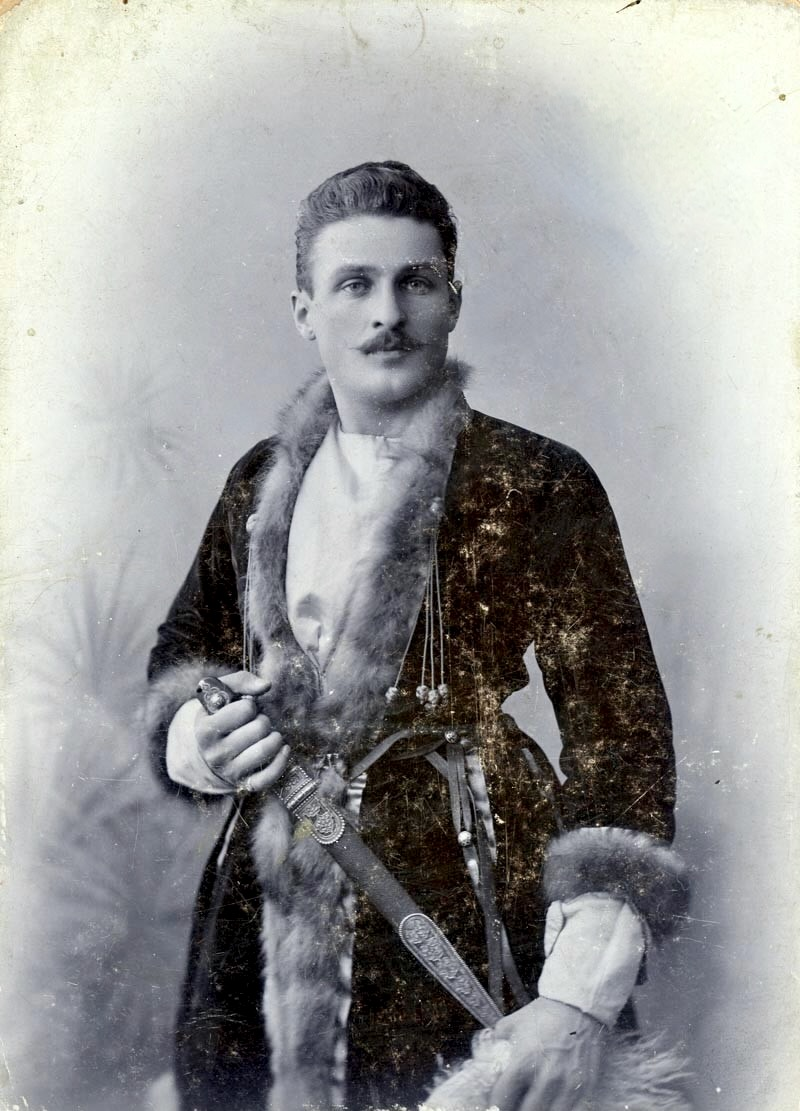
Kereselidze in traditional attire

=== Dusheti treasury heist and exile ===
On 12 April 1906 (OS), Kereselidze and his associates from the Georgian Federalist Revolutionary Party organized a robbery of the Dusheti treasury, stealing 315,000 rubles from the Russian Imperial authorities so that they could finance pro-Georgian revolutionary activities. Due to their involvement in this robbery, Leo and his brother George became fugitives from the Russian police and escaped to Geneva, Switzerland. At least some of the money stayed with Kereselidze, who allegedly took it with him as he went into exile. The rest of the funds were disbursed to the moderate wing of the party and largely spent on publishing literature. However, not everyone within the party was happy with how the funds were distributed, which was apparently what led to the organizers being reported to the Tsarist gendarmerie in Tiflis.

After Kereselidze brothers escaped to Switzerland, Russian diplomats approached the Swiss authorities with a request to arrest and extradite them to face prosecution in Russia. Leo, George, and their associate Nestor Magalashvili were initially arrested in Geneva but the Swiss Federal Tribunal ultimately acquitted them on February 12, 1907 after defendants successfully argued that Russia's case against them was politically motivated and took place with the backdrop of violent repressions. During the trial, legal scholar Ernest Nys was among the experts who testified on the legality of Russia's annexation of Georgia starting in 1801 in violation of the Treaty of Georgievsk. Kereselidze recalled that during the court hearings "everyone knew of Georgia’s right to fight Russia with weapons and all other means to restore independence".

After settling in Switzerland, Kereselidze pursued a Ph.D. degree at the University of Geneva. At the same time, Leo and his brother George supported pro-Georgian independence publications, editing a Geneva-based Georgian newspaper Tavisupali Sakartvelo (“Free Georgia”) from 1913 to 1914, and later working for a Berlin-based Kartuli Gazeti (“Georgian Newspaper”) from 1916 to 1918.

=== World War I, Georgian independence, and another exile ===
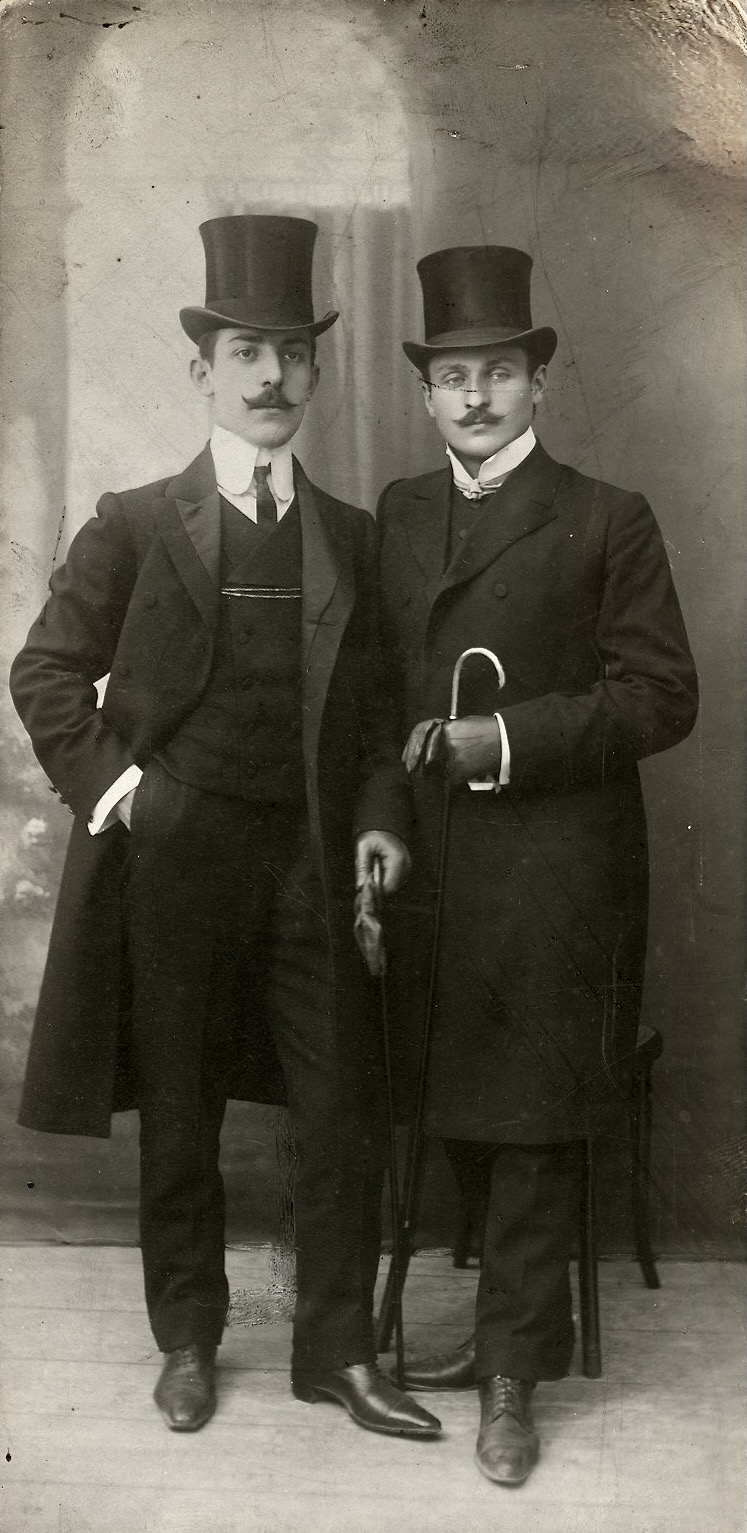
Leo and his brother George photographed in Tiflis, Georgia, pre-1906

Shortly after the breakout of World War I, Kereselidze approached Gisbert von Romberg (1866-1939), German ambassador to Switzerland, and requested German support for Georgia's independence. Starting a revolution in the Caucasus was framed as a means of going after Russia, an enemy of Germany, which interested the German side. Soon the Committee of Independent Georgia was founded, with Kereselidze becoming one of its early members.

During WWI, Kereselidze led a military unit of Georgian volunteers, the Georgian Legion, which fought on the German side and was transferred to the Ottoman–Russian Caucasus front. Kereselidze tried but failed to find common ground with the German-allied Ottoman Empire and he refused to accept Ottoman suzerainty over a potentially independent Georgia. He was subsequently promoted to major general, but the Legion was eventually disbanded due to ongoing disagreement with the Ottoman government. Kereselidze was then involved in diplomacy between Georgians and Germans, and staging subversions against the Russian troops.

After the collapse of the Russian armies in the Caucasus, Kereselidze's lifelong dream became a reality with the proclamation of Georgian independence in May 1918. He was able to return to his homeland and, along with numerous other members of the now-defunct Georgian Legion, joined the armed forces of the Democratic Republic of Georgia.

The 1921 Red Army invasion of Georgia forced him into exile to Germany where he was among the founding members and a secretary general of the right-leaning nationalist organization Tetri Giorgi.

In 1923, Kereselidze's younger brother, Jason Kereselidze, who had stayed behind in Georgia, was executed by the Soviets.

=== Final years ===
Not long before his death, Kereselidze helped establish a new political organization of Georgian émigrés, the Union of Georgian Traditionalists. His revolutionary career is the subject of a fictionalized biography Unending Battle (London, 1934) by the British army officer and writer Harold Courtenay Armstrong (1891–1943).

On November 23, 1943, during one of the Allied bombings of Berlin, a shell hit the house in which Leo Kereselidze lived, killing him along with numerous other residents. His unique library and personal archive also perished. One manuscript survived, titled "For what purpose did Georgia seek Russian rule? The history of the Georgian uprising against Russian rule during the first quarter of the 19th century. March–May, 1929. Nice".

Kereselidze was survived by one daughter, Maryam. There is a street named after him in Tbilisi.

== See also ==
- Samson Dadiani
- Jason Kereselidze
- Konstantine Andronikashvili
