= Georges Charachidzé =

French-Georgian scholar (1930–2010)

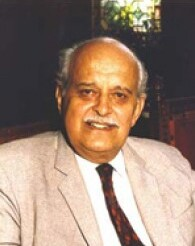
Georges Charachidzé

Georges Charachidzé (Giorgi Sharashidze; Georgian: გიორგი შარაშიძე) (February 11, 1930 – February 20, 2010) was a French-Georgian scholar of the Caucasian cultures. His most important works focused on the history of Georgian feudalism, pagan religious beliefs of the Georgians as well as the Caucasian comparative mythology and the North Caucasian languages.

== Family ==
Georges Charachidzé was born into the Georgian émigré community of Paris. His father David Sharashidze (French: Charachidzé; 1886–1935) was a journalist and a member of the Constituent Assembly of Georgia before being forced to leave his homeland following the Soviet takeover of Georgia in 1921. Sentenced to death by the Soviet government, Charachidzé had moved to Paris, where he had married a young French teacher, who gave birth to Georges Charachidzé in 1930.

== Career ==
Georges Charachidzé grew up speaking both Georgian and French. In 1953, he obtained the supervision of Georges Dumézil, a leading French scholar of the Caucasus, for his doctoral thesis, which was published, in 1968, as his first book Le système religieux de la Géorgie païenne ("The religious system of pagan Georgia"). In 1965, he accompanied Dumézil to Turkey for a field-work study of the Caucasian communities, descending from the 19th-century refugees of the Russian conquest wars in the Caucasus. While in Turkey, he assisted Dumézil in the reconstruction of the vanishing Ubykh language and in recording its last living speaker, Tevfik Esenç, who died in 1992.

Charachidzé produced several studies on the pagan religious systems of the Georgians and other Caucasians, the Georgian feudalism, the Avar grammar, Ubykh texts, and the Indo-European–Caucasian interaction. Charachidzé was a regular contributor to the long-running, Paris-based journal for Caucasian studies Bedi Kartlisa, founded and sponsored by the Georgian émigrés Kalistrat Salia and Nino Salia. In 1985, Charachidzé, together with Dumézil, founded the successor journal Revue des Etudes Géorgiennes et Caucasiennes. Charachidzé taught Georgian at the Institut national des langues et civilisations orientales from 1965 to 1998. He served as the president of the Société de Linguistique de Paris in 1984. He was also a member of the Académie des Inscriptions et Belles-Lettres. Georges Charachidzé died in Paris in 2010.

== Bibliography ==
Some of the most important works by Charachidzé are:

- Charachidzé, G. 1960. Travail et mort dans la montagne géorgienne. L’Ethnographie 54: 45-62.
- Charachidzé, Georges. 1968. Le système religieux de la Géorgie païenne: analyse structurale d’une civilisation. Paris: Maspero.
- Charachidzé, Georges. 1971. Introduction à l’étude de la féodalité géorgienne: le Code de Georges le Brillant. Paris: Librairie Droz.
- Charachidzé, Georges. 1979. L’aigle en clé d’eau: un exemple d’inversion conservante. La fonction symbolique. Michel Izard & Pierre Smith, eds. Paris: Gallimard, pp 83–104.
- Charachidzé, G. 1981. "Géorgie. La religion et les mythes des Géorgiens de la montagne." Dictionnaire des mythologies et des religions des sociétés traditionnelles et du monde antique. (ed. Yves Bonnefoy). Vol 1, pp 451–459. Paris: Flammarion.
- Charachidzé, G. 1981. "Arménie. La religion et les mythes." Dictionnaire des mythologies et des religions des sociétés traditionnelles et du monde antique. (ed. Yves Bonnefoy). Vol 1, pp 67–69. Paris: Flammarion.
- Charachidzé, G.. 1981. "Caucase du Nord." Dictionnaire des mythologies et des religions des so-ciétés traditionnelles et du monde antique. (ed. Y. Bonnefoy). Vol 1, pp 129–132. Flammarion.
- Charachidzé, G. 1981. "Les Ossètes." Dictionnaire des mythologies et des religions des sociétés traditionnelles et du monde antique. (ed. Y. Bonnefoy). Vol 2, pp 215–218. Paris: Flammarion.
- Charachidzé, G. 1986. Prométhée ou le Caucase. Paris: Flammarion.
- Charachidzé, G. 1987. La mémoire indo-européenne du Caucase. Paris: Hachette.
