= Georgian Legion =

Georgian Legion may refer to:

- Georgian Legion (1915–1918), a World War I unit in the German army composed of Georgians
- Georgian Legion (1941–1945), a World War II unit in the German army composed of Georgians
- Georgian Legion (Ukraine), a pro-Ukrainian unit in the Russo-Ukrainian War.
