= Kartvelian =

Kartvelian may refer to:

- Anything coming from or related to Georgia (country)
  - Kartvelian languages
  - Kartvelian alphabet, see Georgian alphabet
  - Kartvelian studies
  - Georgians

== See also ==
- Kartvelia (disambiguation)
- Kartli, region in eastern Georgia etymon of Kartvelian and Kartvelia
