= Gertrud Pätsch =

German ethnologist and philologist

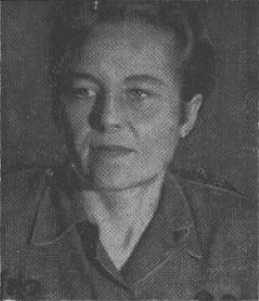
Pätsch in 1948

Gertrud Pätsch (born 22 January 1910 in Hannover as Gertrud Kettler; died 14 December 1994 in Jena) was a German ethnologist and philologist, who rendered service in the area of Kartvelian studies.

In 1937, she graduated in Munster with a degree in the Old Georgian language. After the Second World War she left the western sector of Germany for East Berlin, where she earned a habilitation at the Humboldt University of Berlin in Indonesian linguistics. She taught in Berlin until she moved to the Friedrich Schiller University in Jena in 1960, where she founded the Kartvelologian faculty. After her retirement she worked for two years at the Tbilisi State University in Georgia. She published books and many articles in journals, such as Bedi Kartlisa. Revue de Kartvélologie. Towards the end of her life, Pätsch translated many pieces of Georgian literature, such as Shota Rustaveli's poem "The Knight in the Panther's Skin". She worked diligently for cultural exchanges between the German Democratic Republic and Georgia. She even had the Georgian alphabet engraved in the stairwell of her home in Jena, where she also had built a guest house for such visitors as Konstantine Gamsakhurdia.
