= Vasil Tsereteli =

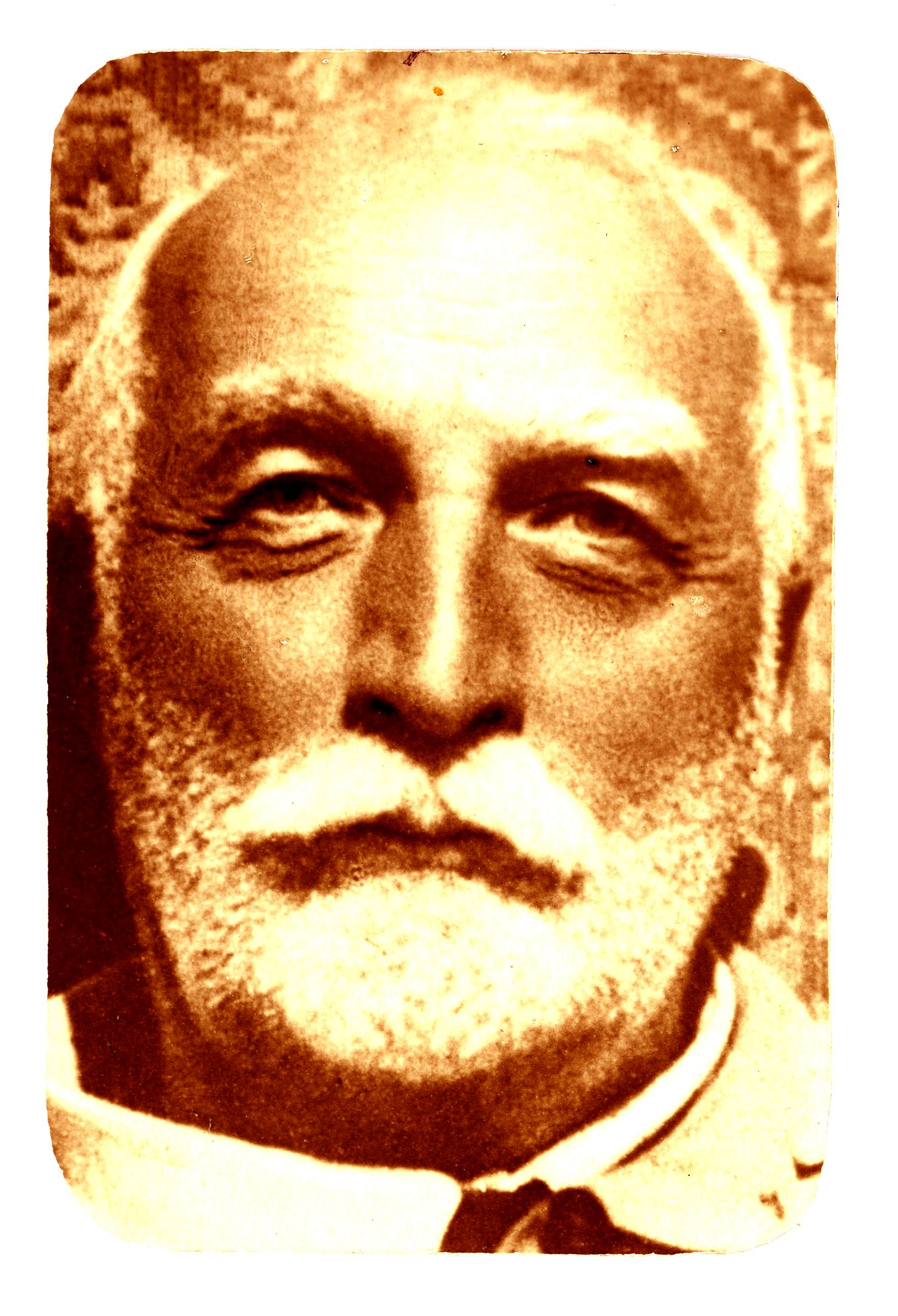
Vasil Tsereteli (1936)

Vasil Tsereteli (Georgian: ვასილ წერეთელი; 1862–1937) was a distinguished Georgian medical doctor, journalist, politician and public benefactor.

== Biography ==
Tsereteli was born in the village of Tskhrukveti, in the Chiatura district of Imereti region in Western Georgia, into the family of Prince Giorgi Tsereteli. His brother was Professor Mikheil Tsereteli, a famous Georgian historian and public benefactor. His son Giorgi Tsereteli was a distinguished orientalist, Academician of the Georgian Academy of Sciences, his daughter Tinatin Tsereteli was also a famous scientist (jurist) and a Corresponding Member of the Georgian Academy of Sciences.

In 1882 Tsereteli graduated from the Classical Gymnasium in Kutaisi and in 1898 from the Medical Faculty of the Kiev University (Ukraine). He worked as doctor in Chiatura, Tianeti, and Kutaisi until 1926. In Kutaisi he taught hygiene in a Georgian Gymnasium. In 1898 he established the Clinic in Chiatura.

From 1888 onward, he was an active collaborator and author of the main Georgian newspaper Iveria of Ilia Chavchavadze. In the 1910s Tsereteli edited the Georgian newspapers of national-democratic direction Samshoblo and Chveni Qvekana. From 1887 to 1893 he was editor of the Russian newspaper Chernomorski Vestnik in Batumi.

From 1904 to 1916 Tsereteli was a member of the Georgian Social-Federalist Party. In 1917 he was one of the founders of the Georgian National-Democratic Party. From 1917 to 1919 Tsereteli was a member of the "National Council of Georgia", and from 1919 to 1921 he was a member of the Constituent Assembly of the Democratic Republic of Georgia (DRG). On May 26, 1918, he signed the "Act of Independence of Georgia".

Tsereteli lived in Tbilisi from 1926 until his death. Between 1926 and 1930 he was an editor-in-chief of the Georgian medical journal Jansakhkomis Moambe.

Tsereteli died in 1937 in Tbilisi.
