= Kartvelia =

Kartvelia may refer to:

- Georgia, a country in the Caucasus, known as "Sakartvelo" in Georgian, literally translated as "Kartvelia" in English
- 781 Kartvelia, a minor planet orbiting the Sun named after Georgia

== See also ==
- Kartvelian (disambiguation)
- Kartli, region in eastern Georgia, etymon of Kartvelian and Kartvelia
