= Howard Isaac Aronson =

Howard Isaac Aronson (5 March 1936 – 26 October 2024) was an American linguist, professor at the University of Chicago. He was a specialist in general linguistics and Slavic languages and a scholar of Kartvelian and Jewish studies.

In 1956, Aronson earned a BA degree from the University of Illinois. In 1958, he received a MA from Indiana University. In 1961, he received a Doctor of Science degree in Slavic linguistics from the same university. His doctoral thesis dealt with morphophonemic patterns of inflection in the Bulgarian language.

Aronson published multiple works of research of Georgian language, including Georgian: A Reading Grammar (1982) and numerous journal articles.
