= Harold Courtenay Armstrong =

British sea captain and historian (1890–1943)

H. C. Armstrong
- Born: October 20, 1890
- Died: August 25, 1943 (aged 52); Brighton, England
- Occupation: Writer
- Writing career
- Period: 20th century
- Genre: History

Francis Harold Courtenay Lupin Armstrong (20 October 1890 – 25 August 1943), commonly known as Harold Courtenay Armstrong or H. C. Armstrong, was a British sea captain and historian.

== Biography ==
During World War I Armstrong was captured by the Turks in the Siege of Kut, where he subsequently was forced to march to Turkey as a prisoner of war. Following a failed escape Armstrong was imprisoned for six months. Following his release from prison, he was appointed Staff Officer for all prisoners of war. In a notably, he served as both prosecutor and interpreter during Turkish courts-martial proceedings against prisoner of war camp commanders accused of mistreating prisoners.

== Bibliography ==
- Turkey in Travail: The Birth of a New Nation (1925)
- The Mosque of the Roses (1927), novel
- Turkey and Syria Reborn (1930)
- Grey Wolf, Mustafa Kemal: An Intimate Study of a Dictator (1932), a fictionalized biography of Mustafa Kemal Atatürk
- Tales of Hazard (1932)
- On the Run: Escaping Tales (1934)
- Unending Battle (1934), a fictionalized biography of Leo Kereselidze
- Lord of Arabia: Ibn Saud: An Intimate Study of a King (1934), a biography of Ibn Saud
- Grey Steel, J. C. Smuts: A Study in Arrogance (1937), a biography of Jan Smuts
