= Treaty of Poti =

1918 treaty between the German Empire and the Democratic Republic of Georgia

- Type: Bilateral treaty
- Signed: 28 May 1918
- Location: Poti, Georgia
- Signatories: Democratic Republic of Georgia; German Empire

The Treaty of Poti was a bilateral agreement between the German Empire and the Democratic Republic of Georgia in which the latter accepted German protection and recognition. The agreement was signed, on 28 May 1918, by General Otto von Lossow for Germany and by Foreign Minister Akaki Chkhenkeli for Georgia. Concluded at the Georgian Black Sea port of Poti, the treaty came only two days after Georgia proclaimed independence, becoming the newly independent republic's first-ever international treaty.

== Background ==
On 9 March 1917 the Special Transcaucasian Committee was established, with Member of the State Duma V. A. Kharlamov as Chairman, to replace the Imperial Viceroy Grand Duke Nicholas Nikolaevich of Russia (1856–1929) on the Caucasian front by the Russian Provisional Government in Transcaucasia as the highest organ of civil administration. Akaki Chkhenkeli of Georgia was its member. In November 1917, the first government of independent Transcaucasia was created in Tbilisi as the "Transcaucasian Commissariat (Transcaucasian Sejm)" which replaced the "Transcaucasian Committee" following the Bolshevik seizure of power in St. Petersburg. It was headed by Georgian Menshevik Nikolay Chkheidze.

On 5 December 1917 the armistice of Erzincan was signed between the Russians and Ottomans in Erzincan, ending the armed conflict between Russia and the Ottoman Empire in the Persian Campaign and Caucasus Campaign of the Middle Eastern theatre of World War I. On 3 March 1918 the armistice of Erzincan followed up with the Treaty of Brest-Litovsk marking Russia's exit from World War I.

Between 14 March and April 1918 the Trabzon peace conference held among the Ottoman Empire and the delegation of the Transcaucasian Diet (Transcaucasian Sejm). Enver Pasha offered to surrender all ambitions in the Caucasus in return for recognition of the Ottoman reacquisition of the east Anatolian provinces at Brest-Litovsk at the end of the negotiations. On 5 April the head of the Transcaucasian delegation Akaki Chkhenkeli accepted the Treaty of Brest-Litovsk as a basis for more negotiations and wired the governing bodies urging them to accept this position. The mood prevailing in Tiflis was very different. Tiflis acknowledged the existence of a state of war between themselves and the Ottoman Empire. Hostilities resumed and the Ottoman troops overran new lands to the east, reaching pre-war levels.

Leading Georgian politicians viewed an alliance with Germany as the only way to prevent Georgia from being occupied by the Ottoman Empire. After the failed peace conference, the armed conflicts started. On the other hand, Germany was quite ready to exploit the situation to secure its position amid the ongoing war and growing German-Turkish rivalry for Caucasian influence and resources, notably the oilfields at Baku on the Caspian and the associated rail and pipeline connection to Batumi on the Black Sea (Baku-Batumi pipeline).

== Treaty ==
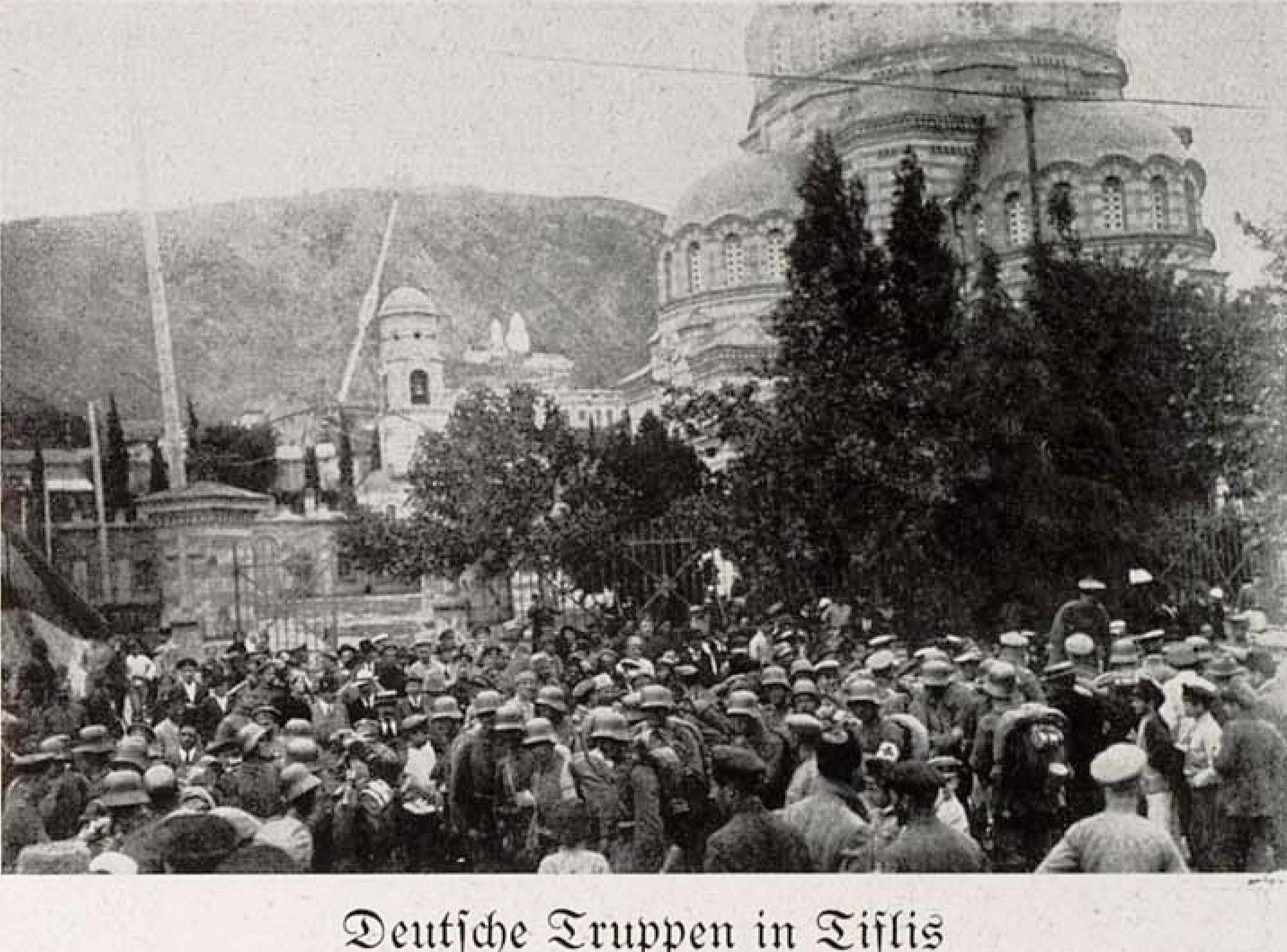
German troops in Tiflis, Georgia, 1918.

On 28 May the treaty was signed. It was just two days after the proclamation of the independence of Georgia on 26 May 1918, and four days after the fruitless German-mediated peace conference between the Ottoman and Transcaucasian governments was closed in Batumi on 24 May 1918. Encouraged by the German mission led by Friedrich Freiherr Kress von Kressenstein and Friedrich Werner von der Schulenburg, Georgia withdrew from the federation and declared itself a separate republic. In a desperate quest for an ally and facing a renewed Turkish offensive, the Georgian ministers immediately hurried to Poti where a German delegation headed by Count von Lossow were waiting aboard S.S. Minna Horn. A provisional treaty was signed at Poti on 28 May. Georgia was to receive recognition and protection from Imperial Germany. The convention provided among other things for Germany to have free and unrestricted use of Georgia’s railways and all ship available in Georgian ports, for the occupation of strategic points by German expeditionary forces, the free circulation of German currency in Georgia, the establishment of a joint German-Georgian mining corporation, and the exchange of diplomatic and consular representatives. In a secret supplementary letter, von Lossow promised to help in securing Georgia’s international recognition and safeguarding its territorial integrity.

== Aftermath ==
The German-Georgian cooperation, however unequal and short-lived, proved to be highly beneficial for the young Georgian republic and contributed to its survival in the turbulent year of 1918. On 11 May a new peace conference opened at Batumi. At this conference the Ottomans extended their demands to include Tiflis as well as Alexandropol and Echmiadzin through which they wanted to build a railroad to connect Kars and Julfa with Baku. The Armenian and Georgian members of the Republic’s delegation began to stall. Beginning on 21 May, the Ottoman army moved ahead once again. The conflict led to the Battle of Sardarapat (21–29 May), the Battle of Kara Killisse (1918) (24–28 May) and the Battle of Bash Abaran (21–24 May). On 4 June the Democratic Republic of Armenia was forced to sign the Treaty of Batum.

The German mission left for Constanţa, taking with it a Georgian delegation composed of Chkhenkeli, Zurab Avalishvili, and Niko Nikoladze, who were entrusted by the Government of Georgia with negotiating a final treaty in Berlin. Protracted negotiations ensued, only to be rendered abortive by the military defeat of Germany in November 1918.
