= German Caucasus expedition =

Expedition in the Caucasus by Germany

German Caucasus Expeditions
- Part of the Caucasus campaign in the Middle Eastern theatre of World War I
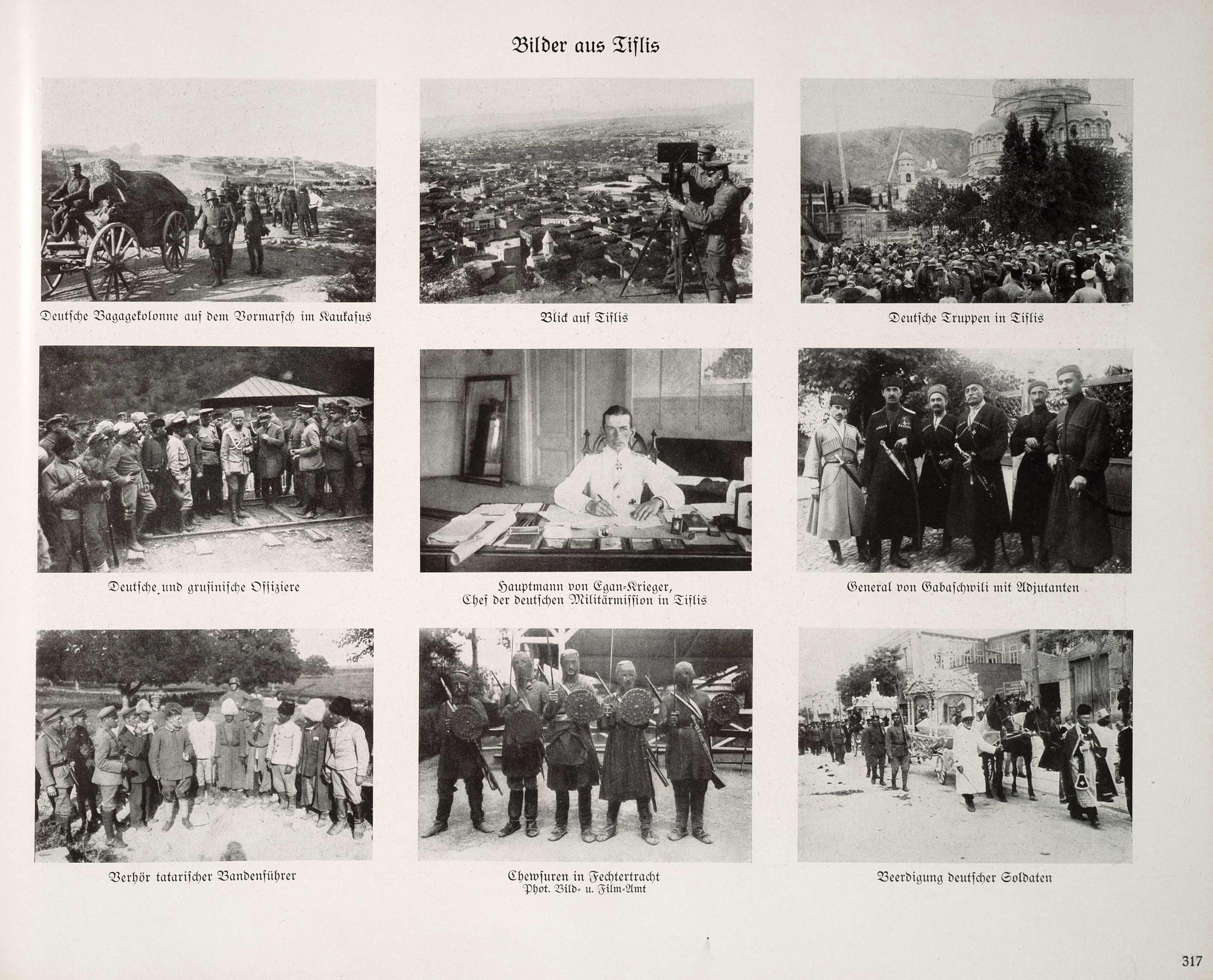
- German Expeditionary Force in Tiflis
Date	8 June – October 1918
Location	South Caucasus
Result	Inconclusive
Territorial changes	Turkish advance Into the Democratic Republic of Georgia stalled temporarily. German advance into Baku prevented.

Belligerents
Ottoman Empire	Germany (Democratic Republic of Georgia) Georgia; Supported by: Austria-Hungary

Commanders and leaders
Enver Pasha; Wehib Pasha	F. K. von Kressenstein (Democratic Republic of Georgia) Giorgi Kvinitadze (Democratic Republic of Georgia) Ilia Odishelidze

Units involved
Third Army; Islamic Army of the Caucasus	7th Bavarian Cavalry Brigade; 7th and 9th Jager Battalions of 29th Bavarian Infantry Regiment; 10th Sturm Battalion; A machine gun detachment 176th Mortar Company (Democratic Republic of Georgia) Regular army

Strength
Uncertain	3,000

Casualties and losses
Uncertain	Only in June: 4+ killed 12+ seriously wounded 51+ captured

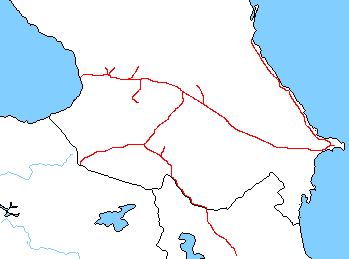
Transcaucasus Railway in 1916

The German Caucasus expedition was a military expedition sent in late May 1918, by the German Empire to the formerly Russian Transcaucasia during the Caucasus Campaign of World War I. Its prime aim was to stabilize the pro-German Democratic Republic of Georgia and to secure oil supplies for Germany by preventing the Ottoman Empire from gaining access to the oil reserves near Baku on the Absheron Peninsula. Ottoman forces advancing in the Caucasus clashed with German forces operating in Georgia, provoking an open conflict.

== Background ==
On December 5, 1917, the Armistice of Erzincan was signed by Russians and Ottomans, ending the armed conflicts between Russia and the Ottoman Empire in the Caucasus Campaign of the Middle Eastern theatre of World War I. The Committee of Union and Progress moved to win the friendship of the Bolsheviks with the signing of the Ottoman-Russian friendship treaty (January 1, 1918). On January 11, 1918, the special decree On Armenia was signed by Lenin and Stalin which armed and repatriated over 100,000 Armenians from the former Tsar's Army to be sent to the Caucasus for operations against Ottoman interests. On January 20, 1918, Talaat Pasha entered an official protest against the Bolsheviks arming Armenian army legions and replied, "the Russian leopard had not changed its spots." Bolsheviks and Armenians would take the place of Nikolai Nikolayevich Yudenich's Russian Caucasus Army.

On March 3, 1918, the Armistice of Erzincan was followed by the Treaty of Brest-Litovsk marking Russia's exit from World War I. Between March 14 - April 1918 the Trabzon peace conference was held between the Ottoman Empire and the delegation of the Transcaucasian Diet (Transcaucasian Sejm). Enver Pasha offered to surrender all Turkish ambitions in the Caucasus in return for recognition of the Ottoman reacquisition of the east Anatolian provinces at Brest-Litovsk at the end of the negotiations. The Treaty of Brest-Litovsk provided some relief to Bolsheviks who were tied up in fighting the civil war. However, the oil fields of Baku were not under control of the Russians and Germany had a high demand for oil. During March 30 to April 2, 1918, thousands of Azeris and other Muslims in the city of Baku and adjacent areas of the Baku Governorate of the Transcaucasian Democratic Federative Republic were massacred by Dashnaks with strong support from Bolshevik Soviets. This event is known as the March Days or March Events.

On April 5, the head of the Transcaucasian delegation Akaki Chkhenkeli accepted the Treaty of Brest-Litovsk as a basis for further negotiations and wired the governing bodies urging them to accept this position. The mood prevailing in Tiflis was very different. The Armenians pressured the Republic to refuse. They acknowledged the existence of a state of war between themselves and the Ottoman Empire. Hostilities resumed and Ottoman troops under Vehip Pasha overran new lands to the east, reaching pre-war frontiers.

On May 11, a new peace conference opened at Batum. At this conference the Ottomans extended their demands to include Tiflis as well as Alexandropol and Echmiadzin; they also wanted a railroad to be built to connect Kars and Julfa with Baku. The Armenian and Georgian members of the Republic's delegation began to stall. Beginning on May 21, the Ottoman army moved ahead once again. The ensuing conflict led to the Battle of Sardarapat (May 21–29), the Battle of Kara Killisse (1918) (May 24–28), and the Battle of Bash Abaran (May 21–24). On May 28, 1918, Georgia, signed the Treaty of Poti with Germany, and welcomed the prospect of a German expedition, seeing the Germans as protectors against the post-Russian Revolution havoc and the Ottoman military advances.

== Forces ==
The expedition was composed almost exclusively of Bavarian troops and included the 7th Bavarian Cavalry Brigade, reinforced by the 29th Bavarian Infantry Regiment (7th and 9th Jäger Battalions), the 10th Sturm Battalion, 1 machine-gun detachment, and the 176th Mortar Company. It was 3,000 strong and commanded by Major General Friedrich Freiherr Kress von Kressenstein. General Erich Ludendorff was also involved in supervision and organizing the expedition; he met Georgian representatives in Berlin, accompanying them to see Kaiser Wilhelm II. Besides the Georgians of the Caucasus, there were Georgians who served in the Georgian Legion of the Imperial German Army. Many of these officers and soldiers were awarded by the Georgian Order of Queen Tamar, issued specifically for the German military personnel. This force was transported by sea from the Crimea to the Georgian Black Sea port of Poti where it landed on June 8, 1918, and was later reinforced by the German troops recalled from Syria and Ukraine for service in Georgia.

The Ottoman Empire had the Third Army in the region.

== Expedition ==
=== Prelude ===
On June 4, under direct threat of the Ottoman 3rd Army, which had advanced to within 7 km of Yerevan and 10 km of Echmiadzin, the First Republic of Armenia signed the Treaty of Batum.

On June 10, the German force arrived at Tiflis, the capital of Georgia, and held a joint German-Georgian military parade in the city's main thoroughfare. The German expedition was soon joined by the former German prisoners of war in Russia and the mobilized Württemberg colonists who had settled in Georgia in the mid-19th century. Combined German-Georgian garrisons were stationed in various regions of Georgia, including Poti, Ochamchire, Kutaisi, and Borchalo.

=== The skirmish ===
The arrival of the German troops in Georgia coincided with the growing German-Turkish rivalry for Caucasian influence and resources, notably the oil fields near Baku, Democratic Republic of Azerbaijan, on the Caspian and the associated rail and pipeline connection to Batumi on the Black Sea (Baku-Batumi pipeline). Early in June 1918, the Ottoman 3rd Army under Vehip Pasha renewed its offensive on the main road to Tiflis, and confronted a joint German-Georgian force.

On June 10, the Turks attacked and took many prisoners, leading to an official threat from Berlin to withdraw its support and troops from the Ottoman Empire. Hans von Seeckt was dispatched to Georgia and met with Enver Pasha at Batumi. The Ottoman government had to concede to German pressure by sacking Vehip Pasha and halting its drive, for the moment, and further advance into Georgia for the Batumi-Tiflis-Baku railway and associated pipeline. The Ottomans reoriented their strategic direction towards Azerbaijan with a blocking action against British forces in northwestern Persia. Nuri Pasha led the drive under the Islamic Army of the Caucasus also known as the Ottoman Army of Islam. However, Enver Pasha secretly instructed his commanders to advance and use force against the Germans if necessary.

=== On the way to Baku ===
Simultaneously, two additional German divisions were moved from the Balkans and Ukraine to advance on Baku. At the same time, Germany provided financial assistance to the Bolshevik government in Moscow and offered to stop the Ottoman Army of Islam in return for guaranteed access to Baku's oil. According to the August 27 agreement between the Bolshevik government in Moscow and Germany, the latter was to receive a quarter of Baku's oil production which was sent through the Caspian Sea and up the lower Volga to German supported forces in Ukraine.

The German government requested from the Ottoman Empire to stall an offensive into Azerbaijan. Enver Pasha ignored this request. After the Battle of Baku, the Ottoman Army of Islam under Nuri Pasha, on the heels of the evacuating Soviet forces, captured the city on September 15, 1918.

The Soviet Bicherakhov detachment and the German Caucasus Expedition led by Colonel Friedrich von der Holtz met on 17 September, along with the forces of the Baku Commune who were leaving the city. Grigory Korganov was a Georgian Communist activist participating in the Battle of Baku, one of the 26 Baku Commissars and Bolshevik Party leaders in Azerbaijan during the Russian Revolution. However, a severe political crisis in Germany, which started later that month, rendered the Caucasus expedition abortive.

== German reaction to atrocities ==
[It is] deeply shameful that the war situation forced us to cooperate with such beasts like the Turks and that we could not stand up to them in a way humanity would have compelled us to do...

— Friedrich Freiherr Kress von Kressenstein (1918)

During the expedition, the Germans witnessed the massacre of 10,000–30,000 Armenians in the September Days, the Germans and the Turks almost went to war. The Germans witnessed the September Days, as well as other atrocities by Turks against Christians. Having already witnessed the Armenian genocide and its aftermath, it had become clear by 1918 that the Germans had been at the end of their rope and had unanimously become anti-Turkish.

German officer Ernst Paraquin was so enraged about the atrocities that he screamed in the face of Nuri Pasha, despite being in the presence of other Turkish officers, and held him directly responsible for the massacres. This caused Paraquin to get sacked by Turkish authorities; Halil Kut hinted to Paraquin that if he continued talking about the massacres, he would get court-martialed and hanged.

Friedrich Freiherr Kress von Kressenstein and other German military officers also felt disgusted and tried to help victims. German units offered help to Armenian refugees, while Kress von Kressenstein informed his superiors that the Turks are resolved on destroying the remnants of the Armenians by a new method: encirclement, blockage, and mass starvation. He directly appealed to the German Foreign Office, calling for direct intervention. He wrote that it is "deeply shameful that the war situation forced us to cooperate with such beasts like the Turks and that we could not stand up to them in a way humanity would have compelled us to do". He pled for the "rescue [of] half a million Christians from certain starvation" and note that "Public opinion and history would judge us guilty for the annihilation of the Armenians".

Otto von Lossow twice, in May and September, explicitly warned his superiors that Turkish military leaders were aiming at "the total extermination of the Russian Armenians in the Transcaucasus". He dismissed Turkish claims of an alleged "Armenian danger" and "military necessity measures" as nonsensical; he blamed Turkish generals Mehmet Esat Pasha, Yakup Şevki Pasha, and Nuri Pasha as responsible for the spread of that type of disinformation, used for "justifying the mass murder".

== Aftermath ==
On October 21, the German government ordered the withdrawal of all troops from the region. The last ship with German soldiers aboard departed from Poti, Georgia, on December 13, 1918. Thus, in April 1919 it became the last German military formation to return home from active service in World War I.

== Memoirs ==
The memoirs of General of Artillery Friedrich Freiherr Kress von Kressenstein were published in 2001 in the German language in Tbilisi, Georgia – Editor Dr. David Paitschadse, publishing house Samschoblo, ISBN 99928-26-62-2, online version can be found here

== See also ==
- List of states and regions involved in the Russian Civil War
- Bibliography of the Russian Revolution and Civil War
- Outline of the Russian Revolution and Civil War
