= Nino Salia =

Nino Salia née Kurtsikashvili (Georgian: ნინო სალია-ქურციკაშვილისა) (October 15, 1898 – 1992) was a Georgian émigré historian and philologist active in France, and the wife of the historian Kalistrat Salia.

Born in Kakheti, eastern Georgia, she was educated at Tbilisi and St. Petersburg. During World War I, she served as a nurse. After the Soviet takeover of Georgia, she lived in France where she, together with her husband, edited the journal Bedi Kartlisa dedicated to the Kartvelian studies. Salia published several works on the history and culture of Georgia, and coauthored "Georgia" (Historical-Cultural Review) along with K. Salia and V. Beridze. Later in her life, she presented her unique library to the Institute of Manuscripts of Georgia.
