= Nikoloz Beruchashvili =

Georgian geographer

- Born: 21 August 1947; Tbilisi, Georgia
- Died: 23 March 2006 (aged 58); Tbilisi, Georgia
- Education: Tbilisi State University
- Scientific career
- Fields: Geography

Nikoloz (Niko) Beruchashvili (Georgian: ნიკოლოზ ბერუჩაშვილი; August 21, 1947 – March 23, 2006) was a famous Georgian geographer and cartographer. Doctor of Geographical Sciences (1981), professor (1983). The Vice president of the Geographical Society of Georgia (1998–2006). He introduced into the landscape science a new term of "STEX". (Note: The states of the struqture and functioning of facies connected with seasonal rhythmicity.)

== Biography ==
In 1970 Nikoloz Beruchashvili finished the Faculty of Geography and Geology at Tbilisi State University. In 1982–2006 he was headed the chief of Cartography and Geoinformatics of Tbilisi State University. From 1979 to 2006 he was head of the scientific-research LAB studying the states of environment with aerospace methods and from 1970 until his death, he was chief Physical-Geographical Station of Martqopi. In 1995–2000 he was a professor of Soros Fund. In 2004 he was a founding chair of the International Geographical Union Commission on Landscape Analysis. In 2004–2006 he was a chair of the International Geographical Union’s Commission on Landscape Analysis. In 1981 defending his Doctor's degree at Moscow State University. He is the author of a theoretical concept of spatial-time analysis and synthesis in the landscape studies, which is introduced to the curricula of a number of universities. Beruchashvili with the Jean Radvanyi published "Geopolitical Atlas of the Caucasus" three times in the French and Georgian languages. Nikoloz Beruchashvili produced over 220 scientific works, of which 28 is monograph. Under his leadership 25 post-graduate students had maintained theses. The scientific adviser of 3 theses for a Doctor's degree. As the geographer has visited (attended) and worked in 60 various countries of the world. Nikoloz Beruchashvili was twice awarded the Order of Honor (2000, 2003).

== Works ==
- Beruchashvili, N. L. "Four dimensions of a landscape". Moscow: Mysl. 1986 (in Russian).
- Beruchashvili, N. L. "Geophysics of landscape". Moscow: Visshaya shkola, 1990 (in Russian).
- Beruchashvili, N. L. Radvanyi, Jean. "Geopolitical Atlas of the Caucasus". 1996; 1998; 2011.
