= Kartvelian studies =

Science of the Kartvelian languages

Kartvelian studies (Note: also referred as Kartvelology or Georgian studies) (Georgian: ქართველოლოგია, romanized: kartvelologia) is an interdisciplinary field of research devoted to the study of Georgia, the history, geography, culture, literature, art, languages, politics and of Georgian people in Georgia and elsewhere.

It is sometimes subsumed within the category of Caucasian studies.

== Scholars ==
=== Georgian ===
- Prince Teimuraz of Georgia (1782–1846)
- David Chubinashvili (1814–1891)
- Alexander Khakhanov (1864–1912)
- Ivane Javakhishvili (1876–1940)
- Korneli Kekelidze (1879–1962)
- Ilia Abuladze (1901–1968)
- Simon Kaukhchishvili (1895–1981)
- Giorgi Melikishvili (1918–2002)
- Irine Melikishvili (1943–2013)
- Georges Charachidzé (1930–2010)
- Merab Chukhua (born 1964)

=== International ===
- Johann Christoph Adelung
- Jacob Georg Christian Adler
- William Edward David Allen
- Howard Isaac Aronson
- Julius Aßfalg
- Hajnalka Babirák
- Bruno Baumgartner
- Roland Bielmeier
- Robert Pierpont Blake
- Jean-Désiré Blankoff
- Timothy K. Blauvelt
- Robert Bleichsteiner
- Eugene Bolkhovitinov
- Jan Braun
- Gundolf Bruchhaus
- Moris Brierre
- Marie-Félicité Brosset
- Gustavo Alfredo de la Torre Botarro
- Georges Bouillon
- Hermann Buddensieg
- Jean Chardin
- Teramo Castelli
- Václav A. Černý
- Harun Çimke
- Lyn Coffin
- Gerhard Deeters
- Farshid Delshad
- Georges Dumézil
- Ernst Emsheimer
- Michel Van Esbroeck
- Heinz Fähnrich
- Leah Flury
- Gérard Garitte
- Jost Gippert
- Yvette Grimaud
- Lyudmila Grytsik
- Karl von Hahn
- Alice Harris
- Thomas Häusermann
- Brian George Hewitt
- Mykola Hudziy
- Mykola Hulak
- Jaromír Jedlička
- Michael Job
- Stephen F. Jones
- Steffi Chotiwari-Jünger
- Mine Kadiroğlu
- Muzaffer Kir
- Georgi Klimov
- Yasuhiro Kojima
- René Lafon
- Arcangelo Lamberti
- David Marshall Lang
- Arthur Leist
- Constantine B. Lerner
- Hirotake Maeda
- Luigi Magarotto
- Francesco Maria Maggio
- Yolanda Marchev
- Richard Meckelein
- Aleksey Muravyov
- Solomon Caesar Malan
- William Morfill
- Ruth Neukomm
- Tatyana Nikolskaya
- Bernard Outtier
- Gül Mükerrem Öztürk
- Gertrud Pätsch
- Paul Peeters
- Donald Rayfield
- Stephen H. Rapp
- Charles Renoux
- Goldie Blankoff-Scarr
- Peter F. Skinner
- Hugo Schuchardt
- Hayate Sotome
- Nina Sumbatova
- Ronald Grigor Suny
- Lajos Tardy
- Cyril Toumanoff
- Kevin Tuite
- Béla Vikár
- Katharine Vivian
- Hans Vogt
- John Oliver Wardrop
- Marjory Wardrop
- Thomas R. Wier

== Periodicals ==
- Bedi Kartlisa. Revue de Kartvélologie
- Georgica
- Revue des études géorgiennes et caucasiennes
