= Kalistrat Salia =

Georgian historian and philologist

Kalistrate Salia (Georgian: კალისტრატე სალია; 1901–1986) was a Georgian émigré historian and philologist active in France.

Salia was born on 18 July 1901 in Mingrelia, western Georgia. He studied at Zugdidi and Khashuri before enrolling into the University of Tbilisi in 1920. After the Soviet takeover of Georgia in 1921, he went to Germany where he studied at the Institute of German Language, University of Berlin. He moved to France in 1924 and graduated from the University of Paris in 1927. In 1948, together with his wife Nino Salia, he founded and edited the journal Bedi Kartlisa dedicated to Kartvelian studies. He published a series of scholarly works on the history and literature of Georgia and wrote Georgia-related entries for foreign encyclopedias. His 1980 work Histoire de la nation géorgienne (translated into English as History of the Georgian Nation in 1983) was awarded the prize of the French Academy of Sciences.
