= Mikheil Tsereteli =

Georgian prince, historian, philologist, and sociologist

- მიხეილ წერეთელი
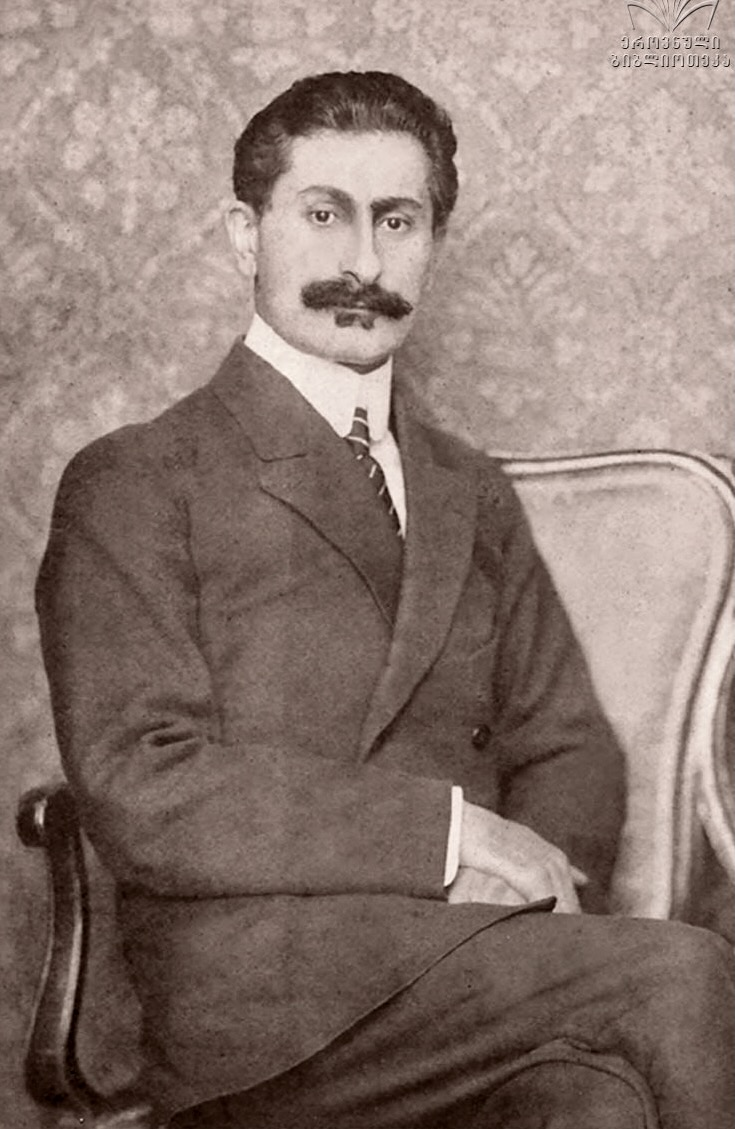
- Born: 23 December 1878; Tskhrukveti, Imereti, Russian Empire
- Died: 2 March 1965 (aged 86); Munich, West Germany
- Resting place: Leuville-sur-Orge, France
- Citizenship: Russian Empire→ Democratic Republic of Georgia→ Soviet Union → Nazi Germany→ West Germany
- Occupations: philologist, historian, sociologist

Prince Mikheil "Mikhako" G. Tsereteli also known as Michael von Zereteli (Georgian: მიხეილ "მიხაკო" წერეთელი) (December 23, 1878 – March 2, 1965) was a Georgian prince, historian, philologist, sociologist and public benefactor. At different times he was a Marxist, an anarchist, and a nationalist. He is recognized as National Hero of Georgia.

== Life ==
He was born in 1878, in a village Tskhrukveti (Imereti region of Western Georgia). His father was Prince Giorgi Tsereteli. His brother Vasil Tsereteli (1862–1938) was a famous Georgian physician, writer and public benefactor.

In 1911 Mikheil Tsereteli graduated from Heidelberg University (Germany), and received a PhD degree in history in 1913. From 1914 to 1918, he was associate professor at Berlin University and Chairman of the Committee of Independent Georgia. In 1916 Tsereteli was a representative of Georgia in the Union of Nations in Lausanne, and in 1918-1919 Ambassador of the Democratic Republic of Georgia (DRG) in Sweden and Norway.

From 1919 to 1921, Tsereteli was a professor at the Tbilisi State University (TSU).

On February 25, 1921, Georgia was occupied by Soviet Russia, and the following month Mikheil Tsereteli went into exile to Western Europe.

From 1921 to 1933 Tsereteli was a professor at the University of Brussels (Belgium), and from 1933 to 1945 a professor at Berlin University. After 1945, he lived and worked in Munich.

In the 1930s and 1940s, he was a Chairman of the "Georgian National Committee" (Berlin-Paris).

Prince Tsereteli was a member of the editorial board of the journal "Bedi Kartlisa – Revue de Kartvelologie" (Paris).

Main fields of academic activity of Prof. Tsereteli were: Sumerology, history of Georgia and the Caucasus, history of Ibero-Caucasian civilization, Rustvelology (Shota Rustaveli was a great Georgian Poet of the 12th century), the rights of the Nations (Peoples), sociology, etc. He was author of more than 80 scientific-research works (among them about 10 monographs).

Mikheil Tsereteli died in 1965, in Munich. He is buried in Leuville-sur-Orge (France). In 2013, he was posthumously awarded the title and Order of National Hero of Georgia.

== Selected bibliography ==
- "Nation and mankind. Sociological investigation" (a monograph), Tbilisi, 1910, 250 pp. (in Georgian).
- "Sumerian and Georgian: a study in comparative philology" (a monograph), JRAS, 1913 (in English).
- Shota Rustaveli. "Der Mann im Tigerfelle". Edited and translated from Georgian by M. Tsereteli, Munich, 1955 (in German).
- "Georgien und der Weltkrieg" (a monograph), Potsdam, 1915 (in German).
- "Das Sumerische und das Georgische" – "Bedi Kartlisa. Revue de Kartvélologie", No. 32–33, Paris (in German)
