= Reichsheer =

Reichsheer may refer to:

- the Army of the Holy Roman Empire until 1806
- the Imperial German Army from 1871 to 1918
- the Reichswehr from 1921 to 1935
