= Committee of Independent Georgia =

Committee of Independent Georgia საქართველოს განთავისუფლების კომიტეტი
- Chairperson: Petre Surguladse
- Founded: 1914
- Dissolved: 1918
- Merged into: National Council of Georgia
- Headquarters: Berlin (1914–1916); Samsun (1916–1917); Giresun (1917–1918)
- Paramilitary wing: Georgian Legion
- Ideology: Georgian nationalism Social democracy
- International affiliation: Central Powers

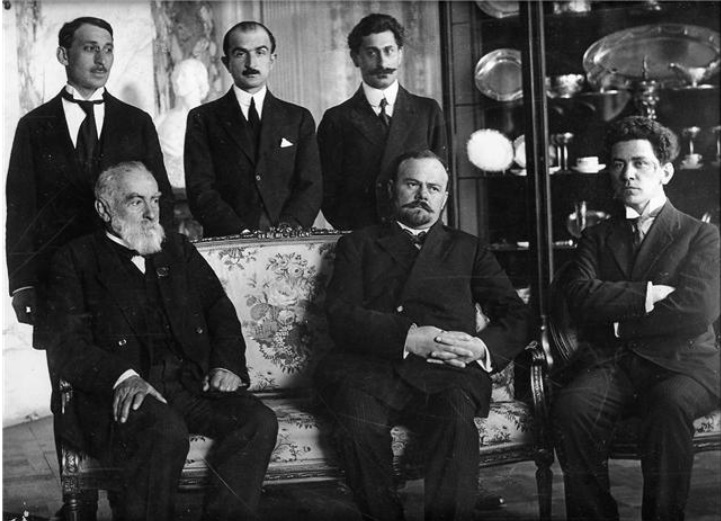
Members of the Georgian diplomatic delegation in Berlin, 1918

The Committee of Independent Georgia (Georgian: საქართველოს განთავისუფლების კომიტეტი, romanized: sakartvelos gantavisuplebis k'omit'et'i), also known as the Georgian Committee, was a political organization formed in 1914 by Georgian émigrés and students in Germany during World War I. It aimed at ending Imperial Russian rule in Georgia and reasserting the country’s independence under German protection. The committee was chaired by Petre Surguladse; other members included Prince Georges Matchabelli, Mikheil Tsereteli (a notable scholar who had abandoned Kropotkinite Anarchism in favor of Georgian nationalism), Leo and Giorgi Kereselidze, and the Muslim Georgian Osman Bey (Meliton) Kartsivadze. The committee also established branches in Austria-Hungary and the Ottoman Empire.

During the Caucasus Campaign of 1916–1917, the committee was headquartered in Samsun, and later in Kerasunt. From there, the organization attempted to establish contacts with dissidents in Georgia. The leading independent political party, the Social Democrats (Mensheviks), maintained neutrality and did not engage in antiwar activity. Their expressed Russian orientation convinced the Tsarist authorities to allow them to operate freely in the Caucasus. Thus the Mensheviks were reluctant to collaborate with the committee, which advocated a break with Russia and an independent Georgian state. Mikheil Tsereteli himself made a secret trip to Georgia (landing from a German submarine SM UB-42). He met with the Menshevik leader Noe Zhordania at Kutaisi, and urged him to consider a pro-German orientation. But at that time, Zhordania considered any confrontation with the Tsarist administration political suicide and Tsereteli’s mission ended unsuccessfully. Yet the committee and its supporters, although not very numerous, represented quite a serious problem for the Russian government, especially after the committee established a volunteer unit, the Georgian Legion, as part of the German Caucasus Expedition. Although the movement continued to be backed by Germany, its relations with the Ottoman government became extremely strained. As a result, the Georgian Legion was officially disbanded in April 1917. The members of both the committee and the legion returned to Georgia after the Russian Revolution of 1917 and joined the independence movement that concluded with the proclamation of the Democratic Republic of Georgia on May 26, 1918.
