= Irine Melikishvili =

Georgian linguist (1943–2013)

- Born: 29 May 1943; Tbilisi, Georgia
- Died: 2 December 2013 (aged 70)
- Education: Tbilisi State University
- Occupation: Linguist

Irine Melikishvili (Georgian: ირინე მელიქიშვილი; May 29, 1943 – December 2, 2013) was a Georgian linguist. From 2000 she was Professor of Comparative linguistics and Phonetics at Javakishvili Tbilisi State University in Tbilisi, Georgia.

== Career ==
A native of Tbilisi, Melikishvili received the Candidate's degree in 1972, with her thesis Application of Marking in Phonology. She earned her Dr. of Philological Sciences degree in 1997, from Tbilisi State University, where she had previously completed her previous degrees. Her PhD dissertation was titled Common Kartvelian root in structural and typological terms.

From 1965 to 1986 she worked at the Linguistics Institute of the Georgian Academy of Sciences. From 1986 until her death she worked as Senior Researcher in the Department of General Phonetics and Typology of Oriental Linguistics at the Tsereteli Institute of Oriental Studies. In 1995 she was appointed to the Laboratory of Research on Kartvelian languages at the Orbeliani Pedagogical University, and from 2000 until her death in 2013, she was Acting Department Head and a full professor at Tbilisi State University.

== Awards ==
Melikishvili was elected a Corresponding Member of the Georgian National Academy of Sciences in 2009.

== Selected publications ==
- 1976. Mark'irebis mimarteba ponologiaši. ['The relation of marking in phonology'.] Tbilisi: Mecniereba.
- 1980. Struktura kornja v obščekartvel'skom i obščeindoevropejskom. Voprosy jazykoznanija 4: 60–70.
- 1998. Nominat'iur da ergat'iul (akt'iur) k'onst'rukciata urtiertmimartebistvis. [On the relationships of nominative and ergative (active) constructions.] Kartuli enis k'atedris šromebi 4: 127–144.
- 2002. Kartvelur-indoevrop'uli genet'uri urtiertmimartebis sak'itxisatvis. [On the question of the genetic relations of Kartvelian and Indoeuropean.] Enatmecnierebis sak'itxebi 1: 34–54.
