= Friedrich Freiherr Kress von Kressenstein =

German military officer (1870–1948)

Friedrich Kress von Kressenstein Pasha
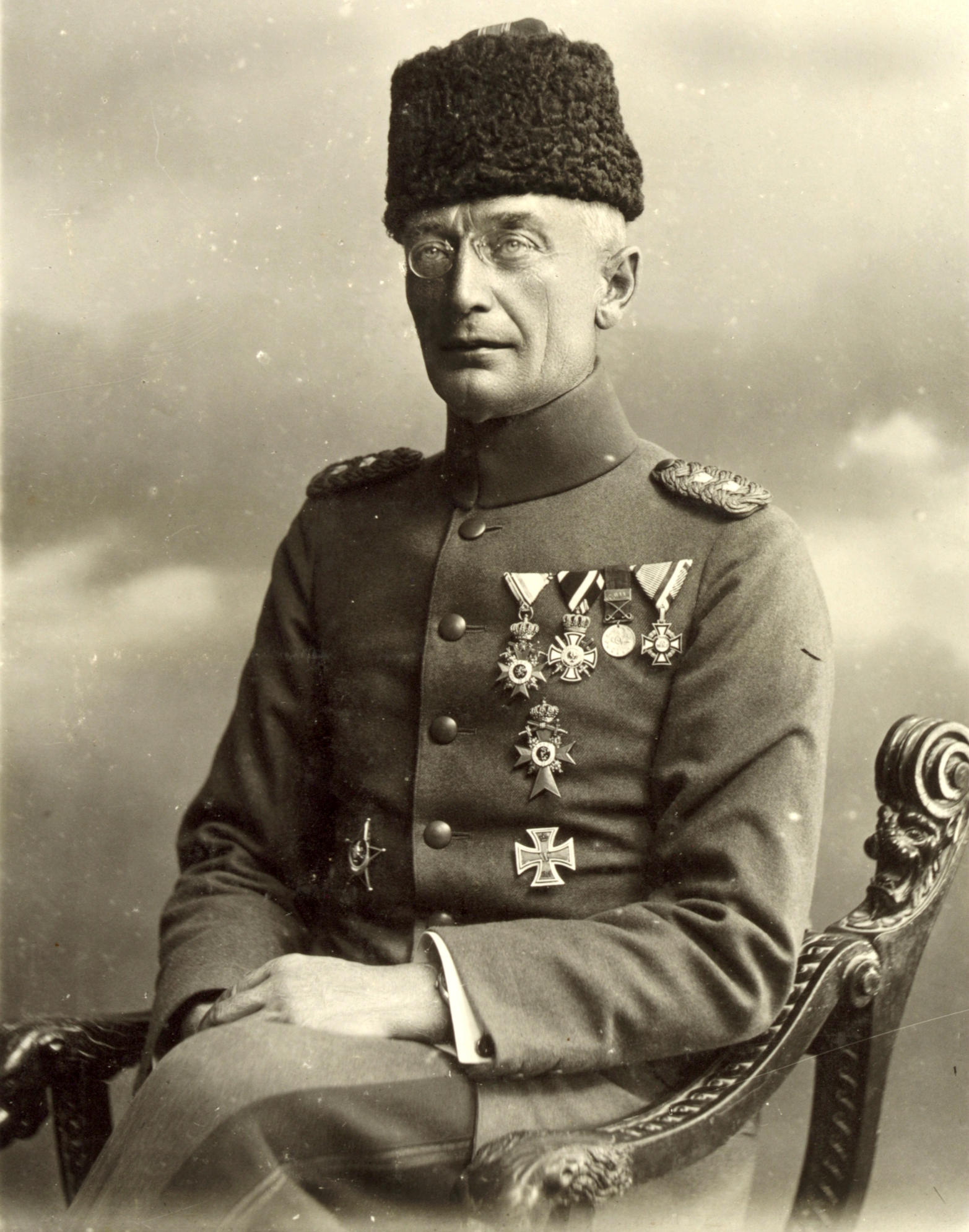
- While in Ottoman military uniform as commander of the Sinai and Palestine campaign, 1916
- Born: 24 April 1870; Nuremberg, Kingdom of Bavaria
- Died: 16 October 1948 (aged 78); Munich, Allied-occupied Germany
- Military career
- Allegiance: German Empire; Ottoman Empire; Weimar Republic
- Branch: Imperial German Army; Ottoman Army; Reichsheer
- Service years: 1888–1929
- Rank: General der Artillerie (Germany); Ferik (Ottoman Empire)
- Commands: Eighth Army (Ottoman Empire)
- Conflicts: World War I; Sinai and Palestine Campaign; Raid on the Suez Canal; Battle of Romani; First Battle of Gaza; Second Battle of Gaza; Battle of Beersheba; Third Battle of Gaza; Battle of Katia; Battle of Mughar Ridge; Capture of Wadi el Hesi; Battle of Hareira and Sheria; Southern Palestine offensive; Battle of Jerusalem; Caucasus Campaign; German Caucasus expedition; Sochi conflict
- Awards: Pour le Mérite; Iron Cross 2nd and 1st class

Friedrich Siegmund Georg Freiherr Kress von Kressenstein (also German: Kreß and Turkish: Kress Pasha; 24 April 1870 – 16 October 1948) was a German general from Nuremberg. He was a member of the group of German officers who assisted in the direction of the Ottoman Army during World War I. Kress von Kressenstein was part of the military mission of Otto Liman von Sanders to the Ottoman Empire, which arrived shortly before World War I broke out. He was also the main leader for the Ottoman Desert Command Force (DCF).

== Early life ==
Kress von Kressenstein came from a patrician family in Nuremberg. His father, Georg Kress von Kressenstein (1840–1911), was a high court judge. Kress von Kressenstein joined the Bavarian army as an ensign in the artillery in 1888. He was appointed as a second lieutenant on 6 March 1890. On 1 October 1895, he joined the Bavarian War Academy and graduated in September 1898. He continued his general staff education until 1914. With Otto Liman von Sanders, Kressenstein was sent to the Ottoman Empire and served as the commander of the Ottoman field artillery school.

== World War I ==
=== Palestine ===
Kress von Kressenstein joined Djemal Pasha's army in the Ottoman Province of Jerusalem as a military engineer and was later chief of staff. Djemal Pasha was given the job by the war minister Enver Pasha of capturing or disabling the Suez Canal. This effort is called the First Suez Offensive, and it occurred in January 1915. Kress von Kressenstein was responsible for creating special boats for crossing the canal (pontoons) as well as organizing the crossing of the Sinai desert. While the desert was crossed with little loss of life, the British were aware of their approach and their attack on the Suez came as no surprise to the defenders. The Ottoman forces were repulsed easily and after two days of fighting, they retreated. Kress von Kressenstein's special pontoons were never used.

More than a year passed when the Ottomans tried a second attack on the Suez. With Djemal Pasha directing affairs from his base in Damascus, Kress von Kressenstein led a larger Ottoman army across the Sinai desert, again. This attack ran into a strong British defensive fortification at Romani, 40 kilometres (25 mi) east of the canal. The Ottoman army prepared a major set-piece assault on Romani, scheduled for 3 August 1916 (see the Battle of Romani for a detailed description). The attack was beaten off and again the Ottomans retreated back to their bases in Palestine.

The British responded with an attack of their own. They captured some small Ottoman forts in the Sinai, built a railroad and water pipe across the desert and then launched an assault on the Ottoman fort at Gaza. Kress von Kressenstein was in charge of the Ottoman defences along with General Tala Bey. In the First Battle of Gaza (March 1917), the British were defeated, largely due to their own errors. In the Second Battle of Gaza in April 1917, the British were defeated again, the credit for this victory largely going to Kress von Kressenstein.

The British removed their unsuccessful generals and replaced them with General Allenby. The Ottomans also replaced their top leadership, bringing in the former Chief of the German General Staff, General von Falkenhayn. Kress von Kressenstein was kept on as commander of the Ottoman 8th Army defending Gaza and he was also awarded Prussia's highest order, the Pour le Mérite.

In November 1917, the British under General Allenby breached the Ottoman defensive positions at the Battle of Beersheba and the Third Battle of Gaza. Kress von Kressenstein was able to withdraw his defeated troops in fairly good order to new defensive positions in the north.

=== Caucasus ===
In the middle of 1918, with the Ottoman-German alliance breaking down, Kress von Kressenstein was sent with a small German force to Georgia, that was protected by Germany after its independence. He helped to frustrate the Red Army's invasion of the Georgian region Abkhazia.

== Later life ==
Kress von Kressenstein remained in the post-war Reichswehr, advanced to the rank of General der Artillerie and became the commander-in-chief of Group Command 2 in Kassel in January 1928. He retired in 1929 and died in Munich in 1948.

He wrote in several articles about his experiences in the Ottoman army and the Caucasus, and published in 1938 a full book about the war in the Sinai, Jerusalem and Gaza. At least two of his articles have been translated into English: 'The Campaign in Palestine from the Enemy's Side', published in the Royal United Services Institute Journal; and his 1936 article about the 'war in the desert', in which he discussed also the use of poison gas in war, both in the Sinai Desert during World War I and in the Italian conquest of Ethiopia (called Abyssinia at the time). His memoirs My Mission in Caucasus were published posthumously in 2001 in Tbilisi, Georgia.

== In popular culture ==
He was played by Ralph Cotterill in the film The Lighthorsemen (1987).

== Decorations and awards ==
- Pour le Mérite (Prussia)
- Order of the Red Eagle 4th class with crown (Prussia)
- Order of the Crown 2nd class with swords (Prussia)
- Knight's Cross of the House Order of Hohenzollern with swords (Prussia)
- Iron Cross (1914) 1st and 2nd class (Prussia)
- Commander's Cross of the Military Order of Max Joseph (Bavaria)
- Officer's Cross of the Order of Military Merit (Bavaria)
- Knight's Cross 1st class of the Albert Order with swords (Saxony)
- Knight's Cross 1st class of the Friedrich Order with swords (Württemberg)
- Knight's Cross 2nd class of the Order of the Zähringen Lion with oak leaves (Baden)
- Hanseatic Cross (Hamburg)
- Military Merit Cross, 2nd class with war decoration (Austria-Hungary)
- Imtiyaz Medal in gold with swords (Ottoman Empire)
- Order of Osmanieh 2nd class with swords (Ottoman Empire)
- Order of the Medjidie 2nd class with swords (Ottoman Empire)
- Liakat Medal in gold with swords (Ottoman Empire)
- Gallipoli Star, (Ottoman Empire)

== See also ==
- Sinai and Palestine Campaign

== Bibliography ==
- Fromkin, David (1989). A Peace to End All Peace. Avon Books.
- Kreß von Kressenstein, Friedrich (1921). "Überblick über die Ereignisse an der Sinaifront von Kriegsbeginn bis zur Besetzung Jerusalems durch die Engländer 1917" [Overview of the events on the Sinai front from the beginning of the war up to the occupation of Jerusalem by the English in 1917]. Zwischen Kaukasus und Sinai. Jahrbuch des Bundes der Asienkämpfer (in German). 1: 11–54. OCLC 183365288.
- Kreß von Kressenstein, Friedrich (1923). "Achmed Djemal Pascha". Zwischen Kaukasus und Sinai. Jahrbuch des Bundes der Asienkämpfer (in German). 3. OCLC 183365288.
- Kreß von Kressenstein, Friedrich (September 1936). "Kriegführung in der Wüste" [War in the Desert]. Wissen und Wehr. Monatsschrift der Deutschen Gesellschaft für Wehrpolitik und Wehrwissenschaften (in German). 17 (9). Berlin: Verlag E.S. Mittler & Sohn: 565–590. OCLC 643162877.
- Kreß von Kressenstein, Friedrich (1936). War in the Desert. Translation of the article "Kriegführung in der Wüste" in Wissen und Wehr, Sept., 1936. Translated by Colonel Oliver L. Spaulding. Washington: Historical Section, the Army War College. OCLC 5722728.
- Kreß von Kressenstein, Friedrich (1938). Mit den Türken zum Suezkanal [With the Turks to the Suez Canal] (in German). Berlin: Vorhut-Verlag Otto Schlegel. OCLC 604167577.
- Kreß von Kressenstein, Friedrich (1943), Meine Mission im Kaukasus [My mission in Caucasus] (PDF) (in German), archived from the original (PDF) on 3 March 2016
