= Georgian Legion (1915–1918) =

World War I unit in the German army composed of Georgians

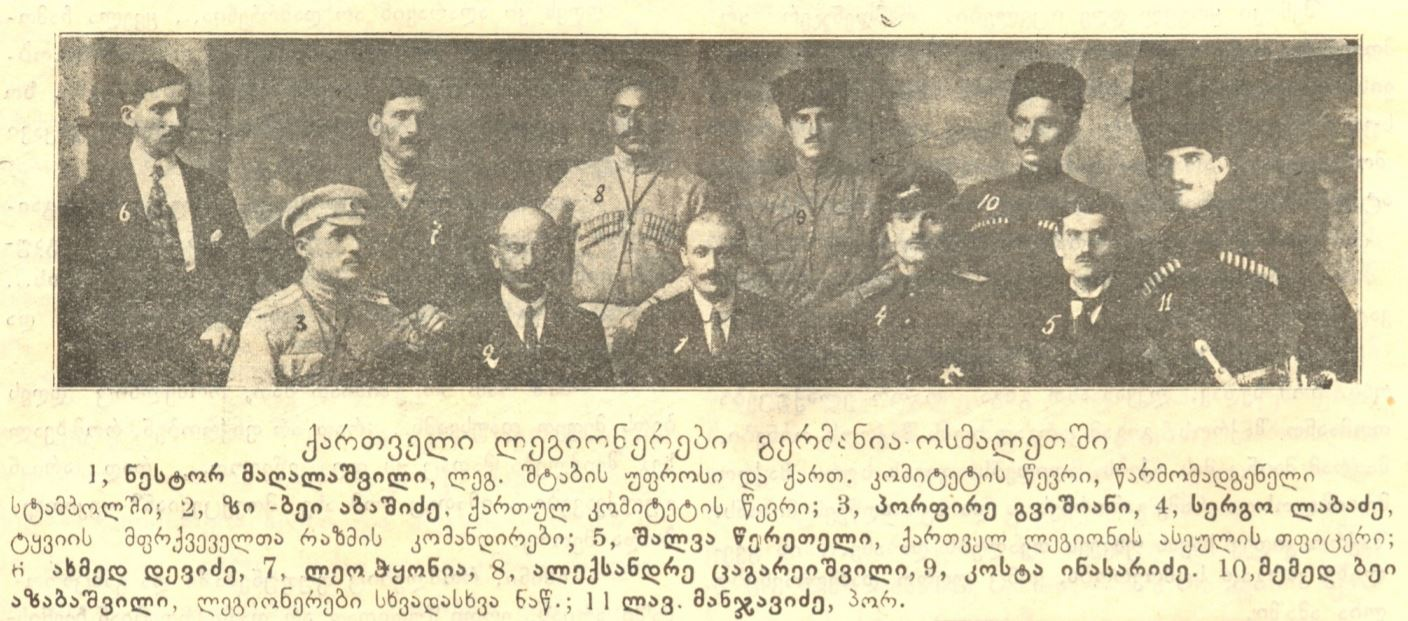
Members of the Georgian Legion

The World War I-era Georgian Legion (German: Georgische Legion, Georgian: ქართული ლეგიონი, romanized: kartuli legioni) was formed in 1915 by Count Friedrich Werner von der Schulenburg, a former German vice-consul in Tiflis, who then served as a German liaison officer with the Ottoman 3rd Army. The German Empire-based Committee of Independent Georgia supported him. The reinforcements were raised largely from refugees from the Muslim Georgian areas and Lazistan, as well as from Prisoners of War.

Approximately 1,500 soldiers strong, the Legion was first commanded by Lieutenant Horst Schliephack. The Legion's highest-ranking Georgian officer was Leo Kereselidze. The actual number of soldiers fluctuated heavily, but never exceeded 2,000.

The Georgian Legion joined the German Caucasus Expedition. During the Russo-Turkish campaign of 1916–7, the Georgian Legion was stationed in the mountains east of Tirebolu, on the banks of the Harşit River, near the Black Sea coast. The Legion was originally intended to promote a revolt in Russian-held Georgia and remained under German control, while the Ottomans sought to use it as a normal unit within their army.

Late in 1915, the Order of Queen Tamar was introduced for issue to the soldiers and officers of the Georgian Legion.

In the end, it took little part in the fighting, stationed on the Black Sea coast at Giresun until it was disbanded in January 1917, after relations between the German-backed Georgian Committee and the Ottoman government had become strained. The former Georgian volunteer officers later joined the National Army of the Democratic Republic of Georgia in 1918. The Georgian Legion also served as one of many components aimed at destabilising Russian imperial rule and was part of Germany's broader approach to subversive foreign policy.
