= Bedi Kartlisa =

Academic Georgian studies journal

- Discipline: Kartvelology
- Language: Georgian; French; English; German
- Edited by: Kalistrate Salia

Publication details
- History: 1948–1984

Standard abbreviations
- ISO 4: Bedi Kartlisa

Indexing
- ISSN: 0373-1537

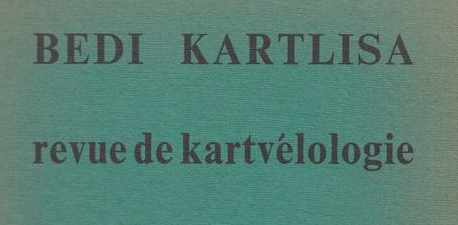
1969 cover of Bedi Kartlisa. Revue de Kartvélologie

Bedi Kartlisa. Revue de Kartvélologie was an international academic journal specializing in the language, literature, history, and art of Georgia (Kartvelology) published from 1948 to 1984. It derived its name from the poem Bedi kartlisa (Georgian: ბედი ქართლისა; "The Destiny of Georgia") by the 19th-century Georgian Romanticist poet Nikoloz Baratashvili.

Established by Kalistrate Salia and Nino Salia, Georgian émigrés from the Soviet Union, the journal was published exclusively in Georgian until 1957 when it became multilingual in French, English, and German. Sponsored by the French Academy of Sciences and edited by Salia, the journal played a crucial role in the development of Georgian studies in Europe. It was succeeded by the annual Revue des études géorgiennes et caucasiennes (ISSN 0373-1537) established in 1985 by Georges Dumézil and Georges Charachidzé.

The annual journal Georgica (ISSN 0232-4490) covers a similar range of subjects.
