= Armeno-Georgian War =

1918 armed conflict in Georgia and Armenia

- Part of the aftermath of World War I and the Southern Front of the Russian Civil War
Date	7–31 December 1918; (3 weeks and 3 days)
Location	Borchaly (Lori) and Akhalkalaki districts
Result	Inconclusive, see aftermath
Territorial changes	Establishment of the Lori neutral zone, Armenia annexes negligible land in Borchaly

Belligerents
First Republic of Armenia	Democratic Republic of Georgia

Commanders and leaders
(First Republic of Armenia) Drastamat Kanayan	(Democratic Republic of Georgia) Giorgi Mazniashvili (Democratic Republic of Georgia) Varden Tsulukidze

Strength
In Lori: 3 infantry regiments (28 companies); 4 cavalry squadrons 26 machine guns 7 mountain cannons Support from local inhabitants and partisans In Georgia proper: 12 infantry companies at Sadakhlo	In Lori: Fewer infantry 2 armored trains In Georgia proper: 2 infantry regiments 1,000 troops and 1 armored train at Sadakhlo; 3,500 troops at Shulaveri

Casualties and losses
Total: Fewer than Georgia: ~200 at Shulaveri (Dec 28); "Heavy losses" at Sadakhlo (Dec 22); Less than 100 taken prisoner	Total: Heavy: ~1,000 taken prisoner total; 500 killed, wounded, or captured at Hairum; 60 casualties in pincer movement; 2 armored trains, 28 cannons, ~75 machine guns, 200 loaded freight cars, and 3 locomotives

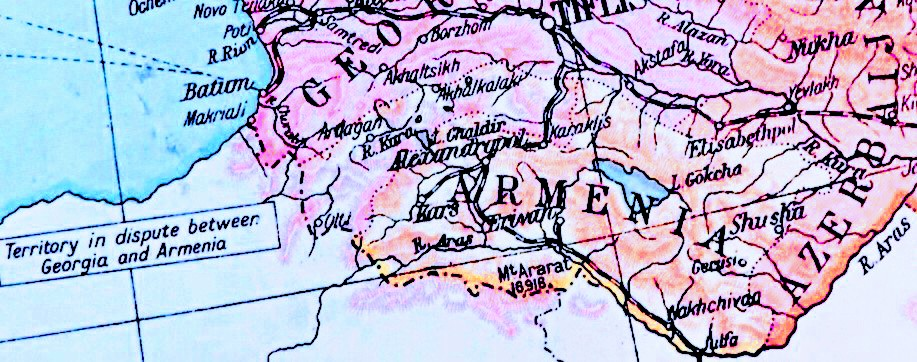
1920 map of the Territory in dispute between Georgia and Armenia in 1918-1920

The Armeno-Georgian War was a short border dispute that was fought in December 1918 between the newly independent Democratic Republic of Georgia and the First Republic of Armenia, largely over the control of former districts of the Tiflis Governorate, in Borchaly (Lori) and Akhalkalaki.

In May 1918, towards the end of World War I, Armenia and Georgia both declared their independence, dissolving the short-lived union between them. Both Georgia and Armenia claimed Lori and Akhalkalaki, both of which were populated primarily by Armenians. The border dispute turned into an open military conflict on 7 December 1918. Armenian forces initiated coup de mains that brought them within 10 kilometers of the Georgian capital, Tiflis, before Georgian troops were able to organize counterattacks. Allied intervention forced a ceasefire. Battles continued until the ceasefire came into effect at midnight on December 31.

A neutral zone, under Allied supervision, was declared in the Borchaly district, which would later be split in between the two states. The large Armenian population of Tiflis and other Georgian-controlled regions was subject to mass arrests and other forms of persecution both during and after the war. Armenia did not succeed in the nearly-obtained original goal of gaining land up to the Khrami River, and the entire war took place on land that had been controlled prior by Georgia. The result of the war is considered inconclusive, with the Armenian side declaring a successful liberation of Armenian territories and the Georgian side declaring a successful defense against an invasion.

== Background ==
=== Russian Revolution ===
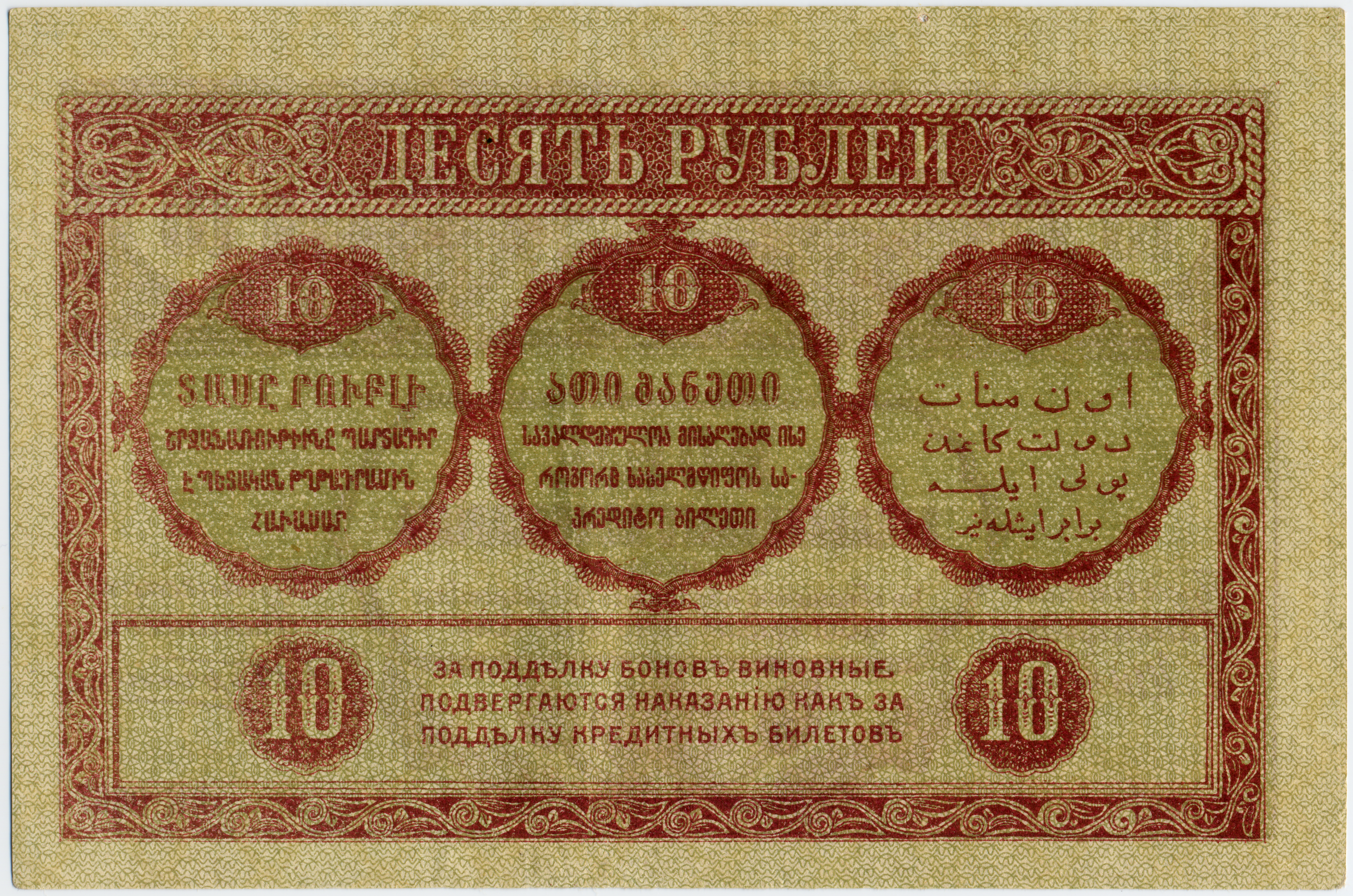
10 ruble banknote of the Transcaucasian Commissariat

After the February Revolution, the Russian Provisional Government installed the Special Transcaucasian Committee to govern the area. However, after the October Revolution, the Special Transcaucasian Committee was replaced on 11 November 1917 by the Transcaucasian Commissariat, centred in Tbilisi. The Commissariat concluded the Armistice of Erzincan with the Ottoman Empire on 5 December 1917, which ended a localised armed conflict with the Ottoman Empire. The Commissariat actively sought to suppress Bolshevik influence and meanwhile to pursue a path towards Transcaucasian independence from Soviet Russia. That included establishing a legislative body, the Transcaucasian Sejm, to which the Commissariat surrendered its authority on 23 January 1918 after the dispersal of the Russian Constituent Assembly by the Bolsheviks. The secessionist and anti-Bolshevik agenda eventually brought Transcaucasian Sejm into conflict with the central government. On 3 March, the Russians signed the Treaty of Brest-Litovsk, marking Russia's exit from World War I. In the treaty, Russia agreed to return territory gained during the Russo-Turkish War of 1877–1878, despite the fact that the territory was under the effective control of Armenian and Georgian forces. The Trebizond Peace Conference between the Ottoman Empire and the Sejm began on 4 March and continued until April. The Ottomans offered to surrender all of their ambitions in the Caucasus in return for recognition of the re-acquisition of the eastern Anatolian provinces awarded at Brest-Litovsk.

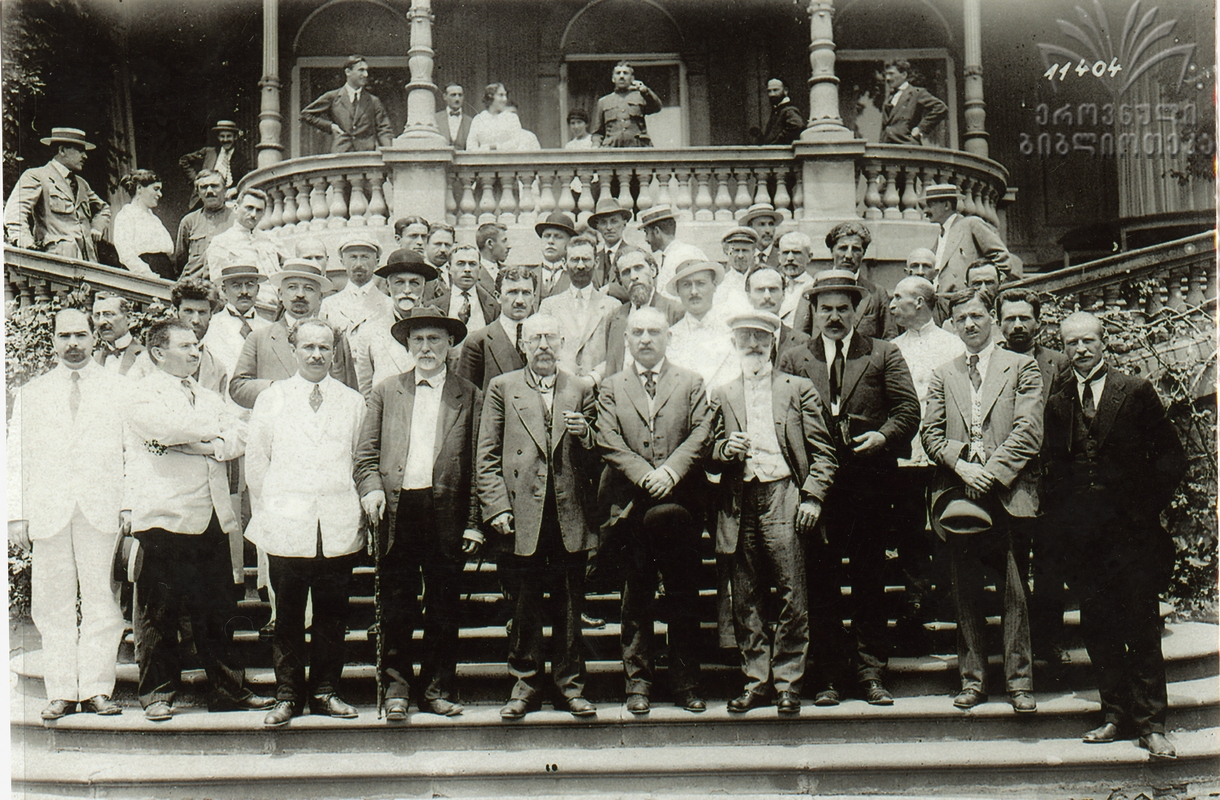
Members of the Georgian National Council

By then, leading Georgian politicians viewed an alliance with Germany as the only way to prevent Georgia from being occupied by the Ottoman Empire. Consequently, the National Council of Georgia declared the independence of the Democratic Republic of Georgia on 26 May and, two days later, signed the Treaty of Poti with Germany to place itself under German protection. The following day, the Muslim National Council announced the establishment of the Azerbaijan Democratic Republic. Having been largely abandoned by its allies, the Armenian National Council declared independence on May 28. On 4 June, the Ottoman Empire signed the Treaty of Batum with each of the three Transcaucasusian states, which brought the conflict with the Ottoman Empire to an end. The treaty awarded the southern half of the ethnically Armenian Lori subdistrict (uchastok) and Akhalkalaki district to the Ottomans, but it did not firmly delineate the borders between the new Transcaucasus states. In order to deny the Ottomans a direct route to Tbilisi, Georgian units, supported by German officers, took possession of northern Lori and established outposts along the Dzoraget River. The Georgian prime minister Noe Zhordania assured the Armenian National Council that the occupation was a temporary measure. However, in a subsequent meeting Georgian representatives laid claim to all of the districts of the Tiflis Governorate, as well as the Pambak subdistrict of the Erivan Governorate, eliciting protests from the Armenian side.

=== Initial clashes ===
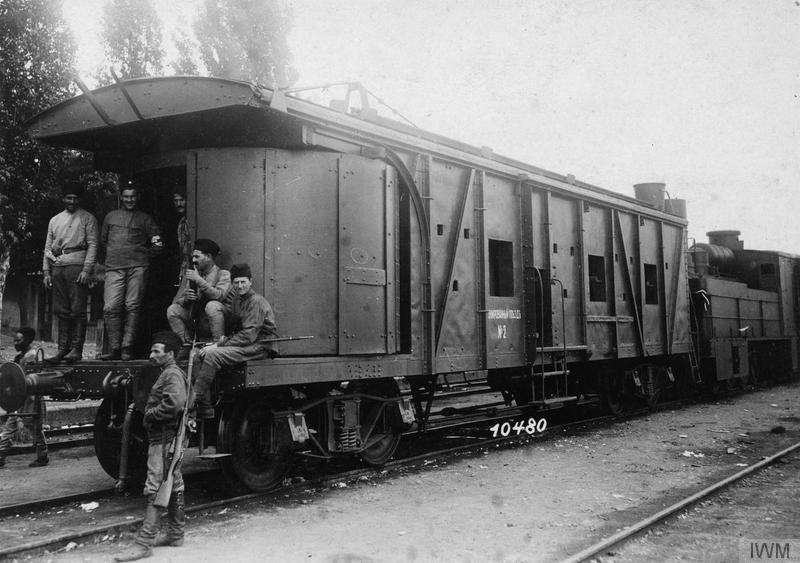
A Georgian armoured train

In early October 1918, the Ottomans pulled back from southern Lori, which eliminated the territorial buffer between Armenia and Georgia. The Armenian military quickly filled the void by taking control of much of southern Lori on 18 October and, in the absence of any resistance, probed further north. The first incident between Armenia and Georgia occurred the same day, when an Armenian army detachment seized the railway station in the village of Kober, near modern-day Tumanyan, and refused a subsequent demand from the Germans to withdraw. Another village, Korinj, was also seized. The Armenians withdrew when Georgia sent a detachment to confront them, but they later returned to Korinj and occupied Tsater. Armenia's ambassador to Tbilisi, Arshak Djamalian, insisted that Armenian claims over Lori were indisputable, but that his government wished to pursue its claims solely by diplomatic means. the Armenian parliament sent a message to its Georgian counterpart declaring calling for an amicable solution "in the name of the centuries-long brotherly relations of the two peoples". The Georgian government agreed with a peaceful settlement in principle. However, Armenian troops had to leave recently occupied villages, and further operations within the Tiflis Governorate would be considered an act of war. The commander of the German military expedition reminded Djamalian that Germany was obliged to defend its protectorate. On October 24 the Georgian government declared martial law in Lori, deployed General Tsulukidze and ordered him to deal with armed formations behind Georgian lines. He was, however, instructed to avoid direct confrontation with the Armenian troops, who were occupying Korinj and Tsater. On October 26 the invading Armenian forces were ordered to return and left the two villages amid the deployment of a Georgian contingent in the area.

In November and early December, the Armenians of Lori protested that Georgian troops, under the guise of "conducting investigations", robbed food and supplies from the homes of Armenian peasants and molested women. Georgian troops were accused of similar crimes at Akhalkalaki. The historian Christopher J. Walker compared the Georgian occupation of Lori to a "tsarist-style military bureaucracy". The historian Leo wrote:

"Our history of the past two thousand years leads us to the conclusion that we could not imagine Armenia through the centuries without Lori. This would be considered all the more unimaginable today, because to cut off Lori form the body of Armenia means to dismember its entire past and its cultural treasures-to concede to looting the magnificent accomplishments of hundreds of generations through the centuries."

The Armenian government made attempts to solve the dispute diplomatically on 9 and 12 December, which terms the Georgian government rejected. On 12 December, Armenian Prime Minister Hovhannes Kajaznuni sent the following message to his Georgian counterpart Noe Zhordania:

"The conduct of Georgian troops in Borchalu, in that part of Armenia occupied forcibly by Georgia, has created an intolerable situation. Only the immediate withdrawal of Georgian troops from that region can prevent new bloodshed and lead to the restoration of friendly, lasting relations between Georgia and Armenia. With this view the government of Armenia has the honor to propose to the government of Georgia that it remove its troops, without further delay, from that part of Armenia which lies within the Borchalu uezd. In the event of refusal or evasion on your part, the Armenian government will be obliged to take the necessary measures to protect the citizens of Armenia from the violence and lawlessness of the Georgian troops."

Georgia had begun to prevent railroads from transporting foreign supplies into Armenia, which resulted in famine.

=== Disputed regions ===
Armenian-American historian Richard G. Hovannisian in his book The Republic of Armenia describes the political history of the region of Lori:

The uchastok (district) of Lori located between Pambak and the Khram River in the northern reaches of the volcanic Armenian plateau, had been detached from the Erivan guberniia in 1862 and added to the Tiflis guberniia. Historically, under the Arsacid (Arshakuni) dynasty of the first to fifth centuries A.D., Lori constituted the county of Dashir, and, under the Bagratid (Bagratuni) dynasty, ninth through eleventh centuries, it formed the core of the Armenian subkingdom of Gugark. Then, after a period of vassalage to the Seljuk Turks, Lori was included in the realms of the Georgian branch of the Bagratids, but it eventually fell to the Mongols and to Safavid Persia. Late in the eighteenth century King Iraklii II restored Georgian sovereignty over the district for a few years until all eastern Georgia was annexed by Russia in 1801. Under Romanov rule most of historic Lori was organized as the Lori uchastok, whereas the remainder was apportioned among the three other uchastoks of the Borchalu uezd. The population of the Lori uchastok was basically Armenian: 41,000 in 1914 as compared with 8,500 Russians, 3,350 Greeks, 3,300 Tatars, and fewer than 100 Georgians. Another 5,000 Armenians lived in neighboring districts of the Borchalu uezd, and the Armenian element was likewise predominant in the adjacent southern sector of the Tiflis uezd.

In 1829, following the Russo-Turkish War, the regions of Akhalkalaki and Akhaltsikhe underwent a significant redistribution of their population after being ceded by the Ottoman Empire to the Russian Empire under the Treaty of Adrianople. Many thousands of Armenians from Ottoman Armenia, who had shown open sympathy for Russia, were resettled in these newly incorporated territories, contributing to an Armenian majority, while many local Muslim Georgians fled to the Ottoman Empire following their incorporation into the Russian Empire.

== War ==
=== Order of Battle ===
==== Armenia ====
To Armenia, the primary regional threat were the Ottoman Empire and other Turkic factions. For them, an Ottoman breakthrough at the Caucasian Front was equalled with the demise of the Armenian nation. Therein and the fear of foreign incursions was the basis of creating a national military corps, even before gaining independence in 1918. Such a proposal was approved on 11 July 1917 by the provisional government and High Command. The planned Armenian corps was structured not too differently to their later Georgian counterpart, also partially inspired by Russian military doctrines and organisation. Plans were already made in 1917 and roots lied in the Armenian units that had fought for the Russian Empire since 1914. The largest of those (1,500 men strong) was led by Andranik. In 1917 some 80,000 Armenians were serving in the ranks of the Imperial Russian Army. Nearly as many in the Caucasus. In the TDFR, the corps was to consist of two infantry divisions, one "special division", one artillery division, one cavalry brigade and an engineer regiment, supplemented by six separate regiments deployed to different areas, including the Tiflis Governorate. One to be assigned for the protection of railroads. The special division was to draw manpower from Armenians who fled the Ottoman Empire. According to leaderships plans, each division would be made up of four infantry regiments with their own artillery and cavalry detachments. The cavalry brigade was to consist of two cavalry regiments and two artillery batteries. In addition several reserve units would be requested and some formed. Implemented, the Armenian army would have been of substantial size. Ultimately, the Armenians succeeded in creating an overall larger fighting force. On 1 January 1918, the Armenian Army comprised about 40,000 personnel and consisted of two rifle divisions, three volunteer brigades, one cavalry brigade and several militia battalions. Their main cadres were formed from people who had served in the period of 1914–1916. The formations were well equipped with machine guns, but lacking in artillery due to shortcomings of experienced and trained personnel in that particular area. The rifle divisions were each equipped with six heavy artillery batteries, while light guns were transferred to the volunteer forces. According to Denikin, during the summer of 1918, peacetime strength was at 22,000 men and more than 44,000 troops could be mustered in wartime. However those numbers fluctuated heavily and were more likely in the scale of 10,000–15,000. While Jones mentions three Armenian divisions by end of January and their disposition in detail. A problematic factor were ongoing conflicts like with Azerbaijan, that drew thousand of bodies in manpower, away from the mainland.

By June 1918, after establishing independence, the Armenian army at the time numbered some 12,000 men and gradually grew to 40,000. Its officer corps consisted of Armenians as well as Russians. However Allen and Muratoff note that the Armenian forces became weaker and less effective. Their 24 rifle and eight volunteer battalions didn't exceed 16,000 riflemen, 1,000 cavalrymen and 4,000 militia. Battalion sizes ranged from 400 to 600. Because of the Treaty of Batum, the size of the Armenian corps was further reduced by the end of July 1918, to only one division. This restriction however did not touch separate formations not integrated in the corps and subordinated to the government, such as the volunteer brigade led by Andronik. Despite those setbacks, Armenia was able to create a fully structured corps, beating Georgia to it by many months and into the upcoming war.

==== Georgia ====
From Georgian perspective, North-Eastern and Eastern advances of the Ottoman forces constituted an imminent threat not only to Akhaltsikhe and Akhalkalaki, but also to Tiflis. During its brief independence, Russia and Turkey remained the main threats to the Republic. In a session on May 25, 1918, the Menshevik government decided that all laws and resolutions established during the short-lived TDFR, would temporarily carry over to the newly formed Republic. Batumi was declared occupied. In June a Georgian army deployed to Abkhazia at request of the Abkhaz Council in order to quell Bolshevik revolts and in the process, took Sochi as well as Tuapse from the Red Army. By the time the Sochi conflict escalated, Georgia was effectively subjected to aggression by both Russian bolsheviks and the Ottoman Empire, which lasted until 1919. The ambitions of those two prompted creation of a cohesive armed force. A draft, which laid out the organisation structure, was presented by General Kvinitadze on 2 June 1918. Three days later on 5 June, official enlistment began on the basis of that new institution. At the time, only able bodies from the ages of 19 to 23 were allowed to serve. By June its German protector sent troops to aid in the training. The memoires of German general von Kressenstein speak of a stubborn Georgian government, that initially refused the implementation of a regular army accordingly to their demands. The ruling Georgian Social Democrats followed Marx's thesis on replacing the standing army with militia-like formations and favored the Swiss model, while the German advisers proposed a regular army, an approach also supported by Georgian military figures. Pressure forced the Georgian government to concede to a model with conscription. The government's original intention was to form two infantry divisions, one Border Guard division, three cavalry regiments and an artillery brigade, leaning towards Red Army structures. The peacetime strength was to be 30–40,000 soldiers. Kvinitadze wanted to create three divisions, so that one could at least defend against potential Ottoman thrusts towards and from the direction of Batumi, Artvin, Ardahan and Akhaltsikhe. Disagreement between German and Georgian officers delayed approval of a German inspired model until 20 August 1918. The first regular army, as per new law, was to consist of two infantry divisions, one cavalry brigade, one artillery brigade, one support company, one engineer company, one motorized company, one armored company and a fighter group. However it never reached the envisioned size or quality at any time in the First Republics existence. By November 1918, the Georgian military's manpower shortage lied at around 60%, while the army still lacked 80% of the required horses. Despite being in a terrible state, Georgian troops with the assistance of the People's Guard, managed to stall and fend off further Ottoman and Bolshevik incursions.

Throughout 1918, the majority of Georgian forces consisted of militia type formations and only in critical events, such as the Armeno-Georgian war, a large ad-hoc force would be assembled to respond. Vital instruments, such as military intelligence, were lacking almost completely. Existing People's Guard (also called Workers Guard) units were plagued by disorganisation and ill discipline, sometimes even disobedience. They were often accused of irresponsible behaviour and were being reformed. Its personnel were made up of ideology driven Menshevik party members and the Guard at large, wasn't a cohesive fighting force. It comprised territorial battalions that would be consolidated and assigned competent military leadership, only in the case of war. The relationship between Guard and regular army was described as "not ideal". The Guard enjoyed greater privileges and was heavily politicized, as de facto protector and "sword" of the Menshevik government. While the regular army was subordinated to the Defence Ministry, the entirety of the Guard was directly controlled by the Menshevik dominated parliament. The 2nd Division of the regular army completed its muster not earlier than the end of December 1918, when the war was in its final days. The cavalry brigade failed to form at all. Citations from officers often included remarks of poor quality in the majority rank and file, who were only called in for several days, when rewarding the few stand outs who committed commendable action. Exceptions were the 5th and 6th Infantry Regiments of the 1st Division, that enjoyed superior level of organisation.

=== Unrest in Lori ===
Following the Turkish retreat from southern Lori in October 1918, Armenian forces gained control of the region, resulting in a border between Armenia and Georgia. In response, the Georgian side bolstered it's garrison in the northern parts. The local populace was required to provide quarters and supplies for Georgian troops and became subject to searches and undisciplined behaviour by the soldiers. In Uzunlar, the Armenian peasantry resisted the excessive search operations. In response, Georgian troops beat the village commissar and killed an official. A Georgian military investigation confirmed the Georgian soldiers had been the instigators and requested replacement of troops, but concluded that due to the organised nature of resistance, Uzunlar was to be searched and neutralized.

By early December, rebellion seemed imminent in northern Lori. Armenian emissaries from Uzunlar traveled to the Georgian headquarters near Sanahin to protest the violence. General Tsulukidze had the emissaries arrested and sent a detachment to deal with the unrests. His troops were reportedly attacked, while the Armenians of Uzunlar claimed their village was bombarded for two days, while the Georgians claimed the villagers had opened fire. According to Tsulikidze, Armenian troops of the 4th Infantry Regiment operating in disguise were instigating an insurrection. They had disarmed a cavalry unit and the garrison at Uzunlar. Subsequently, a relief force was met with a barrage of fire. The following day an Armenian force of 350 men attacked two Georgian units and partisans crushed several soldiers by boulders rolled down a mountainside. Tsulukidze was convinced that he dealt with regular Armenian army units because orders were submitted in Russian, which was the language used by the Armenian military command. In his view Sanahin itself was in danger. The Armenian side maintained that they had no regular troops involved until mid-December, when the oppression of the local peasantry had become too severe to continue tolerating. General Goguadze, who was in charge of the armoured trains, informed the Georgian government that rails between Sanahin and Alaverdi had been sabotaged, while Tsulukidze claimed his forces were suppressed by Armenian troops at Alaverdi. The Georgian side accused Armenian villages of harbouring Armenian army units.

=== Armenian offensive ===
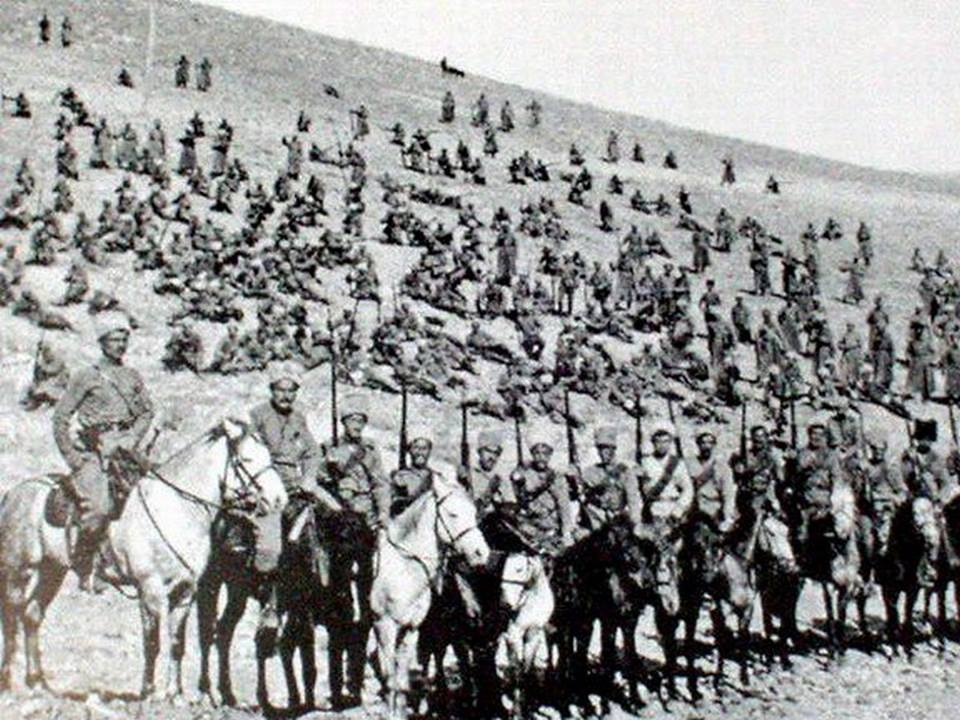
Armenian troops in 1918

On 13 December, with peaceful negotiations having failed, the government of Armenia ordered General Drastamat Kanayan to force the Georgian troops out of Lori. Captured documents revealed that Yerevan had made detailed plans to seize territories up to the river Khrami, into Georgia proper. Those seemed verified by the subsequent movements and activities of the Armenian troops. Kanayan commanded a force of 28 infantry companies, four cavalry squadrons, including reserves and was equipped with 26 machine guns and seven mountain cannons. Armenia had fewer men, provisions, and ammunition than Georgia, however their troops held the decisive advantage of surprise and penetrating into friendly territory, enjoying the support from the local Armenian population and partisans. Armenian forces quickly made substantial gains. The 4th, 5th, and 6th Regiments advanced in three columns under Colonels Ter-Nikoghosian, Nesterovskii, and Korolkov, towards the line of villages, Vorontsovka-Privolnoye-Opret-Hairum. That afternoon, the Armenians had captured Haghpat, and General Varden Tsulukidze had been forced to evacuate from the Georgian headquarters at Sanahin. By 15 December, the Armenian army captured Vorontsovka, Privolnoye, Sanahin, Mikhayelovka, Alaverdi, and the heights between Haghpat and Akhova. The Georgians had left behind their dead and wounded. The Armenians had already captured almost a hundred Georgian soldiers, as well as many cavalry mounts, fifty freight cars, a locomotive, and several machine guns and mountain cannons.

On 16 December the Armenian left flank, commanded by Ter-Nikoghosian, now advanced from Lori into Georgia proper on Bolnis-Khachen and Katharinenfeld, while Korolkov's right flank captured Hairum. Georgian forces, that consisted mostly of People's Guard units, offered poor resistance at Katharinenfeld and later at Shulaver, which put others forces in danger. The surprise attack at Hairum cost the Georgians an additional 500 men killed, wounded, or taken prisoner. On 17 December, the Georgian 5th and 6th Infantry Regiments were caught in a pincer movement by the two Armenian offensives and were able to escape, but suffered sixty extra casualties, as well as having to abandon two field guns and twenty five machine guns. The Armenians also captured two fully equipped Georgian armoured trains and Tsulukidze's personal railway coach at the station of Akhtala. Tsulukidze had fled back to Sadakhlu, and by 18 December, the column under Ter-Nikoghosian had taken Bolnis-Khachen. Back in Tiflis, a state of emergency was declared.

Reinforcements of a thousand infantrymen, a cavalry squadron, and their final armoured train were sent by Georgian War Minister Grigol Giorgadze to Sadakhlu on 18 December. Nonetheless, the Armenian right flank continued pursuing the main Georgian force at Sadakhlu, and also captured Shulaver on 20 December. The Armenians had now approached the Khrami River. Other units moved on Sadakhlu, but came under fire within range of the armored train, and sustained their first heavy losses. However, the rails to the Georgian's rear had been cut, and they were in danger of encirclement. On 22 December, the Armenians again attacked Sadakhlu and captured its station and the village outskirts, but were again forced back by the Georgian troops and their armoured train. Kanayan assembled twelve companies for a full-scale offensive. On 23 December, after hours of intense fighting, the Armenians occupied the strategic village. The Armenians took 132 Georgian POWs, over a hundred freight cars of food and munitions, 2 machine guns, and 3 trains. Casualties on the Armenian side were 7 killed and 11 wounded.

After the capture of Sadakhlu, Tsulukidze was relieved of his command and replaced by Major General Giorgi Mazniashvili. The Armenian army was now within 30 miles of the Georgian capital Tiflis. Armenian forces continued to advance on 24 December, but the next day the Georgians were reinforced by 1,000 new troops and airplanes, which bombed Shulaver. On 25 December, the Allied delegations in Tiflis had intervened to demand the war come to an end.

=== Allied intervention ===
An Allied military commission led by Lieutenant Colonels R. P. Jordan (Britain) and P. A. Chardigny (France) had been stationed in Tiflis. Georgian Foreign Minister Evgeni Gegechkori had appealed to them for intervention on 15 December. Jordan suggested all Armenian and Georgian forces withdraw from the disputed territory, which would be policed by British troops until its status was decided at the Paris Peace Conference. Gegechkori was in favor of a status quo ante bellum.

The Armenian representatives in Tiflis were not included in these early negotiations. The British and French had only messaged Premier Kajaznuni by 25 December, when diplomat Arshak Jamalyan was sent to negotiate. Jamalyan protested this one-sided treatment and objected to the annexation of any territories the Armenians controlled. The Allies wired a decision to Yerevan on 25 December. By this time, all of Lori and much of Borchaly had been controlled by Kanayan's forces:

Major General Rycroft, now in Tiflis, Chardigny of the French Mission, in company with Zhordania and in the presence of Djamalian, have decided that military activities should cease and, over the protest of Djamalian, have resolved to create a mixed commission of English, French, Armenian, and Georgian representatives to go to the front to effect this decision. The commission is to determine the number of Georgian garrisons which are to remain in the northern sector of the Borchaly uezd and the number of Armenian garrisons in the southern sector. It will also rule on the number of garrisons the Georgians will retain in Akhalkalak, with the understanding that these should be at a minimum. The Georgians are to hold their present line, while the Armenians must withdraw to the Dsegh-Jalaloghli perimeter. The British will take positions between the Georgian and Armenian troops and will create a mixed administration in that district, whereas the Georgian administration in Akhalkalak will be supervised by the Allies, with the guarantee that Armenian and Muslim representatives shall be included in the administration. Soon Georgian and Armenian envoys will depart for Europe, where the final boundaries will be determined by the Great Powers.

The decision was signed by Rycroft, Chardigny, and Zhordania, who called on both Armenian and Georgian military leaders to cease their activities. The Allies decided to impose the plan with or without the approval of the government of Armenia. Armenian officials decided to agree to the truce, on the condition that they be allowed to send a delegation to Tiflis to resolve any ambiguities in the settlement. A ceasefire was to take place on 31 December 1918.

=== Georgian counteroffensives and final clashes ===
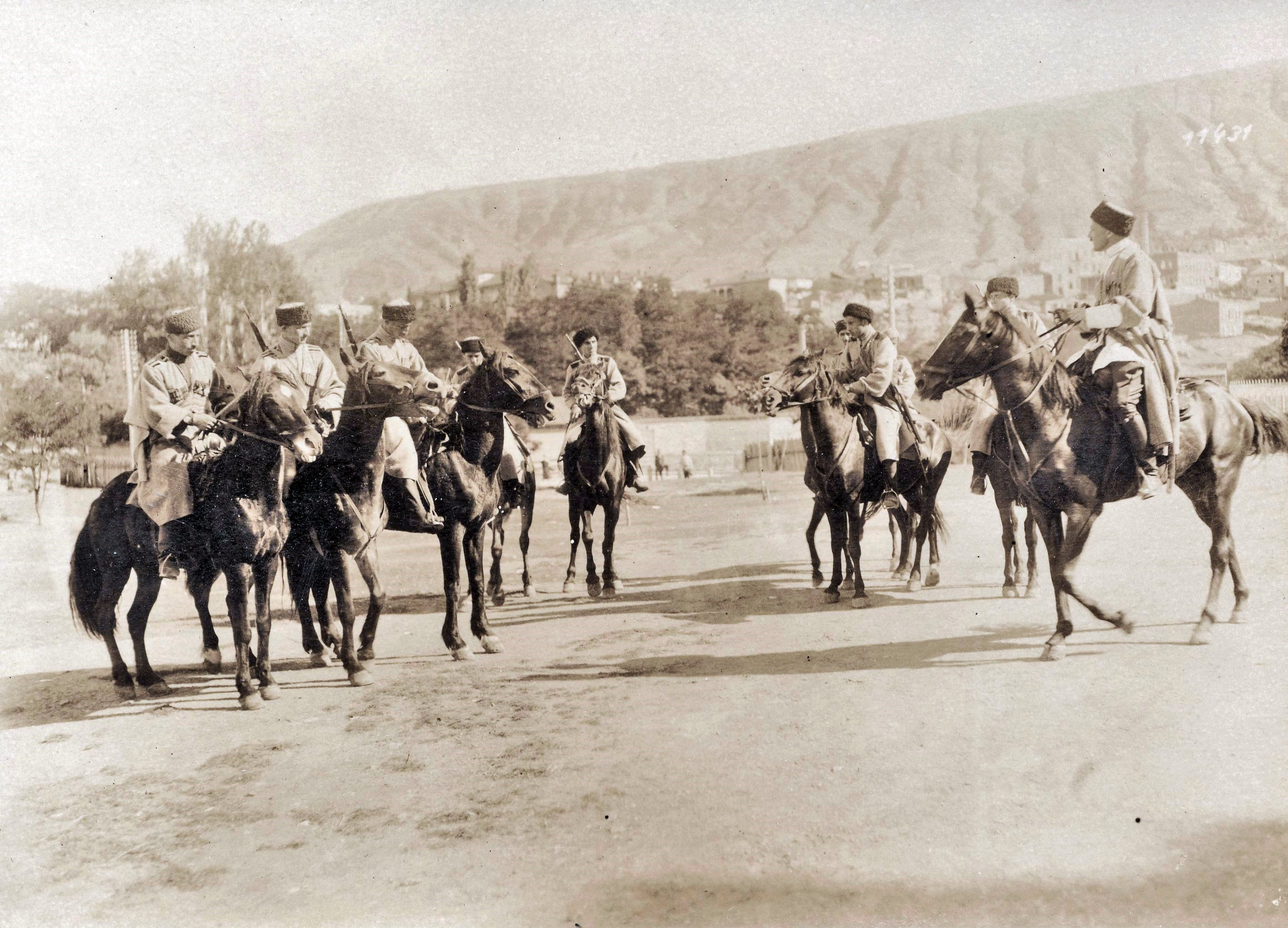
Georgian cavalrymen in 1918 armed with carbines and sabres

Both sides attempted to maintain favorable positions before the ceasefire came into effect. The Armenian soldiers had marched for two weeks without rest. No reinforcements could be sent by the government. The supplies of Armenian troops now mostly consisted of bread and munitions captured from the Georgians. An outbreak of typhus had also occurred. Conversely, the Georgians were able to quickly send reinforcements and plan operations now that hostilities were so close to Tiflis.

Several skirmishes took place from 25 to 27 December. Though the Georgian efforts had become more brazen, positions changed little during these days. On 28 December, the Georgians had made a breakthrough when a force of 3,500 instructed by Mazniashvili overtook Shulaver, as well as a number of smaller villages. The Armenians suffered 200 casualties. Over the next two days, the Armenians and Georgians fought over Sadakhlu, which changed hands several times. Eventually the two armies entrenched themselves in a stalemate, with the Armenians in station and Georgians in the town.

The final confrontations took place on 31 December, before the ceasefire would come into effect at midnight. The Armenians made strategic gains at their center and right columns, but the typhus-infected left column was pushed back. Late in the afternoon, Armenian soldiers outflanked the Georgians and took the eastern heights of Sadakhlu. In addition, the Armenians had also cut the railway leading Shulaver in Mamai. At the end of the day, both armies were situated along irregular lines. The north, south, and east of Sadakhlu were controlled by the Armenians, while the Georgians had advanced a considerable distance southwest of the village.

== Persecution of Armenians in Georgia ==
Throughout the war, Armenians in Georgia were heavily persecuted, and many were arrested without cause. Several organisations were shut down, including charities for refugees and orphans. Armenian newspapers were banned, and members of the Tiflis City Council with Armenian background were arrested. The governor of Tiflis proclaimed that every Armenian civilian was a technical prisoner-of-war. Many of the arrested Armenians were extorted and threatened with execution if they refused. Ransom prices varied between 50 and 50,000 rubles. Even after the ceasefire had been declared, thousands of arrests were made on 5 January 1919.

In January 1919, hundreds of arrested Armenian civilians were marched to Kutaisi, where they were paraded as prisoners-of-war. Georgia had actually captured few Armenian soldiers during the war. The parades were meant to prove the Georgian government's official narrative of the war as being an astonishing Georgian victory.

The persecutions were even more severe in villages outside Tiflis. In the village of Bolnis-Khachen, Georgian militias committed several acts of murder, rape and looting. Armenian peasants had been robbed of grain, crops, fabrics, livestock and various other possessions. Several homes were also destroyed. In Belyi-Kliuch, Georgian soldiers went to an orphanage demanding women. After not finding any, the Georgians instead raped prepubescent girls. They returned to the same orphanage a few days later to commit more rapes. Appeals were made to the Georgian authorities, which went ignored.

== Aftermath and assessment ==
"The Georgians, for example, whose State bounds Armenia on the north, claimed some territory which, by all ethnological rules, belonged to Armenia. The two peoples came to blows in December, 1918, and, to the astonishment of those who supposed the Armenians to be a race of degraded moneymakers, these routed the Georgians, and would perhaps, have captured Tiflis, the Georgian capital, had not the Allies intervened."

— C. E. Bechhofer Roberts

The Allied, Georgian and Armenian officials met to discuss a final settlement from 9 to 17 January 1919. Diplomatic and trade relations were resumed between the two republics. Prisoners were also returned on 23 January. The British created a neutral zone, centred in the Borchaly uezd and reaching from Sadakhlu to the prewar border with Armenia. A commissioner general, eventually decided to be Captain A. S. G. Douglas, would administer the zone and have ultimate authority on the number of Armenian and Georgian troops stationed within it. The neutral zone was split into the districts of Uzunlar, Vorontsovka, and Alaverdi. There were 41–43 villages within the neutral zone with large Armenian populations.

The war caused Allied perception of both Armenia and Georgia to become more negative. Many argued that independence for the Transcaucasian states would result in conflict and instability for the region. That proved to be a critical time, as their fates would be decided at the Paris Peace Conference a few weeks after the ceasefire.

The outcome of the war is disputed. Both the Armenians and Georgians claimed victory. Both sides also felt that they would have had a decisive victory if it had not been for the ceasefire imposed by the Allies. The Armenians had succeeded in forcing the Georgians out of northern Lori, which became a neutral zone eventually split between the two republics. However, their goal had been to seize land up to the Khrami River. The Armenians had advanced during most of the war. Although the Georgians began a counterattack in the final days, they reached a stalemate before the ceasefire. However, the war took place entirely in lands formerly controlled by Georgia. The Armenian army also suffered fewer casualties. The historian Richard G. Hovannisian suggests that the result of the conflict was inconclusive.

The Lori neutral zone lasted until November 1920, when, during the Turkish invasion of Armenia, and with the agreement of the Armenian government, the zone was taken over by Georgia to prevent its occupation by Turkey. On 12 February 1921, pro-communist forces launched an uprising in Lori, which was used by the Red Army as a pretext to invade Georgia. Following the Sovietization of Georgia, the Lori zone initially remained part of Georgia, thus providing some basis for the Soviet historical narrative of support for the "inner Georgian uprising", but was later incorporated into Soviet Armenia "on ethnic grounds".

In Soviet historiography, the war is portrayed as being instigated by "Entente imperialists" and that the Lori neutral zone was commanded by "British imperialists" and "Georgian Mensheviks".

== See also ==
- Armenian–Azerbaijani War
- Armenia–Georgia border
- Armenia–Georgia relations

== Sources ==
- Arakelian, Babken N.; Yeremian, Suren T.; Arevshatian, Sen S.; Bartikian, Hrach M.; Danielian, Eduard L.; Ter-Ghevondian, Aram N., eds. (1984). Հայ ժողովրդի պատմություն հատոր VII. ՍՈՎԵՏԱԿԱՆ ԻՇԽԱՆՈՒԹՅԱՆ ՀԱՂԹԱՆՍԿԸ ՀԱՅԱՍՏԱՆՈՒՄ [History of the Armenian People Volume VII: The Victory of Soviet Power of Armenia] (PDF) (in Armenian). Yerevan: Armenian SSR Academy of Sciences Publishing. Archived (PDF) from the original on 7 April 2022.
- Chachkhiani, Archil (2022). Gurili, Vakhtang (ed.). სომხეთ-საქართველოს ომი ნავილი I: "სომხური საკითხის" დასმიდან დაპირისპირებულ მხარეტა სტრატეგიებამდე [Armeno-Georgian War, Part I: From formulating the Armenian Question to strategies of opposing sides] (PDF) (in Georgian). Tbilisi: David Aghmashenebeli National Defence Academy of Georgia. ISBN 978-9941-8-4462-1.
- Chalabian, Antranig (2009), Dro (Drastamat Kanayan): Armenia's First Defense Minister of the Modern Era, Los Angeles: Indo-European Publishing, ISBN 978-1-60444-078-2
- Hovannisian, Richard G. (1971). The Republic of Armenia. Vol. 1: The First Year, 1918–1919. Berkeley: University of California Press. ISBN 978-0520019843.
- Hille, Charlotte Mathilde Louise (2010), State Building and Conflict Resolution in the Caucasus, Eurasian Studies Library, BRILL
- Hovannisian, Richard (1997), The Armenian People from Ancient to Modern Times: Foreign Domination to Statehood: The Fifteenth Century to the Twentieth Century, vol. II, ISBN 978-0-333-61974-2, OCLC 312951712
- Lang, David Marshall (1962), A Modern History of Georgia, London: Weidenfeld and Nicolson
- Macfie, Alexander Lyon (2014), The End of the Ottoman Empire, 1908-1923, Routledge
- Mikaberidze, Alexander (2015), Historical Dictionary of Georgia, Rowman & Littlefield
- Payaslian, S. (2008), The History of Armenia, Springer
- Shaw, Ezel Kural (1977), Reform, revolution and republic : the rise of modern Turkey (1808-1975), History of the Ottoman Empire and Modern Turkey, vol. 2, Cambridge University Press, OCLC 78646544
- Smele, Jonathan (2015), Historical Dictionary of the Russian Civil Wars, 1916-1926, Rowman & Littlefield
- Swietochowski, Tadeusz (1985), Russian Azerbaijan, 1905-1920: The Shaping of a National Identity in a Muslim Community, Cambridge University Press, ISBN 978-0-521-26310-8
- Virapian, Varik (2003), The Armenian-Georgian War of 1918, Yerevan
- სომეხი ტყვეები 1918 წლის ომის დროს, 2016
- Walker, Christopher (1980). Armenia: The Survival of a Nation (2nd ed.). New York: St. Martin's Press. ISBN 9780312049447.
- Lee, Eric (2017), The Experiment: Georgia's Forgotten Revolution 1918-1921 (English Edition), Zed Books Ltd, ISBN 978-1-78699-093-8
