= Georgian Declaration of Independence, 1918 =

Georgian Declaration of Independence
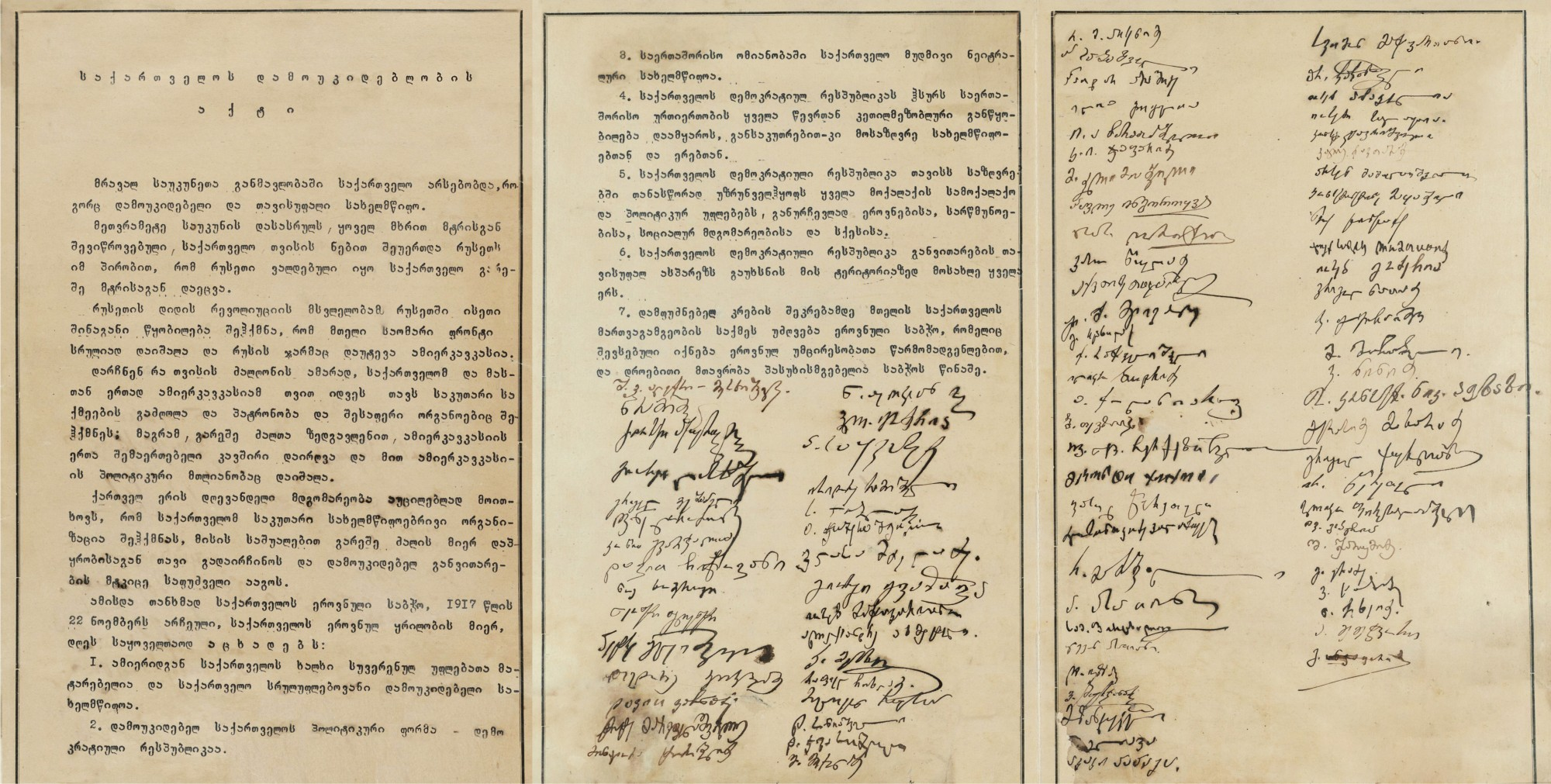
- 1918 document signed by the members of the National Council
- Created: 26 May 1918
- Location: National Archives of Georgia (the document is owned by the parliament of Georgia, but is kept in the Archives)
- Signatories: Members of the National Council of Georgia
- Purpose: Established Democratic Republic of Georgia

The Georgian Declaration of Independence or the Act of Independence of Georgia (Georgian: საქართველოს დამოუკიდებლობის აქტი) is a founding document, establishing the Democratic Republic of Georgia as independent from the Transcaucasian Democratic Federative Republic. On 26 May 1918, it was adopted by the National Council of Georgia, who convened at the National Palace in Tiflis, in the main city and later capital of Georgia.

The declaration is the first Georgian constitutional document. It has a declarative nature. It briefly conveys the historical prospects for the development of Georgia as a state and the insatiable desire of the Georgian nation to decide its future destiny, and describes the political situation of that time. In addition to its declarative nature, the declaration also has a purely normative character. It has a constitutional-legal nature - from May 26, 1918, until the adoption of the Constitution in 1921, it became the primary source of the legal situation of that time. It defines the legal status of the state, the scope and extent of jurisdiction, the form of the political system, the main directions of foreign policy, the provisional state authorities and the highest governing bodies that are supposed to ensure the state of the country.

The declaration was ratified by the Constituent Assembly of Georgia, the directly elected legislative body, on May 12, 1919.

The original copy of the declaration is kept by the National Archives of Georgia.

== Background ==
The Russian Revolution had seen the Caucasus region establish an independent state on 22 April 1918, the Transcaucasian Democratic Federative Republic (TDFR), a union of Armenia, Azerbaijan, and Georgia. However it only lasted until 26 May 1918, as the Ottoman Empire invaded, and with political and ethnic differences the state was unable to sustain itself. With the Armenians fighting the Ottoman forces and the Azerbaijanis having their own issues with Bolsheviks controlling Baku, the Georgians concluded that they had no future in the TDFR. On 14 May Noe Zhordania, a leading Georgian Menshevik, went to Batumi to request the German Empire's assistance in securing Georgian independence. He returned to Tiflis on 21 May and expressed confidence that Georgia could become independent. The Armenian, Azerbaijani, and Georgian representatives from the Transcaucasian Seim (the TDFR's legislature) met on 21 May to discuss the future of the TDFR and agreed that it was not likely to last much longer. The next day the Georgians met alone and resolved that independence was their only logical choice. Zhordania and Zurab Avalishvili drafted a declaration of independence on 22 May, before Jordania left again for Batumi to meet Otto von Lossow. On 24 May Von Lossow replied that he was only authorized to work with the TDFR as a whole; as it was becoming apparent that it would not last long, he would have to leave Trabzon and consult with his government on how to proceed further.

== Declaration ==
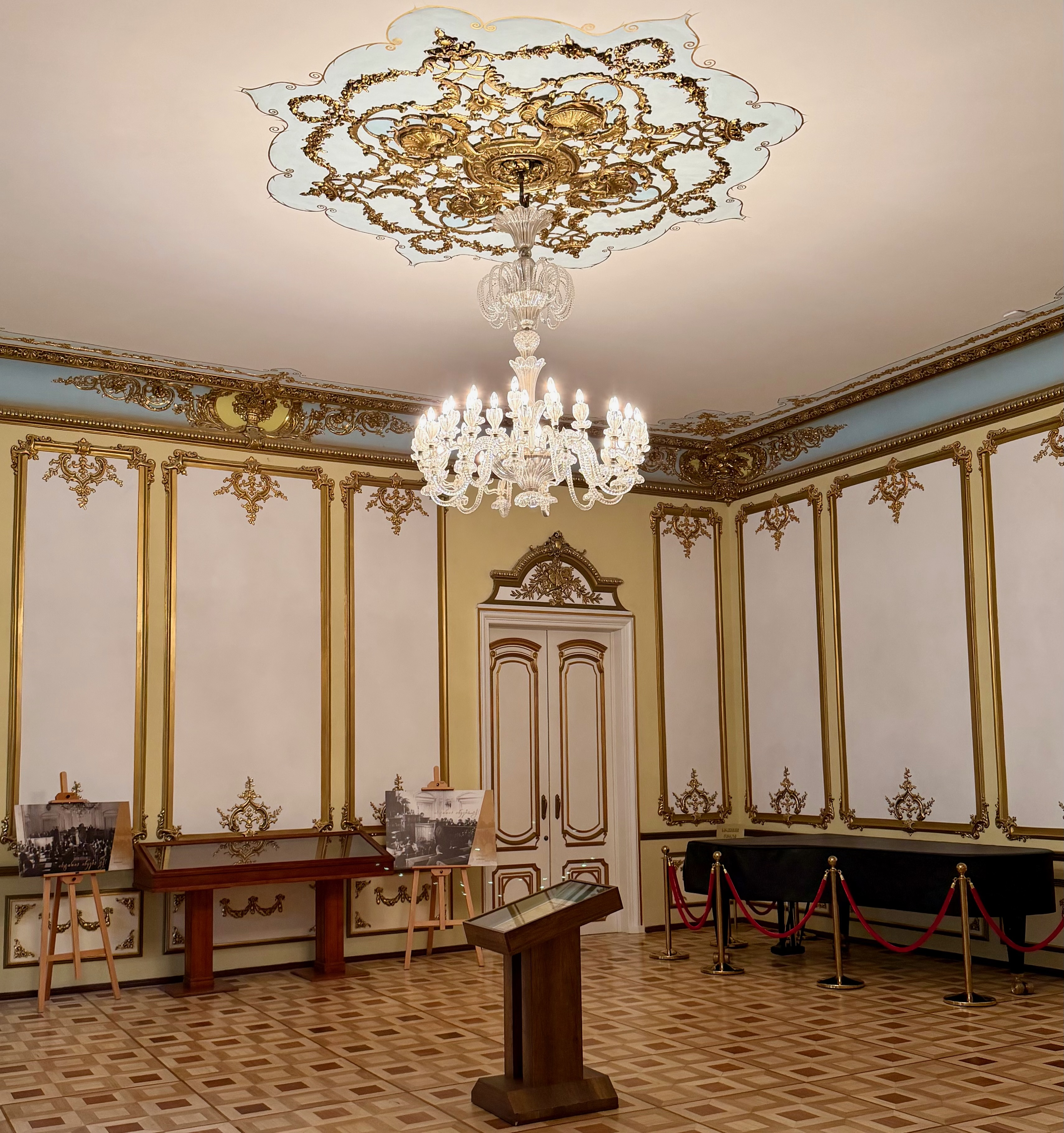
Hall in Tbilisi, where Georgia's independence was proclaimed in 1918

On 26 May Irakli Tsereteli, another leading Menshevik, gave two speeches in the Seim. In the first, he explained that the TDFR was unable to continue as there was a lack of unity among the people and that ethnic strife led to a division of action in regards to the Ottoman invasion. In his second speech, Tsereteli blamed the Azerbaijanis for failing to support the defense of the TDFR and declared that as the federation had failed it was time for Georgia to proclaim itself independent. At 15:00 the motion was passed: "Because on the questions of war and peace there arose basic differences among the peoples who had created the Transcaucasian Republic, and because it became impossible to establish one authoritative order speaking in the name of all Transcaucasia, the Seim certifies the fact of the dissolution of Transcaucasia and lays down its powers." Most delegates left the chamber, with only the Georgians remaining, who were shortly joined by members of the Georgian National Council. Zhordania then read the Georgian declaration of independence and proclaimed the Democratic Republic of Georgia. This was followed two days later with an Armenian declaration of independence, followed quickly by Azerbaijan doing the same, creating the Republic of Armenia and Azerbaijan Democratic Republic, respectively.

== See also ==
- Declaration of State Sovereignty of Georgia

== Bibliography ==
- Kazemzadeh, Firuz (1951), The Struggle for Transcaucasia (1917–1921), New York City: Philosophical Library, ISBN 978-0-95-600040-8
- Hovannisian, Richard G. (1969), Armenia on the Road to Independence, 1918, Berkeley and Los Angeles, California: University of California Press, OCLC 175119194
- Suny, Ronald Grigor (1994), The Making of the Georgian Nation (Second ed.), Bloomington, Indiana: Indiana University Press, ISBN 978-0-25-320915-3
