= Armenian declaration of independence =

Armenian declaration of independence may refer to:

- Declaration of Independence of Armenia (1918)
- Declaration of State Sovereignty of Armenia, 1990
