= Davit Oniashvili =

Georgian politician

- დავით ონიაშვილი (Georgian)
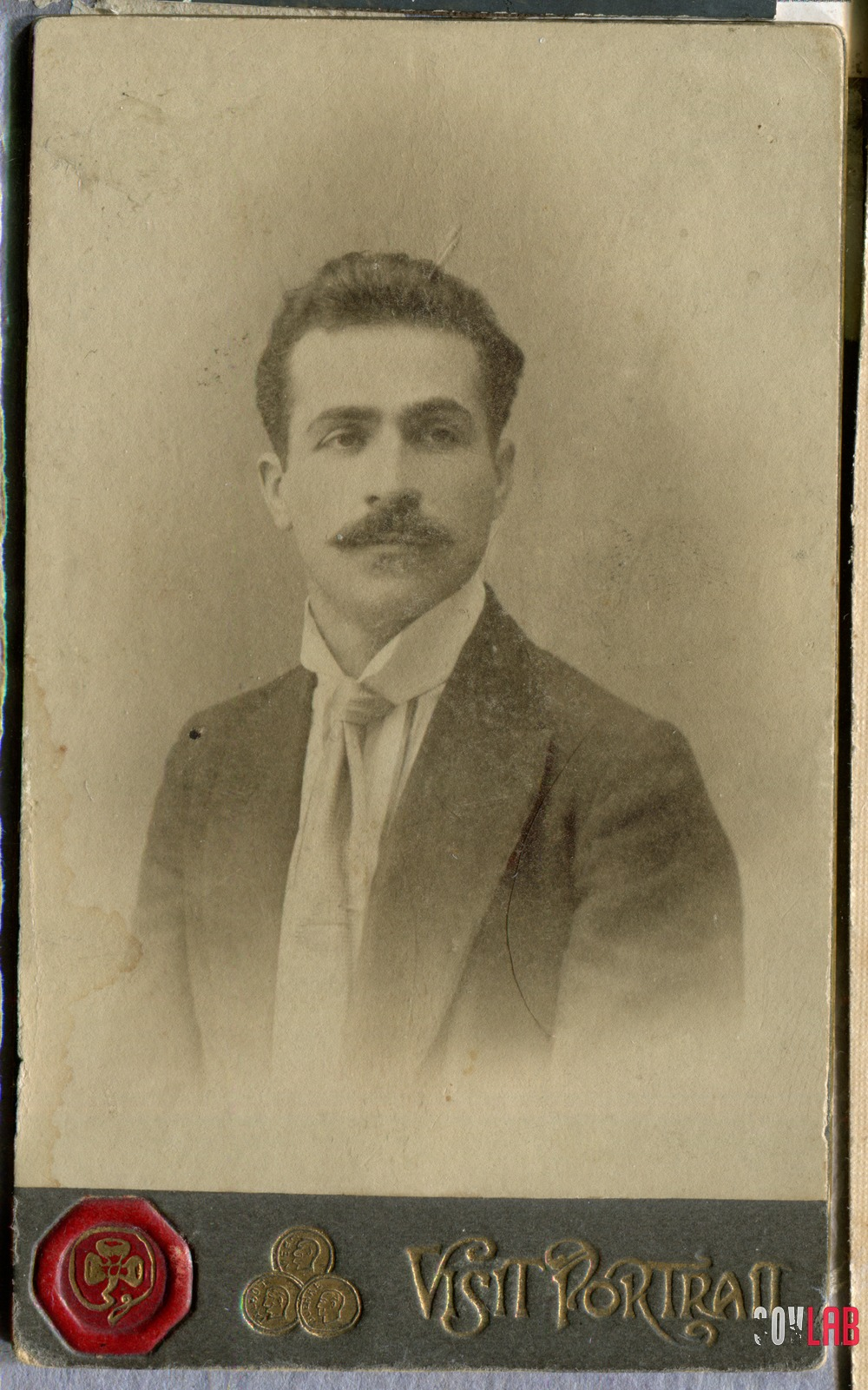

Personal details
- Born: 22 December 1883 Khidistavi, Tiflis Governorate, Russian Empire
- Died: 14 July 1937 (aged 53)
- Party: Social Democratic Party of Georgia

Davit Oniashvili (Georgian: დავით ონიშვილი; 22 December 1883 – 14 July 1937) was a Georgian politician, active in the Democratic Republic of Georgia. He served in the Georgian parliament and as the Minister of Agriculture in the Democratic Republic of Georgia (1918–1921). Prior to that he introduced the order that led to the declaration of independence of the Transcaucasian Democratic Federative Republic on 22 April 1918. He was arrested in 1937 during the Great Purge and shot.

== Bibliography ==
- Hovannisian, Richard G. (1969), Armenia on the Road to Independence, 1918, Berkeley and Los Angeles, California: University of California Press, OCLC 175119194
- Mchedishvili, David A. (2012), დავით ონიაშვილი [davit oniashvili], The Biographical Dictionary of Georgia
