= Tsater =

Tsater Ծաթեր
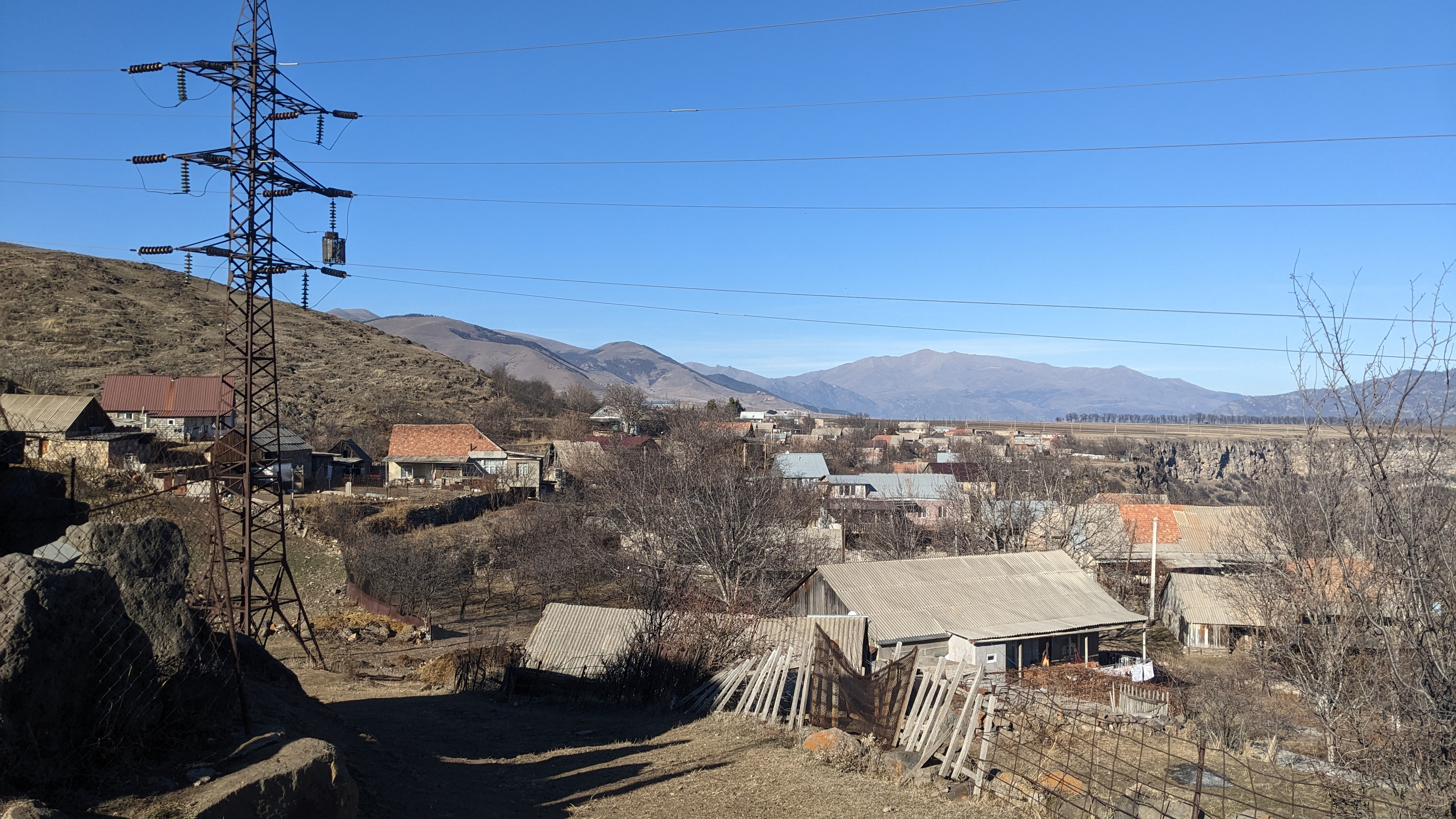

- Location within Armenia
- Coordinates: 40°57′38″N 44°37′46″E
- Country: Armenia
- Province: Lori
- Elevation: 1,200 m (3,900 ft)

Population (2011)
  - Total: 377
- Time zone: UTC+4 (AMT)

Tsater (Armenian: Ծաթեր) is a village in the Lori Province of Armenia.

== Historical heritage sites ==
There is a small St. Astvatsatsin Church on the southern edge of the village with a bell tower which was used as an electrical substation in Soviet times. About 750 m north of the village, abutting the cliff is a small Chgnavor chapel of the 11-12th century.

== Gallery ==
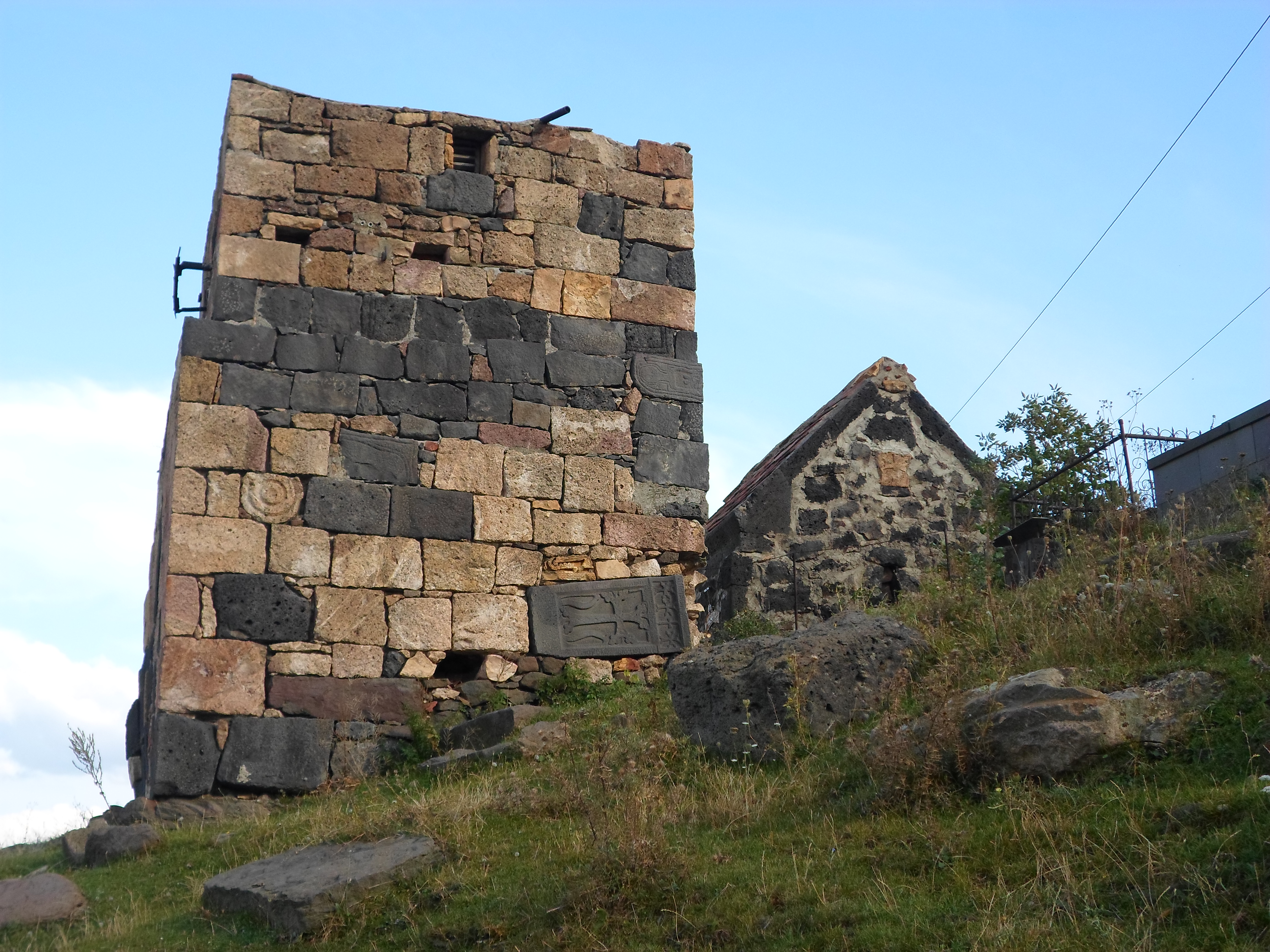

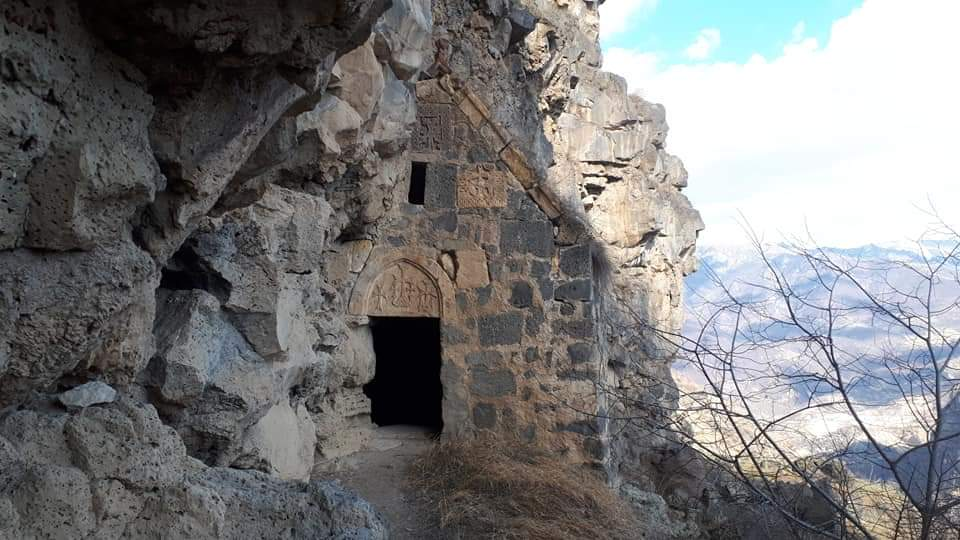

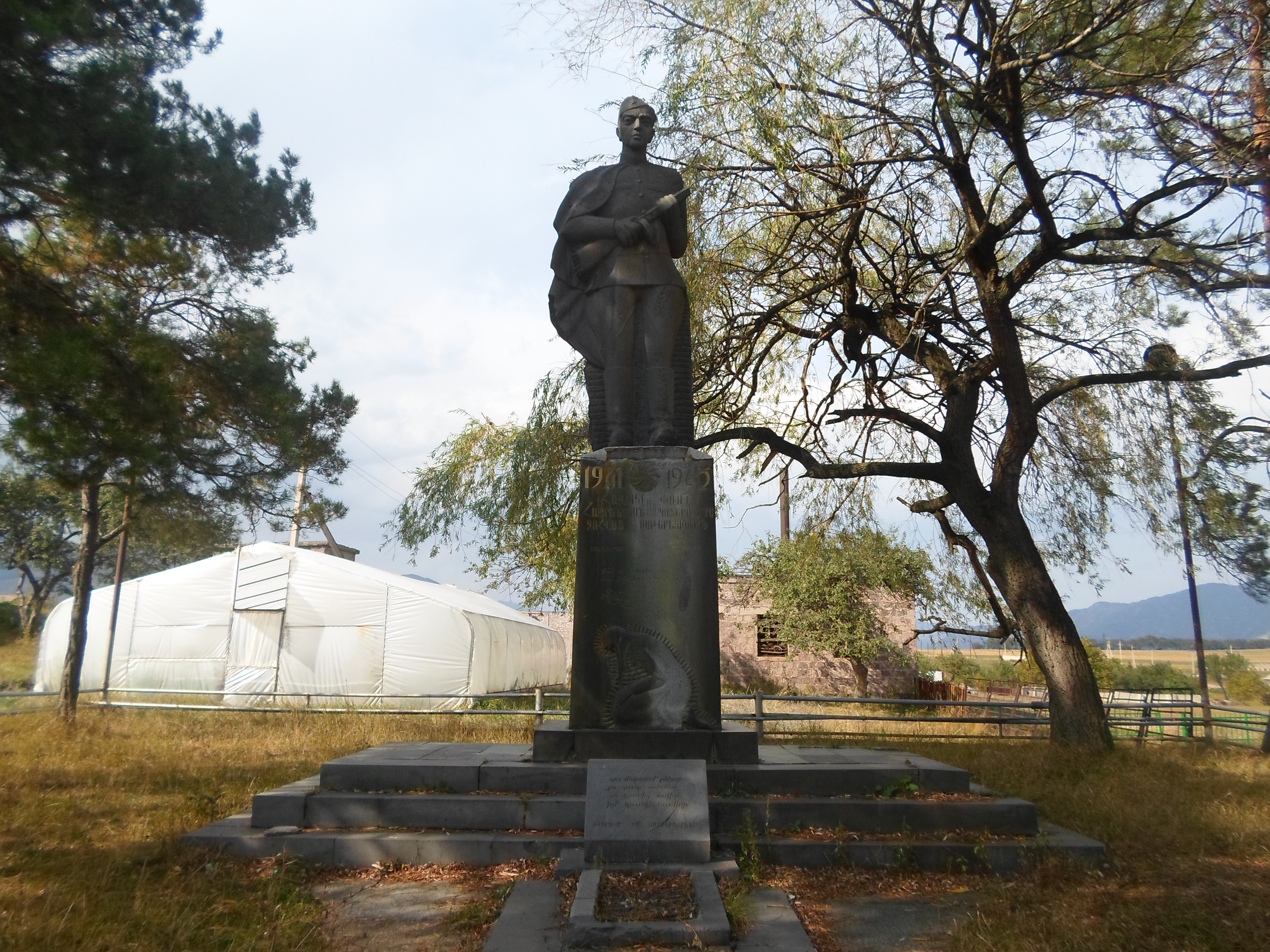
