= Mamai, Armenia =

Mamai
- Location within Armenia Location within Tavush
- Coordinates: 41°17′02″N 44°48′50″E
- Country: Armenia
- Marz (Province): Tavush

Government
- Time zone: UTC+4 ( )
  - Summer (DST): UTC+5 ( )

Mamai (also Mamay; formerly Kirovka) is a town in the Tavush Province of Armenia near the border to Georgia.
