= Hrach Bartikyan =

Armenian historian of medieval Armenia (1927–2011)

- Born: July 7, 1927; Athens, Greece
- Died: August 17, 2011 (aged 84); Yerevan, Armenia
- Education: Yerevan State University
- Awards: Aristotle University of Thessaloniki Medal, President's Prize (Armenia)
- Scientific career
- Fields: Armenian studies, Byzantine studies
- Workplaces: Armenian Academy of Sciences, Greek Academy of Sciences

Hrach Mikayeli Bartikyan (Armenian: Հրաչ Միքայելի Բարթիկյան; Russian: Грaч Миха́йлович Бартикян, also transliterated as Hratch Bart'ikyan; July 7, 1927–August 17, 2011) was an Armenian historian and specialist in Byzantine and medieval Armenian studies. The author of over 200 books, articles and monographs, Bartikyan was a full member of the Armenian Academy of Sciences and the head of its Medieval Studies department. He was also a member of several academic institutions, including the Greek Academy of Sciences, the Tiberian Academy of Rome, the Byzantine Studies Association of Greece, and is an honorary member of the Greek Civilization Establishment.

== Life ==
=== Education ===
Born in Athens, Greece, Bartikyan attended a gymnasium, graduating in 1945. A year later, his family repatriated to the Soviet Armenia. He enrolled in the history program at Yerevan State University, obtaining his degree in 1953 and subsequently finding work at the Institute of History at the Armenian Academy of Sciences. In 1972, he received his Doktor nauk.

=== Career ===
Bartikyan's research focused on social movements and political and cultural relations between Armenians and the Byzantine Empire during the Middle Ages. A number of his articles centered on the Paulician and Tondrakian heretical sects and connections between medieval Armenian and Byzantine Greek literature. In the 1960s, he laid the groundwork for a translation project that aimed to translate important medieval Byzantine sources relating to Armenia and Armenians (part of the more general Foreign Sources on Armenia and Armenians project [Otar Aghbyurnere Hayastani yev hayeri masin]). Bartikyan translated and wrote the introductions to select excerpts from Procopius's (The Wars of Justinian, 1967; The Secret History, 1987), Constantine VII Porphyrogenitus's (De Administrando Imperio, 1970), John Scylitzes's (Synopsis of Histories, 1979) and Theophanes the Confessor's (Chronicle, 1984) histories. Bartikyan also translated the twelfth-century Armenian chronicler Matthew of Edessa from classical to modern Eastern Armenian.

In addition to being a contributor to several chapters in the Armenian Academy of Sciences' eight-volume History of the Armenian People series (1970-1984), he wrote numerous entries on Byzantine and late medieval Armenian political and military figures, events, regions and cities in the Armenian Soviet Encyclopedia (1974-1986).

Along with fellow Soviet Byzantine scholars such as Alexander Kazhdan, Bartikyan was a regular participant to international conferences and medievalists' congresses. In April 2005, Bartikyan was awarded the Armenian President's Prize, which is "granted to successful candidates of art, culture and science," in the category of humanities.

== Selected publications ==
- (in Russian) Istochniki dlia izucheniia istorii pavlikanskogo dvizheniia [Sources on the study of the history of the Paulician movement]. Yerevan: Armenian Academy of Sciences, 1961.
- (in Russian) "Zametki o Vizantiiskom epose o Digense Akrite," [Notes on the Byzantine epic Digenis Acritas] Vizantiiskii vremennik 25 (1964).
- (in French) "La généalogie du Magistros Bagarat, Catépan de l'Orient, et des Kékauménos," Revue des Études Arméniennes 2 (1965).
- (in French) "L'enoikion à Byzance et dans la capitale des Bagratides, Ani, à l'époque de la domination byzantine (1045-1064)," Revue des Études Arméniennes 6 (1969).
- (in Armenian) "Hayastani nvachume Byuzandakan kaysrutyan koghmits" [Armenia's annexation by the Byzantine Empire], Patma-Banasirakan Handes 49 (1970).
- (in Greek) Hellenismos kai Armenia. Athens: Hidryma Goulandre-Chorn, 1991.
- "Armenia and Armenians in the Byzantine Epic," in Digenes Akrites: New Approaches to Byzantine Heroic Poetry (Centre for Hellenic Studies, King's College London). David Ricks (ed.) Brookfield, VT: Variorum, 1993 ISBN 0-86078-395-2.
- (in Armenian) Partenios Atenatsu Paghestini Kesariayi metropoliti patmutyun hunats yev hayots taradzaynutyan [Metropolitan of Caesarea in Palestine Parthenius' On the Feuds Between the Orthodox and the Armenians]. Yerevan: Yerevan State University Press, 2005.
