= Mikhayelovka =

Mikhayelovka Միխայելովկա
- Location within Armenia
- Coordinates: 41°09′55″N 44°16′39″E
- Country: Armenia
- Province: Lori
- Elevation: 1,530 m (5,020 ft)

Population (2011)
  - Total: 713
- Time zone: UTC+4 (AMT)

Mikhayelovka (Armenian: Միխայելովկա) is a village in the Lori Province of Armenia.

== History ==
In 1988-1989 Armenian refugees from Azerbaijan settled in the village.
