= Declaration of Independence of Armenia (1918) =

Armenian Declaration of Independence
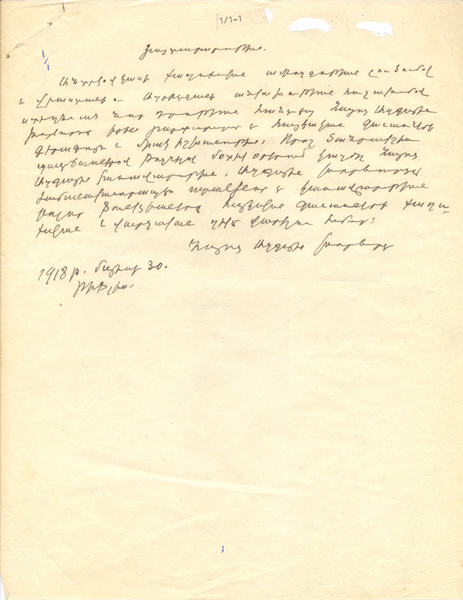
- Original title: Հայաստանի Անկախության Հռչակագիր; Hayastani Ankakhutyan Hrchakagir
- Ratified: 30 May 1918
- Date effective: 28 May 1918
- Location: ARF Archives Institute

The Armenian Declaration of Independence (Armenian: Հայաստանի Անկախության Հռչակագիր, romanized: Hayastani Ankakhutyan Hrchakagir) is the declaration of independence of the Armenian provinces from the Russian Empire. Armenia was proclaimed independent as the First Armenian Republic (following the dissolution of the Transcaucasian Federation) in the former viceroy palace in Tiflis (present-day Tbilisi) on 28 May 1918. The declaration of the independence was as follows:

Declaration

In view of the complete political collapse of the Trans-Caucasus and the new situation created by the proclamation of the independence of Georgia and Azerbaijan, the Armenian National Council declares itself the supreme and sole administration of the Armenian provinces. Due to certain grave circumstances that prevent us from forming an Armenian National Government, the Armenian National Council temporarily assumes all governmental functions in order to pilot the political and administrative leadership of the Armenian provinces.

Armenian National Council

May 30, 1918

== See also ==
- Declaration of State Sovereignty of Armenia
- Declaration of Independence of Azerbaijan
- Georgian Declaration of Independence, 1918
- Armenia

== Bibliography ==
- Azadian, Edmond Y. (1999). History on the Move: Views, Interviews and Essays on Armenian Issues. [s.n.] ISBN 9780814329160.
- Adalian, Rouben Paul (2010). Historical dictionary of Armenia (2nd ed.). Lanham, MD: Scarecrow Press. ISBN 9780810874503.
- "Declaration of Independence (May 30, 1918)". ARF Archives Institute. 31 May 2009. Archived from the original on 25 December 2013.
- de Waal, Thomas (2015). Great Catastrophe: Armenians and Turks in the Shadow of Genocide. Oxford: Oxford University Press. ISBN 978-0-19-935070-4. OCLC 897378977.
