= Zurab Avalishvili =

Georgian historian, jurist, and diplomat

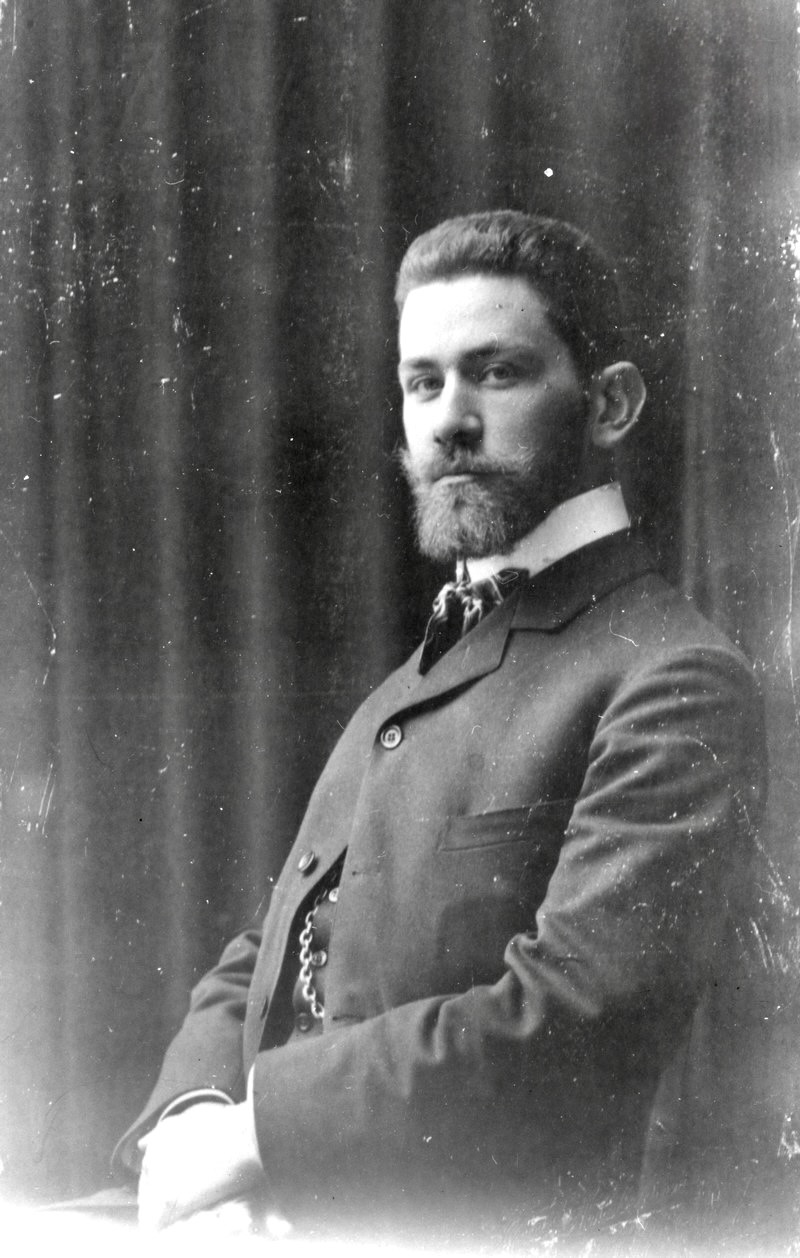
Zurab Avalishvili

Zurab Avalishvili (Georgian: ზურაბ ავალიშვილი; 1876, Tbilisi, Russian Empire – May 21, 1944, Germany) was a Georgian historian, jurist and diplomat in the service of the Democratic Republic of Georgia.

== Biography ==
Avalishvili was born in Tbilisi, Georgia (then part of the Russian Empire), into the Georgian noble family of Prince David Avalishvili. He graduated from St. Petersburg University in 1900 and, from 1900 to 1903, took post-graduate courses at the University of Paris Department of Law. He became a Docent at the St. Petersburg University in 1904 and a Professor of Public Law at the St. Petersburg Polytechnical Institute in 1907. He was an adviser to the Ministry of Trade and Industry of the Russian Empire for many years.

After the February Revolution, Avalishvili was named a Senator by the Provisional Government in May 1917. However, when Georgia declared independence from Russia on May 26, 1918, Avalishvili returned to his homeland and entered the Georgian diplomatic service, becoming Georgia's Deputy Minister of Foreign Affairs. He conducted important diplomatic work for the country as a member of the Georgian delegation to the 1919 Paris Peace Conference.

The Red Army invasion of Georgia forced Avalishvili into exile in March 1921. He lived thereafter in Germany, where he worked as a Professor at the Ludwig-Maximilians-Universität München. He was one of the founding members of the Georgian Association in Germany and worked for the editorial boards of historical journals Georgica (London) and Byzantion (Brussels). He died in 1944 in Germany, but was repatriated and buried at the Didube Pantheon, Tbilisi, in 1994.

== Academic works ==
Avalishvili’s main works focuses on the history of Georgia and the Caucasus, Georgian literature (e.g., the critical studies of Shota Rustaveli), international law and Georgia’s foreign relations. His The Independence of Georgia in International Politics, 1918-1921 is a detailed and well-documented first-hand account of Georgia’s relations with its neighbors, the nation’s struggle for recognition and its international ramifications in the period of 1918 to 1921. Much of the works is in diary form, the author being judiciously critical of ineptitude of the Caucasian governments.

Some of the main works by Zurab Avalishvili include:

- "Joining of Georgia to Russia" (a monograph), St. Petersburg, 1901, 1906 (in Russian)
- "The Independence of Georgia in the International Politics of 1918–1921" (a monograph), Tbilisi, 1925
- "Questions of "The Knight in the Panther's Skin"" (a monograph), Paris, 1931 (in Georgian)
- "Geschichte Georgiens" (a monograph), Munich, 1944 (in German)
- "King Teimuraz I and his work "Martyrdom of Queen Ketevan"" (a monograph), Paris, 1938 (in Georgian)
- "History of the Caucasian Politics" (a monograph).- J. "Kavkaz", Munich, No 35-40, 1936-1937 (in Russian)
- "Geographie et legende dans un ecrit apocriphe de Saint Basile".- J. "Revue de l'Orient Christien", 3 serie, Paris, 1927–28, t. 6 (26), No 3-4 (in French)
- "A fifteenth-century Georgian painting in the Metropolitan Museum".- J. "Georgica", London, vol. 1, No 1, 1935
- "The Cross from Overseas".- J. "Georgica", London, Vol. 1, No 2-3, 1936
- "La succession du Curopalate David d'Iberie, Dynastie de Tao".- J. "Byzantion", Bruxelles, t. 7, 1933 (in French)

== See also ==
- Akaki Chkhenkeli
- Grigol Robakidze
