= Firuz Kazemzadeh =

Russian-born American historian

Firuz Kazemzadeh (Persian: فیروز کاظم‌زاده; October 27, 1924 – May 17, 2017) was a Russian-born American historian who was a professor of history at Yale University. He was also a member of the National Spiritual Assembly of the Baháʼís of the United States.

== Biography ==
Firuz Kazemzadeh was born in Moscow to an Iranian father and a Russian mother. His father served in the Iranian embassy in Moscow. After completing his primary and secondary education in Moscow, Kazemzadeh (then aged 16) and his family moved to Iran. In 1944, during the height of World War II, he travelled from Tehran to the United States and entered Stanford University, graduating with distinction (Phi Beta Kappa) in 1946 and obtaining an MA in 1947. In 1950 Kazemzadeh received a Ph.D. in Russian history from Harvard University.

Kazemzadeh taught at Harvard in 1954 – 1956, then moved to Yale where he was professor of history until his retirement as professor emeritus in 1992. While at Yale, he also served as Master of Davenport College.

He was the author and co-author of a number of books on the history of Russia and Iran, as well as numerous articles and reviews for authoritative scholarly publications.

Between May 15, 1998, and May 14, 2003, Kazemzadeh served as a Commissioner on the United States Commission on International Religious Freedom, first appointed to this position in 1998 by President Bill Clinton, and in 2001, reappointed by US Senate Majority Leader Thomas Daschle.

Kazemzadeh was an adherent of the Baháʼí Faith and, from 1963 to 2000, served as a member of the National Spiritual Assembly of the Baháʼís of the United States. He was also a member of the Baháʼí National Council.

== Publications ==
- Kazemzadeh, Firuz (1947). The struggle for Russian Azerbaijan, 1918-1920. Stanford University.
- Kazemzadeh, Firuz (October 1956). "The Origin and Early Development of the Persian Cossack Brigade". American Slavic and East European Review. 15 (3): 351–363. doi:10.2307/3001099. JSTOR 3001099.
- Kazemzadeh, Firuz (1968). Russia and Britain in Persia, 1864-1914: A Study in Imperialism. Yale Russian and East European studies. Vol. 6. Yale University Press.
- Kazemzadeh, Firuz (1974). "Russian penetration of the Caucasus". In Hunczak, Taras (ed.). Russian Imperialism from Ivan the Great to the revolution. Rutgers University Press. ISBN 978-0-8135-0737-8.
- Kazemzadeh, Firuz (1977). "The Baha'i Faith: A Summary Reprinted from the Encyclopædia Britannica". Reprinted from the Encyclopædia Britannica. National Spiritual Assembly of the Baháʼís of the United States. ISBN 978-0-87743-121-3.
- Kazemzadeh, Firuz; International Communication Agency, Kennan Institute for Advanced Russian Studies (1979). "Russian penetration of the Caucasus". The Caucasus Region and Relations with the Central Government. Occasional papers. Vol. 60. Wilson Center, Kennan Institute for Advanced Russian Studies.
- Kazemzadeh, Firuz (1981). The struggle for Transcaucasia, 1917-1921. Hyperion Press. ISBN 978-0-8305-0076-5.(reprint of 1951 Philosophical Library edition)
- Kazemzadeh, Firuz (1991). "Iranian relations with Russia and the Soviet Union, to 1921". In Avery, P.; Hambly, G. R. G.; Melville, C. (eds.). From Nadir Shah to the Islamic Republic. The Cambridge History of Iran. Vol. 7 illustrated (reprint, reissue ed.). Cambridge University Press. pp. 314–349. ISBN 978-0-521-20095-0.
- Kazemzadeh, Firuz (1994). "Central Asia's Foreign Relation: A Historical Survey". In Starr, S. Frederick (ed.). The Legacy of History in Russia and the New States of Eurasia. M. E. Sharpe. ISBN 9780521200950. Archived from the original on March 8, 2016 – via Questia.
- Kazemzadeh, Firuz (2009). "ʻAbdu'l-Bahá 'Abbás (1844–1921)". Baháʼí Encyclopedia Project. Evanston, IL: National Spiritual Assembly of the Baháʼís of the United States.

== Further research ==
- Firuz Kazemzadeh (March 22, 2016). Interview with Dr. Firuz Kazemzadeh Baha'i Heritage Project (Youtube). Los Angeles, California: Los Angeles Baha'i Center.
