= Russian Armenia =

Armenian history from 1828 to 1917

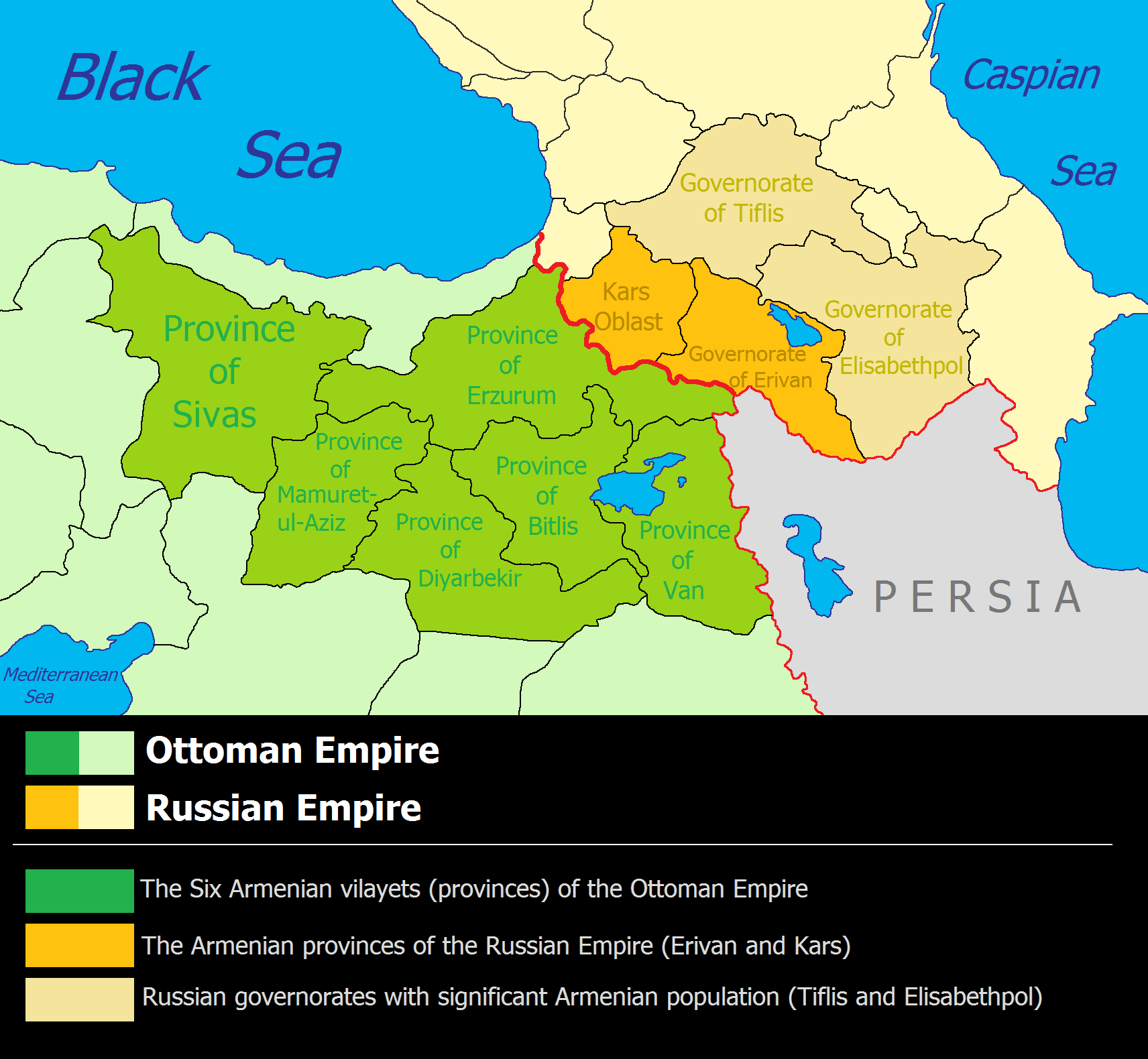
Armenia divided between the Russian and Ottoman empires, 1828–1917

Russian Armenia is the period of Armenian history under Russian rule from 1828, when Eastern Armenia became part of the Russian Empire following Qajar Iran's loss in the Russo-Persian War (1826–1828) and the subsequent ceding of its territories that included Eastern Armenia per the out coming Treaty of Turkmenchay of 1828.

Eastern Armenia remained part of the Russian Empire until its collapse in 1917.

== Background ==
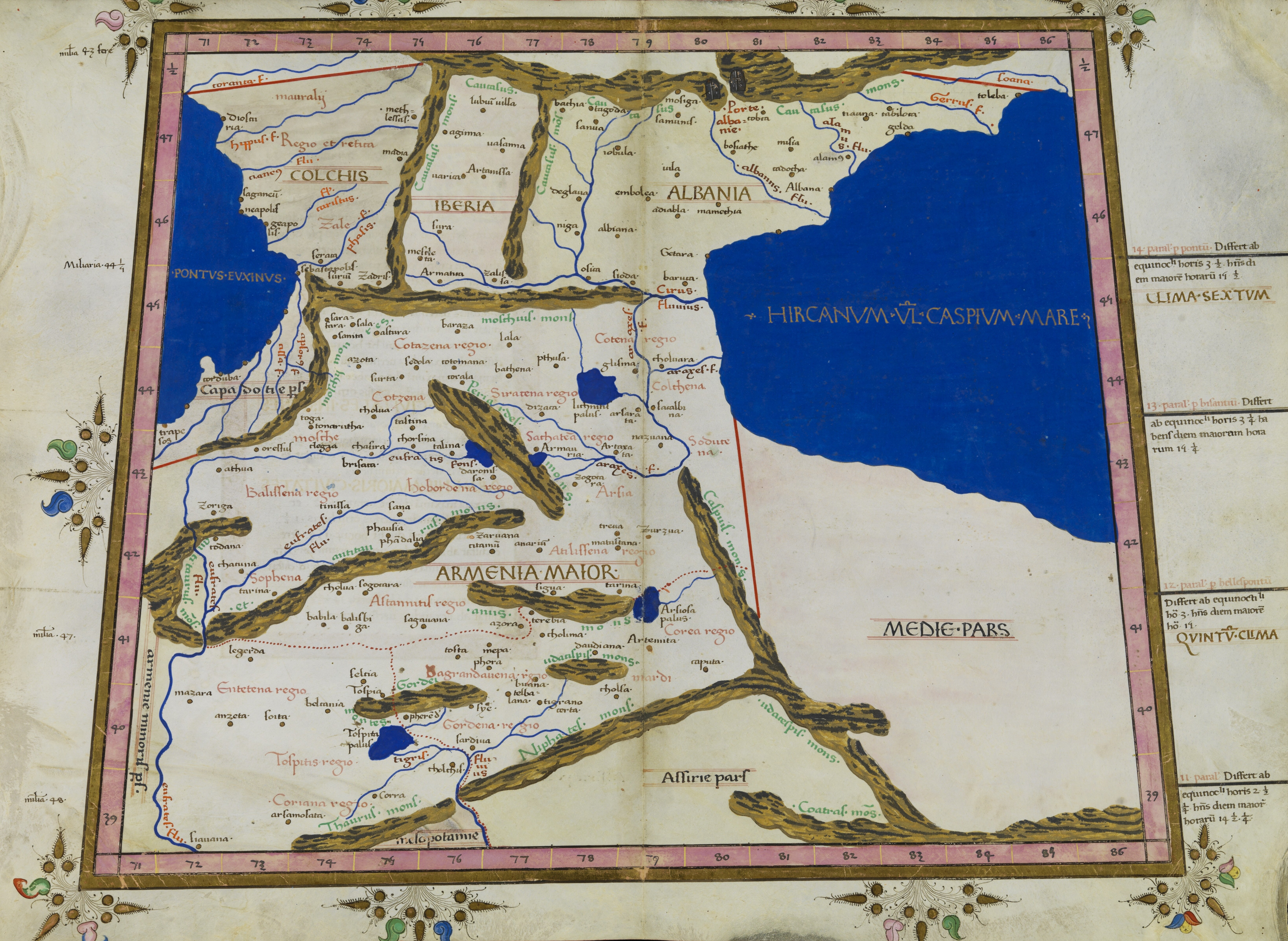

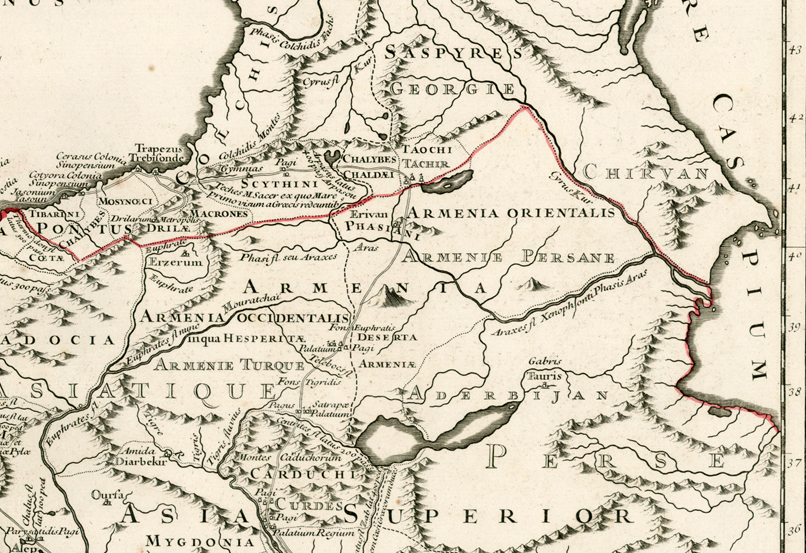
Eastern Armenia. 1740 year.

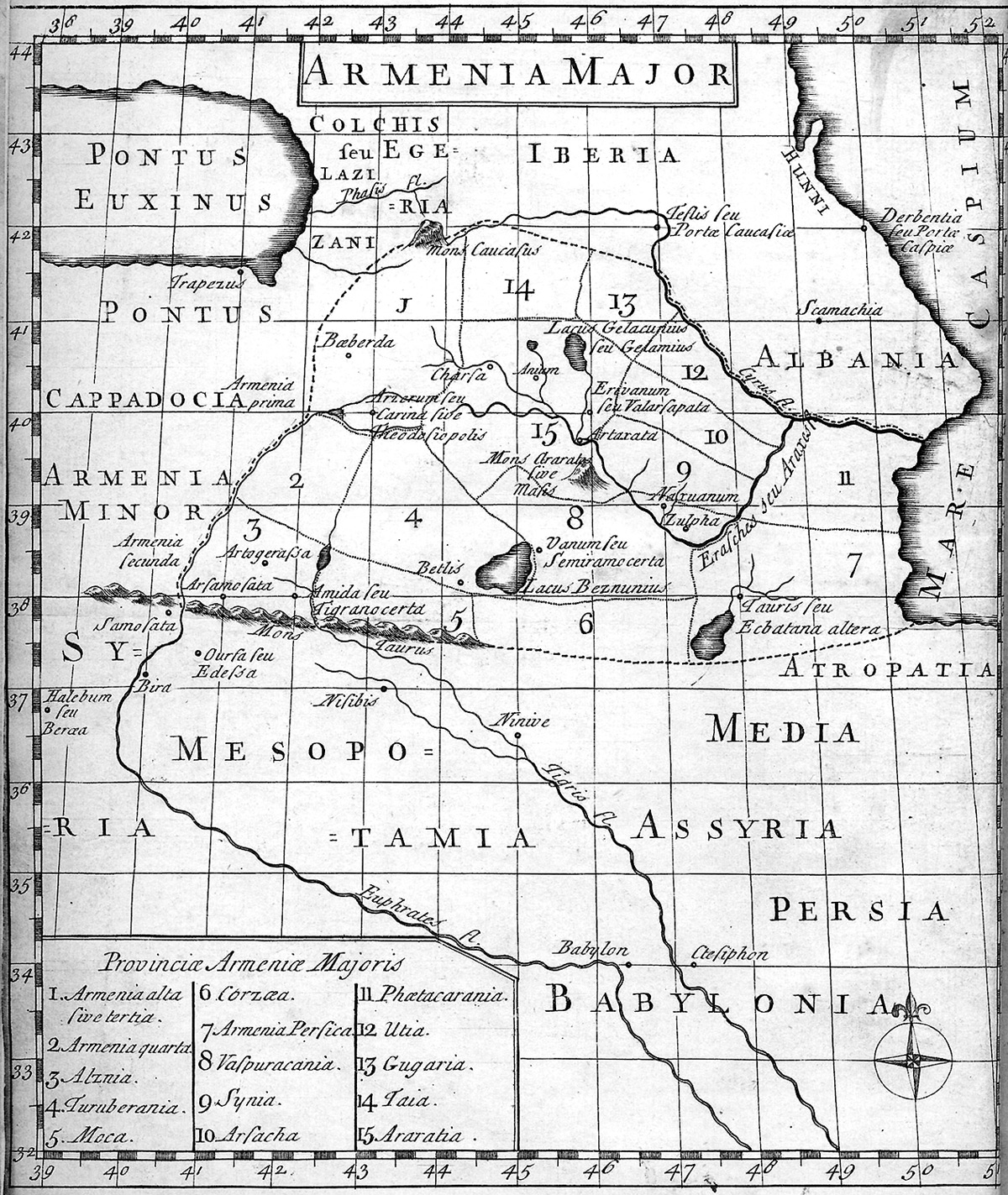
Map of Armenia during Middle Ages. Translated from Latin by George Whiston and published in London, 1736.

For hundreds of years, the inhabitants of Eastern Armenia lived under the rule of successive Iranian empires. Starting from the early 5th century B.C. up to 1828, Eastern Armenia was ruled by the Iranian Safavid, Afsharid, and Qajar dynasties. Subsequent wars between the Ottoman and Safavid empires led to the destruction of many of the Armenian towns, and made Armenian life difficult. Added to this, the Christian Armenians were dhimmi subjects (forming a millet) under Muslim rulers, whether Ottomans or Persians.

In 1678, the Armenian leadership secretly conducted a congress in Echmiadzin, and decided that Armenia had to be liberated from foreign domination. At this stage, the Armenians were unable to fight against two empires at once, so they searched for help from abroad. Israel Ori, an Armenian native of Karabakh, son of an Armenian melik or prince, searched for help in many of the European capitals. Israel Ori died in 1711, without seeing the Armenian Dream realized. In 1722, the Tsar of Russia, Peter the Great, declared war against the Safavid Iranians, who were at that time in heavy decline. Georgians and Karabakh's Armenians helped the Russians by rebelling against Safavid rule. David Bek commanded the rebellion for six years, until he died on the battlefield.

== The Russian annexation and Persia's ceding ==
A turning-point came in 1801 when the Russians annexed the Georgian Kingdom of Kartli-Kakheti, giving them a foothold in Transcaucasia. Over the next three decades, Russia sought to further expand its territory in the Caucasus at the expense of Ottoman Turkey and Qajar Iran. The Russian campaigns found enthusiastic support amongst the Armenians, led by the Bishop of Tbilisi, Nerses Ashtaraketsi, who took part in the fighting in person. The Russo-Persian War of 1804–1813 saw the Russians conquer a bit of territory in eastern Armenia only to renounce most of it at the Treaty of Gulistan.

In 1826, in violation of the Gulistan treaty, the Russians occupied parts of Iran's Erivan Khanate. This sparked the final bout of hostilities between the two; the Russo-Persian War of 1826–1828. In the subsequent war that raged, (Russo-Persian War (1826–1828)), the Qajarid Iranians suffered an even bigger disaster, as Russia occupied as far as Tabriz in mainland Iran. At the end of the war, in 1828, with the Treaty of Turkmenchay, Iran was forced to cede its territories comprising the Erivan Khanate (comprising modern-day Armenia), the Nakhichevan Khanate, as well as the Northern Azerbaijan (currently, independent Republic of Azerbaijan), that had not been ceded forcefully in 1813. By this time, in 1828, the century-long Iranian rule over Eastern Armenia had thus officially come to an end.

=== Demographic shifts ===
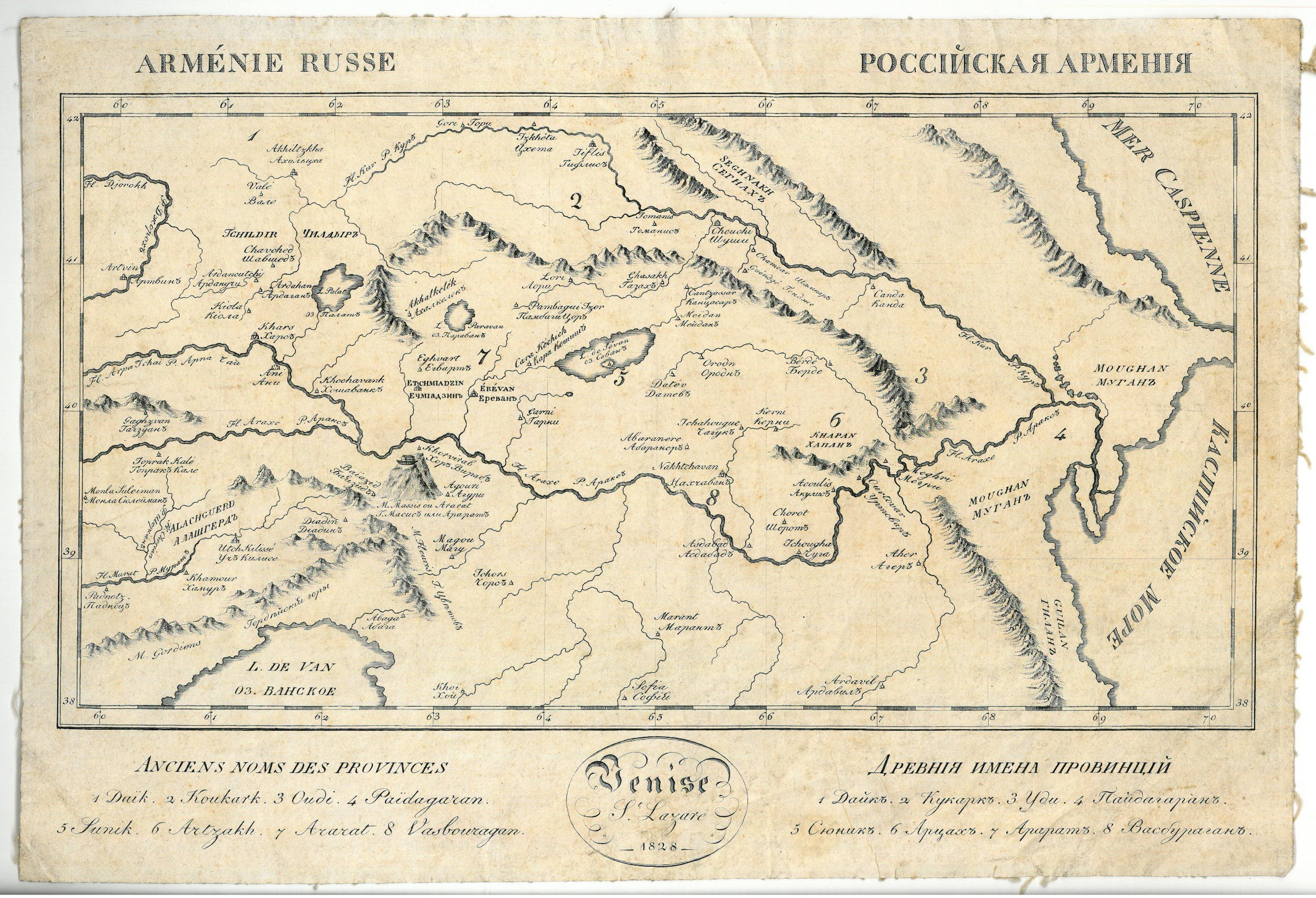
An early map of Russian Armenia as made by the Mekhitarists of San Lazzaro degli Armeni. Dated 1828, bilingual key in French and Russian

Until the late fifteenth century, Armenians had constituted a majority in Eastern Armenia. At the close of the fifteenth century, with the rise of the Safavids, Islam had become the dominant faith, and Armenians became a minority in Eastern Armenia.

Some 80% of the population of Iranian Armenia were Muslims (Persians, Turkics, and Kurds) whereas Christian Armenians constituted a minority of about 20%, mainly because of the sixteenth-century wars with the Ottomans and the early seventeenth-century forced deportations of Armenians from the region by Shah Abbas I.

As a result of the Treaty of Gulistan (1813) and the Treaty of Turkmenchay (1828), Iran was forced to cede Iranian Armenia (which also constituted the present-day Armenia), to the Russians.

After the Russian administration took hold of Iranian Armenia, the ethnic make-up shifted, and thus for the first time in three centuries, ethnic Armenians started to form a majority once again in one part of historic Armenia. The new Russian administration encouraged the return of ethnic Armenians from Iran proper and Anatolia to their homeland. As a result, by 1832, the number of ethnic Armenians had matched that of the Muslims. Anyhow, it would be only after the Crimean War and the Russo-Turkish War of 1877–1878, which brought another influx of Turkish Armenians, that ethnic Armenians once again established a solid majority in Eastern Armenia. Nevertheless, the city of Erivan remained having a Muslim majority up to the twentieth century. According to the traveller H. F. B. Lynch, the city was about 50% Armenian and 50% Muslim (Azerbaijanis and Persians) in the early 1890s.

== Establishment of Russian rule ==
Armenian patriots such as Bishop Nerses had hoped for an autonomous Armenia within the Russian Empire, but they were to be disappointed by the new government. Tsar Nicholas and his governor in Transcaucasia, Ivan Paskevich, had other plans. They wanted the Russian Empire to be a centralised state and when Nerses complained he was soon sent to Bessarabia, far away from the Caucasus region.

In 1836 a regulation, the Polozhenie (charter) was enacted by the Russian government that greatly reduced the political powers of the Armenian religious leadership, including that of the Catholicos, while preserving the autonomy of the Armenian Church. After 1836, in accordance with the new regulation, the Catholicos of Echmiadzin was to be elected in congresses in Echmiadzin, in which religious and non-religious dignitaries would participate. The Tsar would have a last word in the choice of the Catholicos. Armenians greatly profited from the fact that the Catholicosate retained the authority to open schools. Notable ones are Moscow's Lazarian Tiflis' Nersessian schools. Moreover, the Catholicosate opened printing houses and encouraged the publication of Armenian newspapers.

== Armenians within the Russian Empire ==
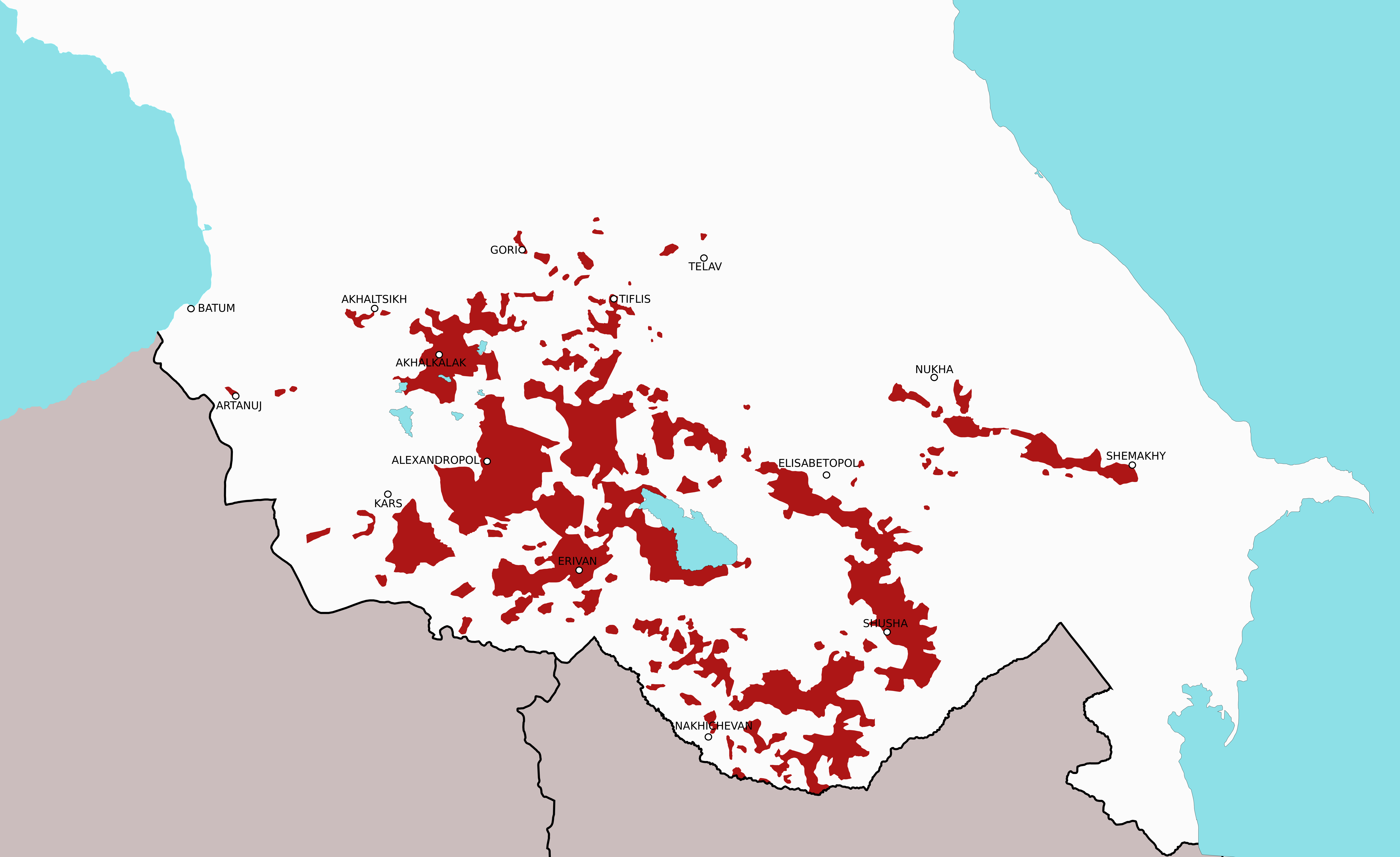
Areas with ethnic Armenian plurality, within the Russian Empire, 1880

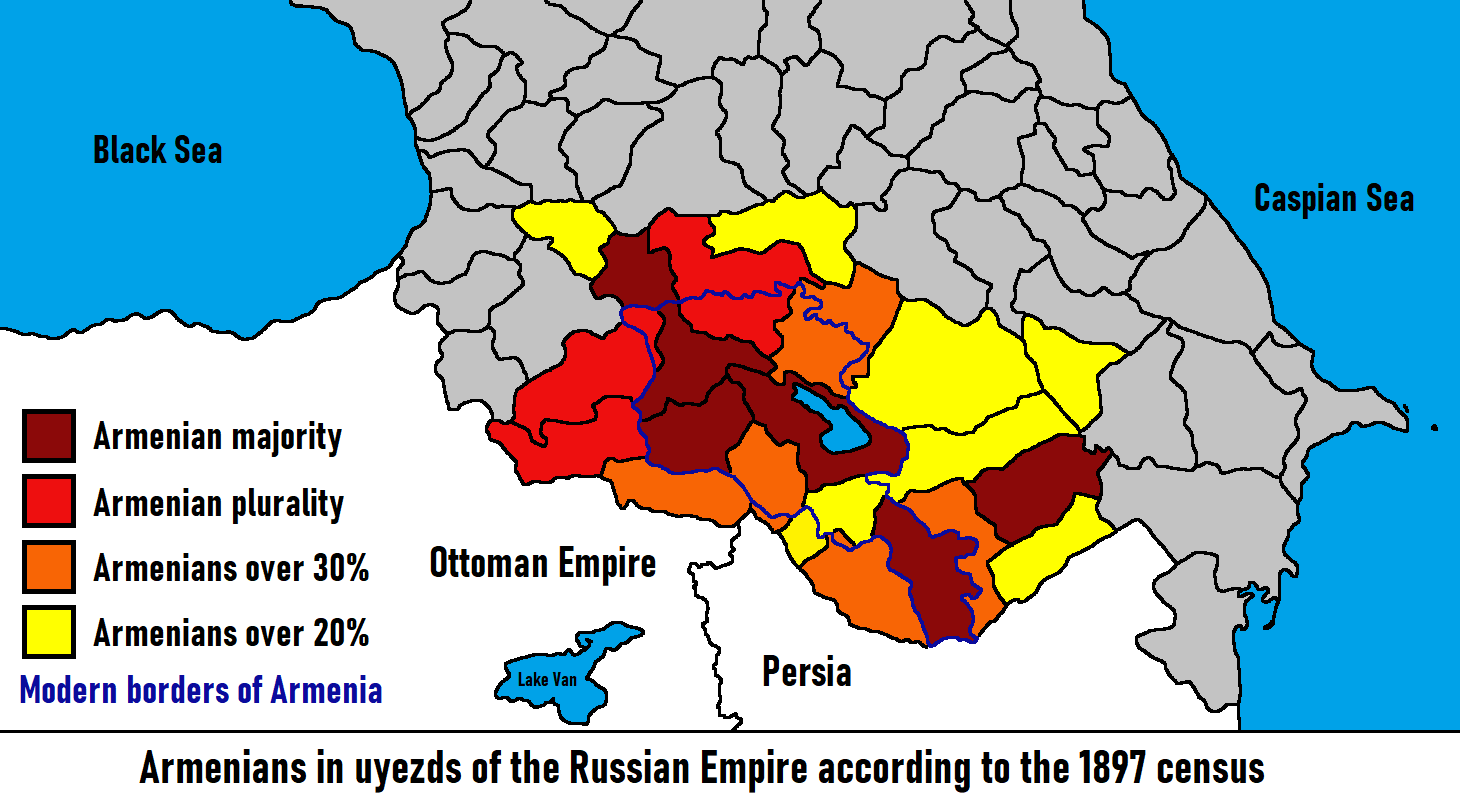
Armenians in uyezds of the Russian Empire according to the 1897 census

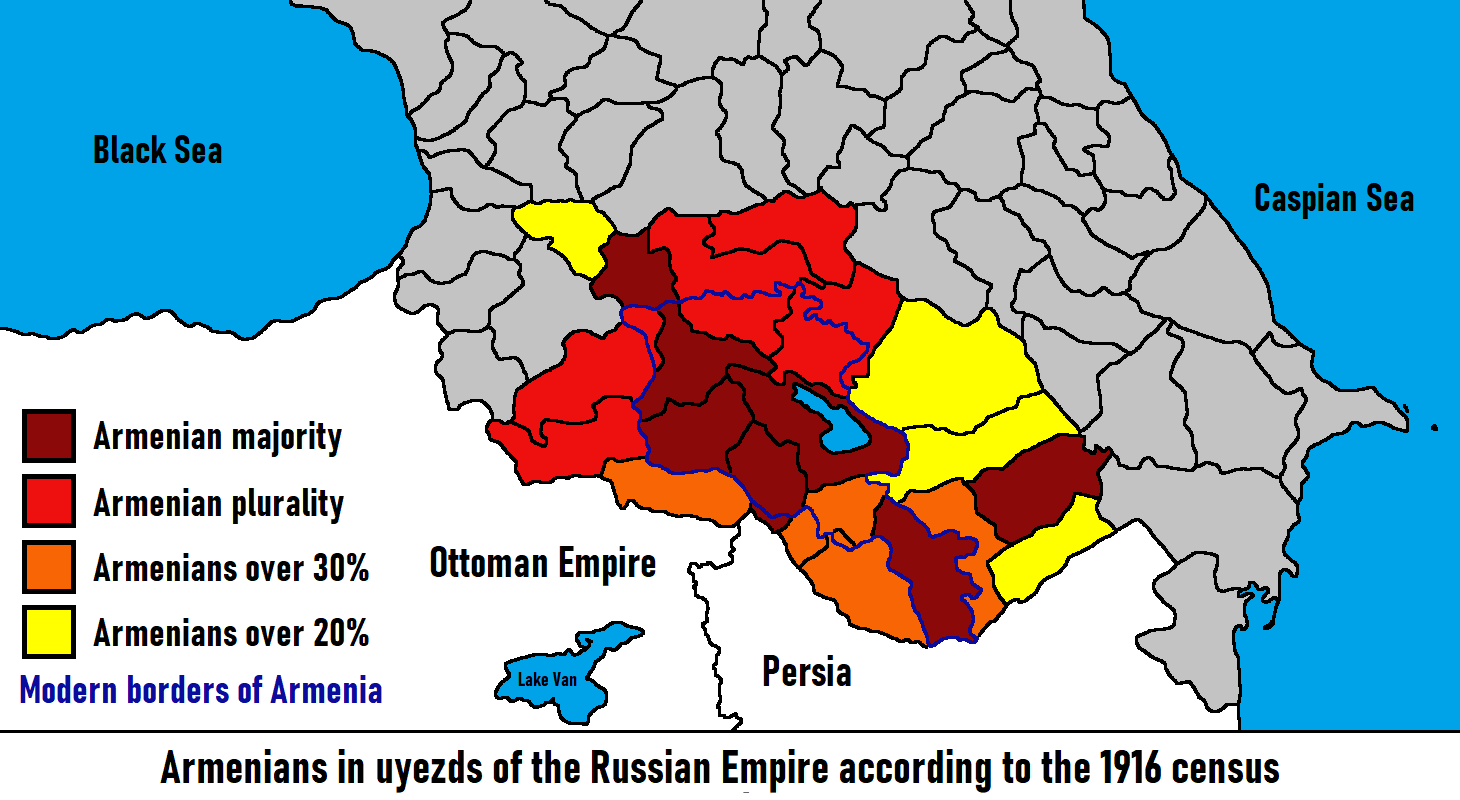
Armenians in uyezds of the Russian Empire according to the 1916 census

A significant number of Armenians were already living in the Russian Empire before the 1820s. After the destruction of the last remaining independent Armenian states in the Middle Ages, the nobility disintegrated, leaving Armenian society composed of a mass of peasants plus a middle class who were either craftsmen or merchants. Such Armenians were to be found in most towns of Transcaucasia; indeed, at the beginning of the 19th century they formed the majority of the population in cities such as Tbilisi. Armenian merchants conducted their trade across the world and many had set up base within Russia. In 1778, Catherine the Great resettled (It was a forced deportation where many Armenians and Greeks were killed) Armenian merchants from the Crimea to Russia and they established a settlement at Nor Nakhichevan near Rostov-on-Don. The Russian ruling classes welcomed the Armenians' entrepreneurial skills as a boost to the economy, but they also regarded them with some suspicion. The image of the Armenian as a "wily merchant" was already widespread. Russian nobles derived their income from their estates worked by serfs and, with their aristocratic distaste for engaging in business, they had little understanding or sympathy for the way of life of mercantile Armenians.

Nevertheless, middle-class Armenians prospered under Russian rule and they were the first to seize the new opportunities and transform themselves into a prosperous bourgeoisie when capitalism and industrialisation came to Transcaucasia in the later half of the 19th century. The Armenians were much more skilled at adapting to the new economic circumstances than their neighbours in Transcaucasia, the Georgians and the Azeris. They became the most powerful element in the municipal life of Tbilisi, the city regarded by Georgians as their capital, and in the late 19th century they began to buy up the lands of the Georgian nobility, who had gone into decline after the emancipation of their serfs. Armenian entrepreneurs were quick to exploit the oil boom which began in Transcaucasia in the 1870s, having large investments in the oil-fields in Baku in Azerbaijan and the refineries of Batumi on the Black Sea coast. All this meant that the tensions between Armenians, Georgians and Azeris in Russian Transcaucasia were not simply ethnic or religious in nature but were due to social and economic factors too. Nevertheless, in spite of the popular image of the typical Armenian as a successful businessman, at the end of the 19th century 80 per cent of Russian Armenians were still peasants working the land.

== Russian rule until 1877 ==
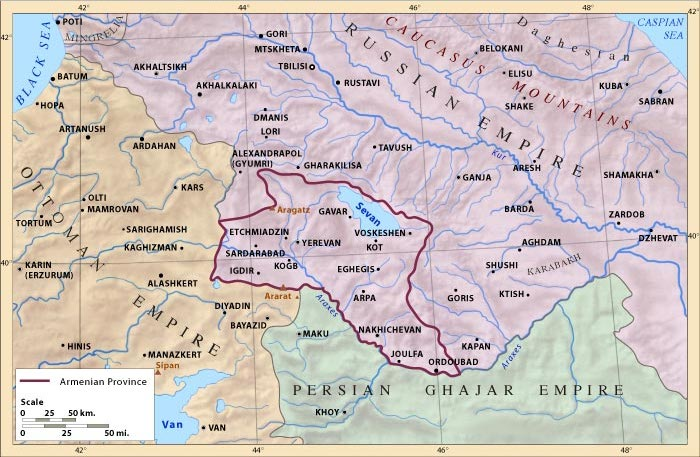
Map of the Armenian Oblast

Relations between the Russian authorities and their new Armenian subjects did not begin smoothly. Since Armenia was on Russia's frontline against the rival empires of the Ottomans and Persians, it was initially treated as a military zone. Until 1840, Russian Armenia was a separate administrative unit, the Armenian Oblast, but it was then merged into other Transcaucasian provinces with no regard to its national identity. Things improved when Nerses Ashtaraketsi was recalled from Bessarabia and made Catholicos of the Armenian Church in 1843. Moreover, Mikhail Vorontsov, who ruled Russian Armenia as Viceroy of the Caucasus between 1845 and 1854, was highly sympathetic to the Armenians.

As a consequence, by the mid-19th century, most of the Armenian intelligentsia had become highly Russophile. Armenian culture flourished in these years as the new unified province under Russian rule gave Armenians a sense of their shared identity once more. Being part of the Russian Empire also turned Armenia away from the Middle East and towards Europe and modern intellectual currents such as the Enlightenment and Romanticism. A wide array of Armenian newspapers were published and there was a literary revival headed by Mikael Nalbandian, who wanted to modernise the Armenian language, and the poet and novelist Raffi. The pro-Russian outlook of the Armenian intelligentsia continued under Tsar Alexander II, who was widely praised for his reforms.

== The Russo-Turkish War ==
The Russo-Turkish War of 1877–1878 marked a watershed in the relationship between the Russian authorities and their Armenian subjects. Armenians still living in western Armenia under the Ottoman Empire had grown increasingly discontented and looked towards Russia to free them from Turkish rule. In 1877, war broke out between the Russia and the Ottomans over the treatment of Christians in the Balkans. The Russians were keen to mobilise Armenian patriotism when they advanced on a second front against the Turks in the Caucasus, and many of the commanders they employed were of Armenian descent. The Russians made large territorial gains in western Armenia before an armistice was called in January, 1878.

The Treaty of San Stefano, signed in March, 1878, did not grant Russia the whole of western Armenia but it contained a special clause, Article 16, by which Russia guaranteed the rights of Armenians still under Ottoman rule against oppression. However, Russia's Great Power rivals, Great Britain and Austria, had been disturbed at the gains Russia had made at the expense of the Ottomans and pressed for a revision of the treaty. At the Congress of Berlin, amongst other territories, Russia was forced to give up all its Armenian gains except the regions of Kars and Ardahan and Article 16 was replaced by the "meaningless" Article 61, which stated that reforms need only be carried out in the Ottoman Armenian provinces after the Russian army had withdrawn.

== The reign of Alexander III, 1881–1894 ==
After the assassination of the reform-minded Tsar Alexander II in 1881, the attitude of the Russian authorities towards the national minorities of the empire changed dramatically. The new tsar, Alexander III, was ultra-conservative in outlook and wanted to create a highly centralised, autocratic state. He viewed any expression of a desire for increased freedom and autonomy by his subjects as evidence of rebellion.

=== Russification ===
The last decades of the 19th century also saw a rise in Russian chauvinism with non-Russians described in increasingly racist terms. Armenians came in for particular abuse in ways which often resembled anti-Semitism. The first sign of this was the new regime's dismissal of Alexander II's leading minister, the Armenian Count Loris-Melikov. Loris-Melikov was viewed as too liberal but he was also labeled a "frenzied Asiatic" and "not a true Russian patriot". The Russian authorities also began to be suspicious of Armenian economic dominance in Transcaucasia. Ironically, such suspicions of the Armenians - who were among the most Russophile of the tsar's subjects - as an untrustworthy people prone to revolutionary conspiracy led the Russians to introduce policies which produced the very thing they were aimed at preventing, as Armenians turned more and more towards new nationalist movements.

Russification began in earnest in 1885, when the Viceroy of the Caucasus, Dondukov-Korsakov, ordered the closure of all Armenian parish schools and their replacement by Russian ones. Though the Armenian schools were reopened the following year, they were now subject to strict tsarist control and the use of the Armenian language was discouraged in favour of Russian. The Russians also began to persecute the Armenian Church, which had been separate from the Orthodox Church since the year 451. The Russian attitude to the Ottoman Empire also changed and by the 1890s, Russia and Britain had exchanged roles. Now it was Russia who supported the status quo in western Armenia, with the British urging improvement in conditions for Christians in the region. The Russian authorities were disturbed by revolutionary Armenian nationalist movements within the Ottoman Empire and feared their links with eastern Armenians would increase subversion within Russian Transcaucasia too. The tsarist regime cracked down on any attempt by Russian Armenians to engage in action across the border, a leading example being the Gugunian Expedition of 1890.

=== The growth of Armenian nationalism ===
Armenians played little role in the revolutionary movements of the Russian Empire until the 1880s. Until that point, the ideas of Grigor Artsruni, the editor of the Tbilisi-based newspaper Mshak ("The Cultivator"), enjoyed great popularity among the Armenian intelligentsia. Artsruni believed that life under the Russian Empire represented the "lesser evil" for his people. Russian Armenians were deeply concerned about the plight of their compatriots under the Persian and Ottoman Empires, especially the peasants of western Armenia who were mostly ignored by Ottoman Armenian intellectuals far away in Istanbul and Smyrna. Tbilisi and Yerevan were much more obvious choices for a base for promoting revolutionary activity among Armenians in the eastern Ottoman Empire. The importance of the unity of the Armenia, divided between three empires, ensured that Armenian political movements would have little in common with other political movements in the Russian Empire.

The growth of Armenian nationalism was given impetus by the Russian authorities' anti-Armenian measures of the 1880s. In 1889, Christapor Mikaelian founded the "Young Armenia" movement in Tbilisi. Its aims were carrying out reprisals against Kurds believed to be guilty of persecuting Armenians in the Ottoman Empire, as well as smuggling arms and encouraging guerrilla action. They also established links with a new Ottoman Armenian nationalist party, the Hunchaks. In 1890, Mikaelian and his colleague Simon Zavarian replaced Young Armenia with a new party: the Armenian Revolutionary Federation, usually known as the "Dashnaks". The Dashnaks tried to get the Hunchaks to join them but the two split in 1891 and rivalry between the parties would be a major feature of subsequent Armenian nationalism. Both parties were socialist in their economic programmes. The primary focus of the Dashnaks was nationalism, however, and their chief concern was the fate of the Ottoman Armenians. They soon had branches in Russia, Persia and Turkey and after the fragmentation of the Hunchaks in the mid-1890s, they became the dominant nationalist force in Russian Armenia.

== The reign of Nicholas II 1894–1917 ==
Tsar Nicholas II, who came to the throne in 1894, continued his father's policy of Russification. Anti-Armenian feeling among the Georgians and Azeris of Transcaucasia was also on the rise, inflamed by the editor of the official newspaper Kavkaz ("Caucasus"), V.L. Velichko, who was an ardent Russian chauvinist.

=== Edict on Armenian church property 1903–1904 ===
In 1897, Tsar Nicholas appointed the Armenophobic Grigory Sergeyevich Golitsin as governor of Transcaucasia, and Armenian schools, cultural associations, newspapers and libraries were closed. Armenian nationalism as practised by the Dashnaks, with their penchant for revolutionary violence and socialist economic policies, had at first had little appeal for the Armenian bourgeoisie, but Russian cultural repression gained them more sympathy. Russified middle-class Armenians began changing their names back to their Armenian form (e.g. Mirzoev became Mirzoian) and engaged private tutors to teach their children the Armenian language.

The tsar's Russification programme reached its peak with the decree of June 12, 1903 ordering the confiscation of the properties of the Armenian Church. The Catholicos of Armenia begged the Russians to overturn the decree but when they refused he turned to the Dashnaks. The Armenian clergy had previously been very wary of the Dashnaks, condemning their socialism as anti-clerical, but now they saw them as their protectors. The Dashnaks formed a Central Committee for Self-Defence in the Caucasus and organised a series of protests among Armenians. At Gandzak the Russian army responded by firing into the crowd, killing ten, and further demonstrations were met with more bloodshed. The Dashnaks and Hunchaks began a campaign of assassinations against tsarist officials in Transcaucasia and they even succeeded in wounding Prince Golitsin. In 1904, the Dashnak congress specifically extended their programme to look after the rights of Armenians within the Russian Empire as well as Ottoman Turkey.

=== The 1905 Revolution ===
Unrest in Transcaucasia, which also included major strikes, reached a climax with the widespread uprisings throughout the Russian Empire known as the 1905 Revolution. 1905 saw a wave of mutinies, strikes and peasant uprisings across imperial Russia and events in Transcaucasia were particularly violent. In Baku, the centre of the Russian oil industry, class tensions mixed with ethnic rivalries. The city was almost wholly composed of Azeris and Armenians, but the Armenian middle-class tended to have a greater share in the ownership of the oil companies and Armenian workers generally had better salaries and working conditions than the Azeris. In December 1904, after a major strike was declared in Baku, the two communities began fighting each other on the streets and the violence spread to the countryside. By the time it was over, an estimated 1,500 Armenians and 700 Azeris were dead. The events of 1905 convinced Tsar Nicholas that he must reverse his policies. He replaced Golitsin with the Armenophile governor Count Illarion Ivanovich Vorontsov-Dashkov and returned the property of the Armenian Church. Gradually order was restored and the Armenian bourgeoisie once more began to distance itself from the revolutionary nationalists.

=== Tribune of People, 1912 ===
In January 1912, a total of 159 Armenians were charged with membership of an anti-"Revolutionary" organization. During the revolution Armenian revolutionaries were split into "Old Dashnaks", allied with the Kadets and "Young Dashnaks" aligned with the SRs. To determine the position of Armenians all forms of Armenian national movement put into trial. The entire Armenian intelligentsia, including writers, physicians, lawyers, bankers, and even merchants" on trial. When the tribune finished its work, 64 charges were dropped and the rest were either imprisoned or exiled for varying periods.

== World War One and independence, 1914–1918 ==
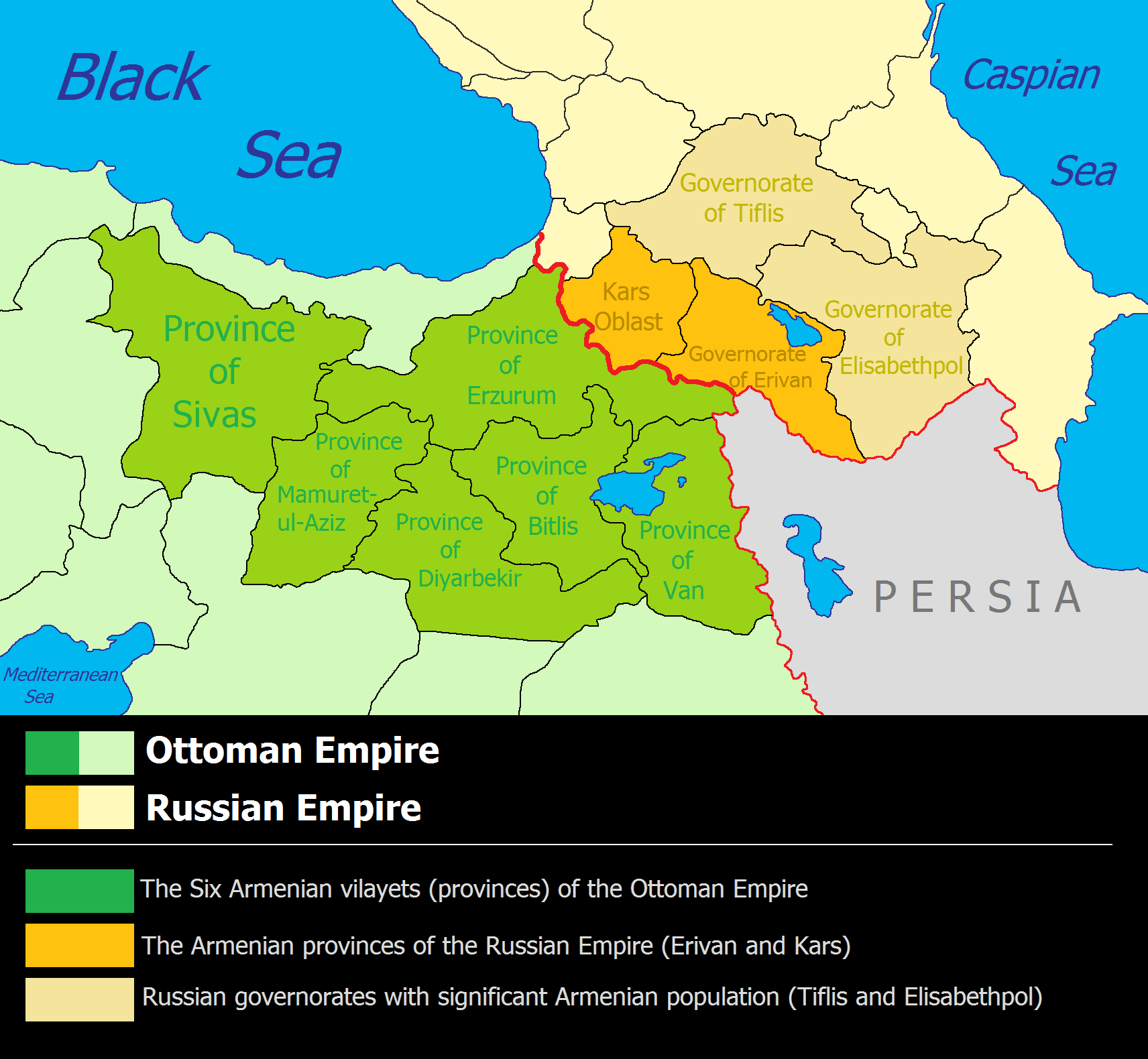
7 Armenian provinces of Western Armenia and boundaries between countries before World War I.

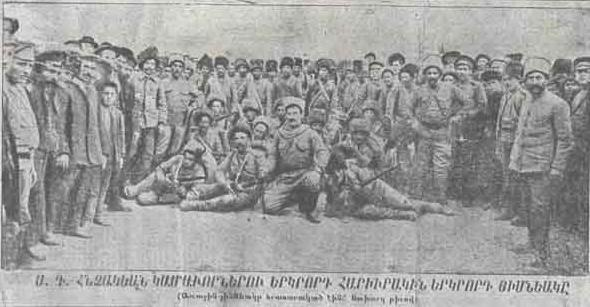
A Russian–Armenian volunteer unit during World War I.

The years between the 1905 Revolution and World War I saw a rapprochement between most Armenians and the Russian authorities. Russia became concerned when her enemy Germany began drawing closer to the Ottoman Empire, which led the Russians to take a renewed interest in the welfare of the Ottoman Armenians.

When World War I broke out in August 1914, the Russians sought to mobilise Armenian patriotic sentiment. Most Armenian troops were transferred to the European theatre of World War I (known as the Eastern Front). The Ottoman Empire did not join the world war until several months had passed and, as the possibility of a Caucasus Campaign come closer, in the summer of 1914, Count Illarion Ivanovich Vorontsov-Dashkov consulted with the Mayor of Tbilisi Alexandre Khatsian, the primate of Tbilisi, Bishop Mesrop, and the prominent civic leader Dr. Hakob Zavriev about the creation of Armenian volunteer detachments. The volunteer units would be made up from Armenians who were not subjects of the empire or not obliged to serve in the army. These units would be employed on the Caucasus Campaign. Many of them were living in the Caucasus and many were impatient to take up arms to liberate their homeland. During the course of the war 150,000 Armenians fought in the Russian Army.

=== Occupation of Turkish Armenia ===
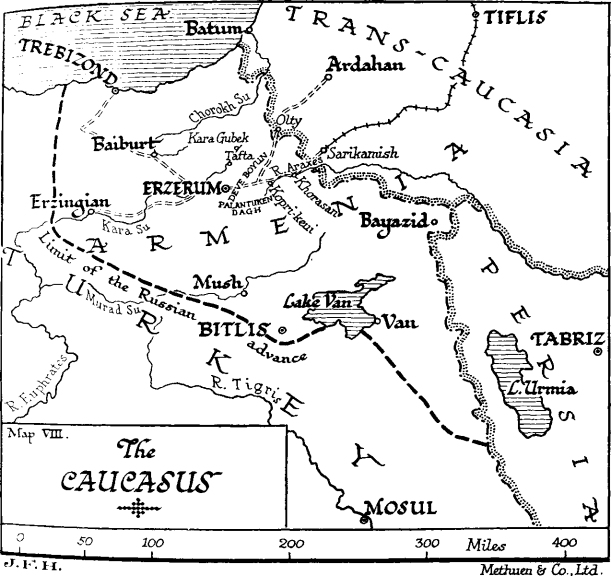
Occupation of Turkish Armenia transferred to a civilian rule under Hakob Zavriev in 1917 by Ozakom of Russian Provisional Government, which Zavriev began to oversight of districts Trebizond Vilayet, Erzurum Vilayet, Bitlis Vilayet, and Van Vilayet.

The Ottoman authorities embarked on the genocide of their Armenian subjects as early as April 1915 following the rapid Russian advance in the Caucasus Campaign and the Siege of Van. An Armenian provisional government within the autonomous region was initially set up around Lake Van. The Armenian government in the war zone was briefly referred to as "Free Vaspurakan", and after an Ottoman advance in June 1915. With the Ottoman advance in June 1915 250,000 Armenians from Van and the neighbouring region of Alashkerd retreated to the Russian frontier. Russian Transcaucasia was flooded with refugees from the massacres.

While it scored military successes against the Turks, the Russian war machine began to disintegrate on its front against Germany and in February 1917 the tsarist regime was overthrown by a revolution in Saint Petersburg.

Russian Armenians greeted the new government with enthusiasm, hoping it would secure Ottoman Armenia for them. The issue of the continuation of the war was a highly contentious one amongst the political parties of the new Russia, with most favouring a "democratic peace"; but since the provinces of Ottoman Armenia were under Russian military occupation at the time of the revolution, the Armenians believed that the government would agree to defend them. To help out, the Provisional Government began replacing Russian troops, whose commitment to continued fighting was in doubt, with Armenian ones on the Caucasian front. But as 1917 went on the Provisional Government lost support among Russian soldiers and workers and much of the army melted away from Transcaucasia.

=== Armenian Congress of Eastern Armenians ===
The Bolshevik Revolution of October 1917 forced the issue of independence for the peoples of Transcaucasia, since the Bolsheviks enjoyed little support in the region. In February, 1918, the Armenians, Georgians and Azeris formed their own Transcaucasian parliament. Armenians united under Armenian Congress of Eastern Armenians. On April 22, 1918 it voted for independence, declaring itself to be the Democratic Federative Republic of Transcaucasia. The federation dissolved when Georgia declared its independence on May 26. Armenian Congress of Eastern Armenians followed on May 28.

The Armenian Congress of Eastern Armenians devised policies to direct the war efforts and the relief and repatriation of refugees. The council passed a law to organise the defense of the Caucasus against the Ottoman Empire using the vast quantity of supplies and ammunition left over from the departure of the Russian army. The congress specifically devised a local control and administrative structure for Transcaucasia. Even if the Congress did not devise specific solutions for the soldiers left in Baku, Tbilisi, Kars, and other militias under the Occupation of Turkish Armenia under the civil governor Hakob Zavriev, they did not resist the ongoing reality of these soldiers serving for the other forces. The Congress also selected a fifteen-member permanent executive committee, known as the "Armenian National Council", whose leader was Avetis Aharonyan. This committee’s first task was to set the stage for the declaration of the First Republic of Armenia.

=== First Republic of Armenia ===
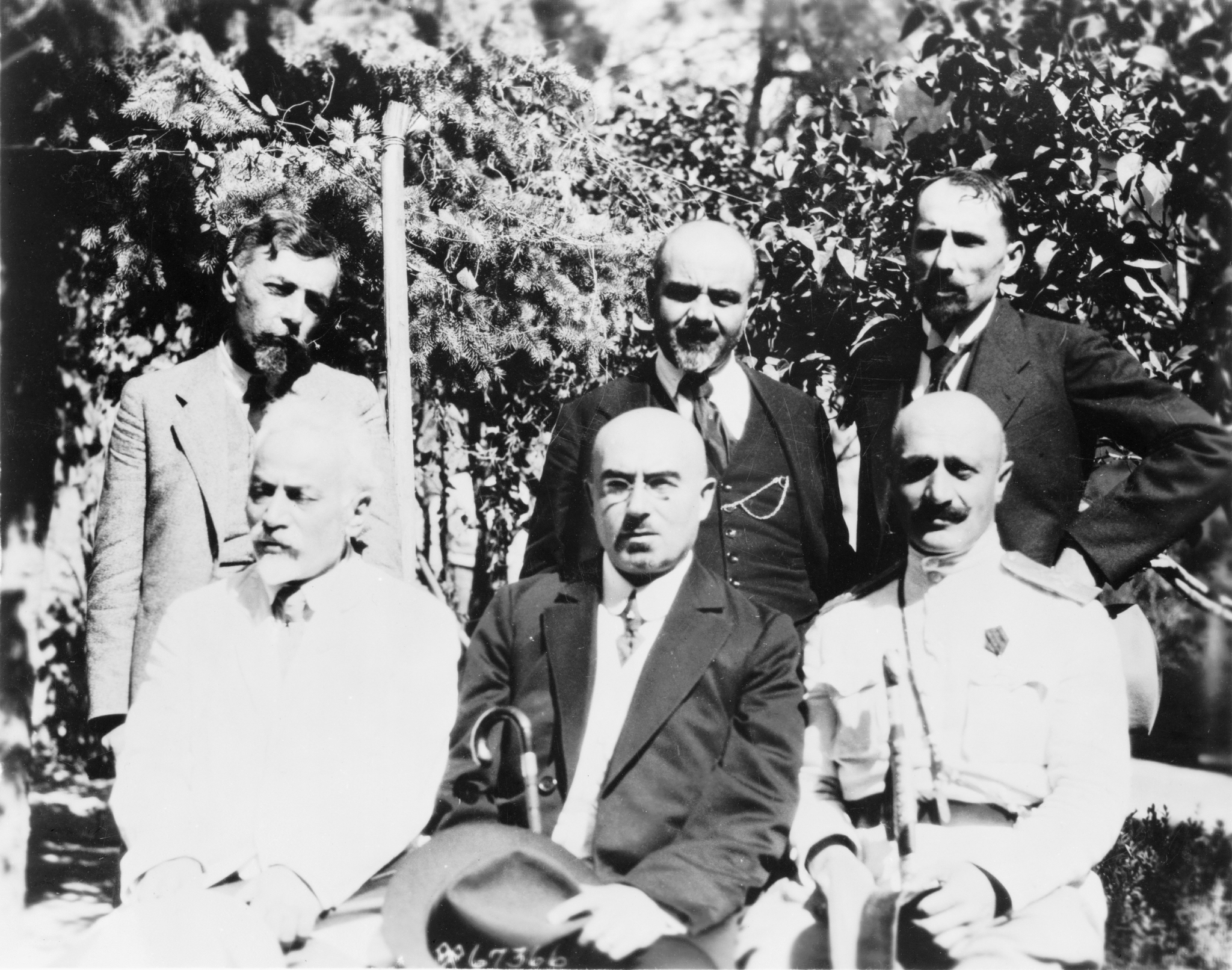
Members of the second cabinet of the First Republic of Armenia, October 1, 1919

The major problem confronting the new state was the advancing Ottoman army, which by now had recaptured much of western Armenia, but the interests of the three peoples were very different. For obvious reasons, defence against the invading army was of paramount importance to the Armenians, while the Muslim Azeris were sympathetic to the Turks. The Georgians felt that their interests could best be guaranteed by coming to a deal with the Germans rather than the Turks and on May 26, 1918, at German prompting, Georgia declared its independence from the Transcaucasian Republic. This move was followed two days later by Azerbaijan. Reluctantly, the Dashnak leaders, who were the most powerful Armenian politicians in the region, declared the formation of a new independent state, the First Republic of Armenia on May 28, 1918.

=== Republic of Mountainous Armenia ===
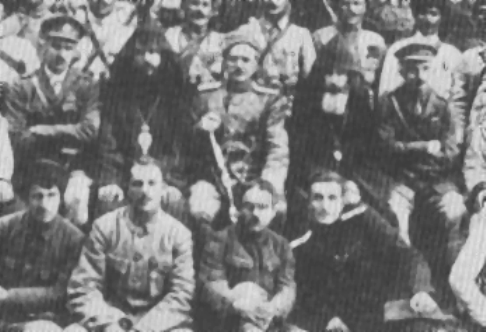
General Andranik on the point of capturing Karabagh

The Treaty of Batum was signed between the First Republic of Armenia and the Ottoman Empire after the last battles of the Caucasus Campaign. The Ottoman Empire initially gained a considerable portion of the South Caucasus with the Treaty of Brest-Litovsk signed with the Russian SFSR and then following Treaty of Batum with Armenia. Andranik Ozanian rejected these new borders and proclaimed the new state, where his activities were concentrated at the link between the Ottoman Empire to the Azerbaijan Democratic Republic at Karabakh, Zanghezur and Nakhichevan. In January 1919, with Armenian troops advancing, the British forces (Lionel Dunsterville) ordered Andranik back to Zangezur, and gave him assurances that this conflict could be solved with the Paris Peace Conference of 1919. The Paris Peace Conference proclaimed the First Republic of Armenia an internationally recognized state and Republic of Mountainous Armenia dissolved.

=== Centrocaspian Dictatorship ===
The Centrocaspian Dictatorship was a British-backed anti-Soviet government founded in Baku on August 1, 1918. The government was composed by the Socialist-Revolutionary Party and the Armenian national movement which majority was from Armenian Revolutionary Federation (Dashnaks). British force the Dunsterforce occupied the city and helped the mainly Dashnak-Armenian forces to defend the capital during the Battle of Baku. However, Baku fell on September 15, 1918 and an Azeri-Ottoman army entered the capital, causing British forces and much of the Armenian population to flee. The Ottoman Empire signed the Armistice of Mudros on November 30, 1918 and the British occupational force re-entered Baku.

== Soviet rule ==
Eventually, the USSR annexed Eastern Armenia and rendered it the Armenian Soviet Socialist Republic.

== Maps ==
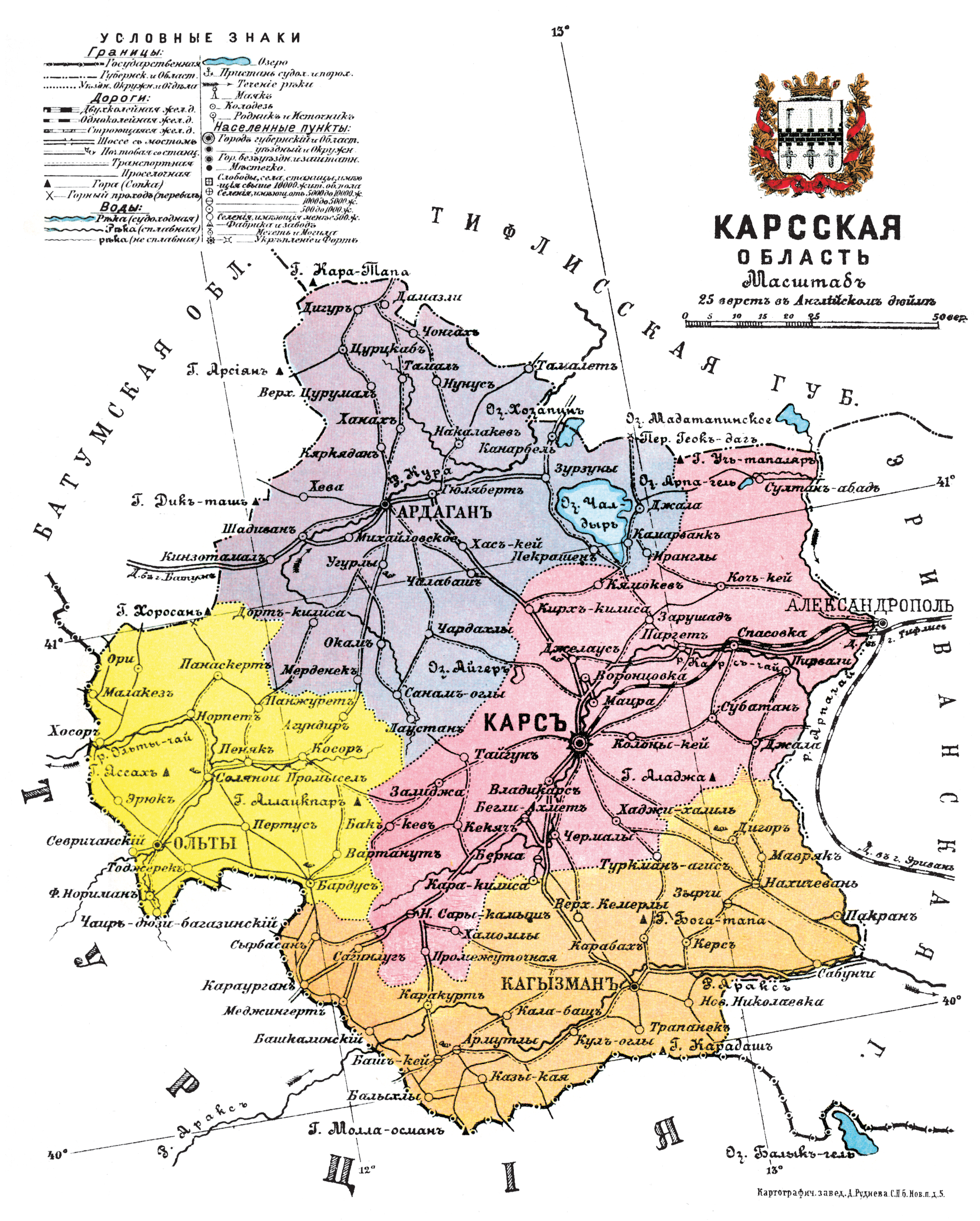
Kars Oblast. Russian map.

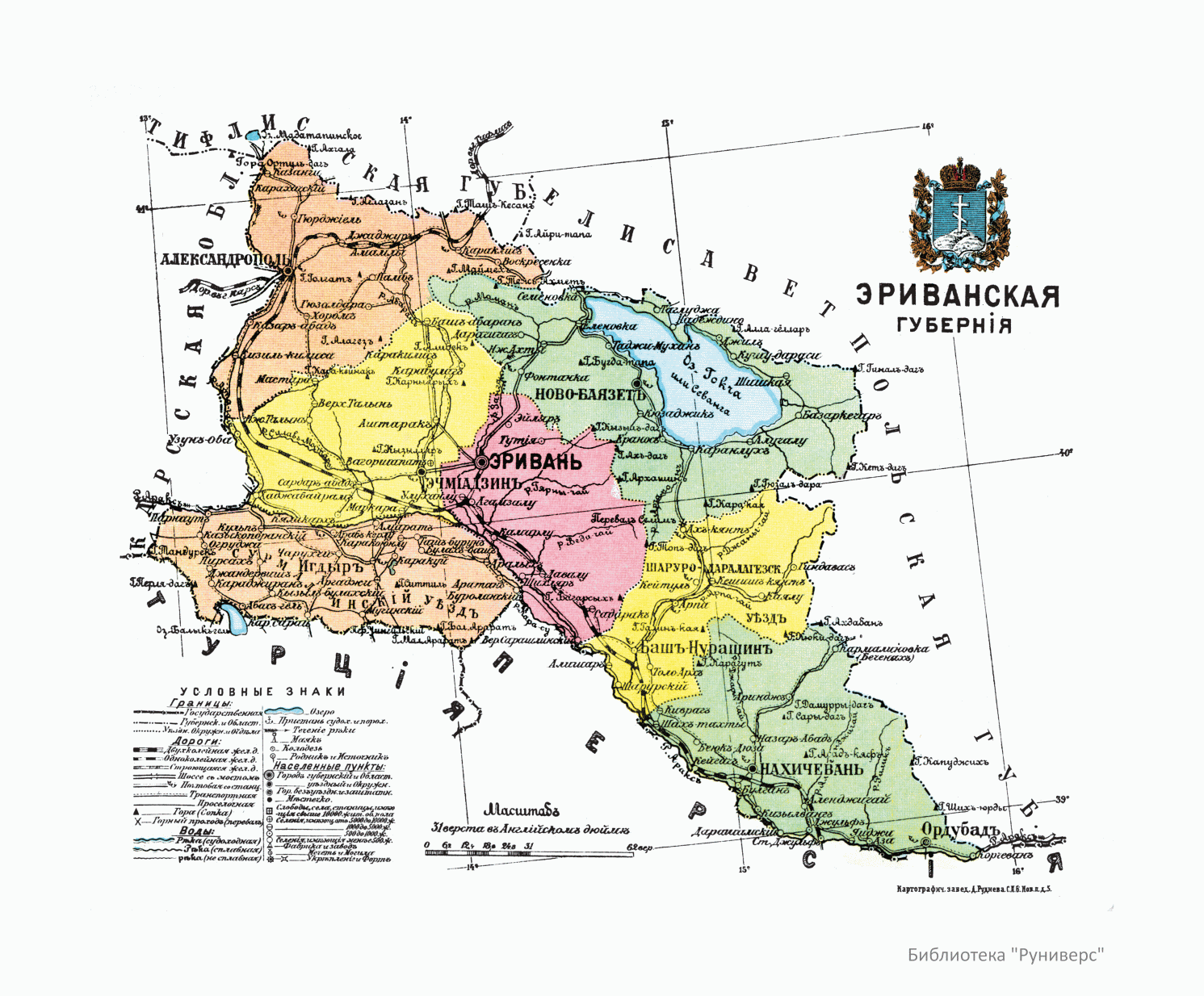
Erivan Governorate. Russian map.

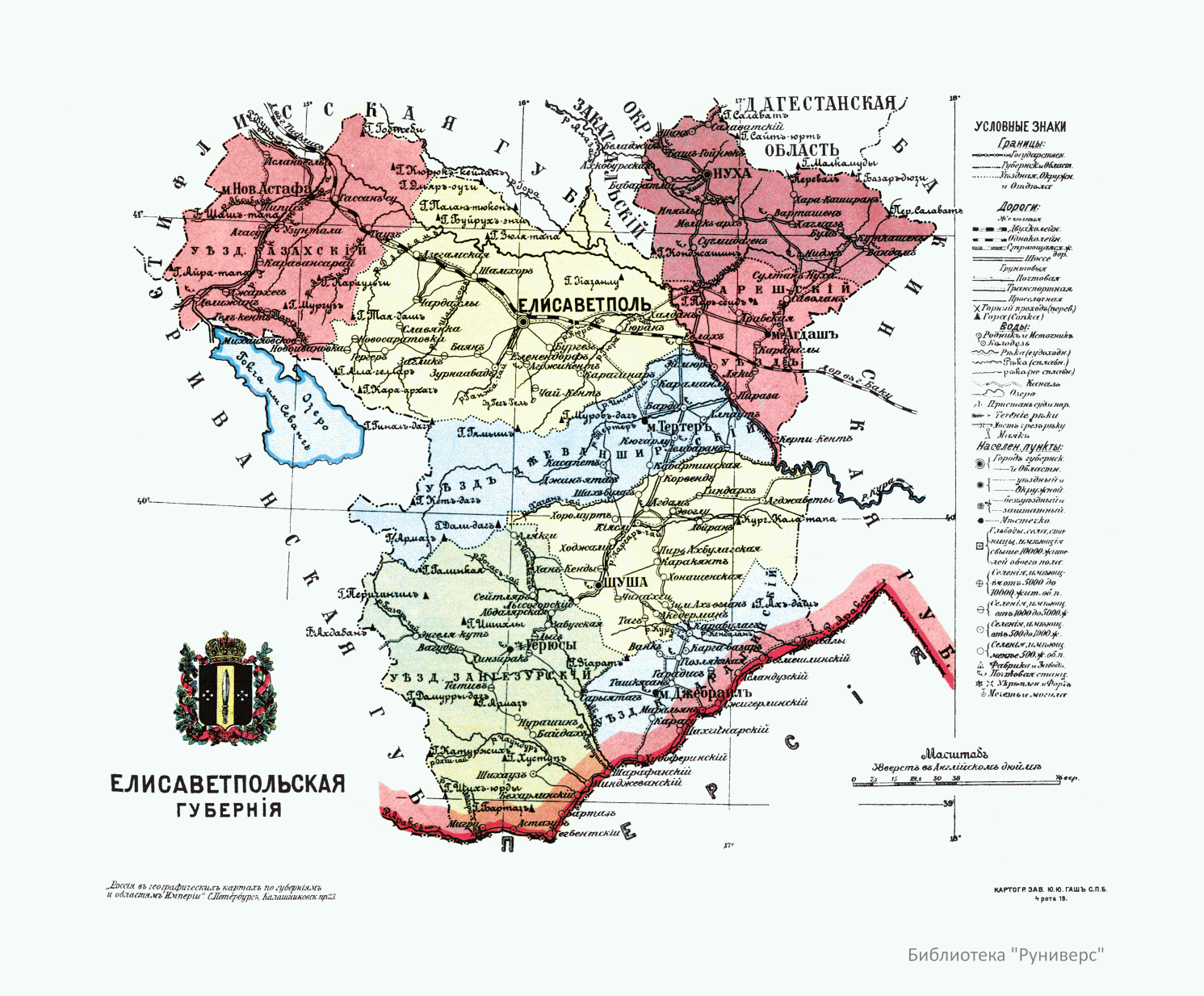
Elisabethpol Governorate. Russian map.

== See also ==
- History of Armenia
- Timeline of Armenian history
- Armenian Oblast
- Erivan Governorate
- Elizavetpol Governorate
- Kars Oblast (since 1878)

== Bibliography ==
- Bournoutian, George A. (1980). "The Population of Persian Armenia Prior to and Immediately Following its Annexation to the Russian Empire: 1826-1832" (PDF). The Wilson Center, Kennan Institute for Advanced Russian Studies.
- Kettenhofen, Erich; Bournoutian, George A.; Hewsen, Robert H. (1998). "EREVAN". Encyclopædia Iranica, Vol. VIII, Fasc. 5. pp. 542–551.
- Hovannisian, Richard G. (2004). The Armenian People From Ancient to Modern Times: Vol. II: Foreign Dominion to Statehood: The Fifteenth Century to the Twentieth Century. Palgrave Macmillan. p. 512 pages. ISBN 1-4039-6422-X.
- Suny, Ronald Grigor (1993). Looking Toward Ararat: Armenia in Modern History. Indiana University Press. p. 304 pages. ISBN 0-253-20773-8.
- Ternon, Yves (1996). Les Arméniens. Seuil. p. 436 pages. ISBN 2-02-025685-1.
- Kurdoghlian, Mihran (1996). Hayots Badmoutioun, B. Hador [Armenian History, volume II] (in Armenian). Athens, Greece: Hradaragutiun Azkayin Oosoomnagan Khorhoortee. pp. 89–93.
- Fisher, William Bayne; Avery, P.; Hambly, G. R. G; Melville, C. (1991). The Cambridge History of Iran. Vol. 7. Cambridge: Cambridge University Press. ISBN 0521200954.
- Mikaberidze, Alexander (2015). Historical Dictionary of Georgia (2 ed.). Rowman & Littlefield. ISBN 978-1442241466.
