= Avetis =

- Gender: Male
- Language: Armenian

Origin
- Region of origin: Armenia

Other names
- Alternative spelling: Avedis

Avetis and its variant Avedis (Armenian: Ավետիս Avetis, from ավետիս avetis, “good news”, alternative form: ավետիք avetikʿ, cf. Avetik) is a proper male name in Armenian. This given name is pronounced as [ɑvɛˈtis] in Eastern Armenian, and as [ɑvɛˈdis] in Western Armenian. Avetisyan, Avetissyan, Avetisian, Avetissian are Armenian patronymic surnames that derive from Avetis (Avedisyan, Avedissyan, Avedisian, Avedissian derive from the variant pronunciation Avedis). Avetis (or Avedis) means evangel or gospel in Armenian, referring to the gospel (or good news) of Jesus Christ.

== Avetis ==
- Avetis Aharonyan, an Armenian politician, writer, public figure and revolutionary
- Avetis Isahakyan, better known as Avetik Isahakyan
- Avetis Nazarbekian (1866–1939), also known as Nazarbek or Lerents, an Armenian poet, journalist, political activist and revolutionary. One of the founders of Social Democrat Hunchakian Party
- Avetis Sultan-Zade (1889–1938), Persian-Armenian communist revolutionary and economist, a founder of the Communist Party of Persia

== Avedis ==
- Avedis Boghos Derounian (1909–1991), American Armenian writer better known as Arthur Derounian and by the pen name John Roy Carlson
- Avedis Donabedian (1919–2000), Lebanese-Armenian physician
- Avedis Kendir (born 1959), Turkish Armenian jeweler
- Avedis Yapoudjian (1931–2017), Armenian journalist, historian and writer
- Avedis Zildjian Company, established by Avedis Zildjian
- Avie Tevanian, American Armenian software engineer and former senior vice president of software engineering at Apple

== See also ==
- Avetik (disambiguation)
- Avetisyan
