= Wilsonian Armenia =

1920 proposed boundaries of Armenia

Orthographic projection of the Wilsonian Armenia

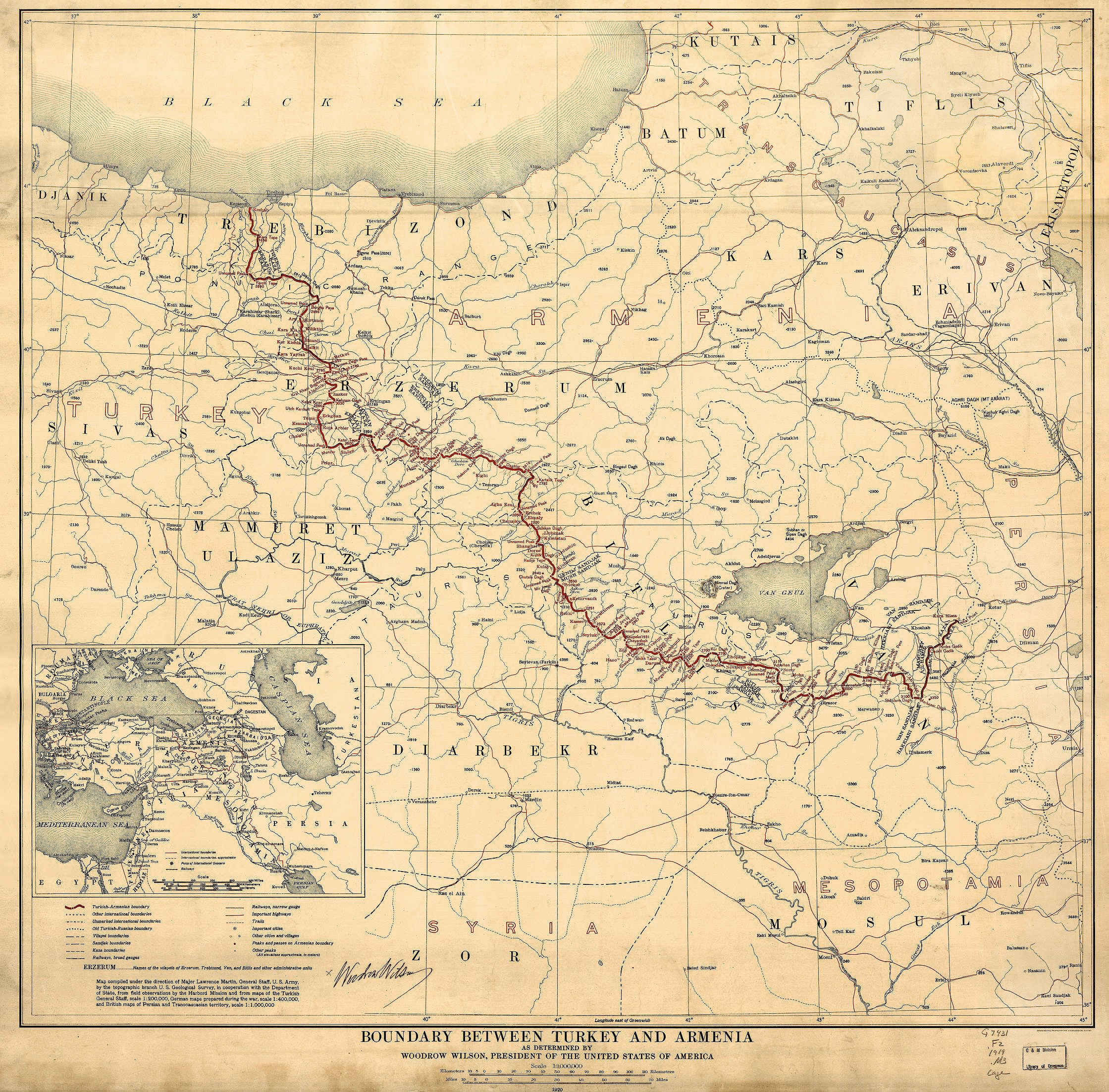
Wilsonian Armenia according to the Treaty of Sèvres.

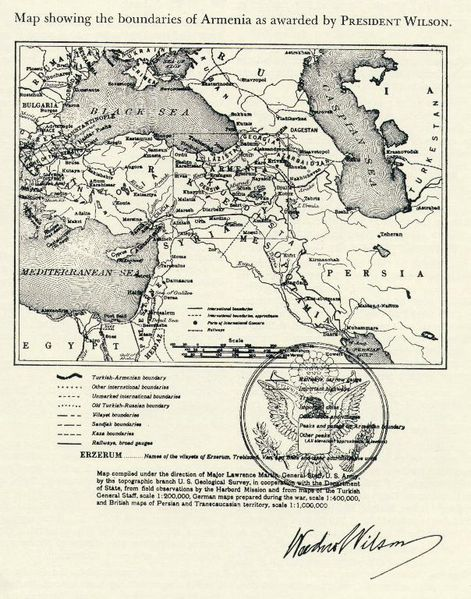
Map showing the boundaries of Armenia as awarded by President Wilson

Wilsonian Armenia (Armenian: Վիլսոնյան Հայաստան, romanized: Vilsonyan Hayastan) was the unimplemented boundary configuration of the First Republic of Armenia in the Treaty of Sèvres, as drawn by U.S. President Woodrow Wilson's Department of State. The Treaty of Sèvres was a peace treaty that had been drafted and signed between the Western Allied Powers and the defeated government of the Ottoman Empire in August 1920, but it was never ratified and was subsequently superseded by the Treaty of Lausanne. The proposed boundaries of Wilsonian Armenia incorporated Armenian-populated sections of Western Armenia — specifically the Ottoman vilayets of Erzurum, Bitlis, Van, and Trabzon. The inclusion of portions of Trabzon Vilayet was intended to provide the First Republic of Armenia with access to the Black Sea via the port of Trabzon. A proposed Republic of Pontus was discussed at the Paris Peace Conference of 1919, but the Greek government of Eleftherios Venizelos feared the precarious position of such a state, so a portion of it was instead included in the proposed state of Wilsonian Armenia.

The United States Senate rejected the mandate for Armenia in 1920. The outbreak of the Turkish War of Independence led to the Ottoman Empire not ratifying the Treaty of Sèvres. A few months later, Turkey invaded Armenia. Under the Treaty of Alexandropol on November 2, 1920, Armenia forfeited all claims to Western Armenia which had been promised under the Treaty of Sevres. Among other territory forfeited included Kars which was transferred to Turkey and Nakhchivan which was transferred to Azerbaijan. These border changes were ratified by the Treaty of Kars and the Treaty of Moscow (1921) which were negotiated between Soviet Russia and Turkey following the Sovietization of the First Republic of Armenia.

Today Armenians — both in the diaspora and indigenous to modern Turkey — have pursued political representation within Western Armenia or reunification with the Republic of Armenia, with a congress of genocide survivors' descendants active in the diaspora. In 2020, the three traditional Armenian political parties—the Armenian Revolutionary Federation (Dashnaks), Social Democrat Hunchakian Party (Hunchaks) and the Armenian Democratic Liberal Party (Ramgavars)—issued a joint statement on the centenary of the Sèvres Treaty, stating that it is the only internationally legal document that demarcates the border between Armenia and Turkey.

== Negotiations ==
During the Conference of London, David Lloyd George encouraged Woodrow Wilson to accept a mandate for Anatolia, and particularly, with the support of the Armenian diaspora, for the provinces claimed by the occupied Turkish Armenia. Wilson sent the King-Crane Commission and General James Harbord to the region to study the claims made by the Armenian national movement, and to determine if these claims were compatible with Wilson's Fourteen Points. The 12th point was:

The Turkish portion of the present Ottoman Empire should be assured a secure sovereignty, but the other nationalities which are now under Turkish rule should be assured an undoubted security of life and an absolutely unmolested opportunity of autonomous development, and the Dardanelles should be permanently opened as a free passage to the ships and commerce of all nations under international guarantees.

The King-Crane Commission noted that the Armenians had suffered a traumatic experience, that they could not trust the Ottoman Empire to respect their rights anymore, and that the Armenians were "a people." The Commission therefore recommended that the hard-won Armenian independence established during the Caucasus Campaign should be respected by the international community and insured by the Allies.

== Armenian arguments ==
The Armenian Revolutionary Federation (ARF), using their position of leaders of the Armenian national movement, claimed that this region should not be part of the Ottoman Empire based on their assertion that Armenians had the capability to build a nation. Armenians had de facto control over a region surrounding the Van Province of the Ottoman Empire for nearly 3 years (1915–1918). The ARF stated that it was natural to annex this region to the newly established First Republic of Armenia (1918–1920), the first modern Armenian republic created after the collapse of the Russian Empire.

Another argument developed during this period was that the population was becoming increasingly more Armenian, and therefore Armenians were not a minority but a plurality; moving the displaced Armenians to this area should be considered as an option. In 1917, some 150,000 Armenians relocated to the provinces of Erzurum, Bitlis, Muş, and Van. The Armenians had already begun building their houses and creating their farmlands. In 1917, the provincial governor Aram Manukian stated that a new autonomous state in the region should be founded, under Russia or the Ottoman Empire. Armen Garo (Karekin Pastermajian) and other spokesmen proposed to have Armenian soldiers in Europe transfer to the Caucasus front for the protection and stability of the new establishment. Armenian soldiers began to create a protective line between the Ottoman Army and Armenian front.

== Demographics ==
Armenian historian Ara Papian writes that in the 103,599 square kilometres (40,000 square miles) of territory awarded to Armenia by the Treaty of Sèvres, the pre-war population was 3,570,000, whereby Muslims formed 49 percent of the population, Armenians – 40 percent, Laz – 5 percent, Greeks – 4 percent, and others – 1 percent. Moreover, he projects that if the region had been joined to Armenia, the overall population would rise to 3 million and there would be a steady flow of Armenian repatriates to shift the demographics into the Armenians' favour. After a year of being joined to Armenia, it was predicted that the overall population would rise to 3 million (large amounts of Armenians were expected to return whereas "far few" Muslims wouldn't return to the four vilayets awarded to Armenia), whereby Armenians would form 50 percent of the population, Muslims – 40 percent, Lazes – 6 percent, Greeks – 4 percent, and others – 1 percent.

Avetis Aharonian, the head of the Armenian delegation to the Paris Peace Conference, made the conservative estimate that 815,000 Armenians abroad would repatriate to the territories awarded to Armenia: All 295,000 refugees from the Ottoman Empire within the Caucasus, 100,000 survivors in Anatolia (mainly concentrated in Sivas, Kharput, and Diyarbekir), 120,000 (out of 300,000) from Azerbaijan and Georgia each, 50,000 (out of 180,000) from Bessarabia, Crimea, the Don, and the rest of Russia, 10,000 (out of 95,000) from the North Caucasus and Batumi, 30,000 from the Balkans, 10,000 (out of 30,000) from Egypt, the Sudan, and Ethiopia, 30,000 (out of 130,000) from Iran, and 50,000 (out of 130,000) from the United States.

== Aftermath ==
In the aftermath of the King-Crane Commissions, events on the ground took their own course. President Wilson asked the United States Congress for the authority to establish a mandate for Armenia on May 24, 1920. The United States Senate rejected his request by a vote of 52 to 23 on June 1, 1920. In September 1920, the Turkish–Armenian War broke out. The First Republic of Armenia was defeated in November 1920 and signed the Treaty of Alexandropol under which it renounced the Treaty of Sèvres along with various territorial claims to "Western Armenia". The government of Armenia was subsequently overthrown. The new Armenian government signed the Treaty of Kars, which reaffirmed the previous Armenian concessions to Turkey and determined the modern-day borders between the two countries.

In late 1922, the various international parties negotiated the Treaty of Lausanne as a replacement for the Treaty of Sèvres. Given previous Turkish-Armenian treaties and the views of the then-current Soviet Armenian government, the issue of Armenian claims to "Western Armenia" was dropped.

After World War II, the Soviet Union attempted to annul the Treaty of Kars and regain the lands ceded to Turkey. The Soviet claims were backed by much of the international Armenian diaspora, as well as the Armenian Revolutionary Federation. Armenian leaders attempted to gather British and American support for the reclamation of eastern Anatolia from Turkey, but Winston Churchill objected to the Soviet and Armenian territorial claims. Likewise, the United States State Department backed Turkey as well, saying, as it had since 1934, that its previous support for Wilsonian Armenia had since expired. The Soviet Union dropped its claims against Turkey after Stalin's death in 1953.

== Modern times ==
Today, as a continuation of the initial goal, the creation of an independent and united Armenia consisting of all territories designated as Wilsonian Armenia by the Treaty of Sèvres is a stated aim of the Armenian Revolutionary Federation, regardless of the United States's official ending of support for the idea in 1934. The Armenian Revolutionary Federation, as well as the Social Democrat Hunchakian Party and the Armenian Democratic Liberal Party in a joint statement on the occasion of the 100th anniversary of the Treaty of Sèvres, stated that it still needs to be implemented, and that it is the only treaty signed by Turkey and the Republic of Armenia, by the free will of the Armenian side. On 10 July 2020 the President of Armenia Armen Sarkissian stated that "The Treaty of Sèvres even today remains an essential document for the right of the Armenian people to achieve a fair resolution of the Armenian issue" and that it is "a legal, interstate agreement which is de facto still in force".

Armenian Genocide historian Vahakn Dadrian argued that, though it began as an effort to improve the lot of Armenians, the Treaty of Sèvres served mainly to compound the misfortunes of Armenians. He wrote that:"However long overdue and deserved its terms might have seemed to the Armenians, its promise of restoring to the Armenians a large chunk of historic Armenia fueled extravagant Armenian hopes and irredentist aspirations." Genesis of the Sèvres Treaty also coincided with the definitive defeat of the Damat Ferit's Cabinet in Istanbul which had initiated the prosecution against the authors of the genocide. From that period on court martial proceedings slackened and gradually disappeared.

== See also ==
- Armenia–Turkey border
- Armenian genocide reparations
- Armenian highlands
- Armenian question
- Armenians in the Ottoman Empire
- Geography of Armenia
- Hidden Armenians
- History of Armenia
- Kurdistan
- Occupation of Western Armenia
- Partition of the Ottoman Empire
- Sazonov–Paléologue Agreement
- Sèvres syndrome
- Six Vilayets
- Sykes–Picot Agreement
- Turkish–Armenian War
- United Armenia
- Western Armenia
