= Avetisyan =

Avetisyan (Armenian: Ավետիսյան) is an Armenian surname. Notable people with the surname include:

- Abov Avetisyan (born 2001), Ukrainian footballer
- Arsen Avetisyan (born 1973), Armenian football player
- Artur Avetisyan (born 1998), Armenian gymnast and member of the national team
- Avet Avetisyan (1897–1971), Soviet Armenian film actor
- Erdzhanik Avetisyan (born 1969), Armenian and Russian sport shooter
- Goar Avetisyan (born 1993), Armenian make‑up artist and internet personality
- Hayk Avetisyan (born 1987), Armenian blogger
- Hunan Avetisyan (1913–1943), Soviet senior sergeant and Hero of the Soviet Union
- Jivan Avetisyan (born 1981), Armenian film director
- Karlen Avetisyan (1940–2004), Armenian painter and restorer
- Khachatur Avetisyan (1926–1996), Armenian‑Soviet composer
- Liparit Avetisyan (born 1990), Armenian operatic tenor
- Mardjan Avetisyan (born 1982), Armenian actress
- Mikael Avetisyan, Armenian conductor
- Minas Avetisyan (1928–1975), Armenian painter
- Mkrtich Avetisian, Armenian journalist and political figure
- Petros Avetisyan (born 1996), Armenian footballer
- Vandika Ervandovna Avetisyan (born 1928), Armenian botanist and mycologist
- Varduhi Avetisyan (born 1986), Armenian swimmer

== See also ==
- Avedisian
- Avetis (disambiguation)
