= Karlen Avetisyan =

Armenian painter

- Born: November 28, 1940; Arevshat
- Died: May 7, 2004 (aged 63); Yerevan
- Known for: fine art tapestry

Karlen Avetisyan (Armenian: Կառլեն Ավետիսյան, November 28, 1940 – May 7, 2004) was an Armenian painter and restorer.

== Biography ==
Karlen Avetisyan was born in the village of Arevshat, Soviet Armenia. In 1961 he graduated from the Fine Arts College named after P. Terlemezyan, and in 1969 - the Armenian Academy of Fine Arts and Theatre. During 1970–1988 he worked as a painter-restorer at the Monuments Protection Department. Since 1977 Avetisyan has been teaching in the Fine Arts College after P. Terlemezian, during 1996-2004 he served as a professor of composition at the Fine Arts Academy of Armenia.

Karlen Avetisyan died on May 7, 2004.

== Works ==
Karlen Avetisyan is the author of mural paintings (Grand Hotel Yerevan, 1999) and tapestry which are kept in House-Museum of Khachatur Abovyan (1973), curtain-tapestry in Sports and Music Hall after K. Demirchyan (1984). In 1990 he finished the tapestry based on a sketch of Grigor Khanjyan, which is now kept in the depositary of Etchmiadzin Cathedral.

Avetisyan worked on the projection of historical monuments and has published books (Earthy Creations", Ararat the Mather of Dimensional Figures Light").

Avetisyan is famous for his graphic works:

- “Flower day”, 1989
- “Family”, 1989
- “Composition”, 1996
- “Early Morning”, 1989
- “Adams Fall”, 1999
- “Blossom”, 2000

Avetisyan's works were exhibited in Yerevan in 2003, in Syria, Europe and the United States.

== Sources ==
- Who is who? Armenians. Biographical Encyclopedia, Volumes First, Yerevan, 2005
