= Avetik =

- Gender: Male
- Language: Armenian

Origin
- Region of origin: Armenia

Other names
- Alternative spelling: Avedik

Avetik (in Western Armenian Avedik) means "good news" in Armenian

Avetik / Avedik may refer to:

- Avedik, official publication of the Armenian Catholic Church

It is a given name for:

- Avetik Grigoryan, Armenian chess grandmaster
- Avetik Isahakyan, Armenian lyric poet, writer, academian and public activist
- Avetik Sahakyan, also known as Father Abraham, Armenian politician, the Parliamentary President (speaker) of the First Republic of Armenia in 1918-19 and government minister
- Arthur Abraham, (born Avetik Abrahamyan), an Armenian-German professional boxer

== See also ==
- Avetis (disambiguation)
