= Avedisian =

Avedisian (Armenian: Ավետիսյան) is an Armenian surname. Notable people with the surname include:

- Chuck Avedisian (1917–1983), professional football player
- Edward Avedisian (1936–2007), American painter
- Jade Avedisian (born 2006), American racing driver
- Margaux Avedisian, American entrepreneur and comedian
- Scott Avedisian (born 1965), American politician

== See also ==
- Avetisyan
