= Hakob Zavriev =

Armenian politician

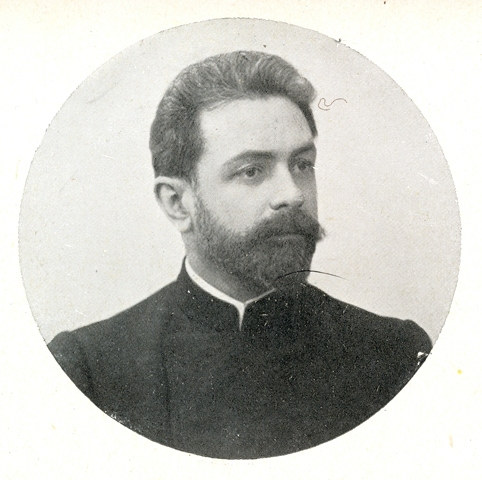

Civil Affairs of Van
- In office May 1917 – December 1917
- Preceded by: position established
- Succeeded by: position abolished

Personal details
- Party: Armenian Revolutionary Federation
- Education: St. Petersburg Army Medical Academy

Hakob Zavriev (Armenian: Հակոբ Զավրիև), also known as Yakov Zavriev (Russian: Яков Христофорович Завриев) (1866, Tiflis - 20 February 1920, Moscow), was an Armenian politician.

Zavriev was a graduate of the St. Petersburg Army Medical Academy. He later joined the Armenian Revolutionary Federation. The viceroy of the Caucasus consulted him over the formation of the Armenian volunteer units in 1914. He was an Armenian Revolutionary Federation representative in the Constituent Assembly formed by Armenian Congress of Eastern Armenians in November 1917. The Constituent Assembly prepared the organization and set the conditions of declaration of the First Republic of Armenia. Zavriev later was the representative of the First Republic in Moscow.
