= Avedis Kendir =

Armenian jeweler

- Born: 1959 (age 66–67); Istanbul, Turkey
- Occupation: Jeweller
- Years active: 1980–present
- Known for: Founder of Biriz Jewellery

Avedis Kendir (born 1959 in Istanbul, Turkey) is an Armenian jeweler.

== Life and career ==
Of Armenian descent, Avedis Kendir was born to a family of Armenian Sivas, Turkey. After discontinuing education at the age of 10, Kendir began learning to make jewelry as an apprentice under an Armenian jewelry master Mateos Usta. In 1980, Kendir founded the "Biriz Jewelry" company and opened his first store in 1983. He has been designing and making jewelry for since then. His style of jewelry is Art Nouveau, Art Deco, and Ottoman stylization. He sells much of his designs at the Kempinski Hotel in Çırağan Palace.
