= Arevshat, Shirak =

Arevshat Արևշատ
- Location within Armenia Location within Shirak
- Coordinates: 40°38′55″N 44°02′40″E
- Country: Armenia
- Province: Shirak
- Municipality: Artik
- Elevation: 1,900 m (6,200 ft)

Population (2011)
  - Total: 1,809
- Time zone: UTC+4
  - Summer (DST): UTC+5

Arevshat (Armenian: Արևշատ) is a village in the Artik Municipality of the Shirak Province of Armenia. The Statistical Committee of Armenia reported its population was 2,082 in 2010, up from 1,785 at the 2001 census.

== Demographics ==
Historical population
Year	Pop.	±% p.a.
1831	206	—
1878	661	+2.51%
1914	1,153	+1.56%
1922	1,371	+2.19%
1959	1,166	−0.44%
1970	1,296	+0.97%
1979	1,290	−0.05%
2001	1,785	+1.49%
2011	1,809	+0.13%
