= Sazonov–Paléologue Agreement =

1916 agreement between Russia and France

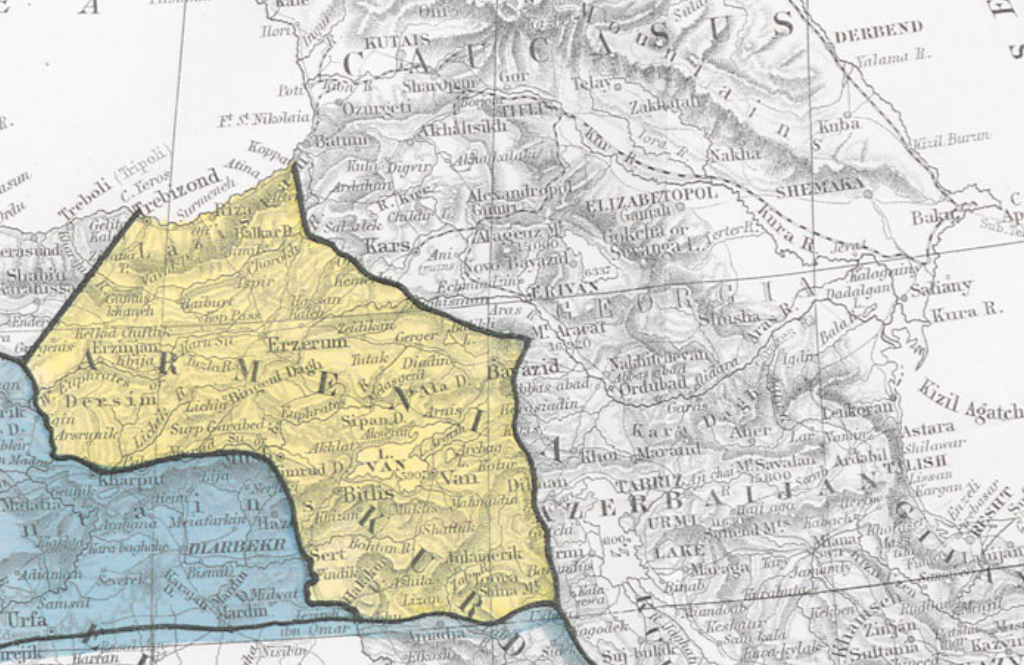
Extract from a January 1919 British Foreign Office memorandum summarizing the wartime agreements regarding the Ottoman Empire - the Sazonov–Paléologue Agreement area ceded to Russia is in yellow.

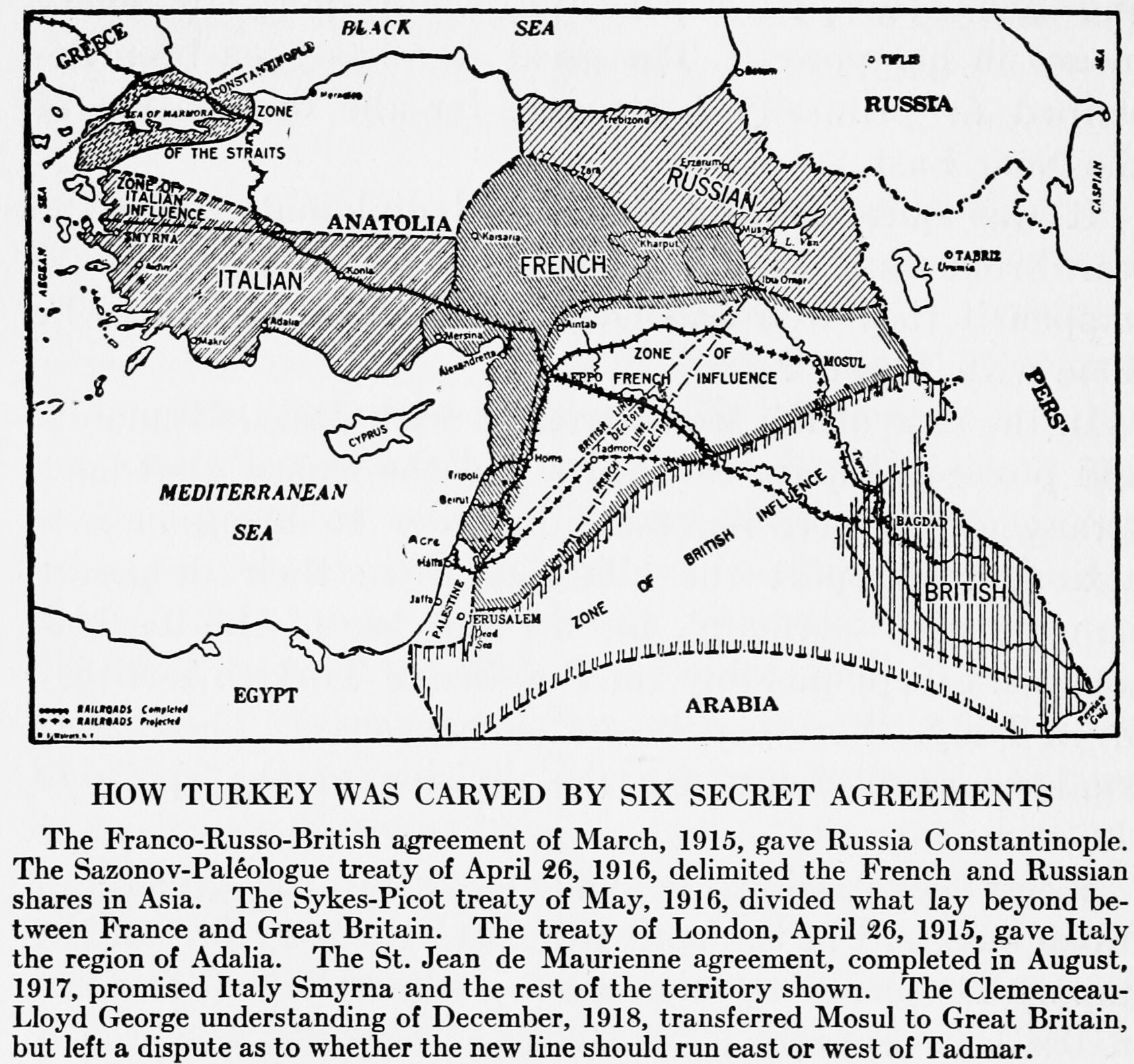
The treaties as summarized in 1923 by Ray Stannard Baker, who was Woodrow Wilson’s press secretary during the Paris Peace Conference.

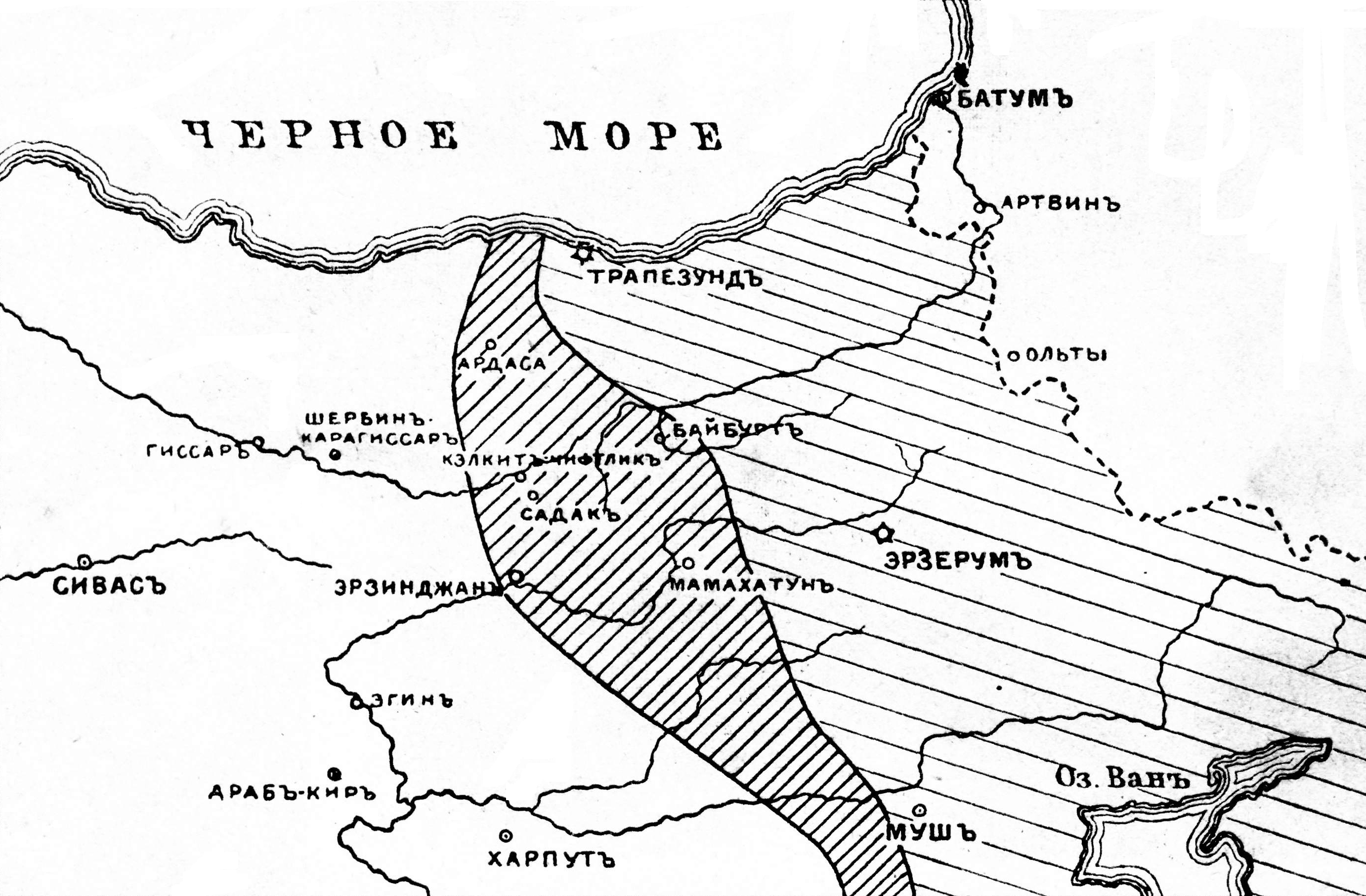
Western Armenia under Russian occupation in the summer of 1916

The Sazonov–Paléologue Agreement was a 26 April 1916 letter from Russian Foreign minister Sergey Sazonov to French ambassador to Russia Maurice Paléologue regarding Western Armenia and the Anglo-French Sykes–Picot Agreement. The agreement for Russian influence over Western Armenia was given in return for Russian assent to the Sykes-Picot arrangement. The agreement took place on the first anniversary of the Treaty of London.

Russia was allocated the vilayets of Erzurum, Trebizond, Bitlis and Van; much of which was under Russian occupation at the time.

== Bibliography ==
- The Allies and Armenia, 1915-18, Richard G. Hovannisian, Journal of Contemporary History, Vol. 3, No. 1 (Jan., 1968), pp. 145-168
