= Armenian National Congress (1917) =

The Armenian National Congress (or Congress of Eastern Armenians) was a political congress established to provide representation for the Armenians of Russia. It first met at the Artistic Theatre in Tbilisi on 11 October [O.S. 28 September] 1917. Its formation was prompted by the opportunities the Russian Revolution provided for Armenians (and other minority nationalities in Russia) towards the end of World War I.

== Members ==
The congress consisted of 204 members from all over the Russian Empire, with only Armenian Bolsheviks refusing to take part for ideological reasons. It was dominated by the Dashnak Party.

The composition along party lines was as follows:

- Dashnaks: 113 representatives
- Populists: 43 representatives
- Socialist Revolutionaries: 23 representatives
- Social Democrats: 9 representatives
- No party: 7 representatives
- There was also a small number of representatives from Western Armenia, including Andranik Ozanian.

== Functioning ==
Since a real government did not exist in the Yerevan province of Armenia, the Armenian National Congress served as a government for the province. According to Richard Hovannisian, the Congress was "the most comprehensive Eastern Armenian gathering since the Russian conquest of Transcaucasia". The immediate objectives of the Congress were to devise a strategy for the war effort, provide relief for refugees, and provide local autonomy for various Armenian-run institutions throughout the Caucasus. The Congress also called for the militarization of the Caucasus front. The Armenian National Congress supported the policies of the Russian Provisional Government concerning the war, and also suggested redrawing provincial boundaries along ethnic lines. The Congress was instrumental in the secularization of Armenian schools and the nationalization of secondary Armenian schools.

The Congress met for 18 sessions before it dissolved on 26 October [O.S. 13 October] 1917.

== Legacy ==
Before dissolving, the Congress created a National Assembly of 35 members to act as a legislative body for Armenians under the Russian Republic. It also created an executive body of 15 members called the Armenian National Council, headed by Avetis Aharonian. This council eventually declared independence for the First Republic of Armenia led by Aram Manukian in May 1918.

== Sources ==
- Richard G. Hovannisian Armenia on the Road to Independence (University of California, 1967)
- Richard G. Hovannisian The Republic of Armenia: The First Year 1918-19 (University of California, 1971)
- Rouben Paul Adalian Historical Dictionary of Armenia (Scarecrow Press, 2010)
- Anahide Ter-Minassian La République d'Arménie 1918-20 (Éditions Complexe, 2006 ed.)
