= Avetis Aharonian =

Armenian revolutionary and politician

- Աւետիս Ահարոնեան
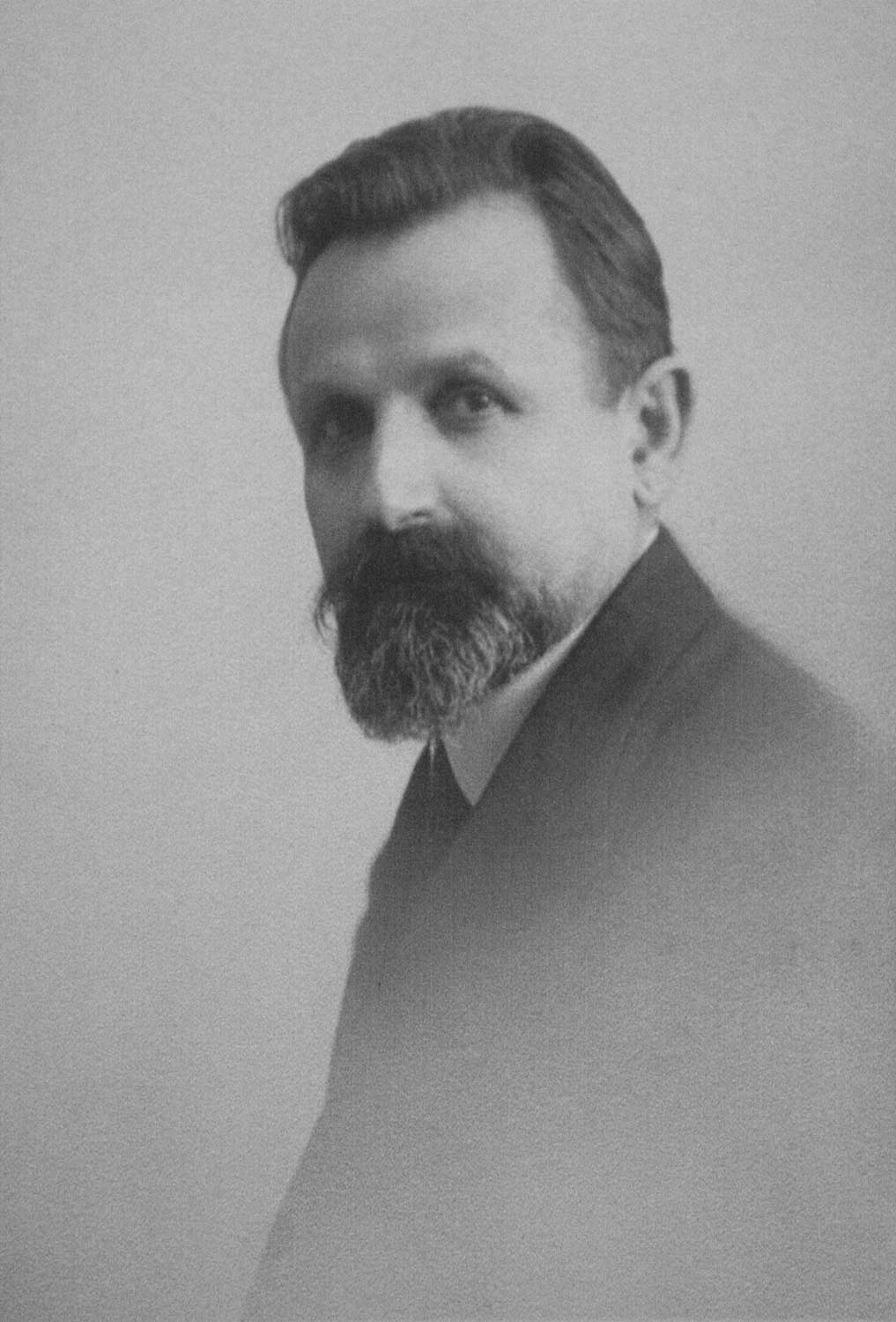

Chairman of the Parliament of Armenia
- In office 1 August 1919 – 4 November 1920
- Preceded by: Avetik Sahakyan
- Succeeded by: Hovhannes Katchaznouni

Chairman of the Armenian National Council
- In office October 1917 – 17 July 1918
- Preceded by: position established
- Succeeded by: position abolished

Personal details
- Born: January 4, 1866 Iğdır, Surmalinsky Uyezd, Erivan Governorate, Russian Empire
- Died: March 20, 1948 (aged 82) Paris, France
- Resting place: Père Lachaise Cemetery
- Party: Armenian Revolutionary Federation
- Occupation: politician, writer, public figure and revolutionary

Avetis Aharonian (Armenian: Աւետիս Ահարոնեան; 4 January 1866 – 20 March 1948) was an Armenian politician, writer, public figure and revolutionary, also part of the Armenian national movement.

== Biography ==
Aharonian was born in 1866 in Surmali, Erivan Governorate, Russian Empire (today Iğdır, Turkey). Growing up, he was influenced by the natural features of his birthplace, such as the Aras River and Mount Ararat, both of which were located near Surmali.

His mother, Zardar, was a literate person, who was able to educate her child by teaching him how to read and write. After completing elementary education at the village's school, he was sent to Echmiadzin's Gevorkian Seminary, and graduated from there. He became a teacher for a few years, after which he went to Switzerland's University of Lausanne to study history and philosophy. During this period of time, he met Kristapor Mikaelian, who was then the chief editor of the Troshag (Flag) newspaper and befriends Télémaque Tutundjian de Vartavan, who is in the Faculty of Law since 1900; they decide to join their efforts for the creation of an independent Armenia. He then began to write for the paper. In 1901, upon graduation, he went to study literature at the Sorbonne.

In 1902, he returned to the Caucasus and became the headmaster of the Nersisian School in Tiflis and the chief editor of the Mourj (Hammer) newspaper. Thus, in 1909, he was captured by the Tsar's government and imprisoned in Metekhi's prison, where he fell ill. Two years later, after a generous donation of 20,000 rubles, he fled to Europe.

He returned to the Caucasus in 1917, and chaired the Armenian National Council, which proclaimed the independence of the First Republic of Armenia on 28 May 1918. He signed the Treaty of Batum with the Ottoman Empire.

In 1919, he was the head the delegation of the Republic of Armenia at the Paris Peace Conference, in parallel with Boghos Nubar's Armenian National Delegation, where he signed the Treaty of Sèvres formulating the "Wilsonian Armenia" in direct collaboration with the Armenian diaspora.

After 1920, Aharonian lived in emigration, in Paris. In 1926, he was nominated to the Nobel Prize for Literature by Antoine Meillet. He suffered a stroke in 1934 and lived for the last fourteen years of his life totally incapacitated. Aharonian died in Marseille in 1948.

His son, Vardges Aharonian, was a writer and activist.

== Photos ==
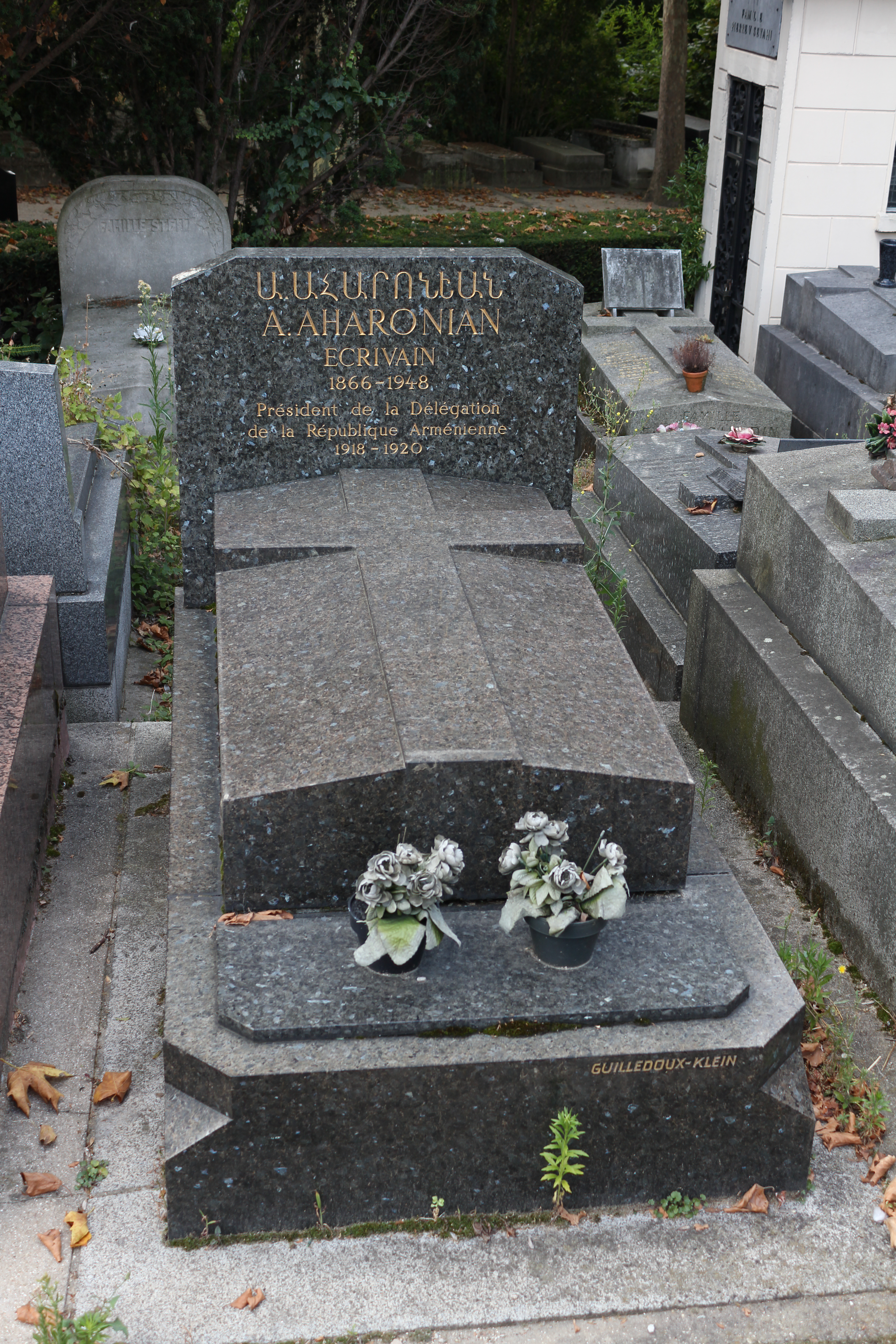
Grave of Avetis Aharonian

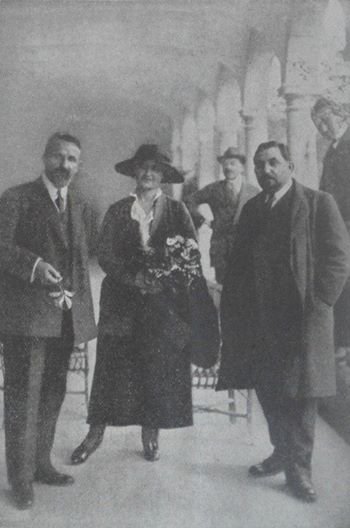
Avetis Aharonyan with his second wife Nvard at the Saint Lazarus Island in Venice in 1920

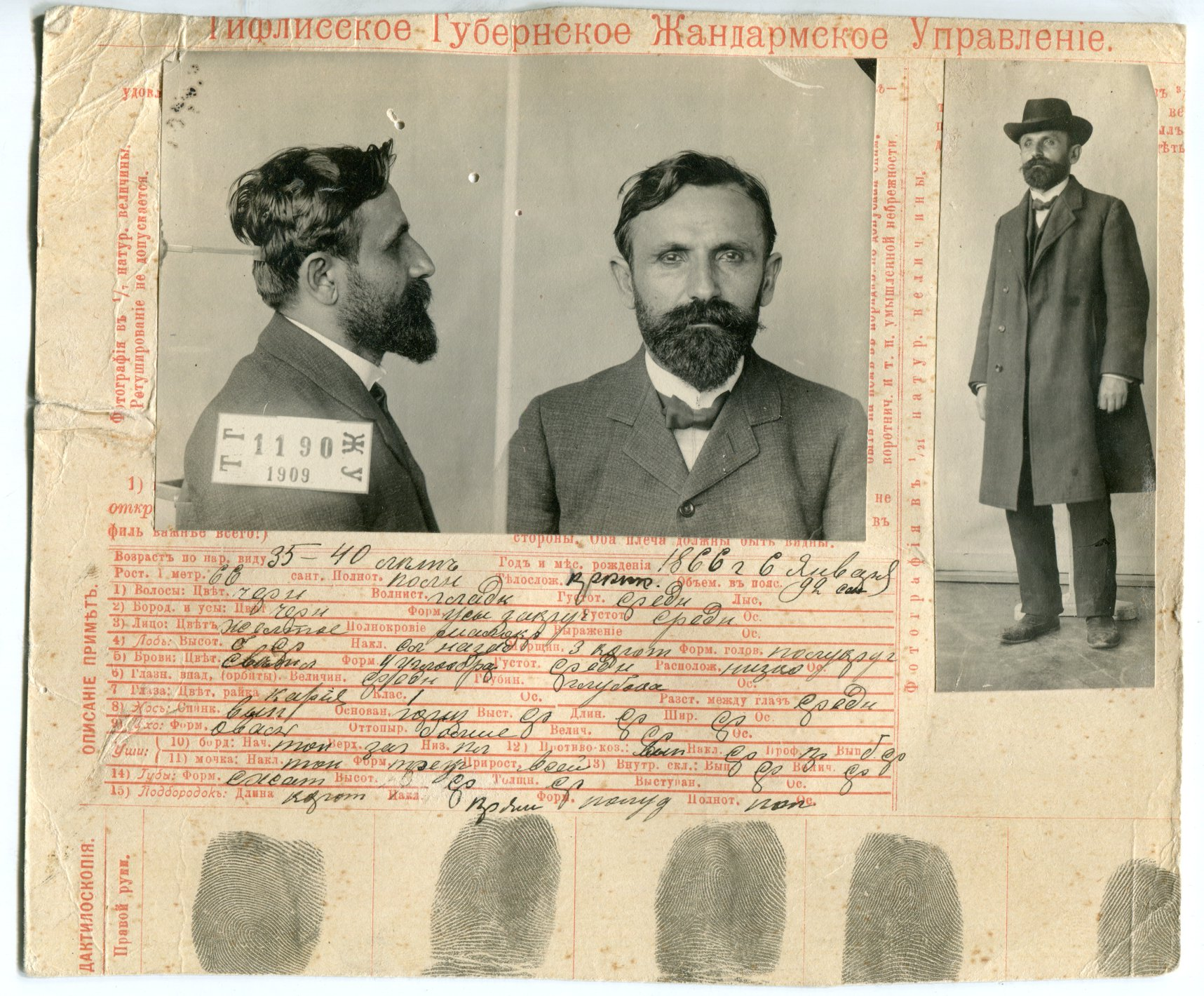
Mugshot of Avetis Aharonyan made in Tiflis in 1909
