= Cabinets of the First Republic of Armenia =

List of cabinets of the First Republic of Armenia (1918–1920)

The First Republic of Armenia was the first independent Armenian state since the Cilician Kingdom of Armenia, proclaimed on 28 May 1918 in the territory of present Armenia. The republic lasted until 2 December 1920 when it was partitioned by the Russian SFSR and the Turkish Nationalist forces. In the two and a half years of its existence, the republic was composed of 9 mostly Dashnak-dominated cabinets.

== First Cabinet ==
(30 June – 4 November 1918)

After weeks of negotiations, the Armenian National Council sent Hovhannes Kachaznuni to Yerevan to form the first Armenian cabinet on an "individual basis":

Portfolio	Holder	Party
Premier (Minister-President)	Hovhannes Kachaznuni	Dashnak
Foreign Affairs	Alexander Khatisian	Dashnak
Internal Affairs	Aram Manukian	Dashnak
Financial Affairs	Khachatur Karchikyan	Dashnak
Military Affairs	Hovhannes Hakhverdyan	Non-partisan

== Second Cabinet ==
(4 November 1918 – Spring 1919)

Populist Kristapor Vermishian replaced Levon Ghulian as Minister of Provisions on 1 March 1919. In March, 1919, Colonel Christophor Araratov was promoted to a major general, becoming the Minister of Military Affairs:

Portfolio	Holder	Party
Premier (Minister-President)	Hovhannes Kachaznuni	Dashnak
Foreign Affairs	Sirakan Tigranyan	Dashnak
Internal Affairs	Aram Manukian	Dashnak
Welfare (Public Assistance)	Khachatur Karchikyan	Dashnak
Military Affairs	Hovhannes Hakhverdian	Non-partisan
Financial Affairs	Artashes Enfiadjian	Populist
Judicial Affairs	Samson Harutiunian	Populist
Enlightenment (Public Instruction)	Mikayel Atabekian	Populist
Provisions	Levon Ghulyan	Populist

== Third Cabinet ==
(Spring 1919 – 28 May 1919)

The third cabinet was as follows:

Portfolio	Holder	Party
Premier (Minister-President)	Hovhannes Kachaznuni	Dashnak
Foreign Affairs	Sirakan Tigranyan	Dashnak
Internal Affairs	Alexander Khatisian	Dashnak
Welfare (Public Assistance)	Sahak Torosyan	Dashnak
Justice	Samson Harutiunian	Populist
Finance	Artashes Enfiadjian	Populist
Enlightenment	Gevorg Melik-Karageozian	Populist
Provisions	Kristapor Vermishian	Populist
Military Affairs	Christophor Araratov	Non-partisan

== Fourth Cabinet ==
(28 May – 10 August 1919)

Khatisian formed an interim cabinet before the coming election after the Populists boycotted the Dashnaks; Harutiun Chmshkian left the Populists to remain in the cabinet:

Portfolio	Holder	Party
Premier-President (Abroad)	Hovhannes Kachaznuni	Dashnak
Acting Premier	Alexander Khatisian	Dashnak
Foreign Affairs	Alexander Khatisian	Dashnak
Internal Affairs	Sargis Manasian	Dashnak
Welfare	Sahak Torosian	Dashnak
Public Instruction	Sirakan Tigranian	Dashnak
Justice	Harutiun Chmshkian	Non-partisan
Military Affairs	General Christophor Araratov	Non-partisan

== Fifth Cabinet ==
(10 August 1919 – Spring 1920)

The 1919 Armenian parliamentary election gave the Dashnaks a "sweeping majority in the legislature":

Portfolio	Holder	Party
Minister-President	Alexander Khatisian	Dashnak
Foreign Affairs	Alexander Khatisian	Dashnak
Internal Affairs	Abraham Gyulkhandanyan	Dashnak
Judicial Affairs	Abraham Gyulkhandanyan	Dashnak
Finance	Sargis Araratyan	Dashnak
Provisions	Sargis Araratyan	Dashnak
Welfare and Labor	Avetik Sahakyan	Dashnak
Agricultural Administration	Avetik Sahakyan	Dashnak
Public Enlightenment and Culture	Nikol Aghbalian	Dashnak
Military Affairs	Christophor Araratov	Non-partisan

== Sixth Cabinet ==
(February – 5 April 1920)

Most ministries were reorganised in preparation for a campaign of national reconstruction:

Portfolio	Holder	Party
Minister-President	Alexander Khatisian	Dashnak
Foreign Affairs	Alexander Khatisian	Dashnak
Internal Affairs	Abraham Gyulkhandanyan	Dashnak
Judicial Affairs	Artashes Chilingarian	Dashnak
Communications	Arshak Jamalyan	Dashnak
Finance	Sargis Araratyan	Dashnak
Welfare and Reconstruction	Artashes Babalian	Dashnak
Rural Economy and State Properties	Simon Vratsian	Dashnak
Labor	Simon Vratsian	Dashnak
State Controller	Grigor Djaghetian	Dashnak
Military Affairs	Major General Christophor Araratov	Non-partisan

== Seventh Cabinet ==
(5 April – 5 May 1920)

For the first time since the first cabinet, Dashnaks held all the posts:

Portfolio	Holder	Party
Minister-President	Alexander Khatisian	Dashnak
Foreign Affairs	Hamo Ohanjanyan	Dashnak
Internal Affairs	Abraham Gyulkhandanyan	Dashnak
Finance	Sargis Araratyan	Dashnak
Justice	Artashes Chilingarian	Dashnak
Communiations	Arshak Jamalyan	Dashnak
Welfare and Reconstruction	Artashes Babalian	Dashnak
Labour	Simon Vratsian	Dashnak
Agriculture and State Properties	Simon Vratsian	Dashnak
Public Education and Culture	Nikol Aghbalian	Dashnak
Military Affairs	Ruben Ter-Minasian	Dashnak

== Eighth Cabinet ==
(5 May – 25 November 1920)

Following the chaos of the May Uprising, Alexander Khatisian resigned from the cabinet, leading to a formation of a new government under Hamo Ohandjanian:

Portfolio	Holder	Party
Minister-President	Hamo Ohanjanyan	Dashnak
Foreign Affairs	Hamo Ohanjanyan	Dashnak
Internal Affairs	Ruben Ter-Minasian	Dashnak
Military Affairs	Ruben Ter-Minasian	Dashnak
Finance	Abraham Gyulkhandanyan	Dashnak
Justice	Abraham Gyulkhandanyan	Dashnak
Welfare and Reconstruction	Sargis Araratyan	Dashnak
Labor	Simon Vratsian	Dashnak
Agriculture and State Properties	Simon Vratsian	Dashnak
Communications	Arshak Jamalyan	Dashnak
Public Enlightenment and Culture	Gevorg Ghazarian	Dashnak

== Ninth Cabinet ==
(25 November – 2 December 1920)

As the Turkish-Armenian War progressed unfavourably for the Republic of Armenia, the government of Hamo Ohandjanian resigned, leading to Simon Vratsian forming the last cabinet of Armenia before its partition:

Portfolio	Holder	Party
Minister-President	Simon Vratsian	Dashnak
Foreign Affairs	Simon Vratsian	Dashnak
Interim Internal Affairs	Simon Vratsian	Dashnak
Military Affairs	Drastamat Kanayan	Dashnak
Finance	Hambardzum Terterian	Dashnak
Interim Welfare	Hambardzum Terterian	Dashnak
Agriculture and State Properties	Arshak Hovhannisyan	Dashnak
Judicial Affairs	Arsham Khondkarian	Social Revolutionary
Interim Commercial Affairs	Arsham Khondkarian	Social Revolutionary
Public Enlightenment and Culture	Vahan Minakhorian	Social Revolutionary

== Gallery ==
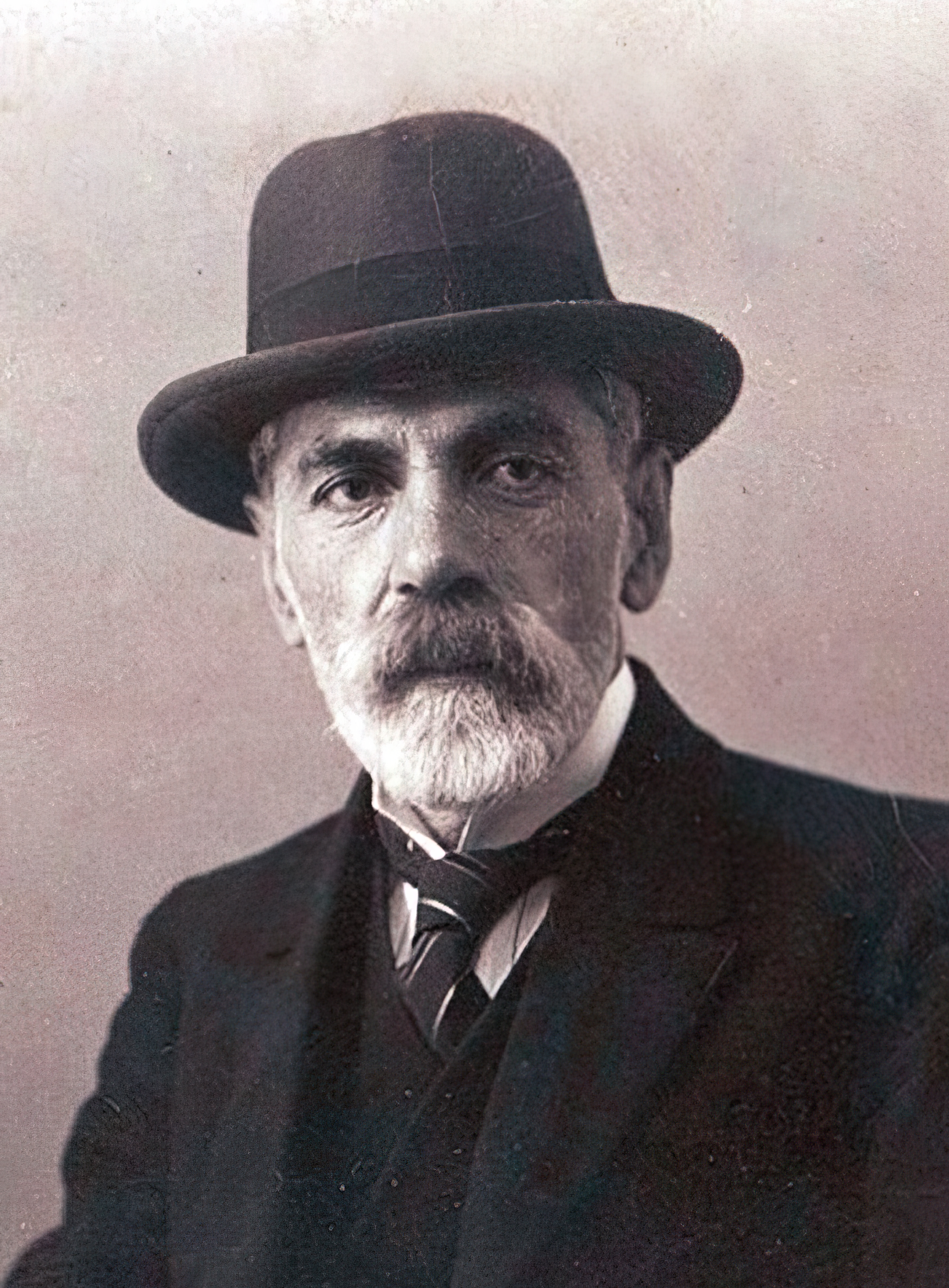
Hovhannes Kajaznuni

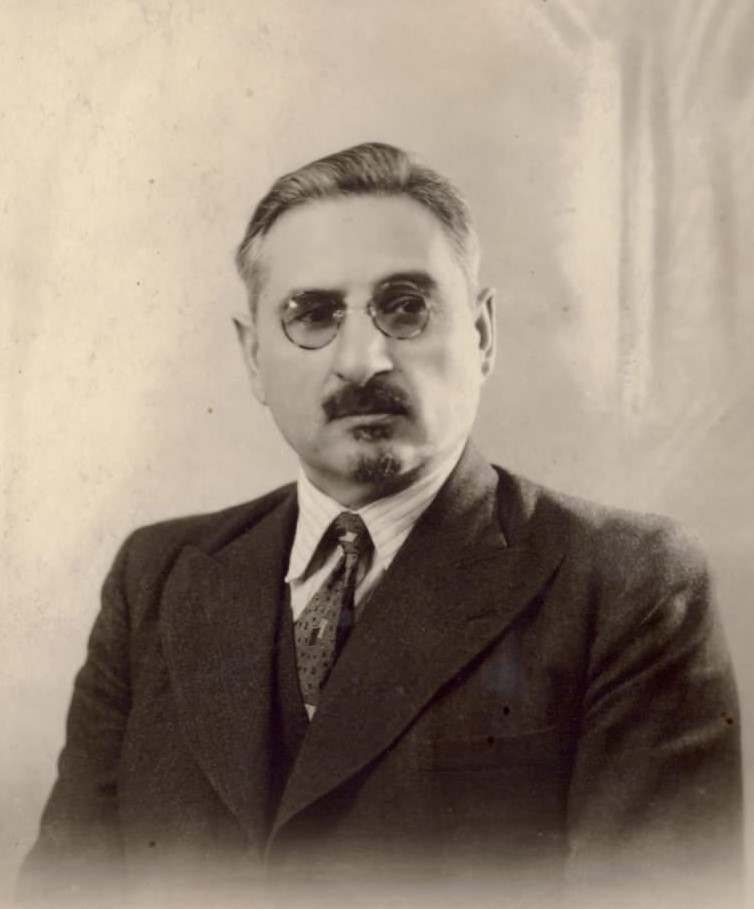
Simon Vratsian

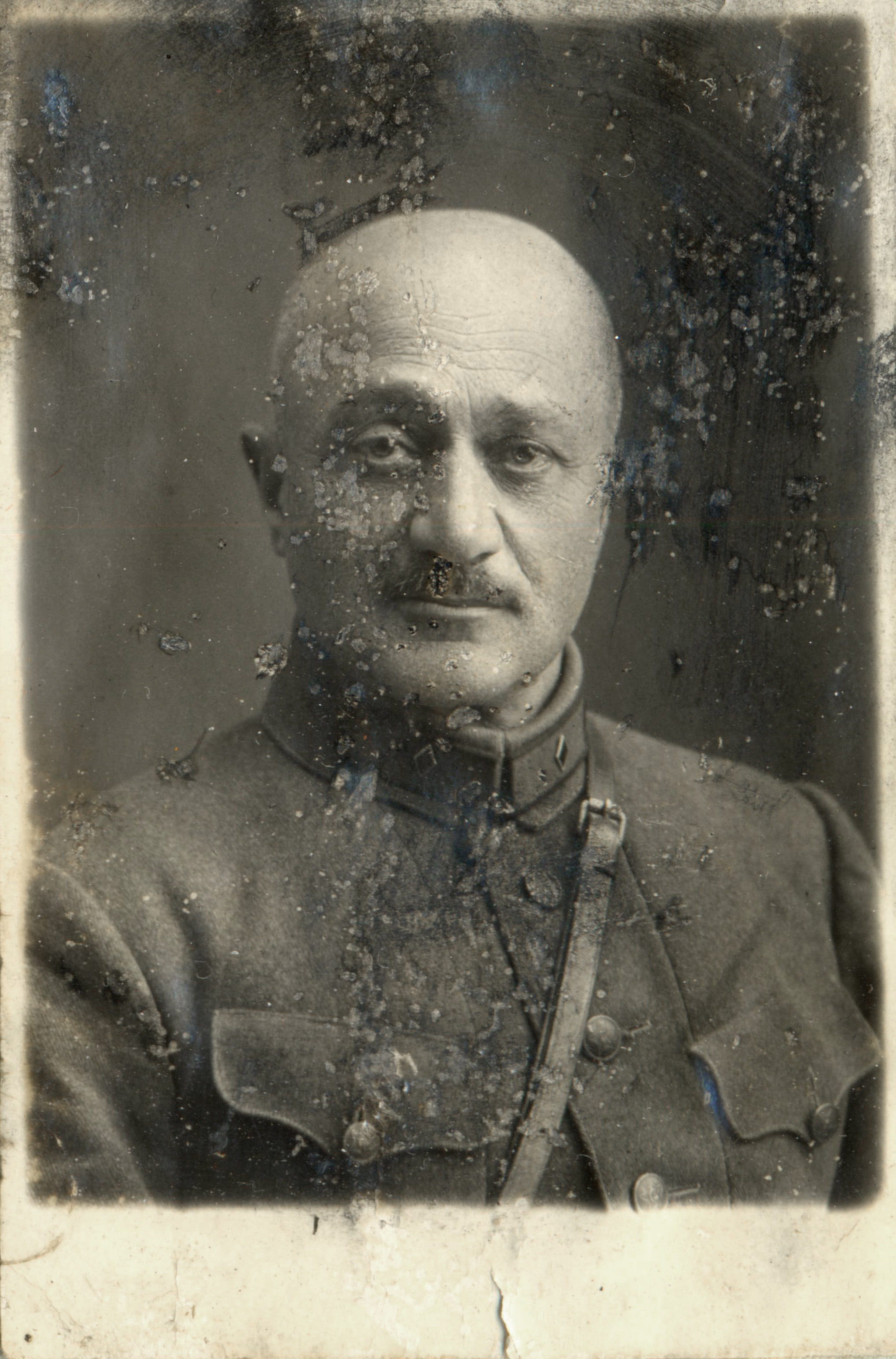
Christophor Araratov

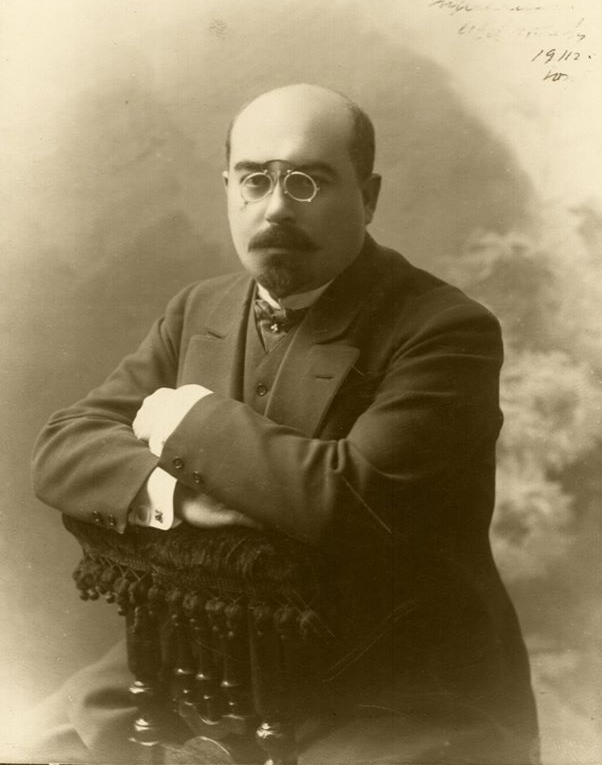
Alexander Khatisian

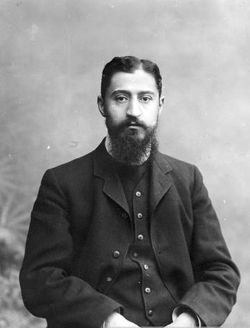
Sirakan Tigranyan

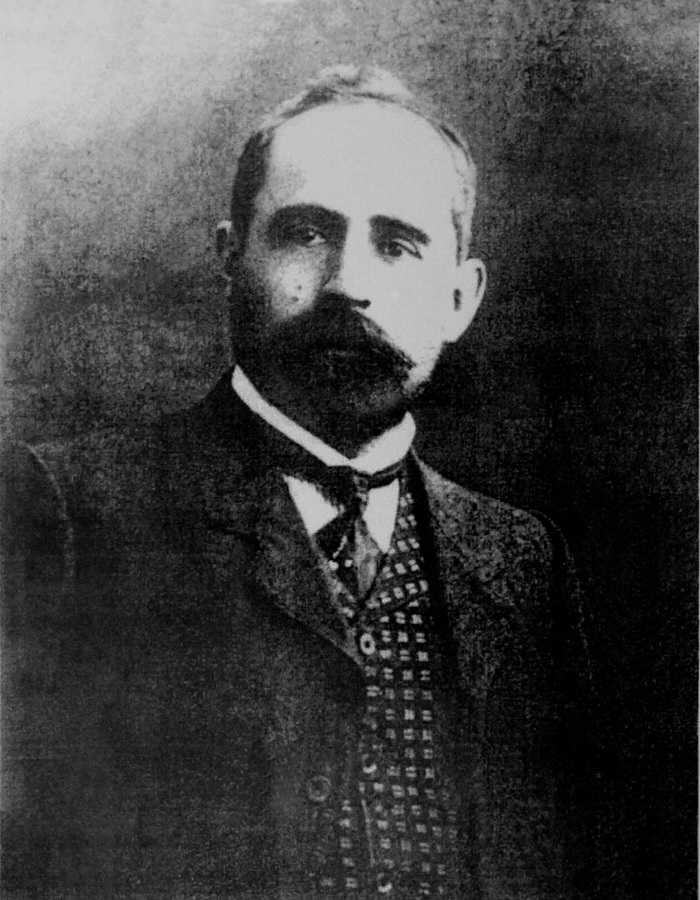
Sargis Manasyan

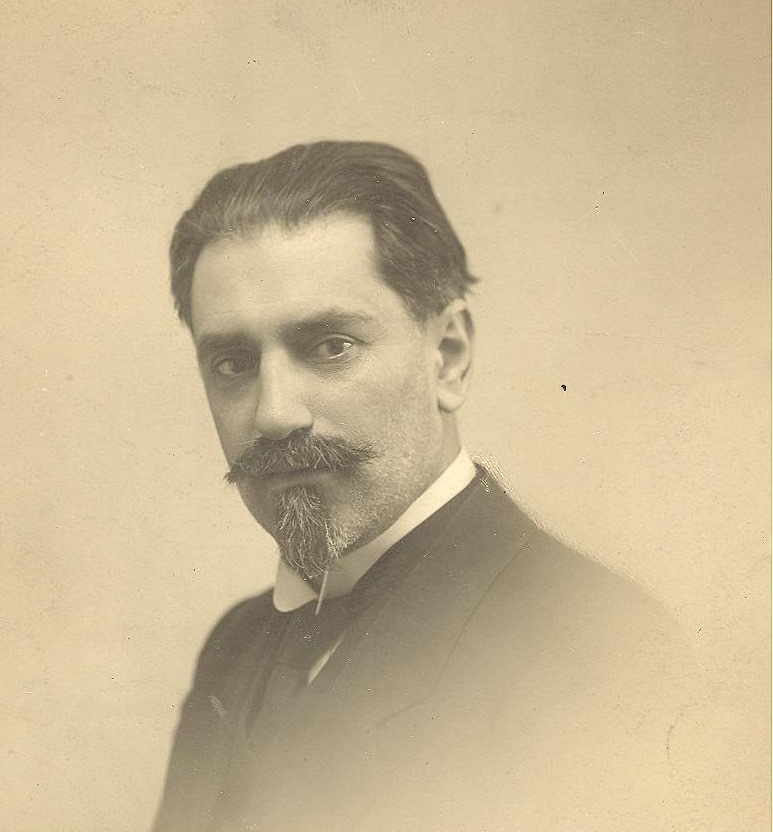
Hamo Ohanjanyan

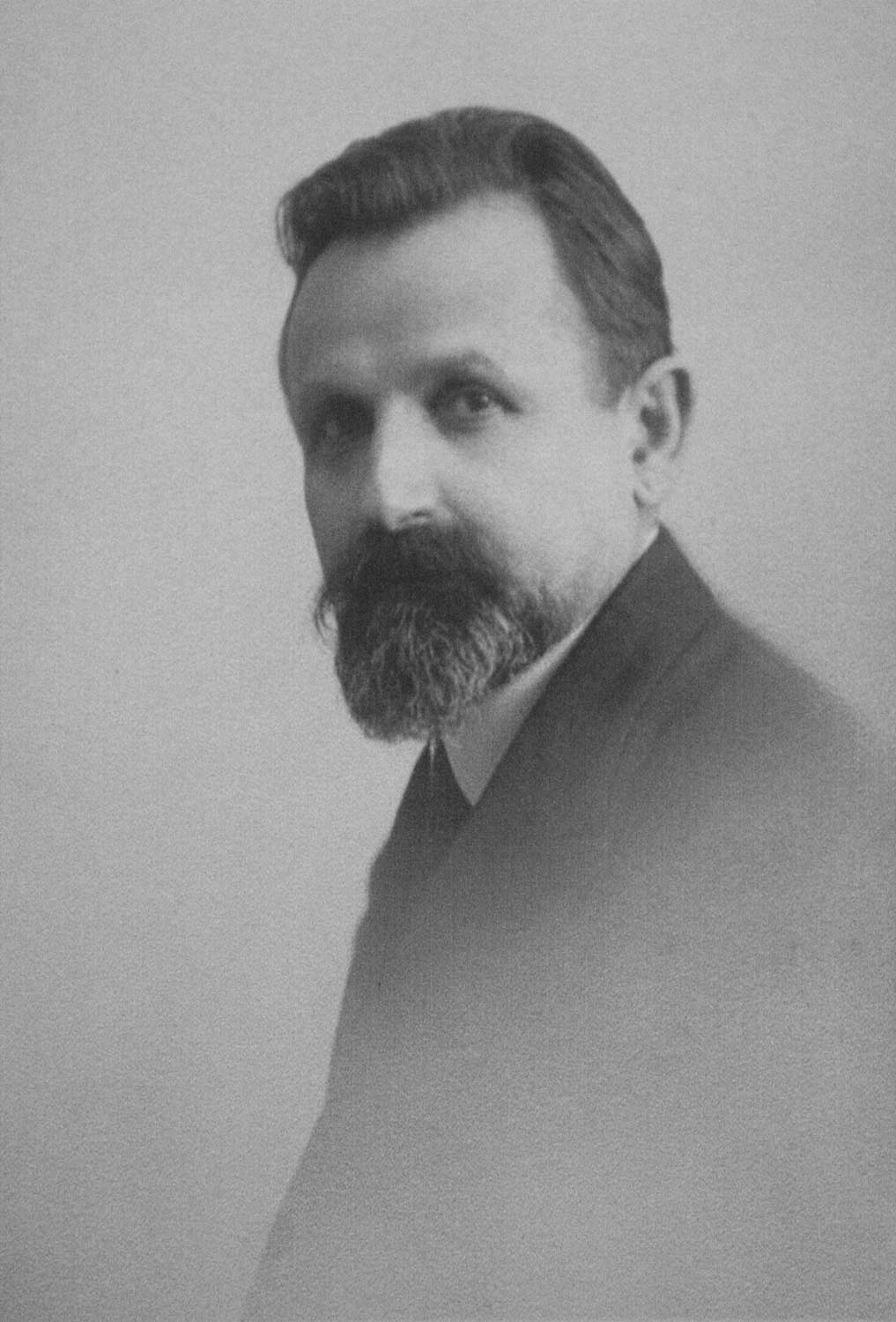
Avetis Aharonian

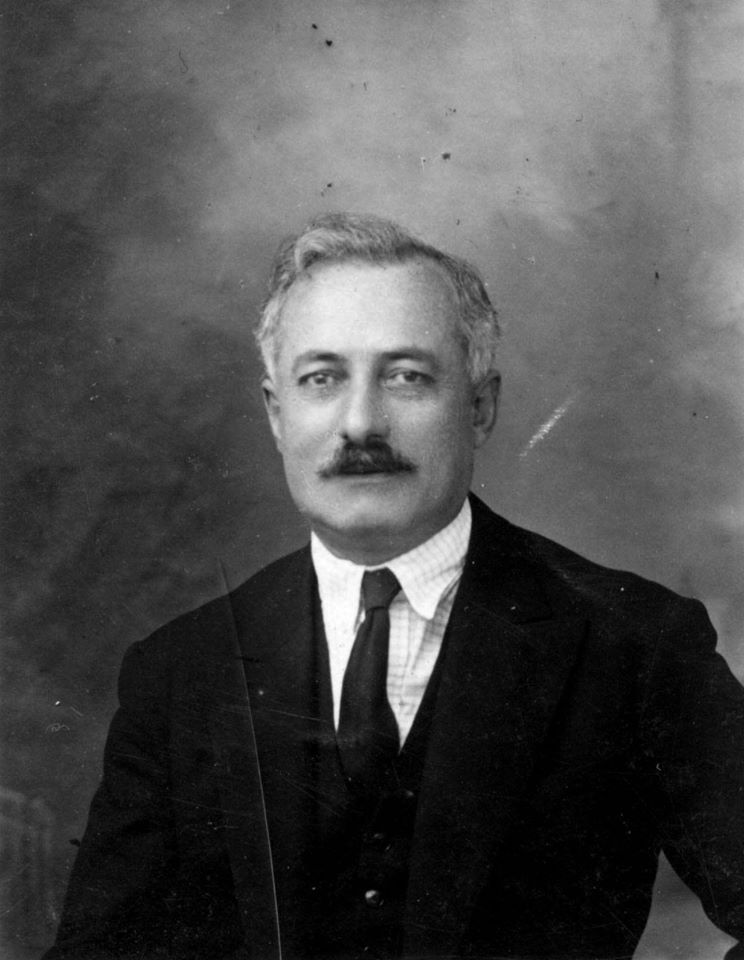
Ruben Ter Minasian

== Bibliography ==
- Hovannisian, Richard G. (1971). The Republic of Armenia: The First Year, 1918–1919. Vol. 1. Berkeley: University of California Press. ISBN 978-0520019843.
- Hovannisian, Richard G. (1982). The Republic of Armenia: From Versailles to London, 1919–1920. Vol. 2. Berkeley: University of California Press. ISBN 978-0520041868.
- Hovannisian, Richard G. (1996a). The Republic of Armenia: From London to Sèvres, February–August 1920. Vol. 3. Berkeley: University of California Press. ISBN 978-0520088030.
- Hovannisian, Richard G. (1996b). The Republic of Armenia: Between Crescent and Sickle: Partition and Sovietization. Vol. 4. Berkeley: University of California Press. ISBN 978-0520088047.
- "New Republics in the Caucasus: Armenia, Azerbaidjan, and Georgia: Their Mutual Relations and Their Present Status". Current History. 11 (3). University of California Press: 491–498. 1920. JSTOR 45325199.
