= 1919 Armenian parliamentary election =

- 21–23 June 1919
- All 80 seats in the National Assembly; 41 seats needed for a majority
- Turnout: 71%
Party	Leader	Vote %	Seats
ARF	Avetik Sahakyan	88.95	72
Esers	Arsham Khondkaryan	5.12	4
Muslim Non-Party Group	Asad Bey Aghabababeyov	3.54	3
AGM	Artashes Melkonyan	1.63	1
This lists parties that won seats. See the complete results below.
Prime Minister before	Elected Prime Minister
Alexander Khatisian; ARF	Alexander Khatisian; ARF

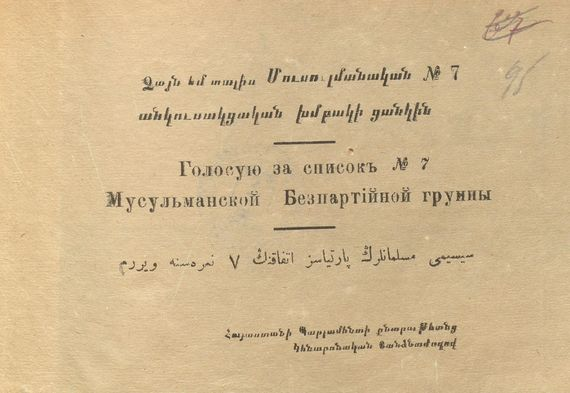
A ballot of Muslim Non-Party Group in three languages

Parliamentary elections were held in Armenia between 21 and 23 June 1919. The elections were boycotted by the Hunchaks and Populists and the result was a landslide victory for the Armenian Revolutionary Federation (ARF) which won 72 of the 80 seats. Voter turnout was 71%. The first republic ended with the Soviet takeover the following year.

The ARF originally won 73 seats, with one seat apparently assigned later to the Muslim faction, reducing the party's seat total to 72.

== Electoral system ==
The 80 seats in the National Assembly were elected via closed party-list proportional representation using the D'Hondt method in one national district. All citizens age 20 or over were eligible to participate.

== Results ==
Party	Votes	%	Seats
Armenian Revolutionary Federation	230,772	88.95	72
Socialist Revolutionary Party	13,289	5.12	4
Muslim Non-Party Group	9,187	3.54	3
Independent Peasants Union	4,224	1.63	1
Kurd Party	1,305	0.50	0
Armenian Populist Party	481	0.19	0
Assyrian Party	173	0.07	0
Total	259,431	100.00	80
Registered voters/turnout	365,000	–	
Source: Nohlen et al.

== Initial membership ==
The elected deputies of the parliament were:

№	Deputy	Party
1	Artashes Abeghyan	Armenian Revolutionary Federation
2	Nikol Aghbalian	Armenian Revolutionary Federation
3	Avetis Aharonian	Armenian Revolutionary Federation
4	Sargis Araratyan	Armenian Revolutionary Federation
5	Hovsep Arghutian	Armenian Revolutionary Federation
6	Nerses Avazian	Armenian Revolutionary Federation
7	Artashes Babalian	Armenian Revolutionary Federation
8	Khosrov Babayan	Armenian Revolutionary Federation
9	Varos Babayan	Armenian Revolutionary Federation
10	Gerasim Balayan	Armenian Revolutionary Federation
11	Perchuhi Partizpanyan-Barseghyan	Armenian Revolutionary Federation
12	Hovakim Budaghian	Armenian Revolutionary Federation
13	Arshak Jamalyan	Armenian Revolutionary Federation
14	Tigran Dsamhur	Armenian Revolutionary Federation
15	Arshak Ghazarian	Armenian Revolutionary Federation
16	Koriun Ghazazian	Armenian Revolutionary Federation
17	Abraham Giulkhandanian	Armenian Revolutionary Federation
18	Sirakan Grigorian	Armenian Revolutionary Federation
19	Martiros Harutiunian	Armenian Revolutionary Federation
20	Arshak Hovhannisian	Armenian Revolutionary Federation
21	Artashes Hovsepian (Malkhas)	Armenian Revolutionary Federation
22	Hovhannes Kajaznuni	Armenian Revolutionary Federation
23	Ruben Kadjberuni	Armenian Revolutionary Federation
24	Drastamat Kanayan	Armenian Revolutionary Federation
25	Smbat Khachatrian	Armenian Revolutionary Federation
26	Alexander Khatisian	Armenian Revolutionary Federation
27	Gevorg Khatisian	Armenian Revolutionary Federation
28	Vahan Khoreni	Armenian Revolutionary Federation
29	Garnik Kialashian	Armenian Revolutionary Federation
30	Armenak Maksapedan	Armenian Revolutionary Federation
31	Sargis Manasyan	Armenian Revolutionary Federation
32	Hmayak Manukian	Armenian Revolutionary Federation
33	Katarine Zalyan-Manukyan	Armenian Revolutionary Federation
34	Hovakim Melikian	Armenian Revolutionary Federation
35	Enovk Mirakian	Armenian Revolutionary Federation
36	Vahan Nalchadjian	Armenian Revolutionary Federation
37	Vahan Navasardian	Armenian Revolutionary Federation
38	Artashes Nazarian	Armenian Revolutionary Federation
39	Avetis Ohanjanian	Armenian Revolutionary Federation
40	Hamo Ohanjanyan	Armenian Revolutionary Federation
41	Vahan Papazian	Armenian Revolutionary Federation
42	Armen Garo	Armenian Revolutionary Federation
43	Levon Petrosian	Armenian Revolutionary Federation
44	Aram Safrastyan	Armenian Revolutionary Federation
45	Avetik Sahakyan	Armenian Revolutionary Federation
46	Varvara Sahakyan	Armenian Revolutionary Federation
47	Levon Sarafian	Armenian Revolutionary Federation
48	Eprem Sargsian	Armenian Revolutionary Federation
49	Haik Sargsian	Armenian Revolutionary Federation
50	Garo Sassouni	Armenian Revolutionary Federation
51	Arshak Sebouh	Armenian Revolutionary Federation
52	Levon Shant	Armenian Revolutionary Federation
53	Garnik Shahinian	Armenian Revolutionary Federation
54	Arshak Shirinian	Armenian Revolutionary Federation
55	Levon Tadeosian	Armenian Revolutionary Federation
56	Iusuf Bek Temurian	Armenian Revolutionary Federation
57	Hovsep Ter-Davitian	Armenian Revolutionary Federation
58	Mikayel Ter-Gevorgian	Armenian Revolutionary Federation
59	Mihran Ter-Grigorian	Armenian Revolutionary Federation
60	Hakob Ter-Hakobian	Armenian Revolutionary Federation
61	Gegham Ter-Harutiunian	Armenian Revolutionary Federation
62	Anushavan Ter-Mikayelian	Armenian Revolutionary Federation
63	Hovhannes Ter-Mikayelian	Armenian Revolutionary Federation
64	Ruben Ter Minasian	Armenian Revolutionary Federation
65	Hambardzum Terteryan	Armenian Revolutionary Federation
66	Vardan Ter-Torosian	Armenian Revolutionary Federation
67	Sirakan Tigranyan	Armenian Revolutionary Federation
68	Sahak Torosyan	Armenian Revolutionary Federation
69	Mikayel Varandian	Armenian Revolutionary Federation
70	Gevorg Varshamian	Armenian Revolutionary Federation
71	Simon Vratsian	Armenian Revolutionary Federation
72	Haik Yaghjian	Armenian Revolutionary Federation
73	Zakar Yolian	Armenian Revolutionary Federation
74	Arsham Khondkaryan	Socialist Revolutionary Party
75	Vahan Minakhoryan	Socialist Revolutionary Party
76	Levon Tumanian	Socialist Revolutionary Party
77	Davit Zubian	Socialist Revolutionary Party
78	Artashes Melkonian	Independent
79	Mirbaghir Mirbabayev	Muslim Non-Party Group
80	Asad Bey Aghabababeyov	Muslim Non-Party Group
