= Armenian National Council (1917–18) =

The Armenian National Council (Armenian: Հայոց Ազգային Խորհուրդ) was a permanent executive body formed by the Armenian National Congress in Tbilisi (then in the Russian Empire) in October 1917. The Council was responsible for creating the First Republic of Armenia in May 1918, the first independent Armenian state since the decline of the Khachen principality.

== Composition ==
The Council consisted of 15 members, under the chairmanship of Avetis Aharonian. Although the Armenian National Congress was dominated by the Dashnak Party, to compromise with other political groups, the Dashnaks only took six of the available seats on the council.

The original 15 members were as follows:

- Avetis Aharonyan (Dashnak Party), chairman
- Aram Manukian (Dashnak Party)
- Nikol Aghbalian (Dashnak Party)
- Ruben Ter-Minasian (Dashnak Party)
- Khachatur Karjikian (Dashnak Party)
- Artashes Babalian (Dashnak Party)
- Samson Harutiunian (Populist Party)
- Mikayel Papadjanian (Populist Party)
- Misha (Mikayel) Gharabekian (Social Democrat Party)
- Ghazar Ter-Ghazarian (Social Democrat Party)
- Haik Ter-Ohanian (Social Revolutionary Party)
- Anushavan Stamboltsian (Social Revolutionary Party)
- Stepan Mamikonian (Nonpartisan)
- Tigran Bekzadian (Nonpartisan)
- Petros Zakarian (Nonpartisan)

== Armenian independence ==
In May 1918, the Transcaucasian Federative Republic disintegrated. It had governed the peoples of former Russian-ruled Transcaucasia, including the Armenians, Georgians and Azerbaijanis. On 26 May, the Georgian National Council proclaimed the independence of Georgia and the Muslim National Council in Tbilisi followed by proclaiming the independence of Azerbaijan on 28 May. Since Armenians were at war with Turkey, the Armenian National Council was reluctant to proclaim Armenian independence, but decided it had no other option given the dissolution of the Trancaucasian Federative Republic, and the decision was announced on 30 May. This led to the creation of the Democratic Republic of Armenia.

== Peace treaty with the Ottoman Empire ==
The National Council then sent representatives to Batumi to negotiate a peace settlement with the Ottoman Empire, which was fighting the Armenians in the area near Yerevan. The Treaty of Peace and Friendship was signed on 4 June 1918. The treaty meant accepting territorial losses, especially in the provinces of Kars and Yerevan; a reduction of the Armenian Army; liberties for Muslims in the new state; and the right of the Ottoman Army to cross Armenian territory.

== Formation of a cabinet ==
On 9 June, the Armenian National Council asked the Dashnak politician Hovhannes Kachaznuni to form a government. The Dashnaks wanted it to be a coalition with other parties, feeling they were too inexperienced to rule alone. However, no other party enjoyed anything like the same degree of popular support. Wanting to impress European powers with their democratic form, the Dashnaks in forming the cabinet entered into a coalition with the Populists party, in which they equally held less than half the positions, with the ninth position being delegated to a non-partisan:

First Cabinet of the Armenian Republic
Position	Name	Party
Prime Minister	Hovhannes Kachaznuni	ARF
Foreign Affairs	Sirakan Tigranian	ARF
Internal Affairs	Aram Manukian	ARF
Welfare	Khachatur Kaijikian	ARF
Financial Affairs	Artashes Enfiadjian	Populist
Judicial Affairs	Samson Harutiunian	Populist
Enlightenment	Mikayel Atabekian	Populist
Provisions	Levon Ghulian	Populist
Military Affairs	Hovhannes Hakhverdian	Non-partisan

Following the controversial declaration of United Armenia upon the first anniversary of the Armenian Republic, on 28 May 1919, the Populists, directed by their party headquarters in Tiflis in a volte-face broke off from the Dashnak coalition government and subsequently boycotted the parliamentary elections some months later.

== Move to Yerevan ==
On 17 July, the Armenian National Council moved from Tbilisi to Yerevan. This was a controversial action as almost one million Russian Armenians did not live in Armenia proper but in Georgia, Azerbaijan and the North Caucasus. However, relations between the Council and the new Democratic Republic of Georgia had deteriorated to such a point that the Council no longer felt able to remain in Tbilisi. Georgian officials snubbed the Armenian politicians as they left. The Armenian National Council and the Cabinet travelled to Yerevan via Azerbaijani railroads, to avoid the areas under Ottoman occupation. In contrast to the Georgian response, Azerbaijani officials gave the Armenian officials a warm welcome with a banquet.

== The Council becomes the Khorhurd ==
Elections were impossible given the dire situation in Yerevan, thus the Dashnaks, Populists, Socialist Revolutionaries and Social Democrats decided to transform the Armenian National Council into a legislature (Armenian: Խորհուրդ, Khorhurd) for the new state by tripling its original membership of 15. As well as members of the four parties, the new legislature also included non-partisan Armenian politicians and representatives of minorities in the republic: six Muslims, one Yezidi and one Russian. The Khorhurd first convened on 1 August 1918 and was attended by dignitaries and emissaries of the Central Powers including observers from Austria-Hungary and the Ottoman Empire.

First Un-elected Khorhurd
Parties	Members
ARF	18
Social Revolutionaries	6
Social Democrat-Hnchakian	6
Populists	6
Muslims	6
Yezidi	1
Russian	1
Non-partisans	2
TOTAL	46

This parliamentary arrangement prevailed until the 1919 Armenian parliamentary election in which the ARF won a sweeping majority over all parties, and the Khorhurd's membership was increased up to 80 deputies.

== Sources ==
- Richard G. Hovannisian The Republic of Armenia: The First Year 1918–1919 (University of California, 1971)
- Rouben Paul Adalian Historical Dictionary of Armenia (Scarecrow Press, 2010)
- Michael A. Reynolds Shattering Empires: The Clash and Collapse of the Ottoman and Russian Empires 1908-1918 (Cambridge University Press, 2011)
