= Christophor Araratov =

Armenian general (1876–1937)

Christophor Araratian (Araratov)
- Armenian: Քրիստափոր Արարատեան; Russian: Христофор Араратов
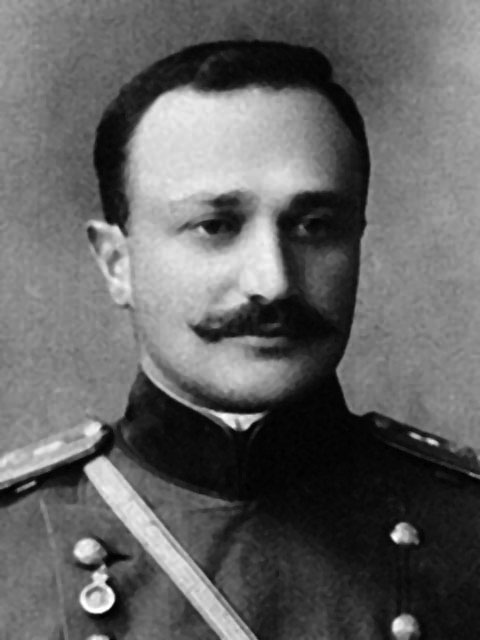
- Born: June 18, 1876; Tiflis, Tiflis Governorate, Russian Empire
- Died: December 10 1937 (aged 60–61); Yerevan, Armenian SSR, Soviet Union
- Military career
- Allegiance: Russian Empire (1890s–1917); Republic of Armenia (1918–1920); Soviet Union (1922)
- Branch: Army
- Service years: 1896–1922
- Rank: Major General
- Commands: Artillery brigade of Armed forces of First Republic of Armenia
- Conflicts: Russian-Japanese War; World War I; Caucasian Campaign; Battle of Sardarabad; Armenian National Liberation Movement; Turkish–Armenian War; Battle of Kars (1920) (POW)
- Awards: See below

Christophor Araratov (Armenian: Քրիստափոր Արարատեան; Kristap'or Araratian, Russian: Христофор Араратян (Араратов)) (June 18, 1876 – December 10, 1937), also known as Khachatur Araratian and Christapor Araratian, was an Armenian career officer of the Russian Imperial Army. He was promoted to the rank of major general of the Armenian army during its fight for independence during and after World War I. Araratov participated in the 1918 battles of Sardarapat and Karakilisa against the Turkish invaders.

Armenian-American historian Richard G. Hovannisian describes Christophor Araratov:

Minister of Military Affairs Kristapor Araratian was a relative latecomer to Armenian national affairs. As was not uncommon in the officer corps, he had been reared in a Russian milieu and had first served in the Caucasus during the world war. Distinguishing himself at the battle of Sardarabad as commander of the 2nd Artillery Brigade of the Armenian Corps, Colonel Araratian quickly advanced to the rank of major general. In March 1919 he was selected to replace Major General Hakhverdian as the nonpartisan military minister, a post he retained in the coalition, the interim, and [later] the regular cabinet of Alexandre Khatisian.

For having fought to establish the independence of the First Republic of Armenia, in 1937 during the Great Purge of Joseph Stalin, Araratov was arrested and executed on charges of nationalism. Following Stalin's death in 1953, the Soviet government began a period of rehabilitation, which was extended posthumously to many of the tens of thousands of Stalin's victims. Araratov was rehabilitated and his awards were officially restored to him (via his survivors). His achievements were again acknowledged in history books. Araratov during the short-lived Republic of Armenia was described to be a "jolly and honest" soldier.

== Early years ==
Christophor Araratov was born in a noble family on June 18, 1876, in Tiflis (present day capital of Georgia). His father, Karapet Avetikovich Araratov, was a lieutenant colonel of the Russian Imperial Army. At the age of 10, the young Araratov entered the Tbilisi cadet corps. He studied there for seven years and graduated in 1893. Thereafter, he entered Mikhaylov artillery school in Petersburg. Graduating from the academy in 1895, he won recognition as one of the three best students, which earned him the rank of a second lieutenant and right to choose the location of service. At the graduation ceremony, he was the head of Cavalry troops.

== First military experience ==
Araratov chose Caucasus grenadier artillery brigade to continue service, where he had the position of senior adjutant of the brigade head. Right after the outbreak of the Russian-Japanese War, he asked to be assigned to the front. His knowledge gained at the artillery school helped him gain a high reputation, and he was soon awarded his first medal for his innovations.

== First World War ==
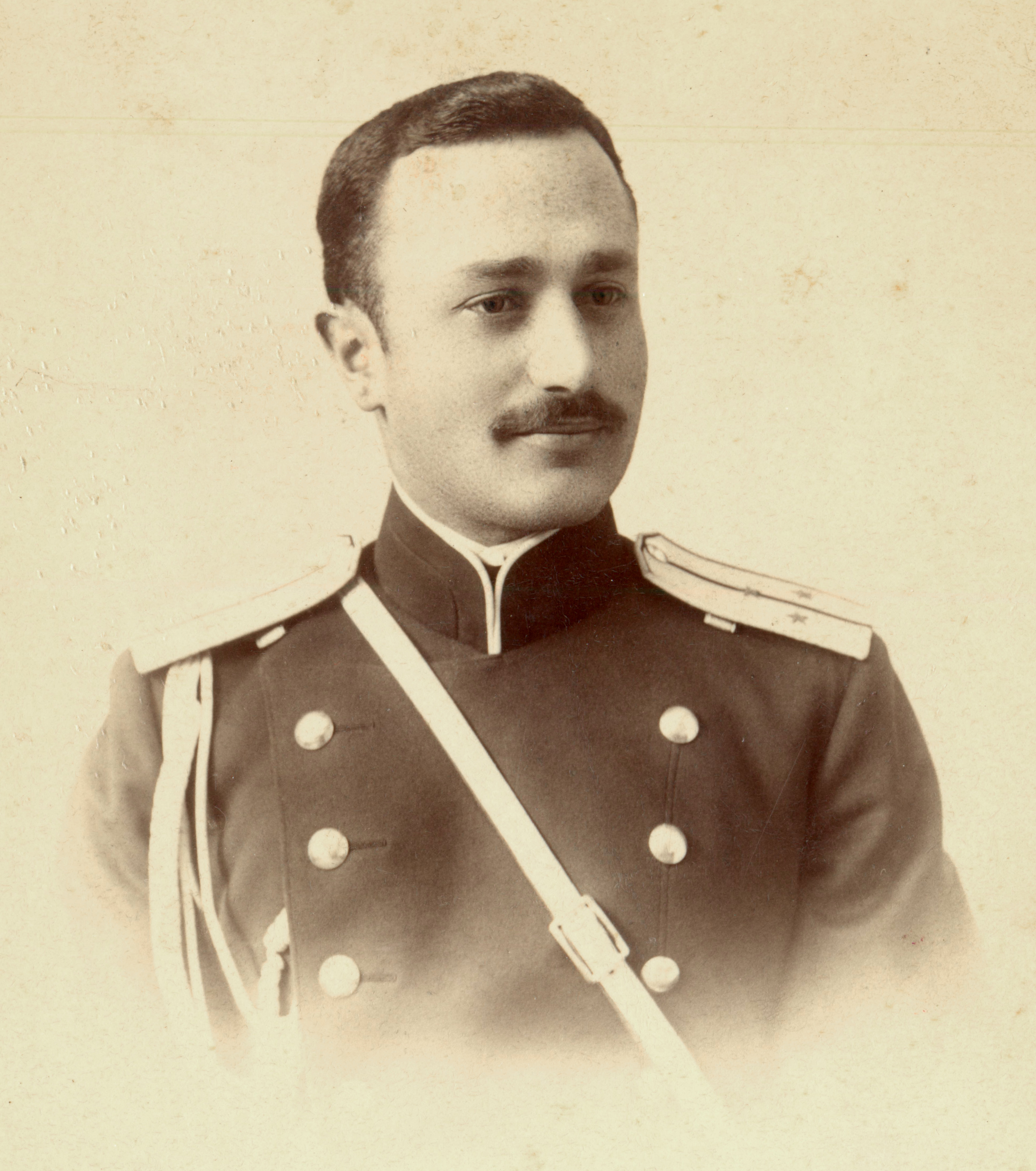
Christophor Araratov in 1907.

Araratov was in post-graduate studies at Officer School at Tsarskoye Selo, when World War I began. He aced his exams ahead of schedule and was assigned to the front. He served as a lieutenant colonel of his previous brigade. He was awarded numerous medals during the war. He was in Romania when the Bolshevik revolution took place in Russia and the new government announced its leaving the war. He realized that the Ottoman Empire would likely use the situation to enter Russian Armenia and the Caucasus.

On December 5, 1917, the armistice of Erzincan was signed between the Russians and Ottomans which ended the armed conflicts between Russia and the Ottoman Empire in the Caucasus Campaign. After the Bolshevik seizure of power, a multinational congress of Transcaucasian representatives met to create a provisional regional executive body known as Transcaucasian Seim. While Armenians sending representatives to Transcaucasian Seim, at the same time, the Eastern Armenian leaders at the Erivan tried to establish an Armenian Army Corps. With the efforts of Armenian National Council of Tiflis it was set up to fight against the Ottoman Empire in late 1917 and early 1918. Units of this corps were the basis of the army First Republic of Armenia. Armenians had planned to keep their existence based on a political strategy in the way of being supporting the Allies and Russia and to establish their national army with Russian support.

General Tovmas Nazarbekian was selected as the Commanding Officer (Sparapet of Armenia). The Sparapet of Armenia Tovmas Nazarbekian appreciated the talent and skills of the colonel. Yerevan assigned 1st Division with 1st Erzurum/Erzincan regiment, 2nd Khnus Regiment, 3rd Yerevan Regiment, and 4th Erzinjan/Yerevan Regiments under General Christophor Araratov. In 1918 he was the head of artillery brigade of Armenian army.

Following the Russian Revolution, Araratov who had previously been serving in the Romanian front moved to Kars where the staff of the brigade was located. On March 3, 1918, the Grand Vizier Talaat Pasha signed the Treaty of Brest-Litovsk with the Russian SFSR. It stipulated that Bolshevik Russia cede Batum, Kars, and Ardahan. Between March 14 – April 1918, the Trabzon peace conference was held between the Ottoman Empire and the delegation of the Transcaucasian Sejm. The representatives in Tiflis acknowledged the existence of a state of war between themselves and the Ottoman Empire. With the fall of Kars, Araratov realized that the government of Transcaucasian Seym was not interested in struggle against the invader: Caucasian Turks supported Turkey to gain an alliance in founding their own independent state.

On May 11, 1918, a new peace conference opened at Batum. At this conference the Ottomans extended their demands to include Tiflis as well as Alexandropol and Echmiadzin; they intended to build a railroad to connect Kars and Julfa with Baku. The Armenian and Georgian members of the Republic's delegation began to stall. Beginning on May 21, the Ottoman army moved ahead again. The conflict led to the Battle of Sardarapat (May 21–29), the Battle of Kara Killisse (1918) (May 24–28), and the Battle of Bash Abaran (May 23–29).

Kemal Asad, commander of 9th Infantry Division of Turkish army, sent a message to Kemal Esad, commander of Attacking Group of Forces, about Armenian artillery during Sardarapat Battle, commanded by Kristapor Araratov:

Your Excellency, I have honor to inform you the following. The attack we started two days ago in Bash-Aparan was not successful at first, because gyaurs [unfaithfuls] arranged significant forces there... Moreover Armenians had brilliant artillery brigade of mountain weapons, I don't know who was the commander, but he hit without a miss. He, damned by Allah, brought our artillery down and a number of heavy choppers, as well as made serious damage to our infantry...

During the Battle of Sardarapat, Araratov's artillery brigade fought bravely and took prisoners of a battery of Turkish soldiers. The victory at Sardarapat made Republic of Armenia independence possible.

After Sardarapat, Araratov was reassigned to the front against the Georgian Army, which occupied Lori in 1918. On October 30, the Armistice of Mudros was signed, and the Caucasus Campaign ended. The fights stopped before the New Year of 1919.

== First Republic of Armenia ==
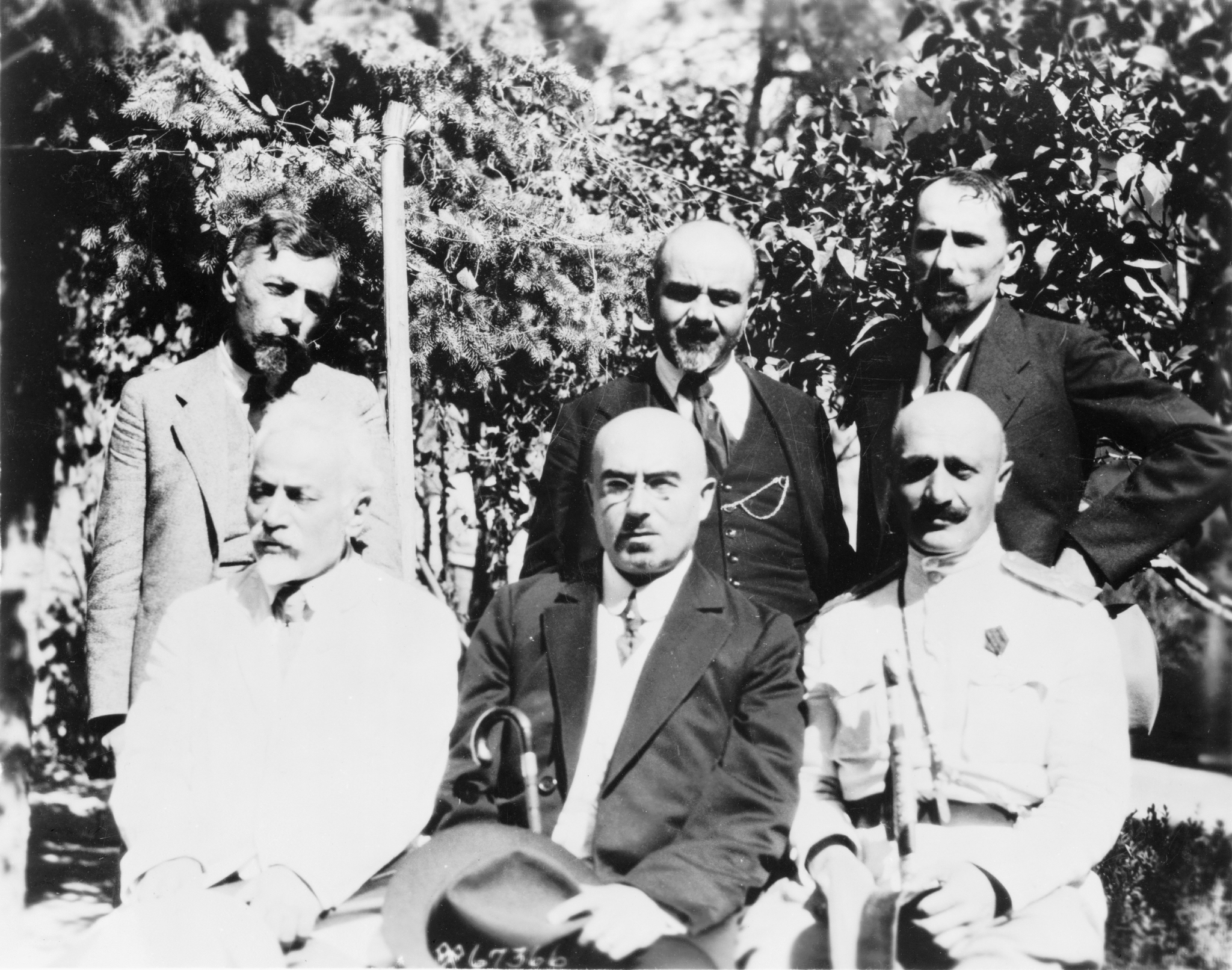
Members of the Second Cabinet, October 1, 1919. Sitting (left to right): Avetik Sahakyan, Alexander Khatisian, Christophor Araratov, Standing (left to right): Nikol Aghbalian, Abraham Gyulkhandanyan, Sargis Araratyan.

In the start of 1919, all around Armenia Azerbaijanis excited rebellions. In that unstable situation on April 16, 1919, Prime Minister Hovhannes Kajaznuni left for Tiflis to conduct negotiations there and Alexander Khatisian became Acting Premier, with Araratov as Minister of War from March 27. The latter had replaced Hovhannes Hakhverdyan on this post and was promoted to the rank of major general.

In April 1920 he was assigned to Kars as a military governor of the region. In October 1920, when the city yielded to Turks, he was taken prisoner by Turkey. Turkish General Kâzım Karabekir Pasha used to visit him in prison and offered him a chance to teach a course of Russian artillery at the Turkish military university. Araratov refused it several times.

In 24 years of military service from 1896 to 1920, Araratov only went on vacation for a total of about 3 months.

== Soviet Armenia period ==
At the end of 1921, Araratov was returned at the request of Aleksandr Myasnikyan to what was then Soviet Armenia. He took a position as head assistant of a rifle division. Later he was appointed as head of military chairs at Yerevan State University and then at National Economy Institute.

On September 2, 1937, during the Great Purge of Joseph Stalin, Araratov was arrested along with many other high-ranking military officers, who were accused of being "nationalists" and "anti-soviet activists" for their support of Armenian independence. After about three months, together with other heroes of Sardarapat: Movses Silikyan, Dmitry Mirimanov, Aghasi Varosyan, Stepan Ohanesyan, Hakob Mkrtchyan, and Harutyun Hakobyan, Araratov was taken on December 10 to Nork gorge and executed by a firing squad of the NKVD. Within Soviet territories, many more military and other suspected political enemies were executed.

The officers' awards were stripped from their names, their families were sometimes sent to labor camps in the gulag as enemies of the state, and the men's names were removed from history books.

== Rehabilitation ==
Following Stalin's death in 1953, the Soviet Union began rehabilitation of his victims of political repression. They first offered amnesty to prisoners held for non-political offenses, then began to release political prisoners as well. The government later rehabilitated numerous people posthumously, as they did for Araratov and Silikyan: restoring their medals and their places in history.

== Personal life ==
Araratov was married to a woman named Nina Ejubova and they had two children, Constantine and Elena. Elena was a very talented dancer whose career was greatly undermined on the basis that her father was executed as an enemy of the Soviet Union. Through her, he has a grandson, Yuriy Araratyan.

He was fluent in Armenian, Russian and French. His last name was banned under Soviet rule, due to Mount Ararat being associated with Armenian nationalism.

Famous Armenian writer and poet Khachik Dashtents wrote a poem about his teachers, among whom was Kristapor Araratov:

...Արարատովն էր մեզ զորաշարժի տանում`

Ղարսի հրացանը կապած ուսին...

...Araratov took us to military exercises,

With his Kars rifle over his shoulder...

== Legacy and honors ==
- (Russian Empire) Cross of St. George, 4th class (September 24, 1914)
- (Russian Empire) Order of Saint Stanislaus, 4th class with Swords and Bow (February 26, 1915)
- (Russian Empire) Order of Saint Stanislaus, 3rd class with Swords and Bow (March 1903)
- (Russian Empire) Order of Saint Stanislaus, 2nd class with Swords (December 1910)
- (Russian Empire) Order of St. Vladimir, 3rd class with Swords
- (Russian Empire) Order of St. Anna, 4th class, "For Courage" (January 6, 1916)
- (Russian Empire) Order of St. Anna, 3rd class with Swords and Bow (twice) (October 17, 1905, and April 27, 1916)
- (Russian Empire) Order of St. Anna, 2nd class with Swords (twice) (May 14, 1914, and June 5, 1915)
- (Russian Empire) Order of St. George, 4th class (August 26, 1916)
- (Russian Empire) Medal "In memory of Russian-Japanese War", Dark Bronze
- (Kingdom of Romania) Order of the Crown, Commander class with Swords (September 20, 1917)
- (Ottoman Empire) Turkish medal in memory of Armenian Government visiting of Turkish Commandership of Halil Pasha
