= Ministers of Social Protection of the First Republic of Armenia =

The Ministers of Social Protection of the First Republic of Armenia

== Introduction ==
The Ministry of Labor and Social Protection was formed in 1918.

== Ministers ==
The Ministers of Social Protection of the First Republic of Armenia:

Name	Date	Prime Minister
Khachatur Karchikyan	November 4, 1918 – November 11, 1918	
Levon Ghulyan	November 15, 1918 – December 13, 1918	
Christophor Vermishev	December 13, 1918 – February 7, 1919	
Sahak Torosyan	February 7, 1919 – June 24, 1919	
Hovhannes Ter-Mikaelyan	June 24, 1919 – August 15, 1919	
Avetik Sahakyan	August 15, 1919 – October 31, 1919	
Artashes Babalian	October 31, 1919 – May 5, 1920	
Sargis Araratyan	May 5, 1920 – November 25, 1920	
Hambardzum Terteryan	November 25, 1920 – December 2, 1920	
Aram Manukian		
Alexander Khatisian		
