= Ghulyan =

Ghulyan (Armenian: Ղուլյան) is an Armenian surname. Notable people with the surname include:

- Artak Ghulyan (1958–2025), Armenian architect and designer
- Levon Ghulyan, Armenian politician who served in 1918/1919

== See also ==
- Ashot Ghulyan, known as Bekor Ashot (1959–1992), Armenian military leader
