= Hovhannes Ter-Mikaelyan =

Armenian politician

Minister of Social Protection of the First Republic of Armenia
- In office June 24, 1919 – August 15, 1919
- Prime Minister: Alexander Khatisyan
- Preceded by: Sahak Torosyan
- Succeeded by: Avetik Sahakyan

Hovhannes Baghdasar Ter-Mikaelyan (Armenian: Հովհաննես Տեր-Միքայելյան) was an Armenian politician.

== Biography ==
Hovhannes Ter-Mikaelyan graduated from Medical Department of Kharkov University in 1898 and worked as an intern at University hospital till 1903. In 1907, he became the Head of Yerevan Hospital. In 1914, he joined the army and was appointed the assistant to the chief doctor of Yerevan military hospital. In 1917, Ter-Mikaelyan was appointed the doctor of brigade and occupied the position until March 1, 1919. From June 1 to August 1, 1918 he was a member of Yerevan National Assembly leadership. Later, they appointed him as the Assistant to the Minister of Labor and Public Assistance, and the acting Minister of Labor and Public Assistance (June 24-August 15, 1919). By the end of 1920, he frequently took over the responsibilities of the Minister.
