= Christophor Vermishyan =

Armenian politician

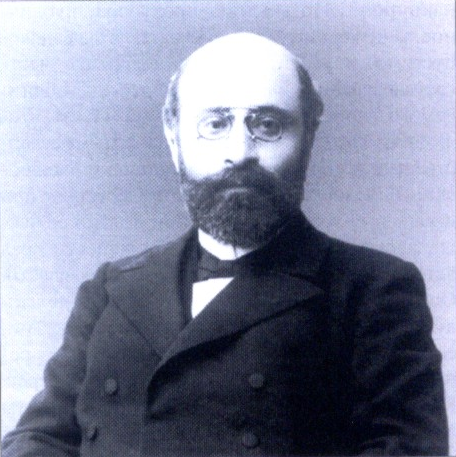

Minister of Provisions of the First Republic of Armenia
- In office Spring 1919 – June 24, 1919
- Prime Minister: Hovhannes Katchaznouni Alexander Khatisyan
- Preceded by: Levon Ghulyan
- Succeeded by: Sahak Torosyan

Minister of Social Protection of the First Republic of Armenia
- In office December 13, 1918 – February 7, 1919
- Prime Minister: Hovhannes Katchaznouni
- Preceded by: Levon Ghulyan
- Succeeded by: Sahak Torosyan

Personal details
- Born: January 1863 Tiflis
- Died: 1932
- Resting place: Armenian cemetery of Pyatigorsk

Christophor Avvakumyan Vermishyan(ts) (Armenian: Քրիստոփոր Վերմիշև; January 1863 in Tiflis – 1932) was an Armenian politician who served as Minister of Social Protection of the First Republic of Armenia from 1918 to 1919 and as Minister of Provisions of the First Republic of Armenia in 1919.

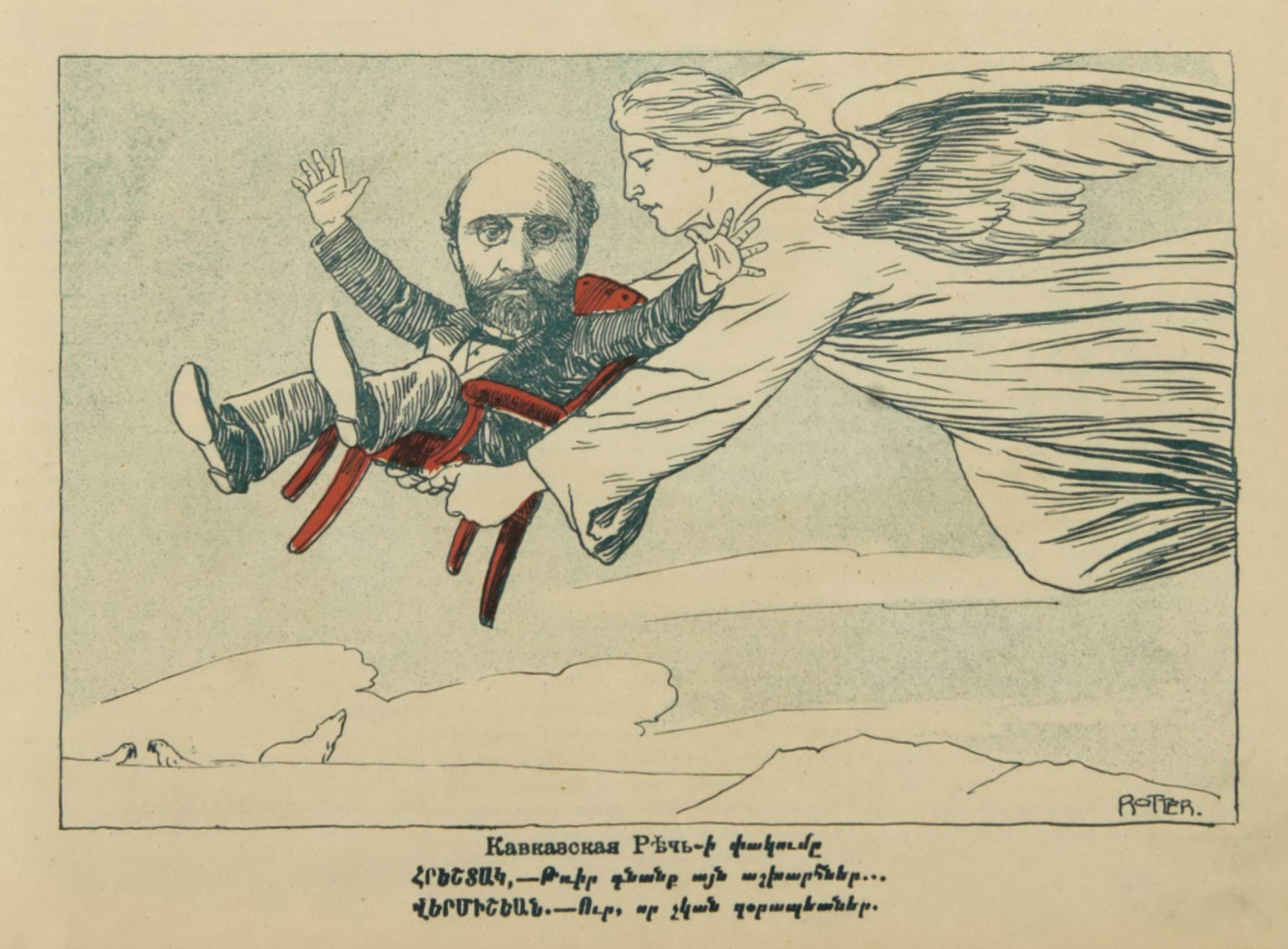
Cartoon of Christophor Vermishyan published in Tbilisi-based Armenian satirical periodical Khatabala after closing of Kavkazskaya rech (newspaper)
