= Ruben Ter Minasian =

Armenian politician and revolutionary

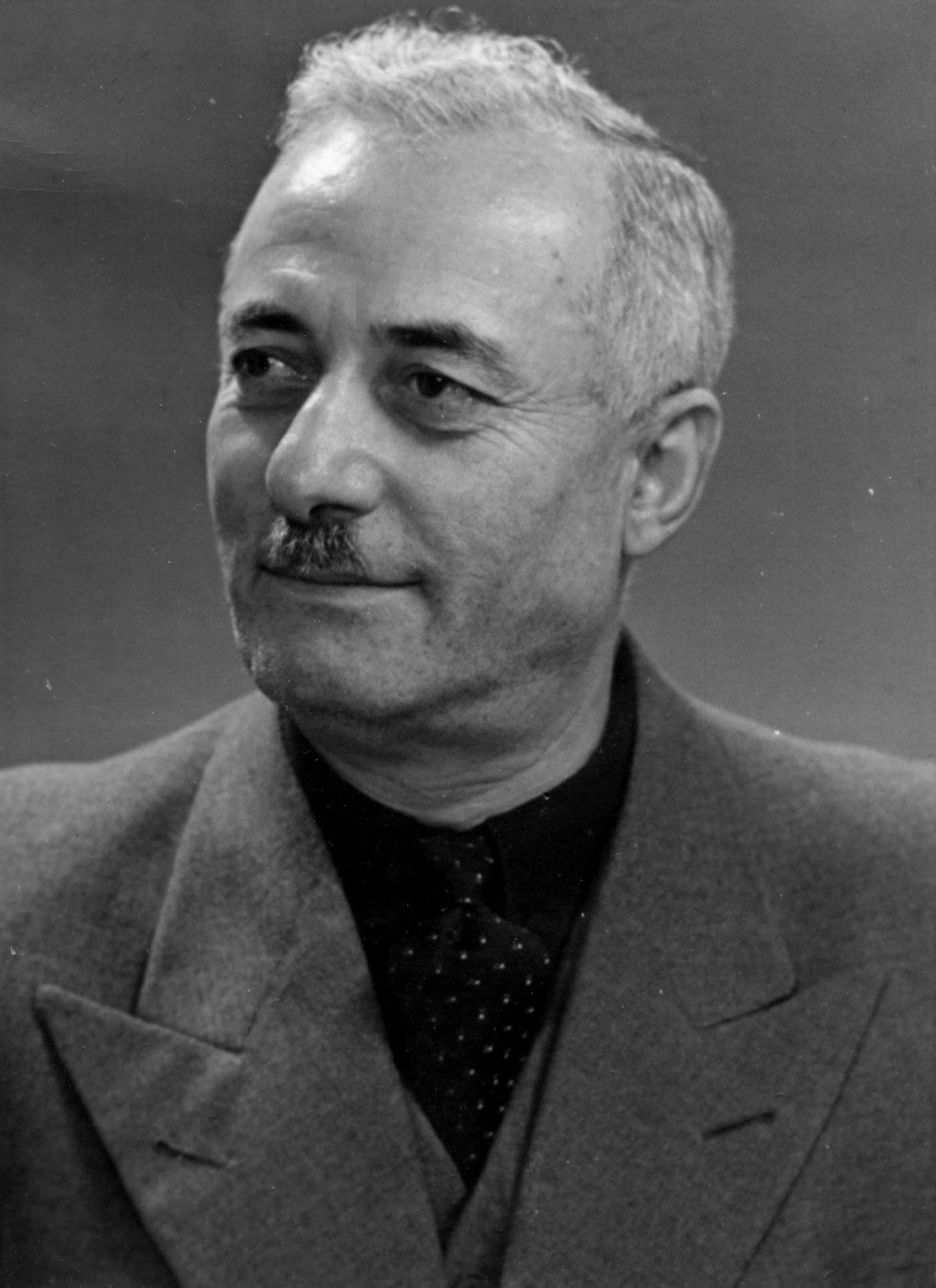

Defense Minister of Armenia
- In office 5 May 1920 – 24 November 1920
- Prime Minister: Hamo Ohanjanyan
- Preceded by: Christophor Araratov
- Succeeded by: Drastamat Kanayan

Interior Minister of Armenia
- In office 5 May 1920 – 24 November 1920
- Prime Minister: Hamo Ohanjanyan
- Preceded by: Abraham Gyulkhandanyan
- Succeeded by: Sargis Araratyan

Personal details
- Born: Minas Ter Minasian; 1882 Akhalkalaki, Tiflis Governorate, Russian Empire
- Died: November 1951 (aged 68–69) Paris, France
- Resting place: Père Lachaise Cemetery
- Party: Armenian Revolutionary Federation

Ruben Ter Minasian (Note: Reformed orthography: Ռուբեն Տեր-Մինասյան. Often referred to simply as Ruben. Also spelled Rouben, Roupen Ter-Minasian, Ter Minassian, and Der Minassian) (Armenian: Ռուբէն Տէր Մինասեան; 1882–1951) was an Armenian politician and revolutionary of the Armenian Revolutionary Federation (ARF) who played an important role in the Armenian national liberation movement and later in the First Republic of Armenia.

== Early life ==
Ruben Ter Minasian was born Minas Ter Minasian on 7 May 1882 in Akhalkalaki in the Tiflis Governorate of the Russian Empire to Armenian parents. Ter Minasian's family, like many other Armenians in Akhalkalaki, had immigrated to the Russian Empire from Erzurum in the Ottoman Empire. Ruben was the youngest of seven children. After losing his father at a young age, he was raised by his mother and his oldest brother Harutiun. He attended a local Armenian community school before being sent to be educated at the Gevorgian Seminary at Etchmiadzin at the age of eleven or twelve. Ruben joined the Armenian Revolutionary Federation (ARF-Dashnaktsutiun) and in 1902 was sent to Batum on a party assignment. In 1903, he left for Moscow and attended classes as an unregistered student at the Lazarian Institute. He was then admitted to a Russian military school in Tomsk and became a reserve officer of the Russian army. Already holding anti-Tsarist views, he returned to the Caucasus at the start of or shortly before the Russo-Japanese War in 1904 in order to avoid being called up for service and sent to Manchuria.

== Revolutionary activities, Armenian Genocide and World War I ==
Ruben was sent by the ARF to Kars, then a hotspot of ARF revolutionary activity. Then he went to Yerevan where he became acquainted with Nikol Duman. They went to Persia together in 1904, where Ter Minasian established contacts with a number of prominent revolutionaries. On June 26, 1904, Nikol Duman's group (which consisted of Sarpaz Khecho, Hakob Zavriev, and two soldiers from Javakheti named Suren and Grish) tried to cross the border into the Ottoman Empire to reach Sasun in the region of Taron, but the band fell into a trap on the Turkish-Persian border at Razi and were attacked by Kurdish fighters who forced them to return to Salmast. Then, along with Vardan Shahbaz (Minas Tonikyan), Ruben crossed the border near St. Tadevos monastery and traveled to Van in 1905.

From 1905-1906 Ruben conducted organizational work with local fedayi leader Vana Ishkhan (Nikoghayos Mikayelian) for the self-defense of the Armenian villages of the Rshtunik (Lernapar) region. In 1906, due to tactical differences with Ishkhan, Ruben left Van and went to Sasun to join with fedayi leader Gevorg Chavush. 1906-1907 he collaborated with the mayor of Taron, Gevorg Chavush and Spaghanats Makar and other local residents, trying to reconcile them. During that time, he participated in a series of fierce battles. In May 1907, he was with Gevorg's fedayee group in the village of Soulukh, when the village was surrounded by Turkish troops commander Kyosha Binbashi. Gevorg Chavush was wounded in the ensuing battle and died of his wounds soon after. After Gevorg's death, Ter Minasian became commander of the ARF's forces in Sasun. After the Battle of Soulukh, he helped Gevorg Chavush's family flee to Van, sending Aram Manukian with them.

From 1907-1908 he repeatedly negotiated with local Kurdish military leaders. Guided by the decisions of the Fourth General Assembly of the ARF, the fedayees left Sasun for the Caucasus. At the end of 1908, Ruben passed through Sasun to Khnus, then to Van, and from there to Kars. After some time in Kars, Ruben went to Varna, Bulgaria to attend the ARF's Fifth World Congress, and then went to Geneva, where he resumed his studies and taught at Geneva University.

In 1913 Ruben was summoned to Mush in Ottoman Armenia. He worked as the director of several Armenian schools in Mush. In 1915, during the Armenian genocide he led the defense of Sasun against Ottoman forces. He was the sole survivor after a single Turkish shell killed the entire leadership of the defense. After 7 months of fighting, he instructed that anyone who can flee and save themselves. Sasun was captured and its Armenian population massacred. With a handful of his comrades Ruben was able to break through enemy lines and reach the positions of the Russian troops in Khnus. He then participated in Sebouh Nersesian and Sebastatsi Murad's "One Armenian, One Gold" initiative aimed at saving Armenian orphans from the Kurds and helping Armenian refugees.

In 1917 Ruben went to Tiflis. He represented the ARF in negotiations with the head of the Baku Communists Stepan Shahumyan and with other local Bolshevik leaders. That year he also became a member of the Armenian National Council. He was an advisor to the Transcaucasian Sejm's delegation at the Trebizond negotiations with the Ottoman Empire in March 1918.

== First Republic of Armenia ==
After the declaration of independence of Armenia on May 28, 1918 (which he was opposed to) and at the demand of Aram Manukian, he came to Yerevan with other members of the Armenian Government in June 1918. At the ARF's Ninth World Congress in 1919, he was elected a member of the ARF Bureau, the party's top decision-making body and effectively the primary policy-making body of the First Republic of Armenia. Ruben remained a member of the ARF Bureau until his death. The First Republic of Armenia was faced with extremely dire circumstances, including a refugee crisis from Western Armenia, internal rebellion by Armenian Bolsheviks and local Caucasian Tatars (i.e. Azerbaijanis), and territorial disputes with neighboring Azerbaijan and Georgia. After the failed May Uprising of 1920 against the ARF-led government by the Armenian Bolsheviks, Ter Minasian and Simon Vratsian were given practically unlimited powers by Prime Minister Hamo Ohanjanyan to re-establish order. From May to November 1920 he occupied the posts of Minister of Internal Affairs and Minister of Defense in Hamo Ohanjanyan's government. After the suppression of the May Uprising, Ter Minasian directed a successful military campaign with veteran fedayi commander Drastamat Kanayan against Muslim rebels in the Zangibasar and Vedibasar districts to the south of Yerevan, resettling Armenian refugees in the abandoned Muslim villages and advancing toward Nakhichevan by the end of July 1920. Before they could restore Armenian control over Nakhichevan, they were intercepted by the Red Army, which occupied parts of Karabakh, Zangezur and Nakhichevan to establish an overland link with Kemalist Turkey.

When Turkish forces invaded Armenia in September 1920, Ter Minasian traveled to Tiflis to try and convince the Georgian government to ally with Armenia against Turkey, which was rejected.

== Exile and death ==
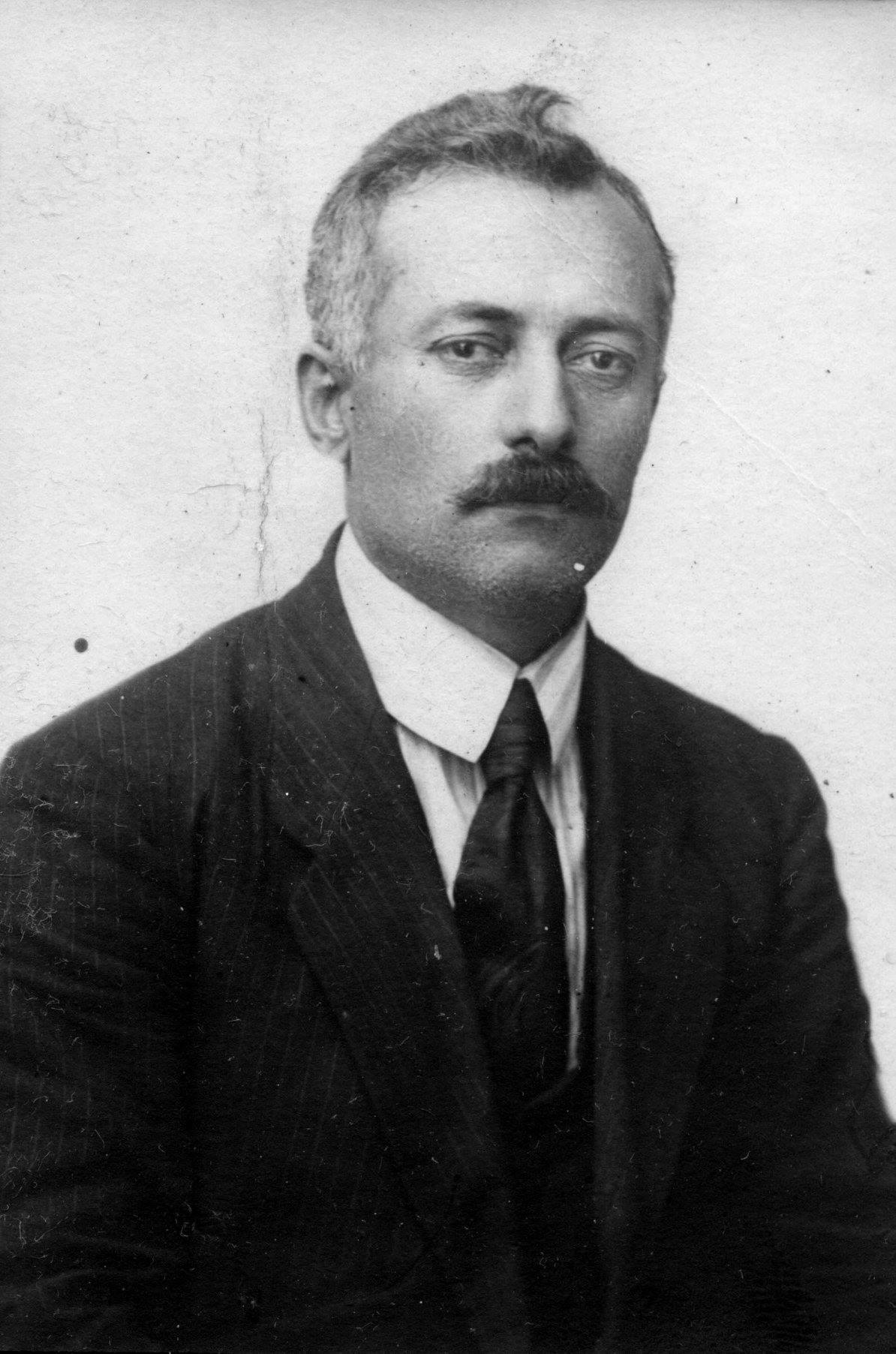
Ruben Ter Minasian, probably in the 1930s.

After the fall of the First Republic of Armenia to Soviet forces in December 1920, he went to Zangezur, where ARF forces under the leadership of Garegin Nzhdeh had declared the Republic of Mountainous Armenia and continued anti-Soviet resistance. Ruben stayed in Zangezur for some time. Soon after he fled to Iran with Garegin Nzhdeh's army and then moved to Paris to continue his intellectual and political activities. In the years that followed, he traveled to Palestine and Egypt, disseminating the ideology of the ARF. He returned to Paris with his family in 1948. There he wrote for the ARF's Hairenik newspaper and wrote his memoirs, which were released after his death in 7 separate volumes titled "Memoirs of an Armenian Revolutionary." He died on November 27, 1951, at the age of 68. His remains were buried at Père Lachaise Cemetery in Paris on November 30, 1951. Throughout his life he had an anti-Soviet orientation and was considered one of the enemies of the USSR.

His son Leon Ter Minasian married Anahide Ter Minassian, a prominent scholar of Armenian history.

== Works ==
- Հայ յեղափոխականի մը յիշատակները [Memoirs of an Armenian Revolutionary], 7 volumes. Published in English as Armenian Freedom Fighters: The Memoirs of Rouben Der Minasian. Boston: Hairenik Association, 1963. Translated by James Garabed Mandalian.
- Հայաստան միջցամաքային ուղիներու վրայ եւ Մ. Արեւելքի ժողովուրդներ եւ երկրներ [Armenia on the Inter-Continental Roads and Peoples and Countries of the Middle East]. Beirut, 1948.
- Հայ-թրքական կնճիռը [The Armenian-Turkish Knot], Cairo, 1924.
- Հ. Յ. Դ. կազմակերպութիւնը [Organization of the A.R.F.], Athens, 1935.
- Սթալինեան Սահմանադրութիւնը եւ Հ. Յ. Դաշնակցութիւնը [The Stalinist Constitution and the A. R. Federation], Cairo, 1936.

== Sources ==
- Hovannisian, Richard G. (1974). "Dimensions of Democracy and Authority in Caucasian Armenia, 1917-1920". The Russian Review. 33 (1): 37–49. doi:10.2307/127620.
- Hovannisian, Richard G. (1969). "Simon Vratzian and Armenian Nationalism". Middle Eastern Studies. 5 (3): 192–220. doi:10.1080/00263206908700129.
- Mandalian, James G. (1963). "Rouben Ter Minasian [1882–1951]". Hairenik.
- Nersisyan, Ashot (2003). Ṛubēn (PDF) (in Armenian). Erevan: Zeytʻun hratarakchʻutʻyun. ISBN 99930-913-4-0. OCLC 69015849.
- Ter Minassian, Anahide (1993). "The Role of the Individual: The Case of Rouben Ter Minassian". Armenian Review. 46 (1–4): 183–201.
- Walker, Christopher J. (1990). Armenia: The Survival of a Nation (2nd ed.). London: Routledge. ISBN 0-415-04684-X.
