= Khachatur Karchikyan =

Armenian politician

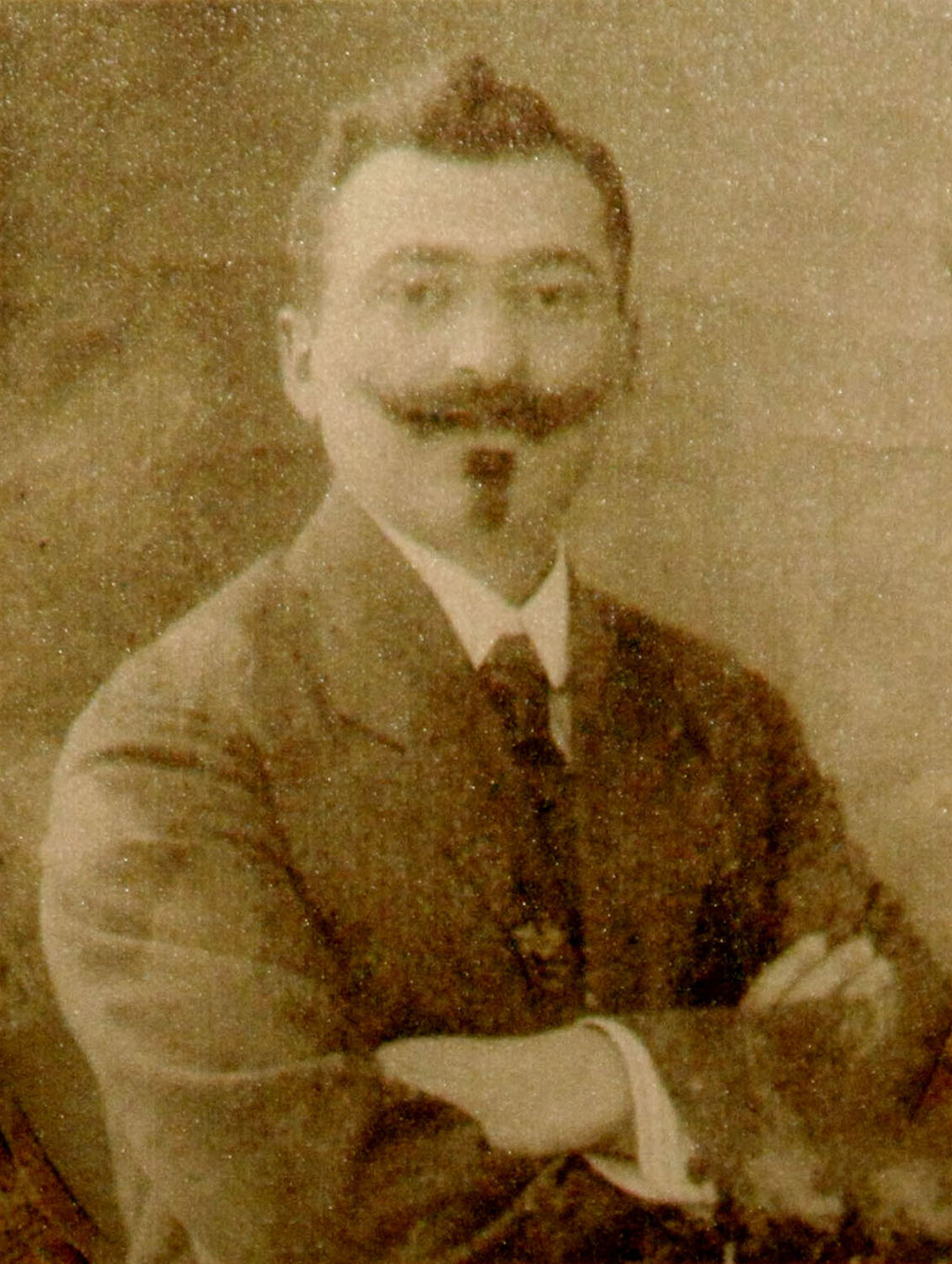

Minister of Social Protection of the First Republic of Armenia
- In office November 4, 1918 – November 11, 1918
- Prime Minister: Hovhannes Katchaznouni
- Preceded by: Position created
- Succeeded by: Levon Ghulyan

Personal details
- Born: 1882 Vagharshapat, Armenia
- Died: 1918 (aged 35–36) Yerevan

Khachatur Hovhannes Karchikyan (Armenian: Խաչատուր Հովհաննեսի Կարճիկյան; 1882–1918) was an Armenian politician, state figure, a member of the ARF (Armenian Revolutionary Federation).

In 1914–1918, being a member of the Armenian National Bureau, he participated in the Armenian volunteer movement organization. After the February Revolution of 1917, he became the adviser of H. Zavryan, the General of Western Armenia (created by the interim Government) and the first Deputy Head of the Commissariat. Khachatur was also a member of the Armenian National Council. In November, 1917 he assumed the position of the Minister of Finance in Transcaucasian Commissariat.

In July, 1918 he was appointed the Minister of Finance of the first Government, and the acting Minister of Justice. On November 4 of the same year, Karchikyan was appointed the Minister of Labor and Public Assistance in the newly formed Coalition Government, meantime sharing the responsibilities of the Minister of Finance. He was killed in his cabinet by a military officer of the “Dashnaktsutyun” party, Egor Ter-Minasyan on November 11, 1918.

In a letter to his wife, the first prime minister of Armenia, Hovhannes Kajaznuni, described Karchikian as the "strongest member" in the cabinet, and "perhaps the only statesman among us".
