= Armenian Populist Party =

The Armenian Populist Party (Armenian: Հայ Ժողովրդական Կուսակցություն) was a political party founded in March 1917 in Russian Armenia. Its members had previously belonged to the Russian Kadet party. The Populists had a liberal programme and drew their support from middle-class Armenians in Tbilisi and Baku.

== History ==
The Populists had 43 of the 204 representatives in the Armenian National Congress of October 1917 and two of the 15 seats in the subsequent Armenian National Council.

In 1921 the representatives of the party who emigrated following the sovetization of Armenia united the paty with three other Armenian parties, establishing Armenian Democratic Liberal Party.

== See also ==
- Programs of political parties in Armenia
- Politics of Armenia

== Sources ==
- Richard G. Hovannisian The Republic of Armenia: The First Year 1918-19 (University of California, 1971)
- Anahide Ter-Minassian La République d'Arménie 1918-20 (Éditions Complexe, 2006 ed.)
