= Hambardzum Terteryan =

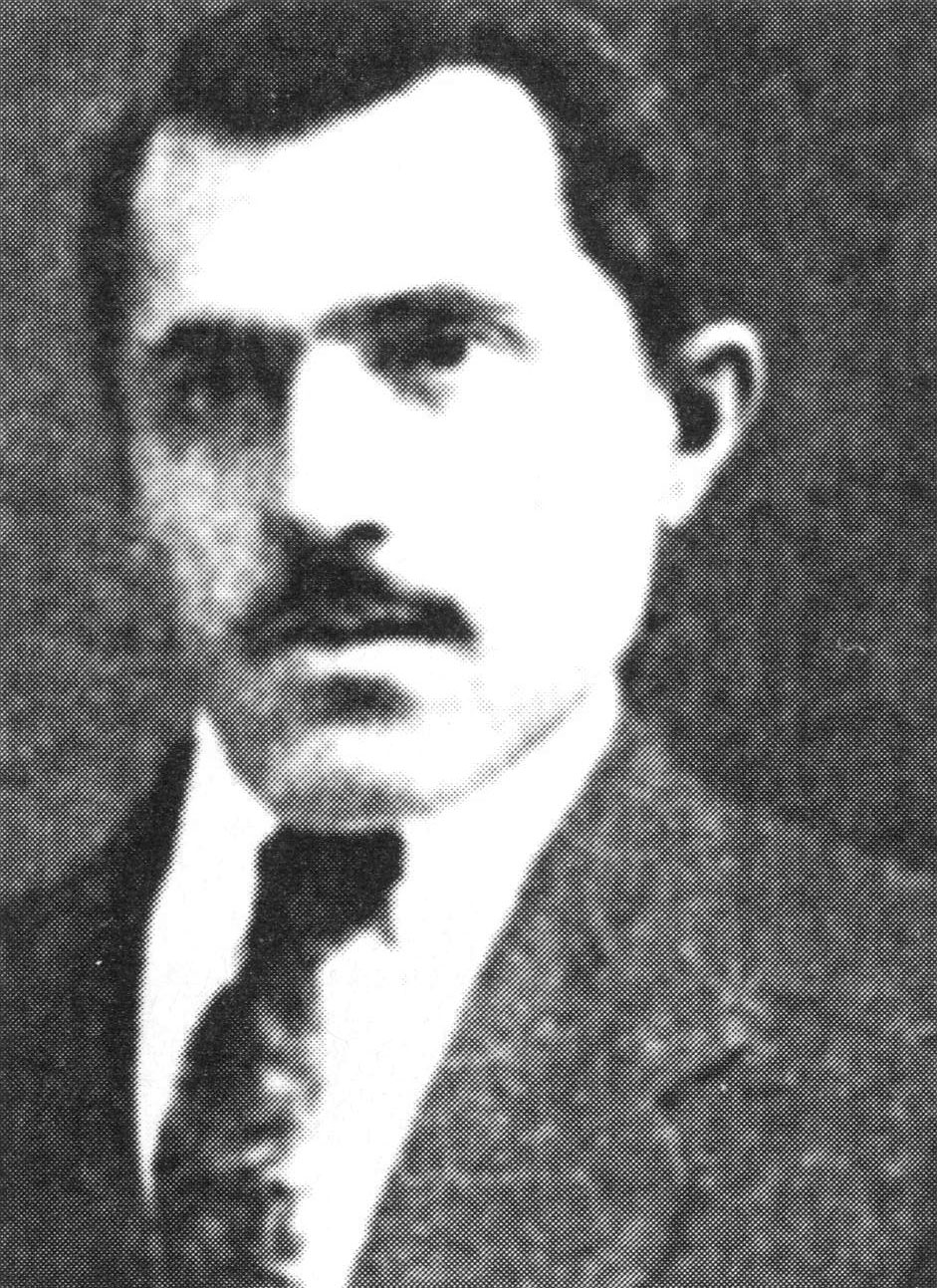

Minister of Social Protection of the First Republic of Armenia
- In office November 25, 1920 – December 2, 1920
- Prime Minister: Simon Vratsyan
- Preceded by: Sargis Araratyan
- Succeeded by: ?

Personal details
- Born: 1884 Nakhichevan-on-Don
- Died: Unknown

Hambardzum Manvel Terteryan (Armenian: Համբարձում Տերտերյան, born 1884) was the leader of the Armenian Revolutionary Federation in Nor Nakhichevan. He became a member of the National Assembly of Armenia in June 1919. In the summer of 1920, he participated in Armenian-Russian negotiations held in Moscow and Yerevan. From November 25 to December 2, 1920, he was the Minister of Finance and acting Minister of Reconstruction and Public Assistance of Armenia.
