= Arshak Jamalyan =

Armenian politician (1882–1940)

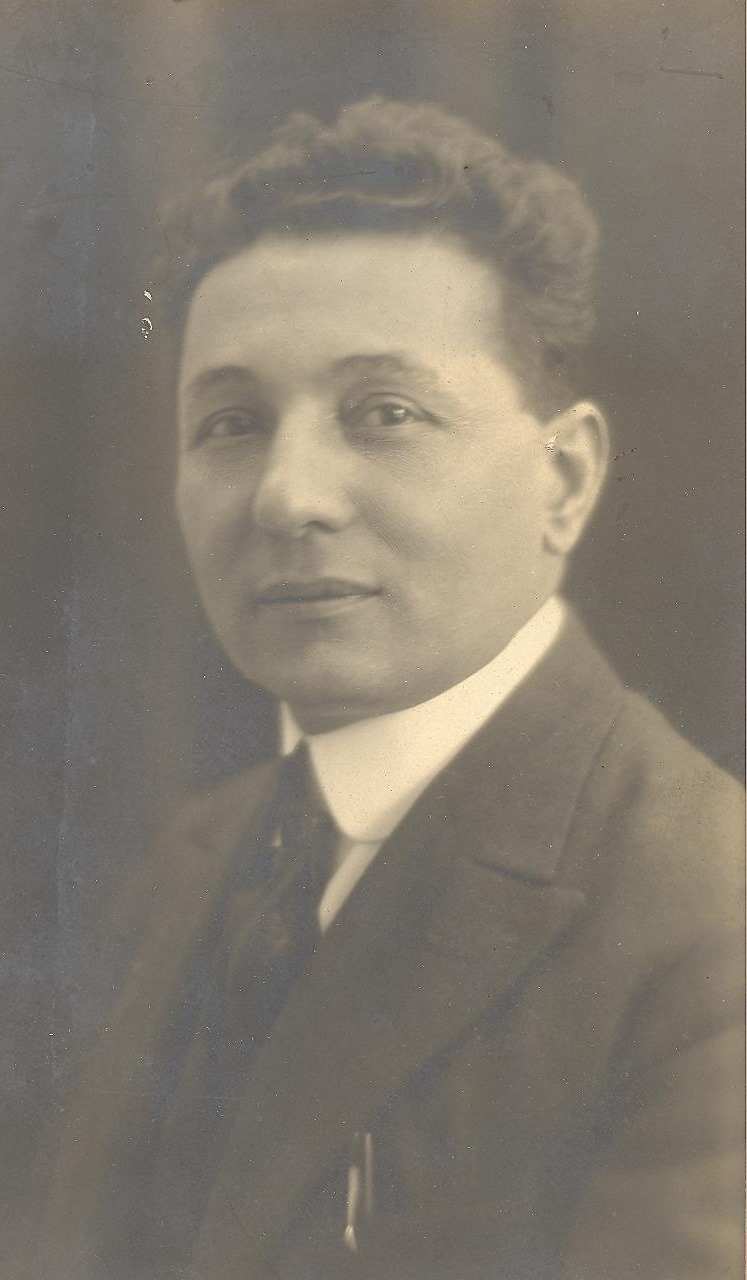

Minister of Communication of the First Republic of Armenia
- In office April 3, 1920 – November 23, 1920
- Preceded by: Position created
- Succeeded by: Arsham Khondkaryan

Personal details
- Born: 1882 Ganja
- Died: 1940 (aged 57–58) Paris

Arshak Jamalyan sometimes Arshag Djamalian (Armenian: Արշակ Ջամալեան (Իսահակեան) 1882 in Ganja - 1940 in Paris) was an Armenian politician. He was a prominent Dashnak member who took part in the Armenian-Azeri conflicts. Jamalian was also the Minister of Communications to Tiflis. who served as Minister of Communication of the First Republic of Armenia in 1920.
