= Samson Harutyunyan =

Armenian politician

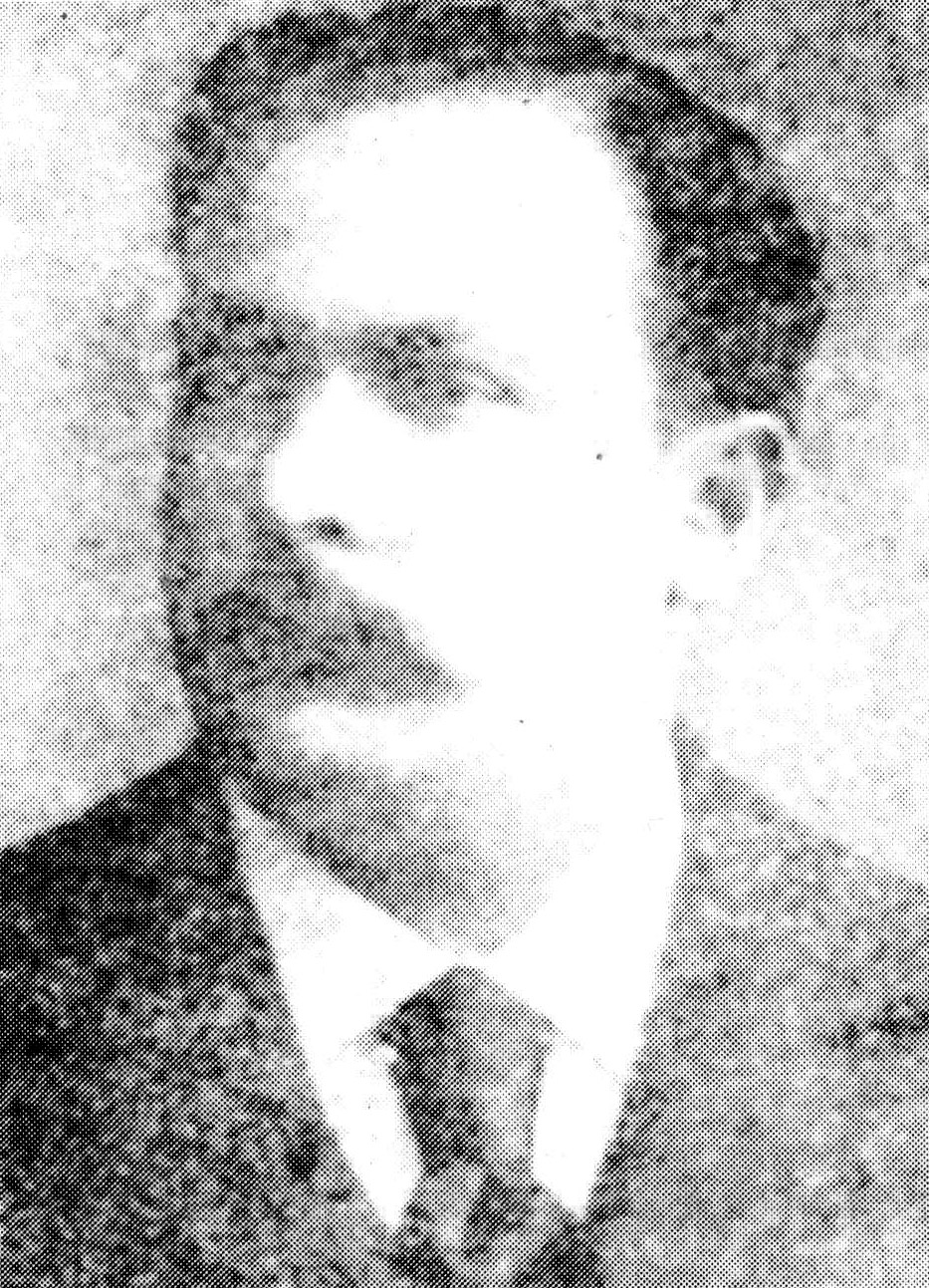

Minister of Justice of the First Republic of Armenia
- In office 4 November 1918 – Spring 1919
- Prime Minister: Hovhannes Katchaznouni
- Preceded by: Position created
- Succeeded by: Harutyun Chmshkyan

Samson Harutyunyan (Armenian: Սամսոն Հարությունյան) was an Armenian politician who served as Minister of Justice of the First Republic of Armenia from 1918 to 1919.

In a letter to his wife, the first prime minister of Armenia, Hovhannes Kajaznuni, described Harutyunyan as having "been in public life for many years", adding: "he has been in public life for many years, he has experience and energy, but he is poor both in mind and spirit, he is a small person who can successfully manage small affairs, but the state scale is beyond him. of abilities. On top of all that, there is cunning and intrigue."
