= Sahak Torosyan =

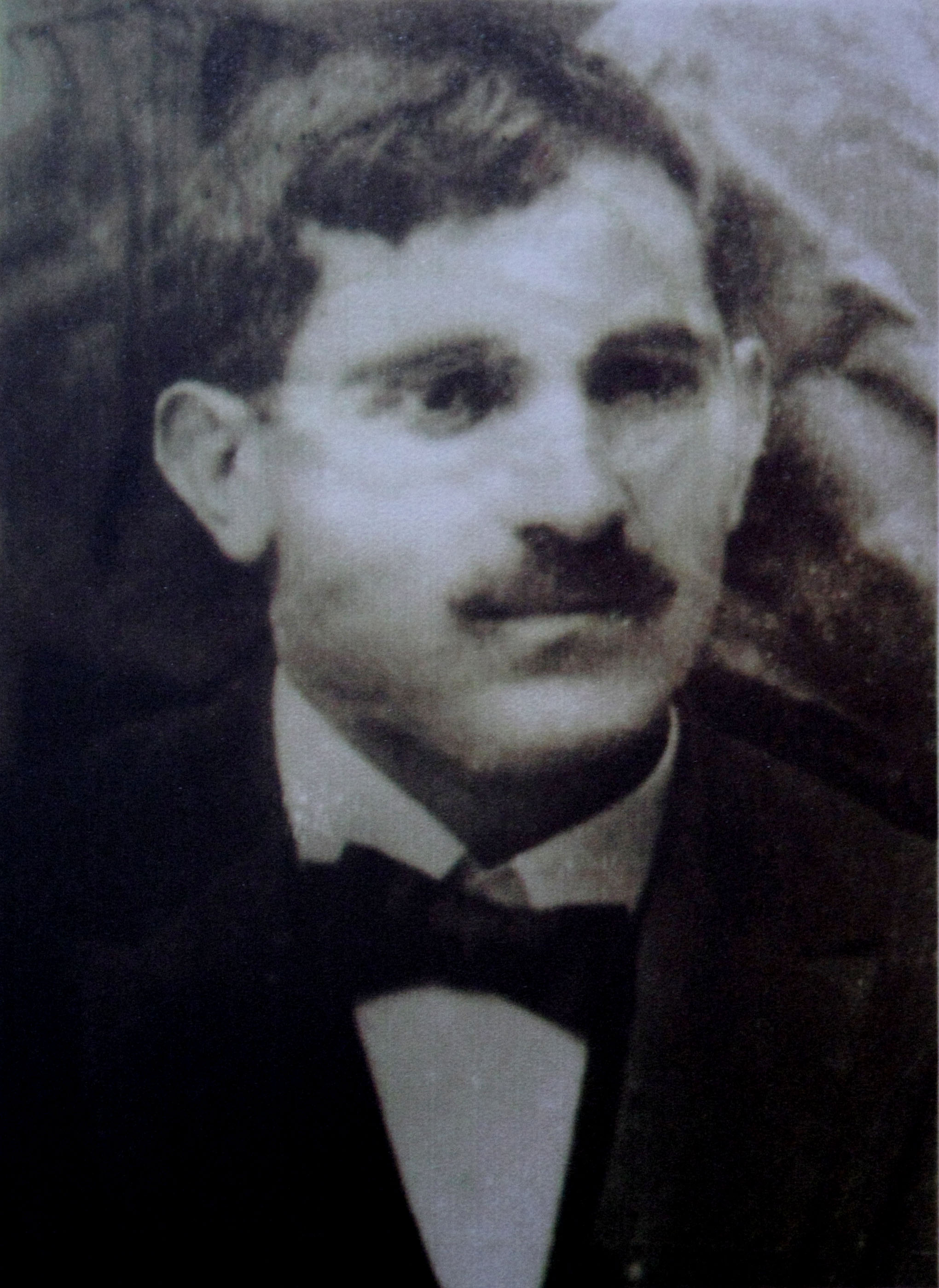

Minister of Food

Minister of Social Protection of the First Republic of Armenia
- In office February 7, 1919 – June 24, 1919
- Prime Minister: Hovhannes Kajaznuni Alexander Khatisyan
- Preceded by: Christophor Vermishev
- Succeeded by: Hovhannes Ter-Mikaelyan

Mayor of Yerevan

Personal details
- Born: 1885 village of Parbi, Ashtarak region, Armenia
- Died: October 8, 1940 Yerevan prison

Sahak David Torosyan (Armenian: Սահակ Թորոսյան, 1885 - October 8, 1940) was an Armenian politician

== Biography ==
Torosyan was born in the village of Parbi in Ashtarak region, in Armenia in 1885.

He studied at elementary school in Ashtarak, then entered the Echmiadzin Seminary. In 1907, he was appointed a senior lecturer at Oshakan parish school. Torosyan has been a member of the ARF (Armenian Revolutionary Federation) since 1907. In 1909, at the suggestion of the ARF Authorities, he moved to Tbilisi to work as a correspondent for the newspaper “Horizon”. Meanwhile, he gave lectures at Gayanian female school. In 1912, he became the leader of the ARF Bureau in Etchmiadzin. Torosyan was invited to Yerevan as a teacher of Armenian History and Literature at Diocesan and Gayanian schools. In 1914, he was elected a member of the ARF Central Committee of Tbilisi. During his stay in Tbilisi and Etchmiadzin he used to do translations and engaged in fiction writing. In 1917, Sahak Torosyan was appointed Mayor of Yerevan and a member at both the first and the second Parliaments of the first Republic of Armenia. In 1918, being a member of Parliament, Torosyan assigned the role of the Deputy Minister of Internal Affairs. On February 7, 1919 he was appointed the Minister of Public Assistance (On April 8, 1918 the latter was renamed the Ministry of Labor and Public Assistance) and occupied the position till June 24 of the same year. Later, he held the position of the Minister of Food, but after the Bolshevik Revolution in May, came to substitute for the Minister of Internal Affairs, as well as assigned the post of the Governor of Ararat region. During the entire period of the first Republic of Armenia, he was a member of Parliament, and a representative of the ARF Faction. After the collapse of the first Republic of Armenia, Torosyan again started teaching. Since March 1920, Torosyan has been the leader of the ARF at the National Assembly, and starting from May the Deputy Minister of Internal Affairs. He was arrested for 3 times during the Soviet years. In 1937, after returning from the last exile, the ARF member was again arrested. In 1938, he was sentenced to death by firing squad. Yet, the execution was then postponed. He died of small cell lung carcinoma in Yerevan prison on October 8, 1940.
