= Avetik Sahakyan =

Armenian politician

Avetik Sahakian
- Աւետիք Սահակեան
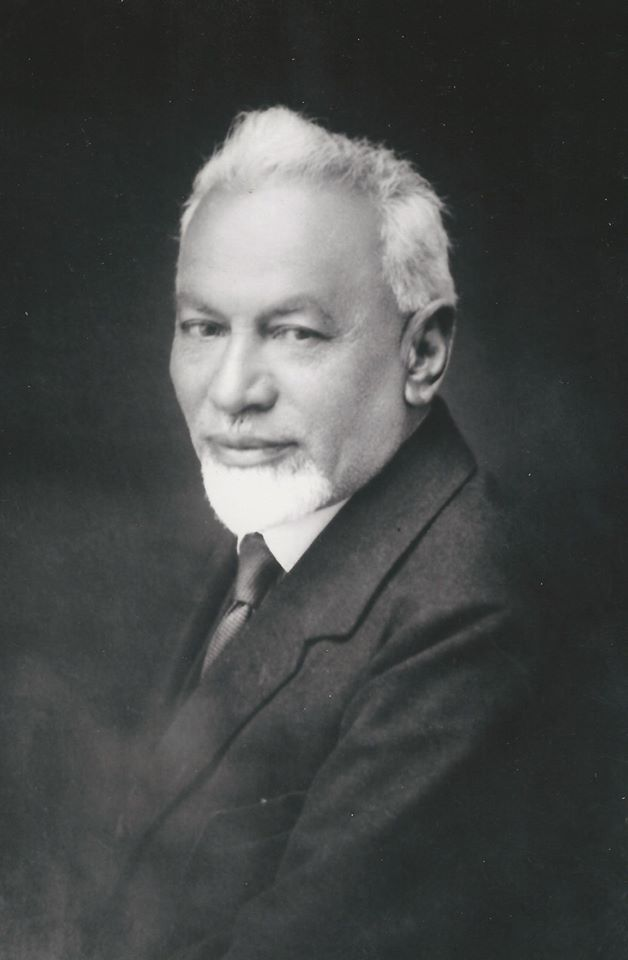

Chairman of the Parliament of Armenia
- In office 1 August 1918 – 1 August 1919
- Preceded by: Serop Zakaryan
- Succeeded by: Avetis Aharonian

Minister of Welfare (Public Assistance) and Labour of Armenia
- In office 10 August 1919 – 31 October 1920
- Preceded by: Hovhannes Ter-Mikaelyan
- Succeeded by: Artashes Babalian

Personal details
- Born: 1863 Jalal-oghli, Tiflis Governorate, Russian Empire (present-day Stepanavan, Armenia)
- Died: 1933 (aged 69–70) Lebanon
- Party: Armenian Revolutionary Federation

Avetik Hovhannesi Sahakian (Armenian: Աւետիք Սահակեան; 1863–1933), also known as Father Abraham, was an Armenian politician, the Parliamentary President (speaker) of the First Republic of Armenia in 1918–19, the social security minister and member of ARF Dashnaktsutiun Eastern Bureau. He was also known as agricultural scientist.

== Biography ==
Sahakian was born in Jalaloghly, Tiflis Governorate (present-day Stepanavan, Armenia). He was included in Western Armenian liberation activities (since 1898) and ARF Caucasian project. He married Varvara Sahakyan, who became one of the first three women elected to parliament in Armenia in 1919. He became Chairman of Parliament in 1918.

Hovannisian describes Avetik Sahakian in The Republic of Armenia, Vol. II:

Avetik Sahakian, affectionately called “Father Abraham” in party circles, was at fifty-four the dean of the cabinet. A native of Jalal-oghli and a graduate of the Petrovsk Agricultural Academy in Moscow, he had been employed in municipal and technical agencies in the Caucasus and had earned distinction for his work on control of the boll weevil. He had been a member of the Dashnaktsutiun Bureau and several national bodies before the 1917 revolutions, then served as provisions minister in the Transcaucasian Federation, and, after moving to Erevan with many comrades in the summer of 1918, became a mainstay in the Khorhurd during the first trying months of Armenian independence.

Following the Bolshevik takeover of Armenia in 1920, Sahakyan was imprisoned. Following his release, the couple and their children fled on foot to Tabriz in Persia, before settling in Iraq. However, the climate affected Varvara's health, and the family relocated to Beirut. He died in 1933.

== Books ==
- Nersisian, Ashot. Aprogh herosner: Avetik Sahakian, Yerevan, 2004 (in Armenian)
