= Simon Vratsian =

Armenian politician; Prime Minister of Armenia

- Սիմոն Վրացեան
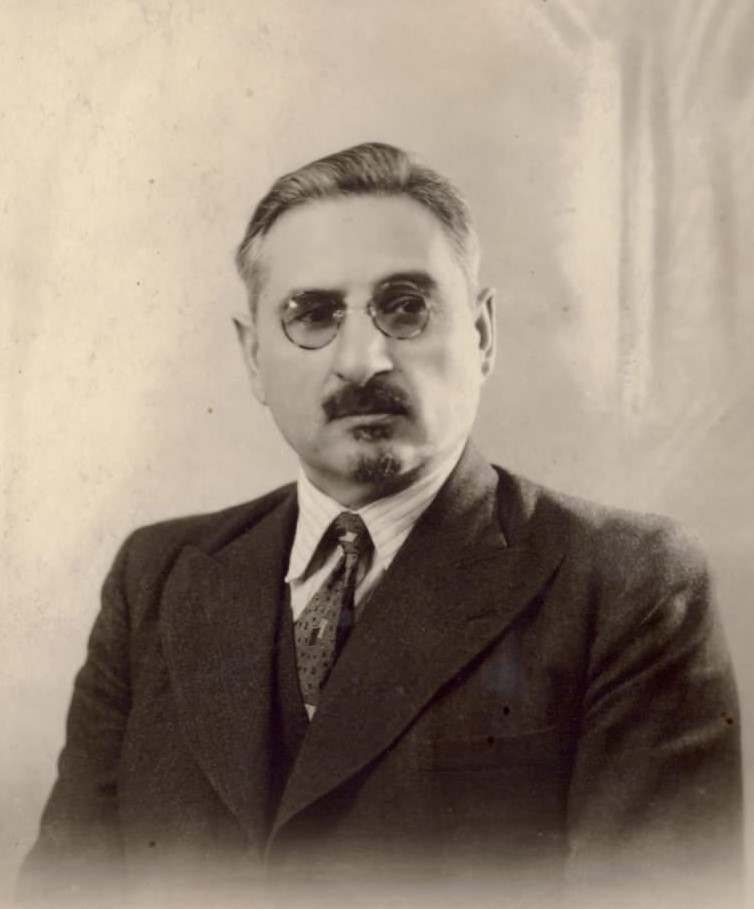
- Vratsian in 1920

4th Prime Minister of Armenia
- In office 23 November 1920 – 2 December 1920
- Preceded by: Hamo Ohanjanyan
- Succeeded by: position abolished

Minister of Foreign Affairs of Armenia
- In office 23 November 1920 – 2 December 1920
- Preceded by: Hamo Ohanjanyan
- Succeeded by: position abolished Alexander Bekzadyan (as People's Commissar of Foreign Affairs of Soviet Armenia)

Minister of Agriculture and State Property of Armenia
- In office 3 April 1920 – 23 November 1920
- Preceded by: position established
- Succeeded by: Arshak Hovhannisyan

Minister of Labour of Armenia
- In office 3 April 1920 – 23 November 1920
- Preceded by: position established
- Succeeded by: Arshak Hovhannisyan

Personal details
- Born: 5 April [O.S. 24 March] 1882 Metz Sala, Nor Nakhichevan (today Nakhichevan-on-Don), Russian Empire
- Died: 21 May 1969 (aged 87) Beirut, Lebanon
- Party: Armenian Revolutionary Federation
- Spouse: Yelena Shigaeva

Simon Vratsian (Armenian: Սիմոն Վրացեան; 5 April [O.S. 24 March] 1882 – 21 May 1969) was an Armenian politician and activist of the Armenian Revolutionary Federation. He was one of the leaders of the First Republic of Armenia (1918–1920) and served as its last prime minister for 10 days in 1920. He also headed the Committee for the Salvation of the Fatherland for 40 days during the anti-Bolshevik February Uprising in 1921. While in exile, he continued his political and educational activities in the Armenian diaspora and wrote several books, most notably his six-volume memoir Keankʻi ughinerov ("On the Path of Life") and his history of the First Republic of Armenia titled Hayastani Hanrapetutʻiwn ("The Republic of Armenia").

== Biography ==
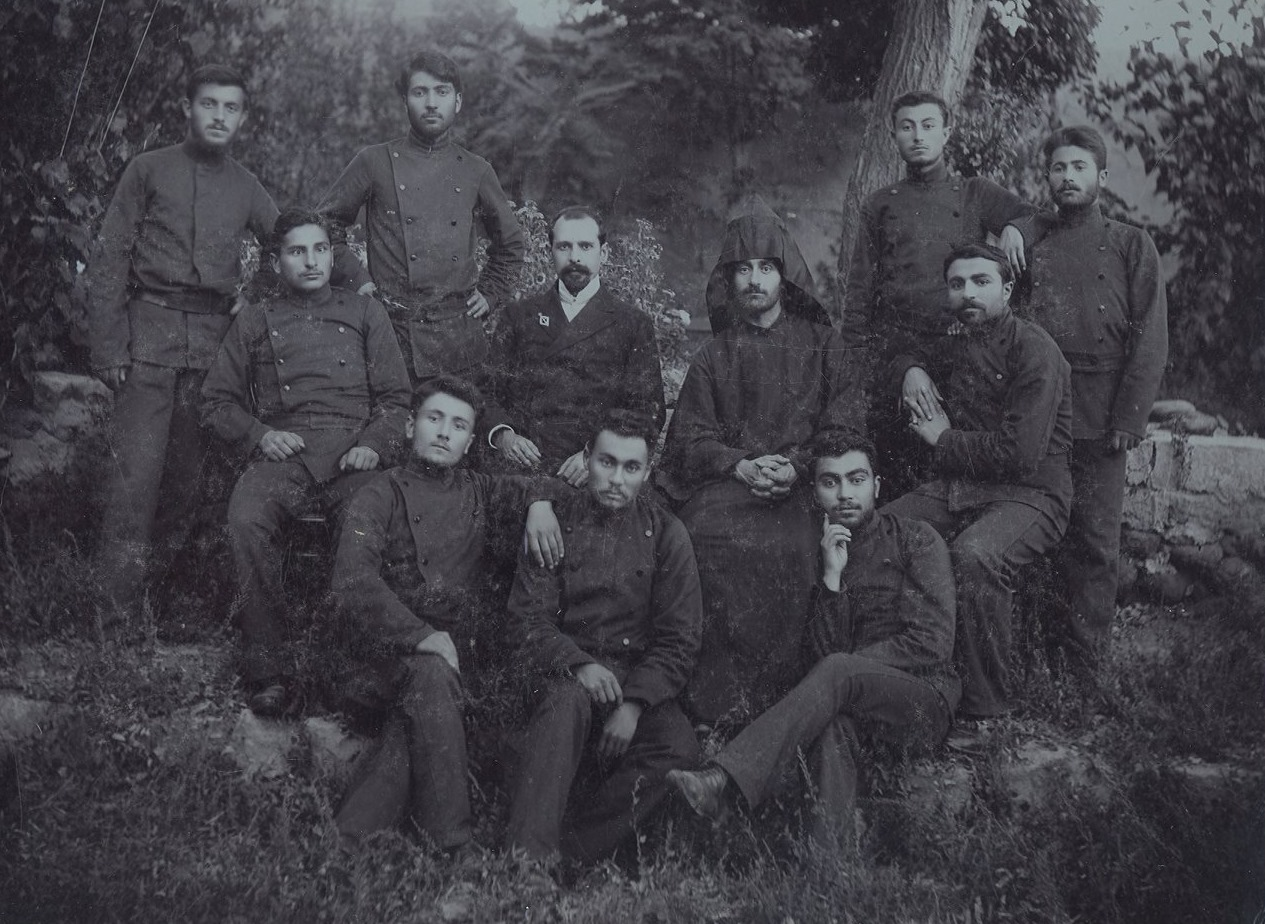
Simon Vratsian (left, seated second row) in 1904 at the Gevorgian Seminary with fellow students and Komitas

Vratsian was born Simavon Grouzian in the village of Metz Sala (Bolshiye Saly) near Nor Nakhichevan in the Russian Empire (now Nakhichevan-on-Don) on 5 April 1882 (March 24 by the Julian calendar). When he was five years old, his family settled among Cossacks in the Kuban region, although they soon returned to Metz Sala at the insistence of Vratsian's mother, who wanted her children to receive an Armenian education. After education at Armenian and Russian schools, he joined the Armenian Revolutionary Federation (ARF, also known as Dashnaktsutiun or the Dashnak party) in 1898, apparently by mistake while trying to join the rival Hunchak Party, which was holding a meeting in the same building. He received further education at the Gevorgian Seminary in Echmiadzin from 1900 to 1906. Vratsian returned to Nor Nakhichevan as an ARF operative and took part in the 4th General Congress of the Dashnaktsutiun at Vienna in 1907, where he supported the adoption of socialism in the party program.

In 1908, he traveled to Saint Petersburg to study law and education. He earned his teaching credentials but was instructed to flee Russia before completing his law degree due to increased repression of ARF members by the Tsarist authorities. He went first to Constantinople and then to Erzurum, where he was invited to train Armenian teachers at the Sanasarian Academy and teach history at a secondary school for girls. He then travelled to the United States in 1911 where he edited the Hairenik newspaper in Boston.

In 1914, he traveled to Erzurum in the Ottoman Empire to attend the 8th General Congress of the Dashnaktsutiun as the representative of the party organization in America. He was elected to the party's Bureau (its top executive body) and mixed with the leaders of the Young Turks. In August 1914 he was jailed as a Russian spy but escaped to Transcaucasia, where he became involved with the Armenian volunteer units which fought with the Russian army. After the disbandment of the units, he attended the Moscow state conference, the Armenian National Congress, and was elected a member of the National Council. Hovhannes Katchaznouni asked him to accompany him on his tour of Europe and America in 1919, but he was refused a visa by the British as they saw him as a radical socialist. In the same year he was appointed to the Minister of Labour, Agriculture and State positions in Alexander Khatisian's Cabinet. His positions carried over to the government of Hamo Ohanjanyan; he also assumed responsibilities for information and propaganda. After the resignation of the government and the failure of Hovhannes Katchaznouni to form a coalition, Vratsian accepted post of prime minister on 23 November 1920.

On 2 December he surrendered Armenia to the Bolsheviks. He subsequently went into hiding, and later emerged in February 1921 as the chairman of the Committee for the Salvation of the Fatherland, which led the anti-Bolshevik February Uprising that briefly overthrew Soviet rule in Armenia. In April, after the anti-Bolshevik rebels were forced to retreat south to the mountainous region of Zangezur, Vratsian became premier of the Republic of Mountainous Armenia. However, this republic only lasted around 40 days; in July he escaped to Persia with his bodyguards and aides, leaving his wife and child with American Near East Relief worker Dr. Clarence Ussher. He also appealed to Europe and Turkey for assistance against the Bolsheviks. Vratsian then travelled over Europe, settling in Paris to edit the ARF's official newspaper Droshak from 1924 to 1933. In 1939, he returned to the United States and remained there for twelve years due to the outbreak of World War II. In 1945 he presented a petition to the UN General Assembly at San Francisco demanding the restoration of Wilsonian Armenia held by Turkey to Armenia.

During his lifetime he edited various now defunct Armenian periodicals and newspapers, including Harach and Horizon. He also traveled extensively, appealing to various European powers to help Armenia regain its independence. He finally settled in Beirut, Lebanon in 1952, where he was principal of and taught courses at the Collège Arménien (Nshan Palandjian Jemaran), one of the main schools of the Armenian diaspora. Among his former students are the prominent Armenian historians Richard G. Hovannisian and Gerard Libaridian. He died in Beirut aged 87 on 21 May 1969.

== Personal details ==
In his memoirs, Vratsian explains that his original surname, Grouzian, came from the Armenian word "grouz" (գռուզ), which means curly or frizzled. This was because many people from his extended family had curly hair. His surname was changed by a schoolteacher, Melikian, who incorrectly assumed that Grouzian was a corruption of Gruzinian (from Russian gruzin, meaning Georgian), and thus Armenianized it to Vratsian (from the Armenian word for Georgian). Vratsian describes that after the incident with Melikian, his family was divided into three camps: the Grouzian camp, which included his mother, who thought he was a traitor, and his conservative uncle Garabed; the Grouzinian camp, which consists of his "lover of all new things" (as described by Vratsian) uncle Mergian; and the Vratsian camp, of which Simon was the only member. He also mentions in his memoirs that his grandmother died aged 116, but that it cannot be proven since most countries didn't start recording dates of birth until the year 1900.

He describes his father as a storyteller, whose stories increased business for the family coffee shop. He also writes in his memoirs (Keankʻi ughinerov) about his rich maternal uncle Mikishka, and estimates that his net worth in several millions of dollars. Vratsian recounts how his "cheap" and "stingy" maternal uncle Mikishka gave him the equivalent of 20 modern US cents for a 2,000 kilometer journey. He also recalls how later, when he was getting involved in Armenian political parties, he was going to be a member of the Social-Democrat Hnchakian Party. However, he and his friend accidentally walked into a Dashnak meeting, themselves becoming Dashnaks. He also describes the ARF General Congresses in minute detail, such as which member of the congress wanted an alliance with Russia, who wanted to fund the curing of Armenian villagers from lice, which hotel he stayed in, and who he became friends with. He describes his friendship with prominent figures of the Armenian national movement such as Rostom, Hamazasp, Andranik, Armen Garo, Aram Manukian, among others. For example, in the second volume of his memoir Keankʻi ughinerov, he recounts that he was a teacher of Armenian history for one year. One of his students who always disrupted class was Andranik's daughter. Vratsian hit Andranik's daughter, and was summoned to the Headmaster's office. There he met Andranik, and when Vratsian explained why he had hit his daughter, Andranik thanked Vratsian for disciplining her. Vratsian was also a close friend of Drastamat Kanayan (Dro), with whom he lived in Beirut for several years; Vratsian wrote a book about Dro's life titled Mrrkatsin Dron ("Tempest-born Dro").

In Vratsian's memoirs, there are no accounts of his wife or any children. Oliver Baldwin's "Six Prisons and Two Revolutions" gives us the only piece of evidence about his direct family. Baldwin was an Englishman who became a Lieutenant-Colonel in the Armenian Army. He was at the house of Dr. Clarence Ussher (from the Near East Relief) when a messenger from Vratsian arrived asking Dr. Ussher to keep his wife and son safe when the Bolsheviks took over. However, according to Baldwin, Vratsian's son "died of exposure" while they were fleeing to Persia in the aftermath of the February Uprising. There is no other mention of Vratsian's wife and son.

Political offices
| Preceded by Hamo Ohanjanyan | Prime Minister of the First Republic of Armenia; 1920 | Succeeded by Soviet control of Armenia |
