= Artashes Babalian =

Armenian politician

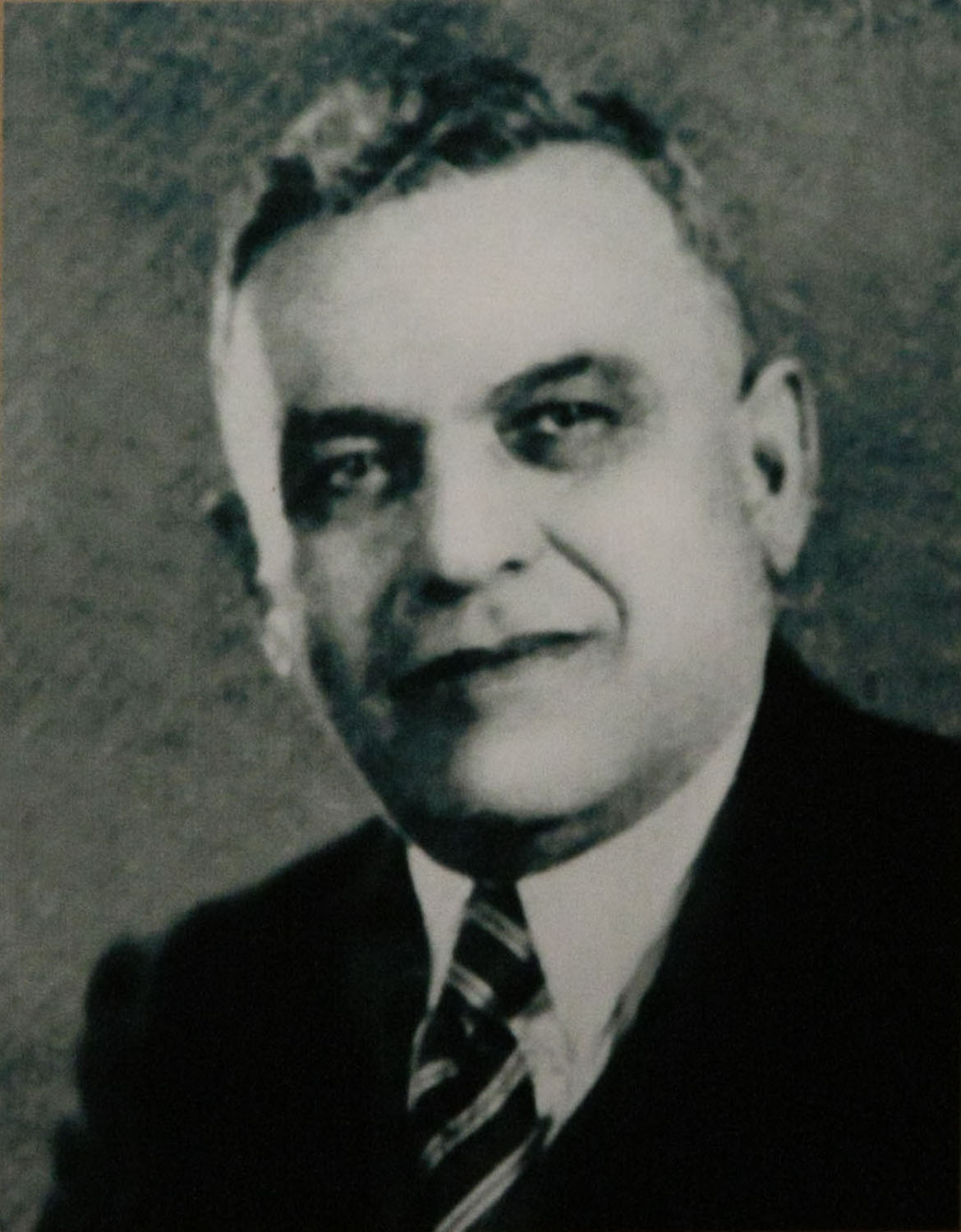

Minister of Social Protection of the First Republic of Armenia
- In office October 31, 1919 – May 5, 1920
- Preceded by: Avetik Sahakyan
- Succeeded by: Sargis Araratyan

Personal details
- Born: November 17, 1886 Shusha, Russian Empire
- Died: August 1, 1959 (aged 72) Tehran, Iran
- Occupation: politician
- Profession: doctor

Artashes Babalian (Armenian: Արտաշես Բաբալյան; November 17, 1886 – August 1, 1959) was an Armenian doctor, politician and public figure who served as the minister of social protection in the government of the First Republic of Armenia. Babalian was born in 1886 in Shushi, Karabakh. Babalian was also a member of the Armenian Revolutionary Federation.
