= Sirakan Tigranyan =

Armenian politician

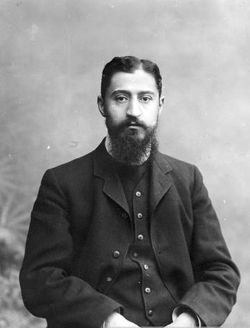

Minister of Foreign Affairs of the First Republic of Armenia
- In office 1918–1919
- Prime Minister: Hovhannes Kajaznuni
- Preceded by: Hovhannes Kajaznuni
- Succeeded by: Alexander Khatisian

Personal details
- Born: 1875 Alexandrapol (Gyumri now), Armenia
- Died: 1937 (aged 61–62)
- Party: Armenian Revolutionary Federation

Sirakan Tadevosi Tigranyan (Armenian: Սիրական Թադևոսի Տիգրանյան; 1875–1937) was an Armenian politician who served as Minister of Foreign Affairs of the First Republic of Armenia from 1918 to 1919.

In a letter to his wife, the first prime minister of Armenia, Hovhannes Kajaznuni, described Tigranyan as "quite trained, able to judge, but at the same time he has an abstract, fruitless and unsophisticated mind."
