= Sargis Araratyan =

Armenian politician

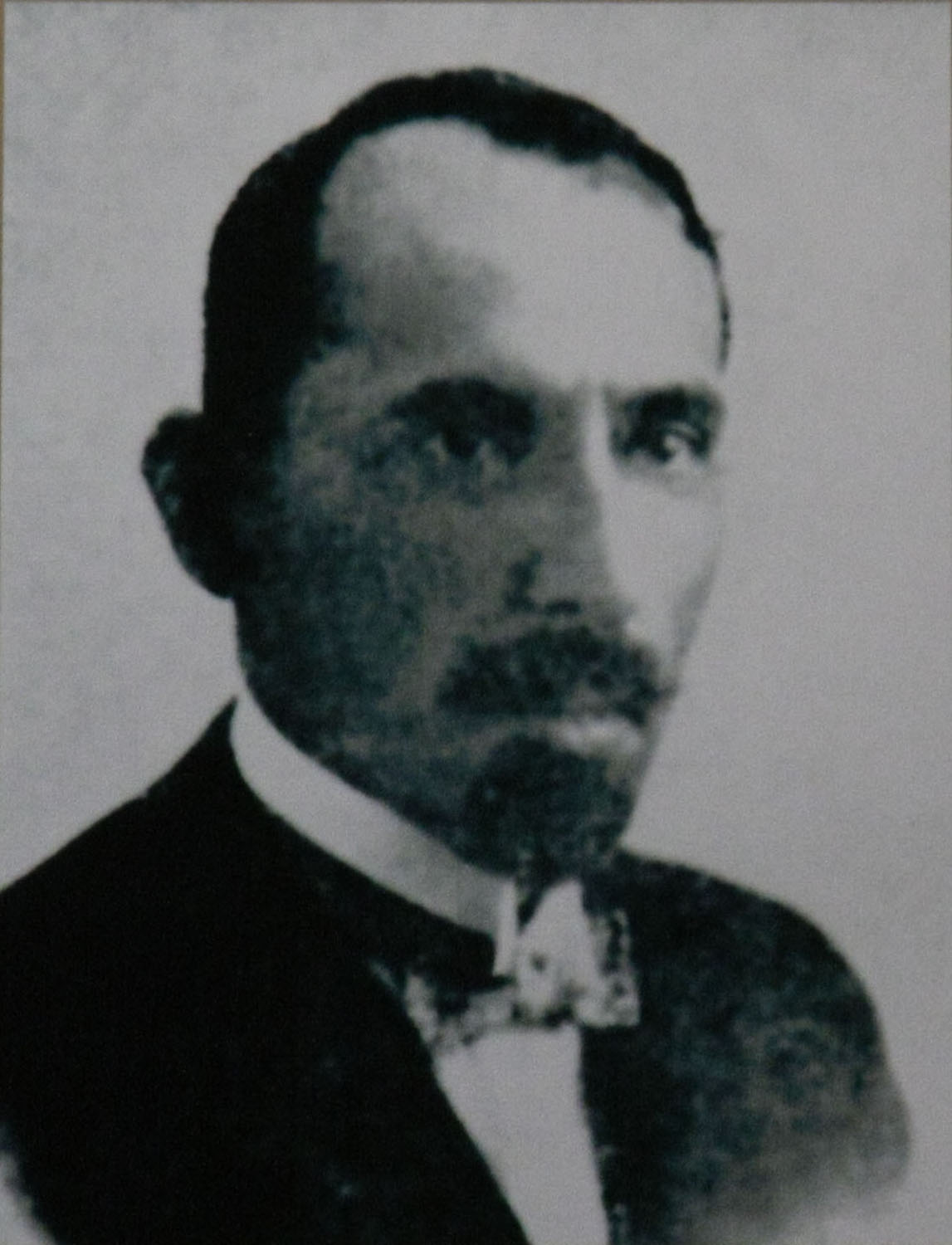

Minister of Social Protection of the First Republic of Armenia
- In office May 5, 1920 – November 25, 1920
- Preceded by: Artashes Babalian
- Succeeded by: Hambardzum Terteryan

Minister of Finance
- In office August 10, 1919 – May 5, 1920
- Preceded by: Grigor Jaghetyan
- Succeeded by: Artashes Enfiajyan

Personal details
- Born: Sargis Shahnazarian; 1886 Nukha Uyezd, Elisabethpol Governorate, Russian Empire
- Died: 1943 (aged 56–57)
- Party: Armenian Revolutionary Federation

Sargis Shahnazar Araratyan (Armenian: Սարգիս Արարատյան; 1886–1943) was an Armenian politician who served as Minister of Finance of the First Republic of Armenia from 1919 to 1920 and Minister of Social Protection in 1920.

Sargis Araratyan was a chemist by profession, as well as a public figure, a statesman and a prominent politician, a member of the ARF (Armenian Revolutionary Federation). He lived in Baku and took an active role in the Armenian National life.

Hovannisian describes Sargis Araratian in The Republic of Armenia, Vol. II:

... like other Dashnakist intellectuals, [Araratian] served as teacher, editor, and field-worker. Regarded as an incisive thinker, he was often consulted by highly placed comrades. At the time of the Persian revolution in 1906 he was teaching at Tabriz, where he was closely associated with the Persian Armenian revolutionary leader Eprem Khan. He later earned a doctorate in chemistry at the University of Geneva, while collaborating with Mikayel Varandian in the management of Droshak (“Banner”), central organ of the Armenian Revolutionary Federation. After his return to the Caucasus, Araratian was first attached to one of the Armenian volunteer regiments as a propagandist and then participated in the defense of Baku in 1918. Now, at thirty-three years of age, he took on the tremendous problems of finance and provisions in the Republic of Armenia.

In 1918, he was elected a member of Baku City Council and sent to Persia for negotiations on the future of Baku.

In late 1918, after Armenia gained independence he moved to Yerevan. From 1919 to 1920, Araratyan was elected a member of the ARF Bureau, and a member of Parliament. He held the post of the Minister of Finance and also the Minister of Provisions (08.1919-05.1920). In the period of 05.1920-12.1920 he was the Minister of Assistance and Reconstruction. He left Yerevan in 1920, lived in Bucharest, Romania.
