= Levon Ghulyan =

Minister of Provisions of the First Republic of Armenia
- In office 4 November 1918 – spring 1919
- Prime Minister: Hovhannes Katchaznouni
- Preceded by: Position created
- Succeeded by: Christophor Vermishev

Levon Ghulyan (Armenian: Լևոն Ղուլյան) was an Armenian politician who served as Minister of Provisions of the First Republic of Armenia from 1918 to 1919.

In a letter to his wife, the first prime minister of Armenia, Hovhannes Kajaznuni, described Ghulyan as "practically intelligent, very resourceful and capable person, but unreliable", adding: "he pretends to be a strong Armenian, but really he has only one God, his own interest."
