= Alexander Khatisian =

Armenian politician

- Ալեքսանդր Խատիսեան
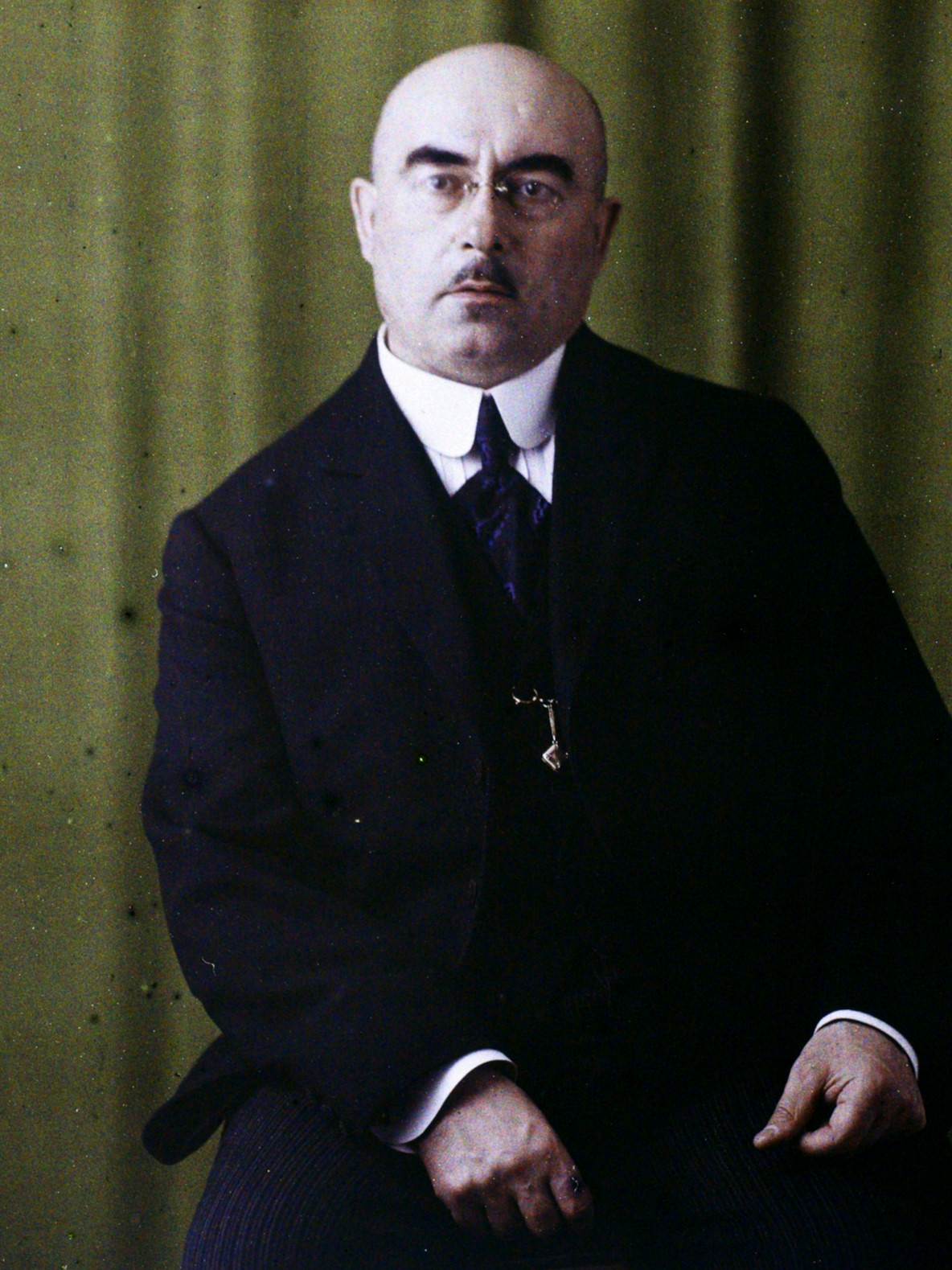
- Autochrome portrait by Auguste Léon, 1921

Minister of Foreign Affairs
- In office 30 June 1918 – 4 November 1918
- Preceded by: position established
- Succeeded by: Sirakan Tigranyan
- In office 27 April 1919 – 5 May 1920
- Preceded by: Sirakan Tigranyan
- Succeeded by: Hamo Ohanjanyan

2nd Prime Minister of Armenia
- In office 28 May 1919 – 5 May 1920
- Preceded by: Hovhannes Kajaznuni
- Succeeded by: Hamo Ohanjanyan

Minister of Internal Affairs
- In office 26 January 1919 – 27 April 1919
- Preceded by: Aram Manukian
- Succeeded by: Sargis Manasian

Minister of Welfare
- In office 13 December 1918 – 7 February 1919
- Preceded by: Aram Manukian
- Succeeded by: Sahak Torosyan

Mayor of Tiflis
- In office 1910–1917
- Preceded by: Vasiliy Cherkezov
- Succeeded by: Benia Chkhikvishvili

Mayor of Alexandropol
- In office 1917–1917

Personal details
- Born: 17 February 1874 Tiflis, Tiflis Governorate, Russian Empire
- Died: 10 March 1945 (aged 71) Paris, France
- Party: Armenian Revolutionary Federation

Alexander Khatisian (Armenian: Ալեքսանդր Խատիսեան; 17 February 1874 – 10 March 1945) was an Armenian politician, doctor and journalist.

== Biography ==
In a letter to his wife, the first prime minister of Armenia, Hovhannes Kajaznuni, described Khatisian as a person with "inexhaustible energy and a strange ability to work". Adding that "he has entrepreneurship (initiative), strong nerves, he understands issues quickly, he has a lot of administrative experience. able to adapt and find the middle line … he is the most valued member of my cabinet today, unfortunately he has no moral authority, does not inspire faith and confidence in his personality, and this greatly hinders the work."

Khatisian was born in Tiflis in the Tiflis Governorate of the Russian Empire (Tbilisi, Georgia) to a prominent Armenian family of noble origins. He first studied at a state school in Tiflis, then received his training as a doctor at universities in Moscow, Kharkov and Germany.

He served as the mayor of Tiflis from 1910 to 1917. During this period Count Illarion Ivanovich Vorontsov-Dashkov consulted with him, Primate of Tiflis Bishop Mesrop Der-Movsesian, and prominent civic leader Dr. Hakob Zavriev about the creation of Armenian volunteer detachments in the summer of 1914, which Khatisian enthusiastically supported and organized. In 1917, Khatisian became a member of the Armenian Revolutionary Federation.

In the lead up to the establishment First Republic of Armenia, he served as a member from the Armenian National Council of Tiflis to the Armenian National Council and later to the permanent executive committee selected by Armenian Congress of Eastern Armenians. After declaration of the First Republic of Armenia, he served as foreign minister and signed the Treaty of Batum with the Ottoman Empire. He served as interior minister January–April 1920 following the death of Aram Manukian, then served as prime minister from May 1919 to May 1920, resigning in the aftermath of the Bolshevik-led May Uprising. After his resignation, he sought aid for the Republic of Armenia in various European capitals. On December 3, 1920, an Armenian delegation led by Khatisian signed the Treaty of Alexandropol with Kemalist Turkey, though the government it represented no longer existed (power had already been transferred to the new Soviet authorities), making the treaty illegal.

Following the Soviet takeover of Armenia, Khatisian went into exile in Paris, France. He wrote his memoirs titled Kʻaghakʻapeti mě hishataknerě ("The Memoirs of a Mayor") and Hayastani Hanrapetutʻian tsagumn u zargatsʻumě ("History and Development of the Republic of Armenia", 1930, revised edition 1968). He was arrested following the liberation of Paris from Nazi occupation on suspicion of collaborating with the Germans, but was soon released.

He died in Paris on 10 March 1945 at the age of 71.

Political offices
| Preceded by Hovhannes Katchaznouni | Prime Minister of the First Republic of Armenia; 1919–1920 | Succeeded by Hamo Ohanjanyan |
