= Anna Nellens =

Flemish anarchist (1871–1926)

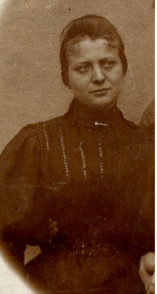
- Anna Nellens in 1896
- Born: 1871
- Died: 1926
- Occupations: Anarchist, revolutionary, dressmaker, bookseller
- Spouse: Edward Joris

Anna Nellens (1871–1926), also known by her nom de guerre Bella, was a Flemish anarchist and activist for the Armenian cause.

Together with her husband, Edward Joris, she joined the Armenian Revolutionary Federation (ARF) in its plot to assassinate Sultan Abdul Hamid II, the main figure responsible for the Hamidian massacres, which claimed the lives of 100,000 to 300,000 Armenians. After participating in organizing the Abdul Hamid II assassination attempt in Yıldız, she managed to escape from the Ottoman Empire.

Nellens later settled in Geneva, where she was rejected by the city's Armenian community and lived in significant poverty until the ARF provided financial support, allowing her to open a boarding house. Following Edward Joris's release in 1907, she returned to Antwerp, where the couple purchased and managed a bookstore until Joris went into exile in the Netherlands. Nellens then took over the management of the bookstore until her death in 1926.

== Biography ==
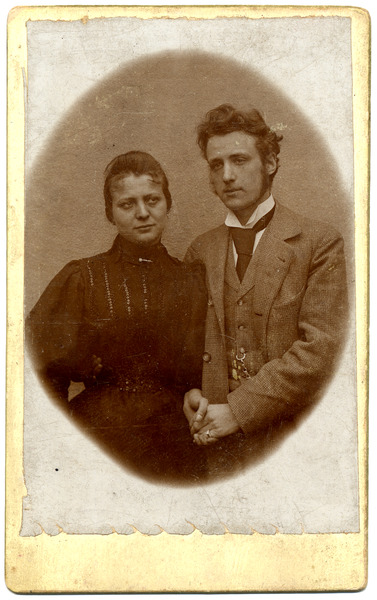
Photograph of Anna Nellens and Edward Joris (1896) (collections of the Letterenhuis)

Anna Nellens was born in 1871. She initially lived in Antwerp and worked as a seamstress and dressmaker. Nellens joined Edward Joris, another Belgian anarchist, in Constantinople in May 1902, and the two married there on 26 July 1902. Joris had some reluctances about the marriage but ultimately committed to the relationship.

In 1904, she moved with Joris, their housemaid Steliani, and their dog, Tot, to a house in the Tozkoparan neighborhood. Between 1904 and 1905, Nellens and her husband became involved in the Armenian Revolutionary Federation's (ARF) attempt to assassinate Sultan Abdul Hamid II as retribution for the Hamidian massacres, which resulted in the deaths of between 100,000 and 300,000 Armenians. The recruitment of Nellens and Joris was of strategic interest to the ARF, as they believed anarchists would be sympathetic to their cause. Additionally, the Belgian nationality—Belgium being a neutral country—was another factor motivating the ARF's choice.

The ARF gave Nellens the pseudonyms "Adèle Berchier" and "Bella". She became actively involved in organizing the conspiracy, visiting the mosque where the Sultan would be targeted to conduct reconnaissance. Nellens and "Emille" (Marie Seitz) carried out the final reconnaissance mission together.

Since she was not part of the final team—composed of Sophie Areshian, Martiros Margarian, Marie Seitz, and the driver of the explosive-laden cart, Zareh—she left Constantinople the day before the attack, on 20 July 1905. Carrying 240 francs, she traveled to Plovdiv, where the local ARF leader was tasked with hiding her and finding her work if necessary. The next day, the Abdul Hamid II assassination attempt in Yıldız took place while she was already in hiding.

Nellens was sentenced to death in absentia for her role in the plot but managed to escape, eventually resurfacing in Geneva, Switzerland. However, she was poorly received by the Armenian community there, which feared that the presence of a controversial and wanted figure could harm them. The lack of support from the ARF was criticized by her anarchist comrades, such as Victor Resseler, who expressed his disapproval to Georges Lorand, one of the leaders of the "Jorisards" movement:

In spite of her efforts, she could not find employment… Her friends pretend not to be able to pay for her boarding house expenses after the New Year [1906]. So she is now alone and penniless. Her clothes are in trunks that remained in Plovdiv so she is still wearing her summer clothes. It seems that Armenians in Geneva would like her to leave, feeling that her presence might put them in jeopardy.

The ARF defended itself against such accusations, claiming that it had always provided financial assistance to Nellens and that its publication Droshak in Antwerp maintained close contact with the committees supporting Joris's release. In reality, the lack of support for the Joris-Nellens couple stemmed from several factors, including internal leadership conflicts within the ARF following the death of Christapor Mikaelian during the bombing project, and the organization’s shift of focus toward the Caucasus in response to Tsarist repression and the Armenian-Tatar massacres. Nonetheless, the ARF financed Nellens to help her open a boarding house in Geneva.

After Joris's release—who received a pardon by the Sultan due to intense diplomatic and revolutionary pressure—Nellens joined him in Antwerp. She abandoned her false identity, resumed her life in Belgium, and was not troubled by Belgian authorities, despite not having received a pardon from the Ottoman Sultan herself.

In 1910, the couple purchased the Kersouwken bookstore in Antwerp, located on Saint James market square. When Joris was exiled to Amsterdam after World War I, Nellens managed the bookstore alone until her death.

She died in 1926.

== Bibliography ==
- Alloul, Houssine (2018). To Kill a Sultan: A Transnational History of the Attempt on Abdülhamid II. Palgrave Macmillan. ISBN 978-1-137-48931-9.
- Simons, Ludo (1987). Geschiedenis van de uitgeverij in Vlaanderen (2). Lannoo. ISBN 9789020913903.
