= Marie Seitz =

- Occupation: Revolutionary

Marie Seitz (19th century–20th century), also known by her nom de guerre, Emille, was a German revolutionary and activist for the Armenian cause. She is best known for her involvement in Operation Nejuik, organized by the Armenian Revolutionary Federation (ARF), which aimed to assassinate Sultan Abdul Hamid II, the primary instigator of the Hamidian massacres that resulted in the deaths of 100,000 to 300,000 Armenians.

She participated in both the planning of the plot and the final commando operation, culminating in the Abdul Hamid II assassination attempt in Yıldız. She managed to escape from the Ottoman Empire and disappear.

== Biography ==
Marie Seitz was born in the Russian Empire, although she was of German origin. In 1904, she joined the Armenian Revolutionary Federation's (ARF) attempt to assassinate Sultan Abdul Hamid II in retaliation for the Hamidian massacres, for which he was the main orchestrator, causing the deaths of between 100,000 and 300,000 Armenians. In addition to Seitz, the group included Belgian anarchists Edward Joris and his wife, Anna Nellens, who joined the effort due to ideological alignment, as well as Christapor Mikaelian, one of the ARF's founders, Sophie Areshian, and Martiros Margarian, Armenian revolutionaries.

Before involving her more deeply in the project, the organizers held a meeting to discuss whether women should be included in the assassination attempt or "spared" from such tasks. However, they decided it was inappropriate to debate this issue without consulting the women themselves. On 4 December 1904, 'Rubina' (Sophie Areshian), 'Emille' (Seitz), and 'Michelle' joined the discussions and declared their full willingness to participate in the project. They expressed offense at the very question and stated that, if necessary, they would carry out the operation on their own. The inclusion of women in such a significant role within an organization like the ARF was not surprising, given the prominent presence of women in leftist revolutionary movements of the era.

Seitz adopted the pseudonyms "Emille" and "Sophie Rips," posing as the wife of Margarian, who went by the alias "Liba Rips". After the deaths of Mikaelian and Kendirian, another co-conspirator in Bulgaria, while they were preparing explosives for the project, she reunited with Edward Joris, who was deeply affected by the loss of his friend—especially since his passport was left at the scene. However, members of the Internal Macedonian Revolutionary Organization (IMRO) managed to retrieve the passport before the police arrived. Alongside Joris and Margarian, the three revolutionaries spent a night in mourning.

She took part in the final reconnaissance mission before the Abdul Hamid II assassination attempt in Yıldız alongside Anna Nellens. On 21 July 1905, she joined the group's final commando operation, alongside Sophie Areshian, Martiros Margarian, and the bomb-laden cart's driver, Zareh. The group headed toward the mosque under the pretext of fetching a bouquet of flowers for Areshian. They left the mined carriage in front of the mosque, after which Areshian activated the bomb's timer, and the group fled the scene.

After the bombing, she sought refuge with the three other members of the group near Joris's residence, where they could monitor his comings and goings. Joris had informed the group that he would join them so they could coordinate and likely escape together. However, when he arrived, he had lunch without acknowledging them, then left the building again in plain view, giving no indication of recognizing them. As time passed, Seitz and the others decided to wait until six o’clock, the time Joris usually left work and returned home. Their plan to flee Constantinople quickly was already compromised, as the delay caused them to miss the last ferries departing for Piraeus and the Russian Empire. By six o’clock, Joris was still nowhere to be seen—he was, in fact, attending the 75th-anniversary celebration of Belgian independence at a private residence in the city. The group decided to leave around 7:30 p.m., seven hours after the attack. Still posing as Margarian's wife, while Areshian pretended to be Zareh's companion, the four managed to reach the train station and board the last train to Sofia, with the assistance of Turkish police officers who helped load their luggage onto the train. On board, the group was elated. The revolutionaries shook hands and congratulated one another, convinced that Abdul Hamid II was dead and the attack had been a success.

In Sofia, Seitz received the news of the failure of the attack. While the explosion killed 21 people and injured 58 others, Sultan Abdul Hamid II emerged completely unscathed. He had stopped to converse with Mehmet Cemaleddin Efendi inside the mosque, delaying his exit and narrowly avoiding the blast.

== Bibliography ==
- Berberian, Houri (2021). "2 Gendered Narratives of Transgressive Politics: Recovering Revolutionary Rubina". Gendered Narratives of Transgressive Politics: Recovering Revolutionary Rubina. Edinburgh: Edinburgh University Press. pp. 53–82. doi:10.1515/9781474462648-006. ISBN 9781474462648. Archived from the original on 2022-05-19.
- Alloul, Houssine (2018). To Kill a Sultan: A Transnational History of the Attempt on Abdülhamid II. United Kingdom. ISBN 978-1-137-48931-9.
