= Hamo Ohanjanyan =

Armenian politician; Prime Minister of Armenia

- Համօ Օհանջանեան
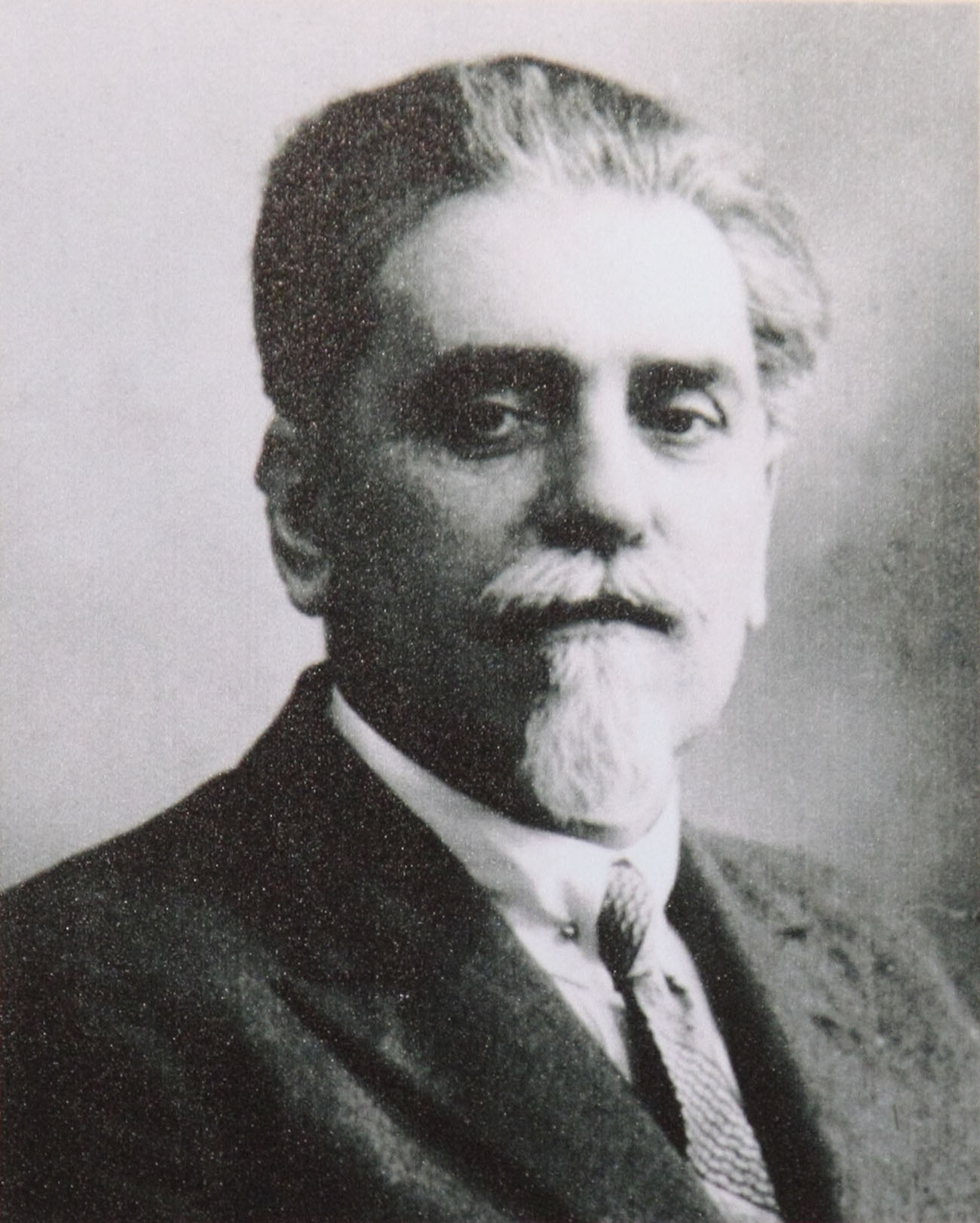

3rd Prime Minister of Armenia
- In office 5 May 1920 – 23 November 1920
- Preceded by: Alexander Khatisian
- Succeeded by: Simon Vratsian

Minister of Foreign Affairs of Armenia
- In office 3 April 1920 – 23 November 1920
- Preceded by: Alexander Khatisian
- Succeeded by: Simon Vratsian

Personal details
- Born: Hamazasp Ohanjanyan; 1873 Akhalkalak, Tiflis Governorate, Russian Empire
- Died: 31 July 1947 (aged 73–74) Cairo, Egypt
- Party: Armenian Revolutionary Federation

Hamazasp "Hamo" Ohanjanyan (Armenian: Համօ Օհանջանեան; (Note: Reformed orthography: Համո Օհանջանյան) 1873 – 31 July 1947) was an Armenian medical doctor, revolutionary, and politician of the Armenian Revolutionary Federation (ARF/Dashnaktsutiun).

He served as the third Prime Minister of the First Republic of Armenia from May 5 to November 23, 1920.

== Biography ==
Hamo Ohanjanyan was born in 1873 in the Armenian-majority town of Akhalkalak (modern-day Akhalkalaki, Georgia) in the Tiflis Governorate of the Russian Empire. He first went to school in his birthplace, then moved to Tiflis (Tbilisi) and graduated from the Tiflis Russian Gymnasium. In 1892 he went to Moscow to continue his studies at the faculty of medicine of Moscow University. However, he was expelled and sent back to Tiflis for participating in revolutionary activities. In 1897, he married Olga Vavilevna, a Russian revolutionary he met in his student days with whom he would have two sons and one daughter. He then traveled to Lausanne, where he graduated from the Lausanne Medical Institute in 1899. It was there that he met Kristapor Mikayelian, one of the founding members of the Armenian Revolutionary Federation. Ohanjanyan's pseudonym within the party was Mher Mherian.

In 1903 he returned to Transcaucasia and worked as a doctor in Tiflis and Baku. He became a member of the eastern Bureau of the ARF in 1905. Ohanjanian was in charge of relations between the ARF and Russian and Georgian revolutionaries during the Armenian–Tatar clashes of 1905–1906. At the 4th congress of the ARF in Vienna in 1907, he was a supporter of the "Caucasian program" which called for the party to engage in revolutionary activities against the tsarist authorities. He was arrested during the tsarist crackdown on Armenian revolutionaries (the so-called "Stolypin reaction") and sent to Novocherkassk in 1909. He was the chief defendant in the trial of 159 ARF members in 1912, where the Armenian revolutionaries were defended by Alexander Kerensky. Ohanjanyan was exiled to Irkutsk Oblast in Siberia the next year. There he met back with Sophie Areshian, a fellow Armenian revolutionary, whom he married and with whom he would have one son, Vigen (born 1920 in Yerevan). After the outbreak of World War I he was amnestied and returned to Tiflis. He then worked as a doctor on the Caucasian front.

In November 1917, he was elected a member of the Russian Constituent Assembly (which formed following the February Revolution) and served as commissar for public welfare of the Transcaucasian Commissariat. He was also a member of the Transcaucasian Seim in 1918. In June 1918, he was sent by the Armenian National Council to Berlin to seek recognition and protection for Armenia, then participated in the Paris Peace Conference as a member of the Republic of Armenia's delegation. In May 1918, Ohanjanyan's eldest son from his first marriage, Monik, was killed while fighting against invading Ottoman forces in the Battle of Karakilisa.

=== First Republic of Armenia ===
In January 1920 he went to Yerevan and took up the position of minister of foreign affairs in the cabinet of Prime Minister Alexander Khatisian. After the resignation of Khatisian's government following the Bolshevik uprising of May 1920, Hamo Ohanjanian became prime minister, leading what is referred to as the bureau-government, as it consisted almost entirely of members of the ARF's top executive body, the party Bureau. Ohanjanyan's government followed a policy of open authoritarianism. It imposed martial law, suspended civil liberties, used the army to crush the Bolshevik rebellion, and executed several of its leaders. After this victory, the Armenian army went on to defeat Muslim rebels in districts near Yerevan and advance toward Nakhichevan by the end of July 1920. Before they could restore Armenian control over Nakhichevan, they were intercepted by the Red Army, which occupied parts of Karabakh, Zangezur and Nakhichevan to establish an overland link with Kemalist Turkey.

It was during Ohanjanyan's premiership, on 10 August 1920, that the unimplemented Treaty of Sèvres was signed, by which Armenia was supposed to receive significant territories in Western Armenia. While engaging in negotiations with Soviet Russia, Ohanjanyan's government was distrustful of the Soviets and maintained a pro-Entente orientation; Ohanjanyan himself was considered a member of the "intensely anti-Bolshevik" wing of the ARF leadership. In September 1920, Kemalist Turkey invaded Armenia, and after a series of crushing defeats, Ohanjanyan's government resigned on 23 November 1920 to allow another cabinet led by Simon Vratsian to negotiate peace terms.

=== Exile ===
Following the sovietization of Armenia, Ohanjanyan was arrested by the Bolsheviks on 6 December 1920 near Karakilisa along with other ARF leaders while attempting to flee to Georgia. He was released during the February Uprising of 1921, when Soviet rule was briefly overthrown in Armenia. He fled to Iran after the restoration of Soviet rule and from there went to Egypt. He lived the rest of his life in Cairo, working as a doctor and continuing his activities as a member of the ARF Bureau. He was one of the founders of Hamazkayin, an educational and cultural organization active in the Armenian diaspora to this day. Ohanjanyan died on 31 July 1947.

== Bibliography ==
- Berberian, Houri (2021). Gendered Narratives of Transgressive Politics: Recovering Revolutionary Rubina. Edinburgh: Edinburgh University Press. doi:10.1515/9781474462648-006. ISBN 9781474462648. Archived from the original on 19 May 2022.

Political offices
Preceded by Alexander Khatisian	Prime Minister of the First Republic of Armenia; 1920	Succeeded by Simon Vratsian
