= Sophie Areshian =

Armenian revolutionary

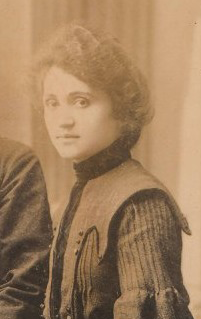
- Born: 1881; Tbilisi, Russian Empire
- Died: 21 April 1971 (aged 89–90); Montreal, Canada
- Political party: Armenian Revolutionary Federation
- Spouse: Hamo Ohanjanyan

Sophie Areshian (Armenian: Սոֆի Արեշյան; 1881–1971), also known by her pseudonym of Rubina, was an Armenian revolutionary and fedayi. She joined the Armenian Revolutionary Federation (ARF) after meeting several leaders of the organization in Baku, she became politically aligned with the far left under their influence. She quickly earned the trust and friendship of Christapor Mikaelian, one of the organization's founders, and was invited to participate in Operation Nejuik, which aimed to assassinate Sultan Abdul Hamid II, the principal orchestrator of the Hamidian massacres that resulted in the deaths of between 100,000 and 300,000 Armenians. Areshian became deeply involved in the project and took on a central role in its execution, especially after Mikaelian's death. She was responsible for setting up the bombs for detonation and activating the timer during the culmination of the plot, the Abdul Hamid II assassination attempt in Yıldız.

Sentenced to death in absentia, Areshian became a prominent figure within the ARF over time, with the failures of the plot being attributed to her rival within the commando, Martiros Margarian. She later accompanied other ARF leaders during their arrest by the Russian Empire, which led to her own imprisonment. After her release, she visited Hamo Ohanjanian, the future Prime Minister of Armenia, in Siberia and married him there. She also played an active role in founding the Hamazkayin network, the leading network of Armenian diaspora schools.

Her memory, largely forgotten and obscured, was revived in the early 21st century by Gaïdz Minassian and Houri Berberian.

== Biography ==
=== Youth and first political encounters ===
Sophie Areshian was born in 1881 in Tbilisi to a wealthy Armenian family that owned land but was Russian-speaking. Her father and brother were high-ranking officers in the Russian army. At the time, Tbilisi was a vibrant cultural hub and home to the largest Armenian population in the Caucasus. It was also a melting pot of various communities and a hotspot for revolutionary ideas. Areshian graduated from high school at the age of 19 and began teaching workers in the oil industry in Baku.

In Baku, she lived with her sister and brother-in-law, making her a neighbor of Nikol Duman, one of the leaders of the Armenian Revolutionary Federation (ARF). During her stay, she met several ARF leaders, including its co-founder Christapor Mikaelian and Martiros Margarian. It was also in Baku that she met her future husband, Hamo Ohanjanian, who would later become the Prime Minister of the First Republic of Armenia. Reflecting on their initial relationship, she later remarked:

I promise that we loved each other in silence and thus began our tragedy – after all, was he not married?

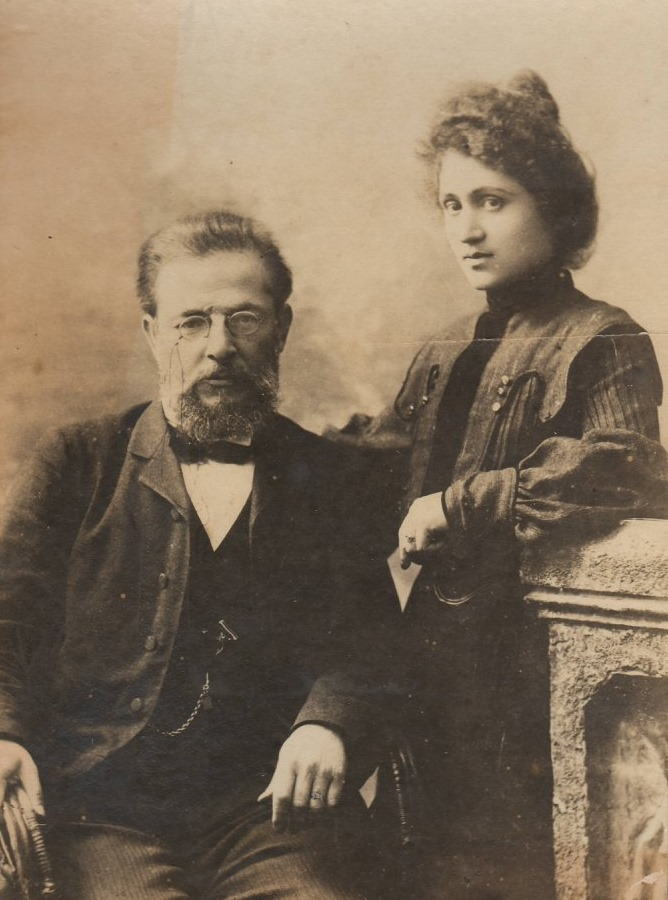
Christapor Mikaelian and Sophie Areshian (1904)

According to Gaïdz Minassian, Areshian may have had an intimate relationship with Mikaelian during this period, but this claim is contested by Houri Berberian, who points out that Minassian provided no sources and seemed to rely on rumors spread later by Martiros Margaryan, with whom Areshian had a contentious relationship. In any case, Areshian herself stated that her political awakening occurred through her interactions with Mikaelian and Ohanjanian, which led her to join the Armenian national liberation movement. She later reflected: 'I was shaken; all this was a new world for me’. Areshian began learning Armenian in 1903, at around the age of 22, as noted by her comrade Abraham Gyulkhandanyan.

The revolutionary seems to have made a strong impression on Mikaelian, as he soon invited her to join him in the plot to assassinate Abdul Hamid II. Areshian accepted the invitation and set out. She first traveled to Greece, where she adopted the alias Rubina Fein, posing as the daughter of a Jewish merchant named Samuel Fein, who was, in fact, Mikaelian. Using this false identity, she then traveled to Smyrna and later to Constantinople, arriving in 1904.

Before involving her more deeply in the project, the organizers held a meeting to discuss whether women should be included in the assassination attempt or "spared" from such tasks. However, they decided it was inappropriate to debate this issue without consulting the women themselves. On 4 December 1904, 'Rubina', 'Emille' (Marie Seitz), and 'Michelle' joined the discussions and declared their full willingness to participate in the project. They expressed offense at the very question and stated that, if necessary, they would carry out the operation on their own. The inclusion of women in such a significant role within an organization like the ARF was not surprising, given the prominent presence of women in leftist revolutionary movements of the era.

=== Yildiz attempt ===
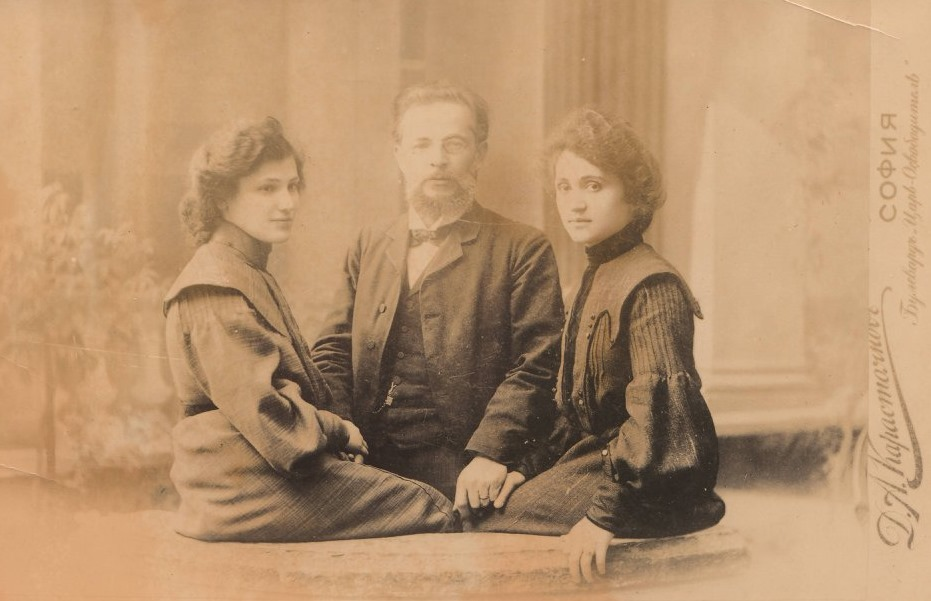
Christapor Mikaelian with Areshian and her sister

The ARF decided to assassinate Abdul Hamid II in retaliation for the Hamidian massacres, a series of mass killings targeting Armenians in the Ottoman Empire, orchestrated under the sultan. Alongside Areshian, Mikaelian Margarian and Seitz, the group included Belgian anarchist Edward Joris and his wife, Anna Nellens, who joined the operation out of ideological alignment. Areshian, one of the few members fluent in German, acted as a liaison between the anarchists and the Armenian militants. The attempt was itself influenced by numerous anarchist ideas, in addition to having a direct connection with several anarchists who joined the project and being organized by Mikaelian. The use of direct action and propaganda by the deed to assassinate a political leader was quite common in anarchist circles during that period.

The group frequently faced disagreements and internal conflicts. After Areshian and Mikaelian initially scouted the location, the group first proposed throwing bombs directly at the sultan to ensure his death by targeting him personally. However, this plan was strongly opposed by Martiros Margarian, who favored using a bomb-laden cart instead, leading to heated disputes among the conspirators. Areshian accused Margarian of cowardice during these debates.

I was astonished; how could one be a revolutionary and be afraid of sacrifice and not take advantage of all the positions available?

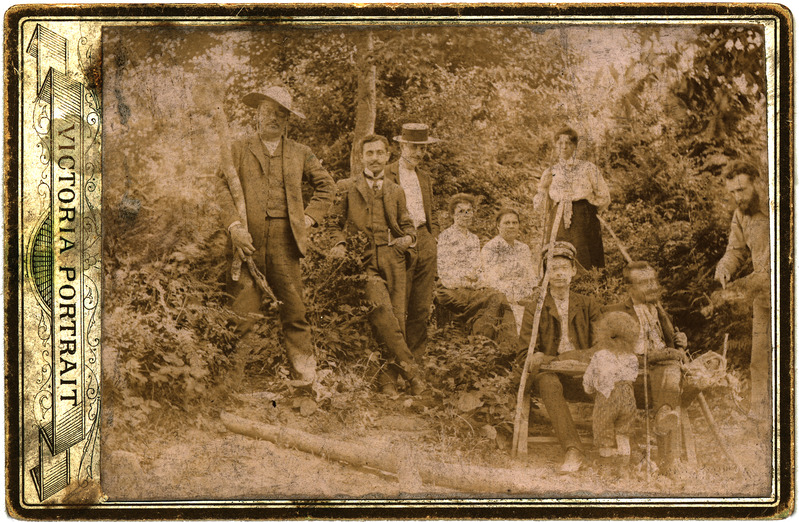
Friends of Joris in 1904, photograph including many members of the Nejuik Operation, whose names are given by Gaidz Minassian and include her, Edward Joris and Anna Nellens, among others

Despite her objections, Margarian’s plan gradually gained traction and was ultimately adopted. The group spent months meticulously preparing for the attack. Areshian and other members visited the mosque dozens of times, calculating every potential location for the explosives and even timing the sultan’s movements to the second as he walked from one point to another.

The plot faced a significant setback with the deaths of Mikaelian and Vramshabouh Kendiryan. Mikaelian, while handling the explosives, made a fatal mistake, and Areshian witnessed the explosion. Calling him affectionately by his Armenian nickname, Hayrik (Father), she realized he was dying and gently closed his eyelids three times. Taking charge of the situation, she ensured the incident was concealed to avoid drawing the authorities' attention. She cleaned the hotel rooms used by the revolutionaries and transferred the remaining explosives to Boris Sarafov, a leader of the Internal Macedonian Revolutionary Organization (IMRO) and an ally of the ARF.

Bulgarian revolutionary Naum Tyufekchiev provided the explosives for the project, though they seemed to be of a bad quality. Areshian clashed with Margarian once again, insisting on completing the operation, even at the cost of her own life. Her determination led Edward Joris, in whose home she was staying, to leave the room in moral disapproval. Areshian and Margarian then drew lots to decide who would detonate the bomb. When the lot fell to her, she was greatly satisfied.

On the eve of the attack, the conspirators gathered the explosives. The following morning, 21 July 1905, they set off in the bomb-laden cart carrying kilograms of melanite. The pretext chosen by the four members—Areshian, Martiros Margarian, Emille, and the cart driver, Zareh—was that they were buying flowers for her. The group headed toward the mosque. Areshian brought scissors with her, sparking an argument with Margarian, as they would allow her to trigger the explosion instantly by cutting the bomb’s activation mechanism, which he deemed "unnecessary and superfluous". She also carried a revolver in case she was apprehended.

Upon arriving in front of the mosque, Areshian set the bomb’s timer to one minute and twenty-four seconds at precisely 12:43:36. The group fled, confident in the success of their mission.

After the bombing, she sought refuge with the three other members of the group near Joris’s residence, where Seitz could monitor his comings and goings. Joris had informed the group that he would join them so they could coordinate and likely escape together. However, when he arrived, he had lunch without acknowledging them, then left the building again in plain view, giving no indication of recognizing them. As time passed, Areshian and the others decided to wait until six o’clock, the time Joris usually left work and returned home. Their plan to flee Constantinople quickly was already compromised, as the delay caused them to miss the last ferries departing for Piraeus and the Russian Empire. By six o’clock, Joris was still nowhere to be seen—he was, in fact, attending the 75th-anniversary celebration of Belgian independence at a luxuous hotel in the city. The group decided to leave around 7:30 p.m., seven hours after the attack. Still posing as Margarian’s wife, while Areshian pretended to be Zareh’s companion, the four managed to reach the train station and board the last train to Sofia, with the assistance of Turkish police officers who helped load their luggage onto the train. Onboard, the group was elated. The revolutionaries shook hands and congratulated one another, convinced that Abdul Hamid II was dead and the attack had been a success.

In Sofia, Areshian received the news of the failure of the attack. While the explosion killed 21 people and injured 58 others, Sultan Abdul Hamid II emerged completely unscathed. He had stopped to converse with Mehmet Cemaleddin Efendi inside the mosque, delaying his exit and narrowly avoiding the blast.

=== Following events ===
After her escape, alongside other organizers of the group—some, like Edward Joris, having been captured by the police—Martiros Margarian accused Areshian of being responsible for the failure of the attack. Areshian vehemently defended herself, and the two openly clashed within the Armenian Revolutionary Federation (ARF). Margarian's portrayal of her was deeply sexist, painting her as a hysterical woman who would panic at the first sign of trouble. This depiction was particularly incongruous, given that Areshian had played pivotal roles: setting the bombs during the attack, concealing the explosion and Mikaelian's death, and coordinating with Sarafov to hide the explosives.

Despite its inaccuracy, this characterization of her as unreliable persisted for a long time within the Armenian national liberation movement, largely because Areshian’s defense was marginalized and obscured. However, this narrative failed to convince the ARF leadership, which attributed the majority of the mission’s failures to Margarian and largely absolved Areshian of blame. Some members of the ARF even advocated for Margarian's assassination in response to his actions.

In any case, the Ottoman authorities were unaware of Areshian’s identity. In their reports following the attack, they described her as:

Robina Fein, also known as Nadejda Datalian, daughter of Wolf, a young Armenian from the Caucasus, whose real name is unknown. She participated in the plans and activities of the Committee in Constantinople and played an active role in the explosion of the cart bomb.

Ottoman justice found her guilty of:

preparation of the criminal enterprise [...] including taking part in all the deliberations [...] taking an effective part in the tests of explosive devices, the study and the preparation of the infernal machine [...] lending herself as an inspired virgin to the attempts of the organisers to garner followers, to excite revolutionary ideas and to stimulate the activity of the members of the Committee.

This characterization made by Ottoman justice is highlighted by Houri Berberian as a way of denying Areshian any direct involvement in the process. The portrayal of her as a passive figure, akin to a virgin due to her single status, suggests that she was merely swept along by the men in the group. This perspective serves to minimize her central role in the operation—despite being one of its primary organizers and key participants. By reducing her actions and leadership to a passive role, this narrative sought to diminish her contributions and discredit her agency in the revolutionary act.

=== After the attack and later years ===
Her exact actions immediately after the attack and her arrival in Sofia are difficult to trace, but she spent some time in Geneva. In 1908, she accepted an invitation from Khachatur Malumian to join him and returned to Constantinople with Satenik, Hamo Ohanjanian’s sister. Upon learning of Hamo's arrest by the Russian authorities, along with other ARF leaders like Avetis Aharonian and Hovsep Arghutian, she left the Ottoman capital to join the Caucasus. There, she followed the imprisoned leaders and was eventually arrested by Russian authorities herself.

Her brother, Mikhail Areshian, an officer who later became one of the three leaders of the Armenian volunteer units in the Russian army, managed to secure her release under the condition that she not return to the Caucasus, Moscow, or Saint Petersburg. She then settled in Kharkiv for a time, where she pursued medical studies. In 1912, she joined Hamo Ohanjanian in Siberia, where he had been exiled.

The couple married near Irkutsk in 1915 before returning to Tbilissi. In the Caucasus, Areshian worked in military hospitals during the birth of the First Republic of Armenia, of which her husband became prime minister. Following the invasion of the region by the Red Army, they left via Iran and settled in Cairo. There, she participated in the founding of the Hamazkayin network in 1928.

In 1947, Areshian moved to Montreal, where she lived near her only son and his family. In 1968, she was awarded the title of Princess of Cilicia by the Catholicos of Cilicia, Khoren I Paroian. In response to this honor, she humbly remarked 'What have I done anyway?'

Areshian died in 1971 in Montreal.

== Decorations ==
- Princess of Cilicia (1968) by the Catholicossate of Cilicia

== Bibliography ==
- Berberian, Houri (2021). "2 Gendered Narratives of Transgressive Politics: Recovering Revolutionary Rubina". Gendered Narratives of Transgressive Politics: Recovering Revolutionary Rubina. Edinburgh: Edinburgh University Press. pp. 53–82. doi:10.1515/9781474462648-006. ISBN 9781474462648. Archived from the original on 2022-05-19.
- Alloul, Houssine (2018). To Kill a Sultan: A Transnational History of the Attempt on Abdülhamid II. London: Palgrave Macmillan. ISBN 978-1-137-48931-9.
