= Simon Zavarian =

Armenian teacher and political revolutionary

- Սիմոն Զաւարեան
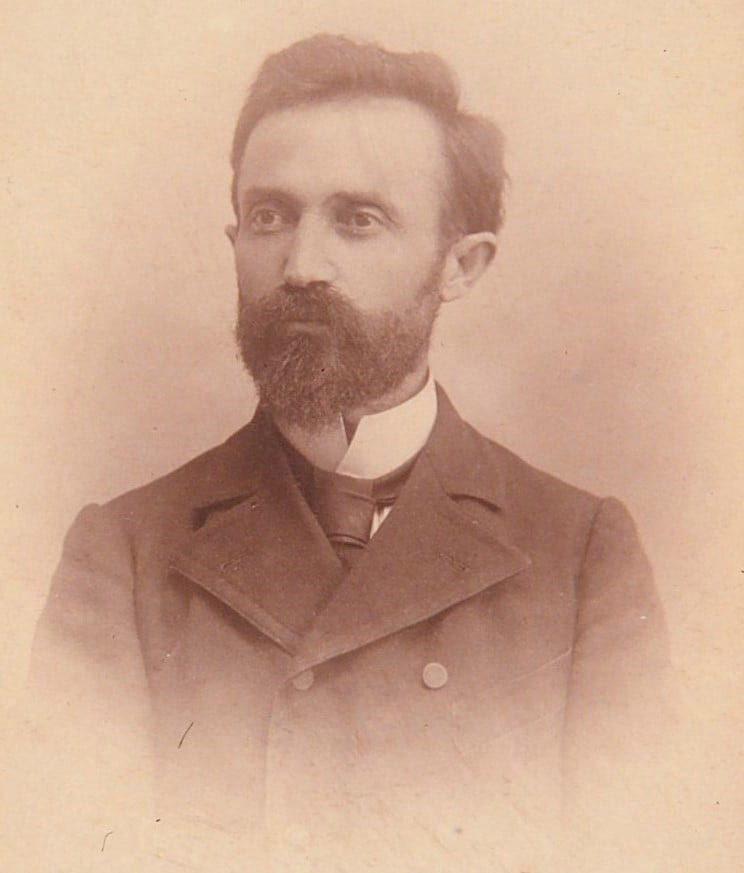

Simon Zavarian (Armenian: Սիմոն Զաւարեան, also known by his nom de guerre Anton, Անտոն; 1866 – 1913) also spelled Simon Zavaryan, was an Armenian political leader and an important leader of the Armenian national liberation movement and one of the three founders of the Armenian Revolutionary Federation, along with Christapor Mikaelian and Stepan Zorian.

== Biography ==
Zavarian was born in the village of Igahat in the Tiflis Governorate of the Russian Empire (now Aygehat in Lori Province, Armenia). He graduated from the Nersisian School in Tiflis, then attended the Petrovsky Agricultural Academy in Moscow, where he met Christapor Mikaelian and Stepan Zorian. In Moscow, he became a member of the Russian revolutionary organization Narodnaya Volya. He later settled in Tiflis, where he co-founded the Armenian Revolutionary Federation (ARF) with Christapor Mikaelian and Stepan Zorian in 1890.

Zavarian played a prominent role in the creation of the party's plans and rules and served as the executive officer of the party's eastern Bureau. He also conducted research for the party and performed organizational work during his many travels across Europe and the Ottoman Empire. In 1902, he went to Geneva, where he served as a member of the editorial board of Droshak, the ARF's official newspaper.

During the 1908 Ottoman Constitutional Revolution, he participated in the development of plans for reforms for Ottoman Armenians and used the archives of the Armenian Patriarchate of Constantinople to develop a census of the number of Armenians living in Western Armenia. After 1908, Zavarian traveled to Mush and Sasun as a teacher and inspector-general of Armenian schools. He settled in Constantinople in 1911, where he taught at the Yessayan School and worked on the ARF newspaper Azadamard.

Zavarian died of a heart attack in 1913 in Constantinople. He was buried in Tiflis.

== Sources ==
- Simon Zavarian biography in English and Armenian
- Mihran Kurdoghlian, Badmoutioun Hayots, C. Hador (translators from the Armenian), Armenian History, volume III, p. 34, Athens, Greece: 1996 ISBN 9780520088030
