= Naum Tyufekchiev =

Bulgarian Revolutionary

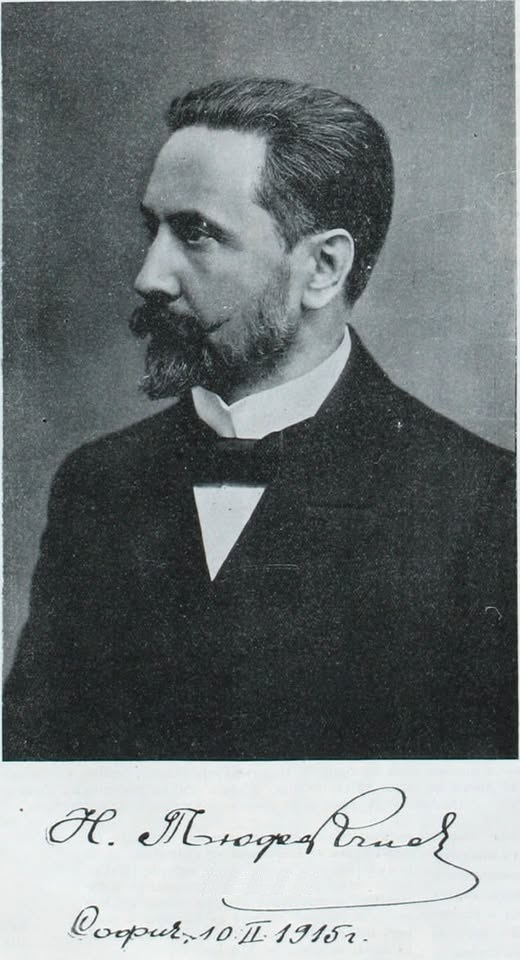
- Born: 29 June 1864
- Died: 25 February 1916 (aged 51)

Naum Tyufekchiev (Bulgarian: Наум Тюфекчиев, romanized as Naum Tûfekčiev), 1864-1916), was a Bulgarian revolutionary, explosives expert, tactician, and anarchist arms dealer. He was a member of the Supreme Macedonian-Adrianople Committee (SMAC), and one of its leaders.

He served as both an instructor in urban guerrilla warfare, methods of terrorism, and pyrotechnics, as well as a hub for arms trade. He also took part in plots, bombings, and assassinations across the Balkans.

Furthermore, he engaged in numerous collaborations with foreign revolutionary movements, such as the Armenian Revolutionary Federation (ARF), participating in their Operation Nejuik, the Committee of Union and Progress (CUP), the Bulgarian Red Brotherhood and the Russian Social Democratic Labour Party (RSDLP). He shared or sold his expertise as an explosives expert and weapons to various movements, and was responsible, among other things, for establishing the first revolutionary explosives workshops in the Russian Empire.

He was assassinated by order of Todor Aleksandrov, the leader of the Internal Macedonian Revolutionary Organization (IMRO) on 25 February 1916, in Sofia, Bulgaria.

== Biography ==
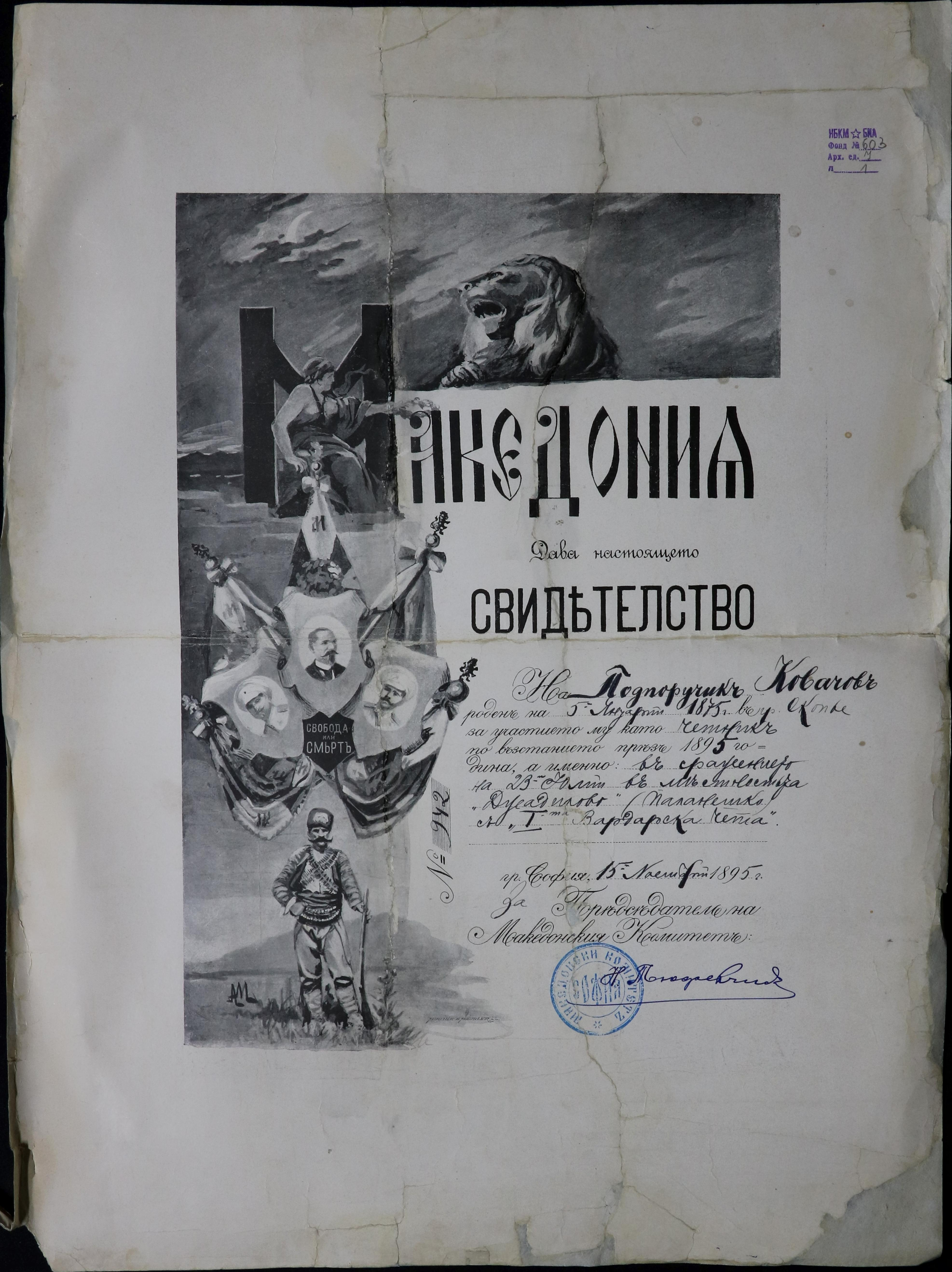
Certificate of the Bulgarian army officer Vladislav Kovachev for his participation in the Supreme Macedonian Committee chetas' action, issued in 1895 and signed by Naum Tyufekchiev.

He was born in Resen, Ottoman Empire, now North Macedonia on 29 June 1864. He studied pyrotechnics in Liège, Belgium.

In 1891, he was involved in a plot to assassinate Stefan Stambolov, the then Bulgarian Prime Minister criticized for his authoritarian methods and good relations with the Ottoman Empire, alongside his two brothers and Dimitar Rizov. The attempt failed, but managed to kill the Minister of Finance, Hristo Belchev. His brother Dencho was captured, tortured, and died in custody, but Naum managed to escape to Serbia and then to Odesa. He was sentenced to death in absentia.

In 1892, he arrived in Constantinople using false papers under the name Ivan Hristo. There, he organized the assassination of the Bulgarian physician and diplomat Georgi Valkovich, a close friend of Stefan Stambolov. He fled and returned to the Russian Empire, where he was sentenced to 15 years of prison in absentia by the Ottoman Empire. Bulgarian secret services accused him of being linked to Russian secret services in carrying out the assassination.

In May 1894, he founded, alongside Evtim Sprostranov, Petar Pop Arsov, Thoma Karayovov, Hristo Popkotsev, Dimitar Mirchev, Andrey Lyapchev, Georgi Balaschev, and Georgi Belev, the Macedonian Youth Society.

He returned to Bulgaria after Stefan Stambolov lost power and took part in a plot that eventually assassinated Stambolov on 19 July 1895. He was acquitted due to lack of evidence. In 1903, he was elected president of an action committee within the SMAC, representing the anarchist faction. He participated in the Ilinden–Preobrazhenie Uprising against the Ottoman Empire and was also involved in activities in Albania against the Ottoman Empire. He maintained connections with Faik Konica, the leader of Albanian revolutionaries.

In addition to anarchism, Naum Tiufekchiev supported the positions of Boris Sarafov, referred to as "sarafovism".

Following the death of his son Alexander in the early 1900s, he donated 5000 Bulgarian levs to an Eastern Orthodox bishop in North Macedonia, with the intention of having them distributed in honor of his son to the "poor Macedonians." In 1905, he hosted a delegation of Russian anarchists in Bulgaria, teaching them the fundamentals of pyrotechnics so they could establish laboratories within the Russian Empire.

He also developed link with the Armenian Revolutionary Federation (ARF), particularly its leader, Christapor Mikaelian, another anarchist and anti-Ottoman revolutionary. In this capacity, he joined Operation Nejuik, a plot to assassinate Abdul Hamid II in retribution for the Hamidian massacres. The explosives he provided were of very poor quality and may have been responsible for Mikaelian's death, who exploded while handling them. He was suspected for a time by the leadership of the ARF of having deliberately sabotaged the explosives, although historians tend to favor the accident theory. In 1909, he met again with leaders of the Armenian Revolutionary Federation (ARF), providing them with a "significant number of explosives", as well as Austrian rifles and pistols, according to a report by the Okhrana, the secret police of the Russian Empire. They managed to transport the explosives and weapons into Ottoman Armenia and Russian Armenia by loading them onto a steamship that docked in Batumi, Georgia.

He also maintained significant connections with the Bolsheviks, who consulted him. He guided the future Soviet general, who was then a chemist, Georgy Skosarevskii, and received visits from Nikolay Burenin, the leader of the terrorist organization within the Bolshevik movement, on several occasions. After Bulgaria's entry into World War I, he made a donation to restore the institutions of the Bulgarian Exarchate in the regions of Macedonia that were under Serbian and Greek rule.

He was assassinated by Petar Skachkov, on the orders of Todor Aleksandrov, the leader of the Internal Macedonian Revolutionary Organization (IMRO) on 25 February 1916, in Sofia, Bulgaria.

== Bibliography ==
- Alloul, Houssine; Eldem, Edhem; de Smaele, Henk, eds. (2018). To Kill a Sultan: A Transnational History of the Attempt on Abdülhamid II. Palgrave Macmillan UK. ISBN 978-1-137-48931-9.
  - Minassian, Gaïdz. "The Armenian Revolutionary Federation and Operation 'Nejduk'". In Alloul, Eldem & de Smaele (2018), pp. 35–65.
- Berberian, Houri (2021). "2: Gendered Narratives of Transgressive Politics: Recovering Revolutionary Rubina". In Ramazan Hakkı Öztan; Alp Yenen (eds.). Age of Rogues: Rebels, Revolutionaries and Racketeers at the Frontiers of Empires. Edinburgh: Edinburgh University Press. pp. 53–82. doi:10.1515/9781474462648-006. ISBN 9781474462648. Archived from the original on 19 May 2022.
