= Stepan Zorian =

Armenian revolutionary (1867–1919)

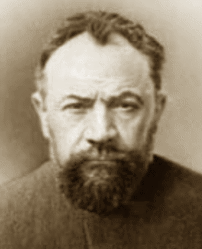
Stepan Zoryan

Stepan Zorian (Armenian: Ստեփան Զօրեան, 1867–1919), better known by his nom de guerre Rostom (Ռոստոմ), was one of the three founders of the Armenian Revolutionary Federation and a leader of the Armenian national liberation movement.

== Founding of the ARF ==
Zorian was born in the village of Tsghna in the Erivan Governorate of the Russian Empire (now located in the Nakhchivan Autonomous Republic of Azerbaijan). He attended college in Moscow but dropped out before graduating. He eventually went to Tiflis, Georgia, where he met Christapor Mikaelian and Simon Zavarian, all would become revolutionaries. They co-founded the Armenian Revolutionary Federation (ARF) in 1890. Their new political party had a major impact on Armenians. It gained support by demanding reforms and taking up arms to defend Armenian citizens of the Ottoman Empire.

== Works and travels ==
Zorian moved to Geneva, Switzerland where he managed the Droshak Journal (Troshag) newspaper, as the editor. In Karin, pretending to be a teapot salesman because ARF party members were banned in Turkey, he established student unions. He later settled in Bulgaria to create cooperation between ARF and the Internal Macedonian Revolutionary Organization in its struggle against Abdul Hamid II. He also opened an Armenian school there with his wife, Lisa Melik Shahnazarian.

== Post-Constitution days ==
During the 1908 Constitutional revolution in Turkey, he moved to Garin. In 1914, World War I broke out, he moved to Europe and then to the Caucasus. There he participated in the Armenian-Tatar wars. During the Iranian Constitutional Revolution, he participated in the revolution alongside Persian revolutionaries. He also directs the fight of self-defense in Baku. After a disastrous result, he fled to Iran with thousands of Armenians.

== Death ==
Zorian died in 1919 in Tiflis, aged 52. He was the only founder of the ARF to live to see an independent Armenia.

== List of works ==
- (1979) Ṛostom Ռոստոմ (in Armenian). Beirut: Hamazgayini Vahē Sētʻean Tparan. 1979. OCLC 19722779. Volume containing works by and about Rostom.
- (1999) Namakani Նամականի [Letters] (in Armenian). Beirut: Hamazgayini Vahē Sētʻean Tparan. OCLC 48508500.
- (2022) Ṛostomi antip namaknerě Ռոստոմի անտիպ նամակները [Rostom's unpublished letters] (in Armenian). Yerevan: Lusakn. ISBN 9789939899077. OCLC 1367880370.

== Sources ==
- Rosdom biography in Armenian and English
- Mihran Kurdoghlian, Badmoutioun Hayots, C. Hador (translated from the Armenian), Armenian History, volume III, p. 34, Athens, Greece: 1996 ISBN 9780520088030
