= Letterenhuis =

Belgian non-profit museum

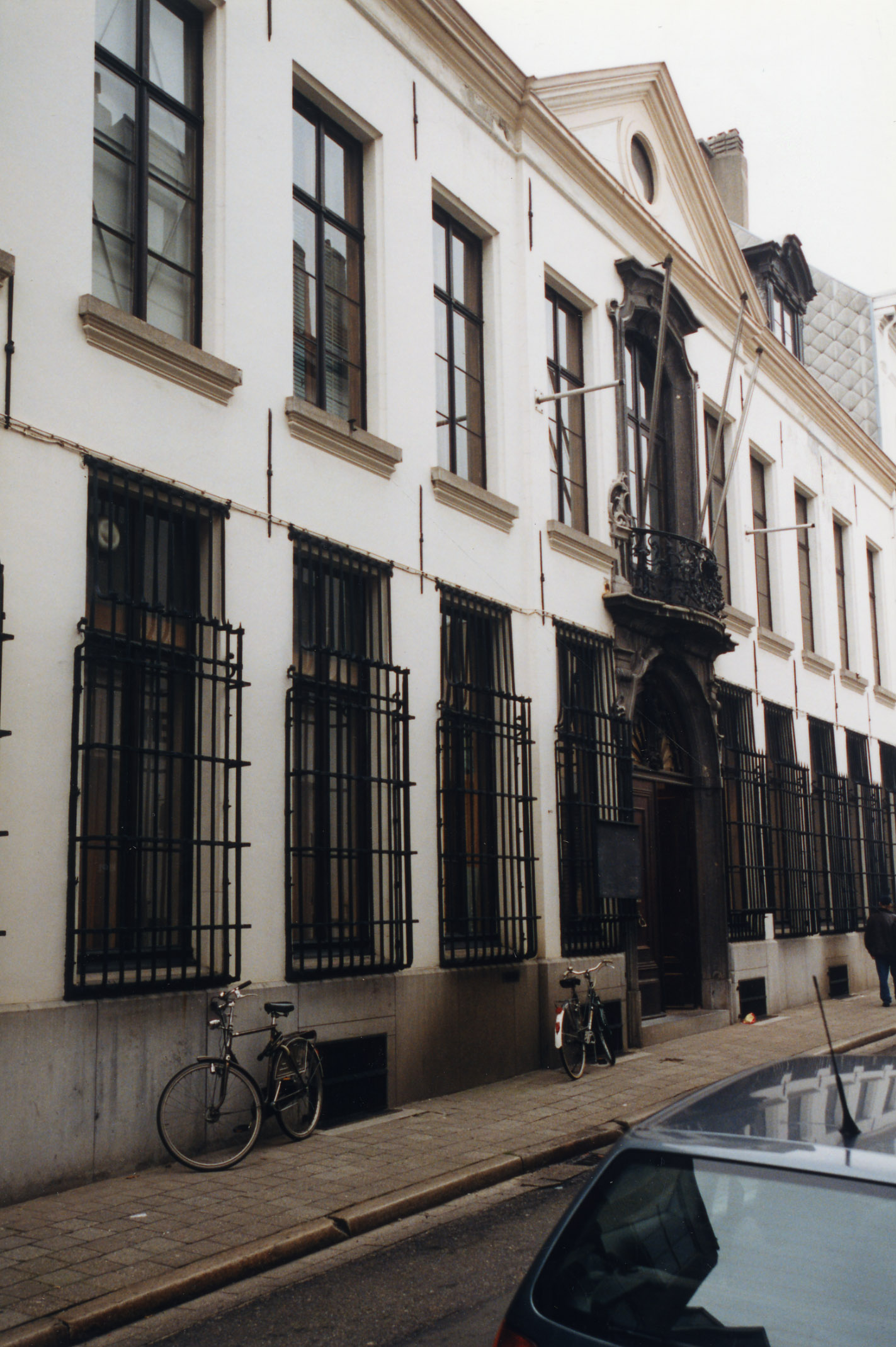
- Interactive map of Letterenhuis
- 51°13′23″N 4°24′17″E
- Location: Antwerp, Belgium
- Website: Official website

The Letterenhuis ("House of Literature") is a Belgian non-profit organization located in Antwerp. The Letterenhuis collects and archives information of Flemish artists, musicians, and writers, as well as portraits concerning Flemish culture as from 1750. The Letterenhuis fulfills two tasks: on the one hand it is an archiving and documentation centre and on the other hand it is a museum. The most interesting part of its collection are the manuscripts of famous Belgian authors like Hendrik Conscience, Willem Elsschot and the contemporary writer Tom Lanoye. In 2012 the Letterenhuis featured a theme exhibition about Louis Paul Boon to honor his one hundredth birth year.

== History ==
The organization was founded in 1933 as the Museum van de Vlaamsche Letterkunde ("Museum of Flemish Literature"). The collection was based on the Conscience-archive and the Hugo Verriest legacy. Just after World War II the name was changed into Archief en Museum voor het Vlaamse Cultuurleven ("Archive and Museum for the Flemish Cultural Life"). In 2002, the name was changed into the present Letterenhuis. The Letterenhuis moved into its present location in 1958, which is located adjacent to its original location in the Minderbroedersstraat. Since 2004 the Letterenhuis is acknowledged as the cultural archive for the Flemish literary heritage.

== Main Exhibition ==
The Letterenhuis contains a huge archive of manuscripts, notes, diaries, etc. These objects are complemented by biographies about Flemish authors and scientific publications about their works. The museum also draws attention to the writing process and the way literature is received by critics and the public. The emphasis of the exhibitions is on contemporary literature, starting from 1950.

== Theme exhibitions ==
Year	Theme	
2002	Leeuwen van Vlaanderen	Exhibition about the start of modern Flemish literature, with Hendrik Conscience's De leeuw van Vlaanderen as initial point.
2003	'Expo 'Eindelijk! Lanoye genaaid, gebonden & in leer'	Exhibition focussing on the bibliophilic editions of Lanoye's novels; a crossing between literature and art.
2003	Godfried Bomans, de fluwelen duivel	Exhibition about Godfried Bomans' archive
2005	Jeroen Brouwers	Exhibition about Jeroen Brouwers' archive
2006	Verre horizonten	Exhibition about the way authors push boundaries between cultures and people. The focus is on five authors and their connection with a certain country or city.
2008	Installatie van Johan van Geluwe	Johan van Geluwe reflects about 75 years Letterenhuis
2009	Dooreman naar de letter	Exhibition about graphic artist Gert Dooreman
2010	Dicht bij Elsschot	Exhibition about Willem Elsschot
2012	Vila Isengrimus	Exhibition about Louis Paul Boon
2013	HAUSER.Expo. Een multimediaal epos	Exhibition about Kaspar Hauser, who was an inspiration for poets Annemarie Estor and Lies van Gasse
2014	Verre vrienden. Brieven van buitenlandse schrijvers	Contacts between Flemish and foreign authors and artists
2015	De Beukelaer's Fabrieken	Photos, film and objects from 1925 and 2015 of Jimmy Kets and the archives of De Beukelaer
2015-16	On the Job for Victory	World War I posters of the United States
2016-17	Escaut! Escaut!	A literairy journey on the Scheldt
2017-18	Hugo Claus	The archives of Hugo Claus

== Gallery ==
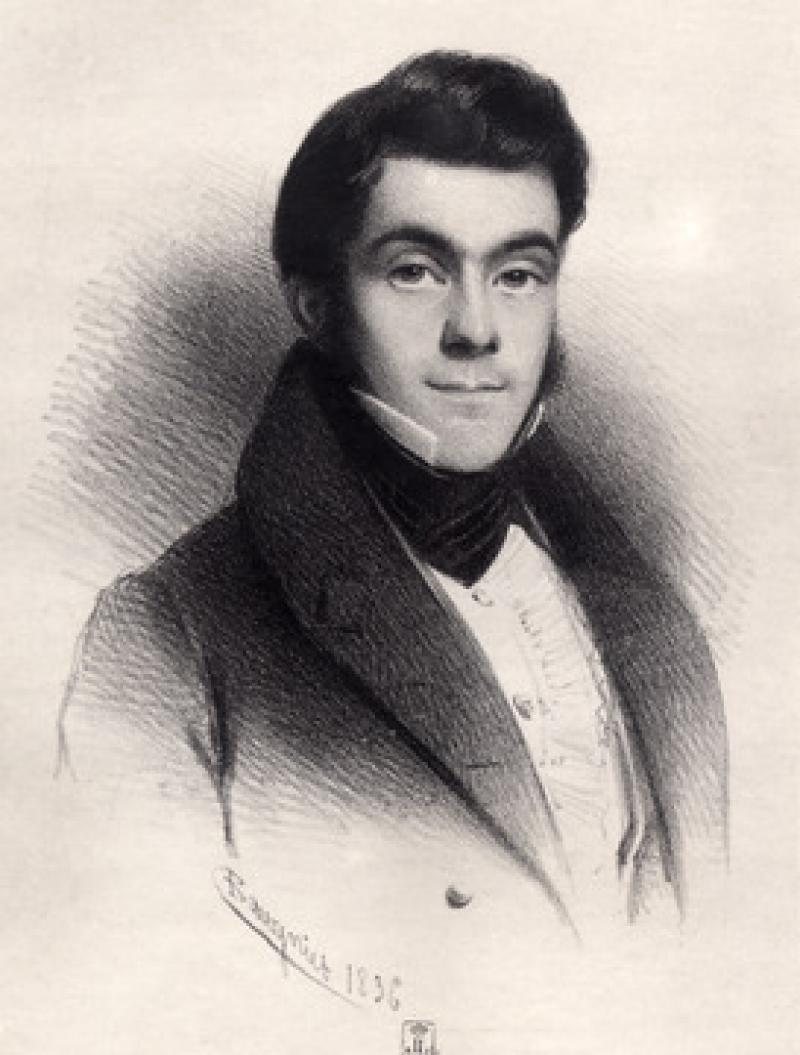
Drawing of Philip Blommaert by Baugniet (1836)

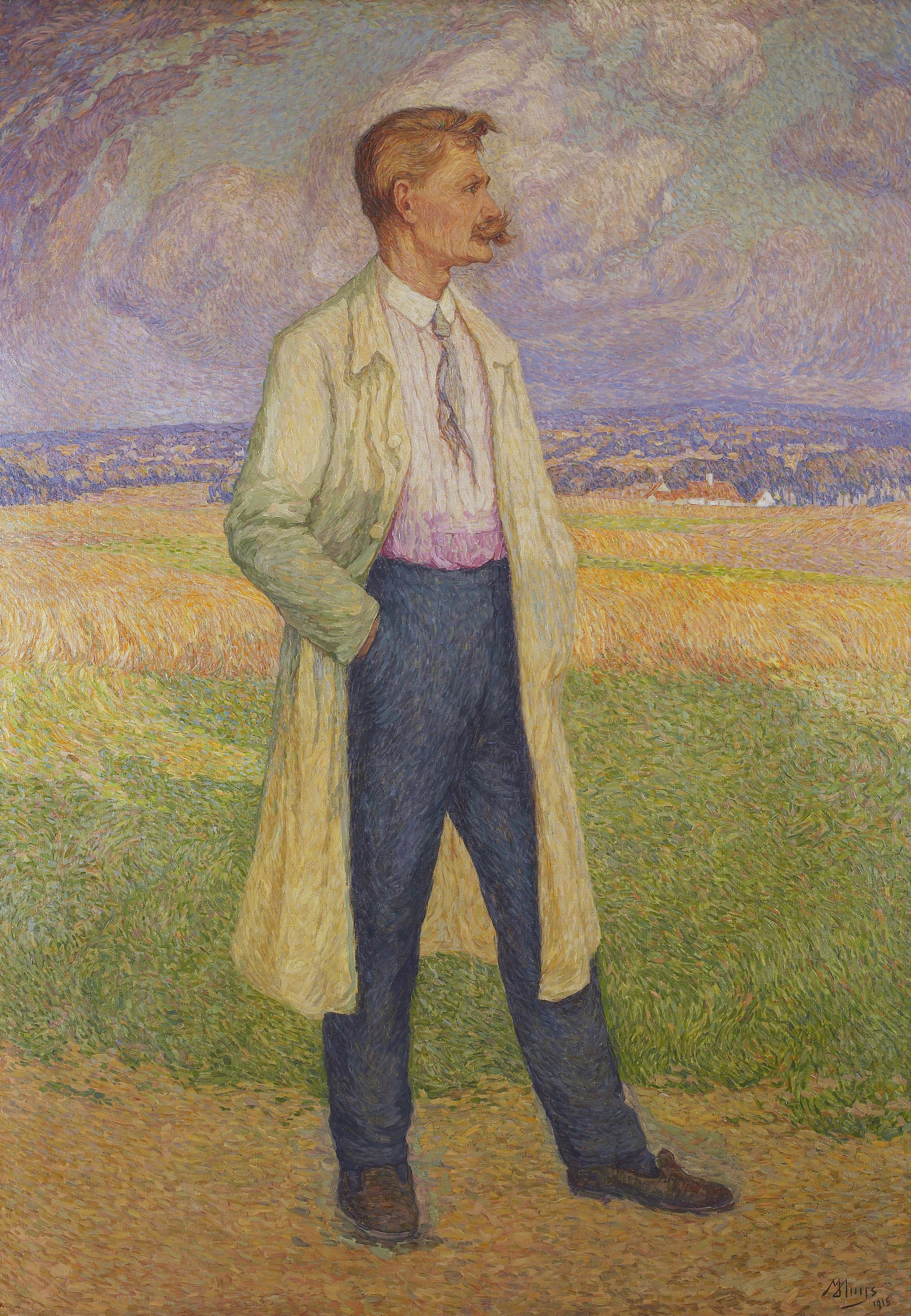
Stijn Streuvels by Modest Huys

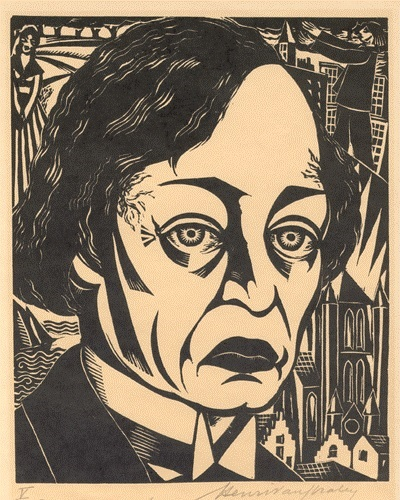
Karel van de Woestijne by Henri van Straten

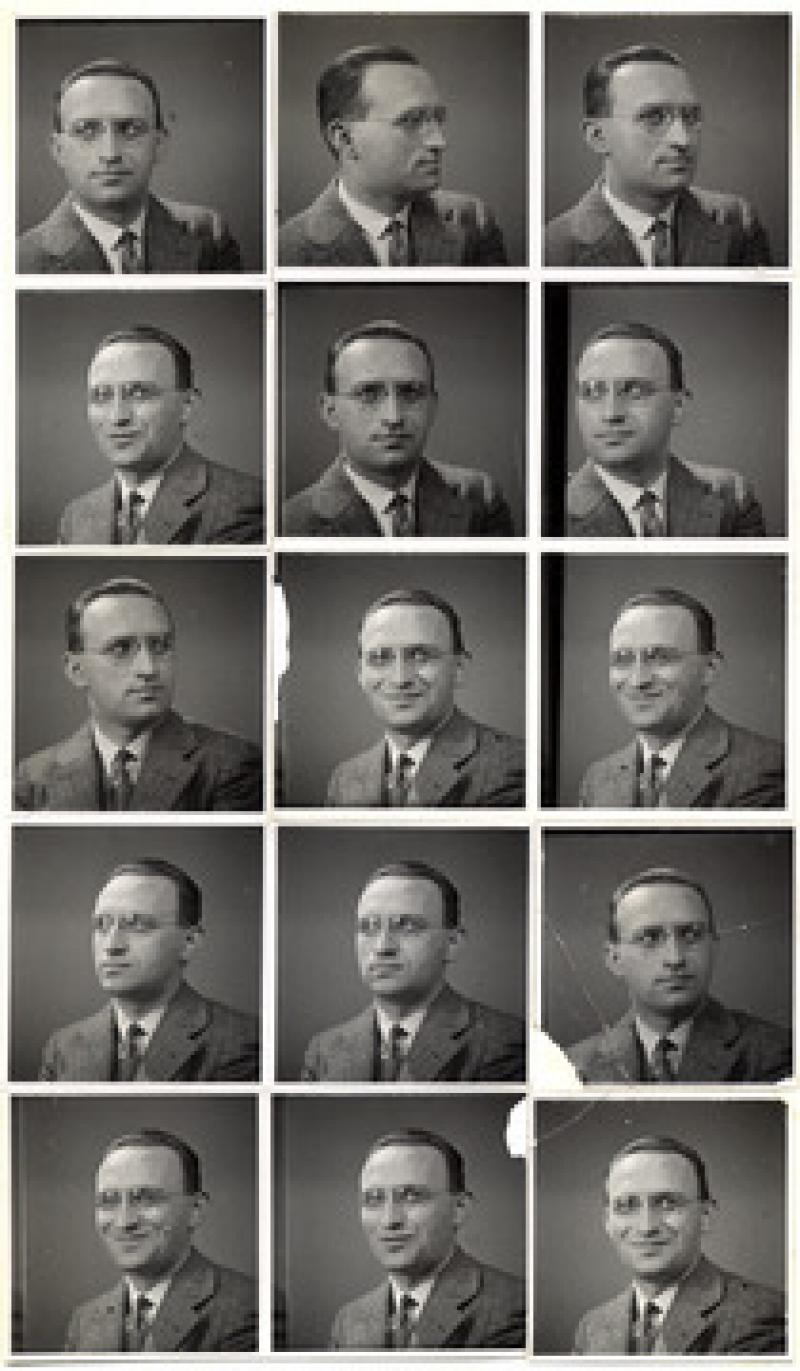
Marnix Gijsen

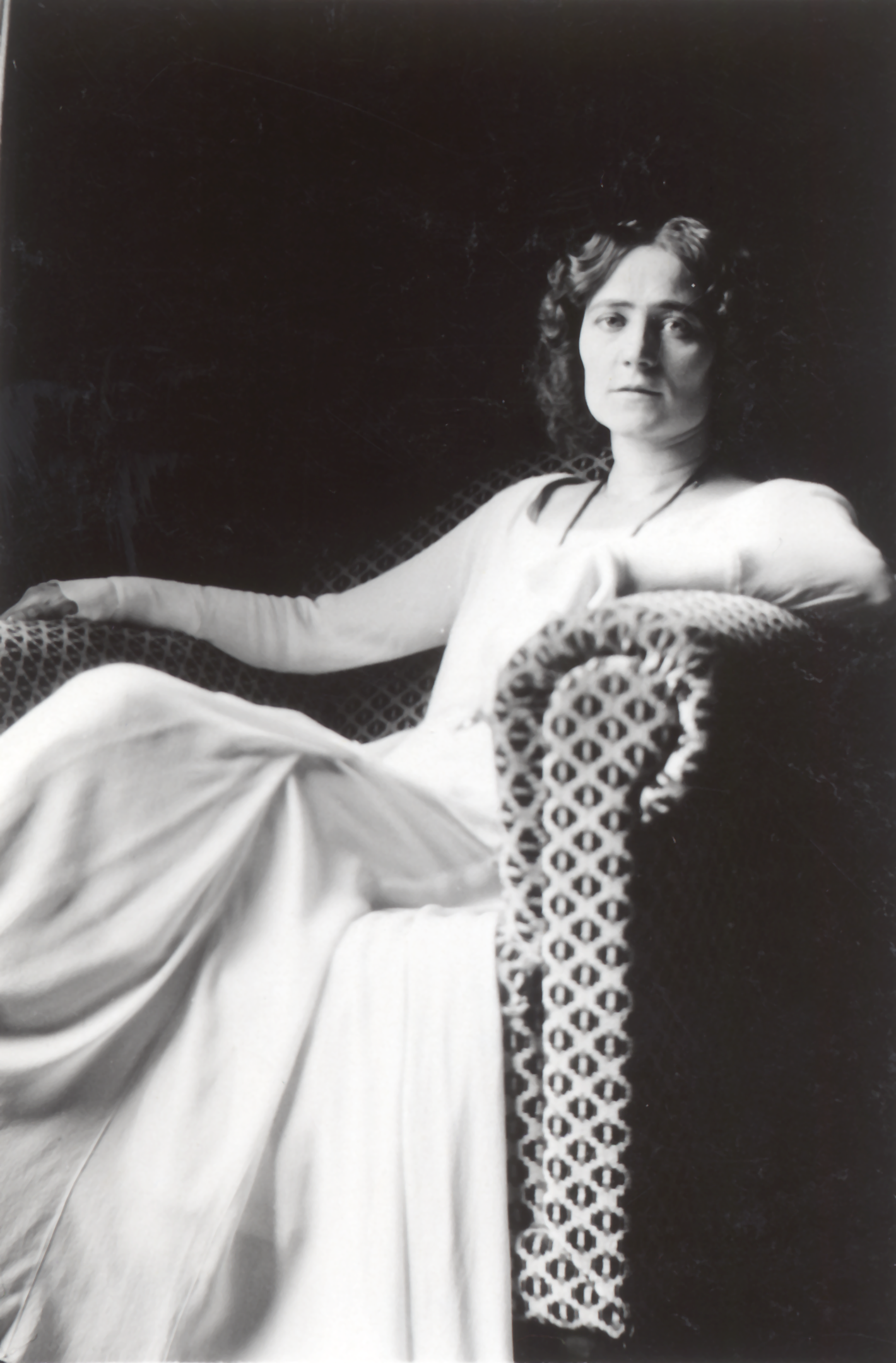
Alice Nahon

== See also ==
- Arkprijs van het Vrije Woord
- Belgian literature
- Flemish literature

== Sources ==
Media related to Letterenhuis at Wikimedia Commons

- Official website
