= Pro Armenia =

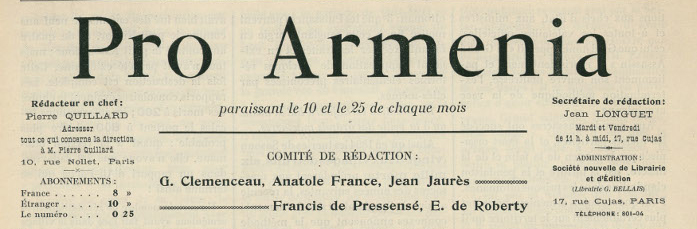
First issue

Pro Armenia (1900–1914) was a French-language fortnightly that took pro-Armenian positions. The goal of the journal was to raise awareness in Europe about the plight of Armenians in the Ottoman Empire. It was founded at the initiative of Christapor Mikaelian, a co-founder of the Armenian Revolutionary Federation, enlisting the help of a number of prominent Dreyfusard and leftist intellectuals. Pierre Quillard was its editor-in-chief and Jean Longuet was its secretary. The members of its editorial committee were Georges Clemenceau, Anatole France, Jean Jaurès, Francis de Pressensé, and Edmond de Roberty. It temporarily ceased publication after the 1908 Ottoman constitutional revolution. It was published again in 1912 and 1913 under the title Pour les Peuples d’Orient. In 1914, the last year that the journal was published, it resumed its original name.
