= Droshak =

Droshak logo

Droshak (Troshag, Armenian: Դրօշակ, "Flag") is the official organ of the Armenian Revolutionary Federation (ARF) published in Tiflis (1890), Balkans (1890s), Geneva (1892-1914), Paris (1925–33), Beirut (1969–85), Athens (1986-96), Yerevan (since 1999). It was first published in 1890 by ARF founder Christapor Mikaelian as a monthly, then as a bi-monthly, bi-weekly, and weekly. Initially published as an illegal newspaper in Tiflis (Tbilisi) in the Russian Empire, it was established as a legal publication in Geneva in 1892, where it continued to be published until 1914, when publication was ended due to the start of the First World War. Its primary subject was the ideological questions of the party and the Armenian national liberation movement. It resumed publication in Paris in 1925, only to end again in 1933. During this period, the paper dealt with political and ideological questions regarding the situation in Soviet Armenia (where the ARF was banned) and debates between communism and socialism. It was reestablished as a weekly in Beirut in 1969. It was moved to Athens in 1986 (where it was published bi-weekly) after the kidnapping of its editor Sarkis Zeitlian. Droshak's editorial board returned to Lebanon in 1996. Still, publication continued in Athens. After officially registering Droshak in Armenia in 1999, the editorial board and publication moved to Yerevan. Since then, it has been released in print quarterly and publishes weekly online.

Editors:

- Christapor Mikaelian
- Rostom (Stepan Zorian)
- Alexander Atabekian
- Honan Davtian
- Mikael Varandian
- Simon Vratsian
- Babgen Papazian
- Sarkis Zeitlian
- Nazareth Berberian
- Karen Khanlarian
- Artashes Shahbazian

and others.
