= Christapor Mikaelian =

Armenian revolutionary (1859–1905)

- Քրիստափոր Միքայէլեան
- Born: 18 October 1859; Verin Agulis, Nakhichevan, Erivan, Russian Empire
- Died: 17 March 1905 (aged 45); Sablyar, Kyustendil, Bulgaria
- Other names: Hellen (Էլլէն); Topal (Թոփալ); Edward (Էդուարդ)
- Citizenship: Russian
- Political party: Armenian Revolutionary Federation
- Movement: Armenian national liberation movement

Christapor Mikaelian (Armenian: Քրիստափոր Միքայէլեան, romanized: Kristapor Mikayelian; (Note: In Reformed orthography: Քրիստափոր Միքայելյան; sometimes translated to the English: Christopher Mikaelian.) 18 October 1859 – 17 March 1905) was an Armenian revolutionary who played a leading role in the Armenian national liberation movement.

Born in Nakhichevan, he became a teacher and worked to educate migrant workers from Western Armenia. During the mid-1880s, after the Russian Empire decreed the closure of parochial schools in Armenia, he became involved in revolutionary activism. He moved to Moscow and joined Narodnaya Volya, through which he met Stepan Zorian and Simon Zavarian, and which informed his conversion to revolutionary socialism and Bakuninism. Upon returning to the Caucasus, he established the revolutionary organization Young Armenia and began organizing violent actions against the Ottoman Empire. Together with Zorian and Zavarian, Mikaelian established the Armenian Revolutionary Federation (ARF), in which he became a leading figure.

During the 1890s, he edited the ARF's newspaper Droshak and organised a number of actions, including the Khanasor Expedition of 1897. He then moved to Geneva, where he took a role in the ARF's Western Bureau, soliciting support for their cause from Western Armenophiles, particularly French and Italian anarchists. He also took command of an operation to exact a "revolutionary tax" from rich Armenians, in order to fund their revolutionary activities. By the turn of the 20th century, he had begun planning to assassinate the Ottoman Sultan Abdul Hamid II. He brought together several Armenian revolutionaries, and a couple European anarchists, in order to carry out the plot. Mikaelian himself never saw it through, as he was killed in an accidental explosion while testing explosives in Bulgaria.

Mikaelian's planned assassination attempt against the Sultan on 21 July 1905 failed, leading to the ARF losing western support and facing an internal leadership crisis. The ARF eventually secured the independence of an Armenian Republic, where Mikaelian gained the status of a revolutionary martyr.

== Biography ==
=== Early life and activism ===
Christapor Mikaelian was born in 1859, in the Armenian village of Agulis, in Nakhichevan. His parents died while he was aged 10. In 1870, he enrolled at the normal school in Tbilisi, from which he graduated in 1880. During the early 1880s, he taught migrant workers from Western Armenia how to read and write in the Armenian language, as well as how to handle firearms. By 1884, he had taken over the leadership of an Armenian workers' group in Tbilisi. That same year, an ukaz by the Russian imperial government decreed the closing of all parochial schools in Armenia, in a move that was protested by Mikaelian, who printed and distributed anti-Tsarist pamphlets.

Out of work as a teacher, in 1885, he moved to Moscow, where he enrolled in the Petrovsky Agricultural Academy. There he joined the revolutionary organization Narodnaya Volya, through which he was introduced to Simon Zavarian and Stepan Zorian. At this time, he also adopted the cause of revolutionary socialism, which formed the basis of his proposal for Armenian national liberation through armed struggle. He became a follower of Mikhail Bakunin's anarchist philosophy, which advocated for direct action and decentralization, principles he would hold to throughout his life.

=== Founding the ARF ===
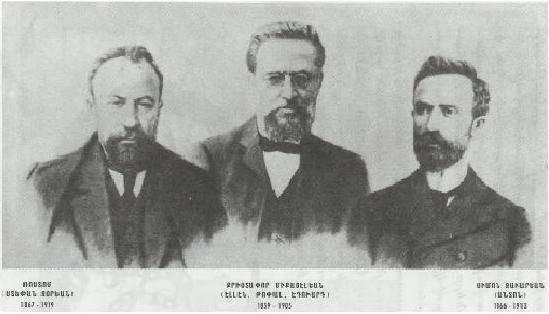
Stepan Zorian (left), Christapor Mikaelian (centre) and Simon Zavarian (right), the founders of the Armenian Revolutionary Federation (ARF)

After the collapse of Narodnaya Volya in the 1880s, Armenian students in Russia began returning to the Caucasus, where they began publishing and distributing revolutionary socialist literature. Mikaelian himself dropped out of university in 1887, in order to return to the Caucasus and initiate a revolutionary campaign. That year, he attempted to establish a revolutionary journal together with Stepan Zorian, but the operative costs were prohibitively high, despite the support of the Herald of Freedom (another Armenian revolutionary journal). Over the subsequent years, he briefly returned to teaching in Tbilisi and his home town of Agulis.

By 1889, Mikaelian had established the revolutionary organization Young Armenia (Armenian: Երիտասարդ Հայաստան, romanized: Yeritasard Hayastan), which was formed to carry out clandestine attacks in Western Armenia, with the eventual aim of launching an armed revolution against the Ottoman Empire. Other Armenian revolutionary groups with different, even opposing, ideologies, from nationalism to liberalism and Marxism, also began gathering in Tbilisi. Emphasising their shared commitment to the liberation of Armenians in the Ottoman Empire through revolutionary struggle, Mikaelian, Zavarian and Zorian managed to unite many of the disparate groups into a single organisation, establishing the Armenian Revolutionary Federation (ARF) in the summer of 1890.

=== Leadership of the ARF ===
The ARF issued a manifesto, calling for Armenians to take action for the liberation of their compatriots in the Ottoman Empire. In Tbilisi, Mikaelian and Zavarian formed the organisation's central committee, which was tasked with organising the revolutionary movement, and began publishing the journal Droshak. One of their first challenges was to quell discord between the Marxists of the Social Democrat Hunchakian Party (SDHP) and the anti-socialists that had joined the ARF. Mikaelian and Zavarian resolved to employ terminology that recognised the goals of the labor movement, while also eschewing specific references to "socialism", which was briefly successful in convincing both parties. However, by 1891, the SDHP grew dissatisfied with its compact with the ARF, believing that the socialists Mikaelian and Zavarian had lost influence to the anti-socialists, and ultimately split from the party.

By the following year, Mikaelian and Zavarian had been arrested and exiled to the Russian colony of Bessarabia, causing the central committee to effectively collapse. Responsibilities for organising the revolutionary movement were taken over by Stepan Zorian, who set about decentralizing the structure of the ARF. Mikaelian and Zavarian managed to escape into Romania, settling in Galați, where Mikaelian edited Droshak. He published the third issue of Droshak in February 1892, before the journal's publication offices were moved to Geneva. Before long Mikaelian and Zavarian had returned to Tbilisi, where they established a political bureau to act as the revolutionary movement's executive body within the party's new decentralized structure. From the bureau, they sent field workers to carry out agitation work in Western Armenia, coordinated the decentralized executive bodies in various regions, distributed funds and oversaw the implementations of proposals from the party's congresses.

At the ARF's first congress in 1892, the party agreed to its political programme, written with the collaboration of Mikaelian and Zavarian, which called for: the liberation of Ottoman Armenia through an insurrection and the establishment of a social democracy in its place; the carrying out of propaganda, education and armed action, including sabotage and assassinations, against the Ottoman Empire; and the decentralization of the party's structure, in order to create a "dynamic network" of autonomous organizations. Over the subsequent years, Mikaelian was actively involved in the ARF's activities in the Caucasus. After being imprisoned for 6 months in 1895, he organized the Khanasor Expedition, a punitive expedition against Kurds who had participated in a massacre of Armenians in Van. He then returned to exile and moving to Geneva in 1898. At the ARF's second congress in 1898, the organization reaffirmed its decentralized structure by establishing a western bureau in Geneva to act alongside the eastern bureau in Tbilisi and ensuring that the bureaus would be elected by and accountable to each ARF congress. Mikaelian was elected to the Geneva Bureau, where he served alongside Stepan Zorian, Armen Garo, Arshak Vramian and Smpad Khachadourian.

That same year, Mikaelian took over as editor-in-chief of Droshak. From this position, he gathered together several Armenian journalists and writers to collaborate on Droshak, including Avetis Aharonian, Avetik Isahakyan, Khachatur Malumian and Sarkis Minassian. He also secured written work from foreign sympathizers such as the Italians Amilcare Cipriani and Ricciotti Garibaldi, and the French Francis de Pressensé, Urbain Gohier and Pierre Quillard. In 1900, Mikaelian oversaw the establishment of the French publication Pro Armenia, edited by Quillard, which solicited contributions from across Western Europe in support of Armenian national liberation. Financed by Mikaelian's Geneva bureau, Pro Armenia published two issues per month until October 1908 and was widely distributed to prominent figures throughout Europe. Through the bureau, Mikaelian managed to secure widespread support for the Armenian national liberation movement in Europe, mobilizing Armenophiles and carrying out propaganda in favor of other national minorities of the Ottoman Empire, notably including the Macedonians. He formed a particularly close alliance with European anarchists, with whom he sympathized due to their shared anti-statism, socialist internationalism and desire to abolish borders. Mikaelian finally stepped down as editor-in-chief of Droshak in 1903, with Sarkis Minassian taking over the position.

=== Assassination plot ===
Seeking revenge for the thousands of Armenians that were killed during the Hamidian massacres, individual Armenian revolutionaries had already begun discussing plans to assassinate Sultan Abdul Hamid II as early as 1896. By April 1901, the ARF's western bureau had itself started making plans to assassinate the Sultan. In order to fund such an action, Mikaelian oversaw command of the Potorig operation, which extorted a "revolutionary tax" from Armenian capitalists. The operation collected 432,500 Francs in total.

In March 1904, Mikaelian attended the ARF's third congress in the Bulgarian capital of Sofia, where it was decided to replace Constantinople's central committee with what it called a "Demonstrative Body" (Armenian: Ցուցադրական մարմին, romanized: Ts’uts’adrakan Marmin), which was tasked with organizing political demonstrations in support of the Sasun resistance. Mikaelian was himself elected to the demonstrative body, alongside Mardiros Markarian, Tuman Tumyan, Sev Ashod and Hovnan Tavtian. They began printing revolutionary literature for distribution, while also clandestinely importing and collecting explosives.

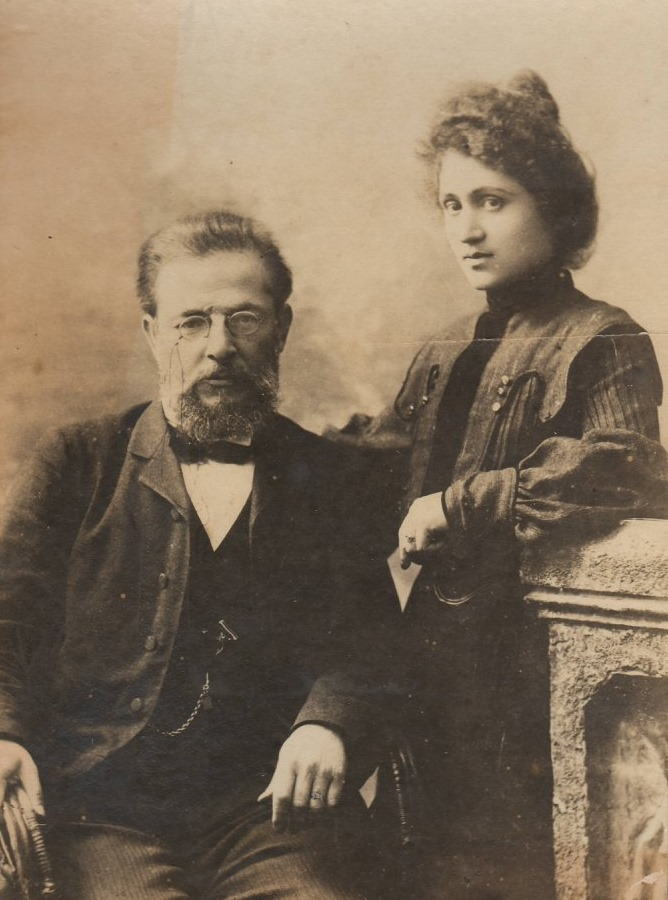
Mikaelian with Sophie Areshian in 1904

By this time, Mikaelian had himself become fixated on the assassination plot. A few months after the ARF's third congress, at a meeting in Athens, the Demonstrative Body decided to moved forward with Mikaelian's assassination plot. Mikaelian himself took charge of the operation, which along with its main objective, also organized sabotage actions in Smyrna. He also enlisted the participation of other revolutionaries, including the Armenians Sophie Areshian, Kris Fenerjian, Vramshabouh Kendirian, Krikor Sayian, as well as the Flemish Edward Joris and the German Sophie Ribbs. Under pseudonyms, most of the revolutionaries moved to Istanbul, while a few remained behind in Bulgaria in order to arrange the transportation of explosives.

In November 1904, Joris rented a flat near the palace, which he made available to Mikaelian and Areshian for the planning of the assassination. The Sultan rarely appeared in public, so they had to choose their moment carefully. Mikaelian initially suggested that they attack the Sultan during a bayram, when he was scheduled to visit the Dolmabahçe Palace, in the old Narodnik method of throwing bombs at his passing carriage. But the Demonstrative Body decided that the best opportunity to kill him would be after Friday prayers, during his weekly visit to the Yıldız Hamidiye Mosque. As the ceremony was "highly ritualized and publicized" event, the revolutionaries planned to present themselves as European guests, whereupon the appearance of the Sultan, they would begin throwing out small bombs they had brought with them and detonate a large bomb hidden in a carriage when the Sultan approached it.

In January 1905, Mikaelian and Kendirian went to Bulgaria, where they began testing the explosives they planned to use. On 17 March [O.S. 4 March] 1905, the two were killed in an accidental explosion, while testing the bombs on the slopes of Vitosha. Mikaelian's funeral was held in Sofia on 23 March [O.S. 10 March] 1905, attended by 6,000 people, including Armenian, Macedonian and Turkish revolutionaries.

== Legacy ==
After Mikaelian's death, Markarian took command of the operation and carried out the assassination attempt on 21 July 1905. But as Markarian had dropped Mikaelian's plan to control the situation with smaller bombs, the carriage explosion was mistimed and the Sultan survived the attempt. 26 people were killed and 58 seriously wounded in the attack.

When the conspirator Edward Joris was arrested, the Ottoman authorities discovered the role of the ARF in the assassination attempt, forcing the revolutionaries to also abort Mikaelian's planned action in Smyrna. The ARF subsequently gained the reputation of a simple terrorist organization, losing many of its prior sympathizers and supporters. In the west, it was directly compared to the anarchist assassins Sante Geronimo Caserio, Gaetano Bresci and Leon Czolgosz. In 1907, the ARF's fourth congress investigated the actions of the Demonstrative Body and held its members to account over the failure. Markarian was expelled from the ARF, both for his failure to assassinate the Sultan, but also because he was believed to be a source of posthumous slander about Mikaelian. The following year, the ARF formed a pact with the Committee of Union and Progress and participated in the Young Turk Revolution, despite Mikaelian's widely known opposition to an alliance with the Turkish nationalists.

Mikaelian himself, considered to have been the main leader of the ARF during his time, had been conferred the status of a revolutionary martyr. Just after his death, Pierre Quillard, a French anarchist close to the ARF and Mikaelian, wrote a tribute in his honor in his journal, Pro Armenia. Following the independence of the South Caucasus, on International Workers' Day in 1918, the ARF-led government of the Armenian Republic held a mass demonstration in which they carried pictures of ARF founders Mikaelian, Zavarian and Zorian, alongside those of Bolshevik leaders Vladimir Lenin and Stepan Shaumian. On the 20th anniversary of their death, in 1925, a memorial to Mikaelian and Kendirian was unveiled in Sofia, where Bulgarian general Ivan Stoijkov revealed to attending ARF members that he had collaborated with Mikaelian on the assassination attempt. This raised conspiracy theories that alleged Mikaelian had been an agent for the Imperial Russian Army, although no concrete evidence of this has been found. Another conspiracy theory alleged that Mikaelian had been murdered, but no solid evidence of this has been found either.

Mikaelian's portrait still hangs in ARF buildings over a century after his death.

== Selected works ==
- Mikayelian, Kristapor (1931) [1906]. Յեղափոխականի մտքերը [Thoughts of a Revolutionary] (PDF) (in Armenian) (2nd ed.). Athens: Armenian Revolutionary Federation. OCLC 46685144.

== Bibliography ==
- Altıntaş, Toygun (2018). "The Ottoman War on 'Anarchism' and Revolutionary Violence". In Alloul, Houssine; Eldem, Edhem; de Smaele, Henk (eds.). To Kill a Sultan. London: Palgrave Macmillan. pp. 99–128. doi:10.1057/978-1-137-48932-6_4. ISBN 978-1-137-48931-9.
- Dasnabedian, Hratch (1990). History Of The Armenian Revolutionary Federation, Dashnaktsutiun (1890/1924). Milan: Oemme Edizioni. ISBN 88-85822-11-8.
- Gauin, Maxime (2014). "The Missed Occasion: Successes of the Hamidian Police Against the Armenian Revolutionaries, 1905-1908" (PDF). Review of Armenian Studies (30): 113–131.
- Minassian, Gaïdz (2018). "The Armenian Revolutionary Federation and Operation 'Nejuik'". In Alloul, Houssine; Eldem, Edhem; de Smaele, Henk (eds.). To Kill a Sultan. London: Palgrave Macmillan. pp. 35–65. doi:10.1057/978-1-137-48932-6_2. ISBN 978-1-137-48931-9.
- Nalbandian, Louise (1975) [1963]. The Armenian Revolutionary Movement: The Development of Armenian Political Parties through the Nineteenth Century. University of California. ISBN 0-520-00914-2. LCCN 63-13806. OCLC 500605937.
- Ter Minassian, Anahide (1994). "The role of the Armenian community in the foundation and development of the socialist movement in the Ottoman Empire and Turkey - 1876-1923". In Tunçay, Mete; Zürcher, Erik Jan (eds.). Socialism and Nationalism in the Ottoman Empire, 1876-1923. New York: Palgrave Macmillan. pp. 109–156. ISBN 1-85043-787-4. OCLC 32130916.
- Van Ginderachter, Maarten (2018). "Edward Joris: Caught Between Continents and Ideologies?". In Alloul, Houssine; Eldem, Edhem; de Smaele, Henk (eds.). To Kill a Sultan. London: Palgrave Macmillan. pp. 67–97. doi:10.1057/978-1-137-48932-6_3. ISBN 978-1-137-48931-9.
- Walker, Christopher J. (1990) [1980]. Armenia: The Survival of a Nation (2nd ed.). Routledge. ISBN 0-415-04684-X.
- Yılmaz, İlkay (2017). "Propaganda by the Deed and Hotel Registration Regulations in the Late Ottoman Empire" (PDF). Journal of the Ottoman and Turkish Studies Association. 4 (1): 137–156. doi:10.2979/jottturstuass.4.1.08. ISSN 2376-0702. JSTOR 10.2979/jottturstuass.4.1.08.
