= Babadzhanian =

Babadzhanian (Armenian: Բաբաջանյան), is an Armenian surname. Notable people with the surname include:

- Arno Babadzhanian (1921–1983), Soviet composer and pianist
- Hamazasp Babadzhanian (1906–1977), Soviet Armenian Marshal of armored forces
