= Ruben Darbinyan =

Armenian politician

Ruben Darbinian
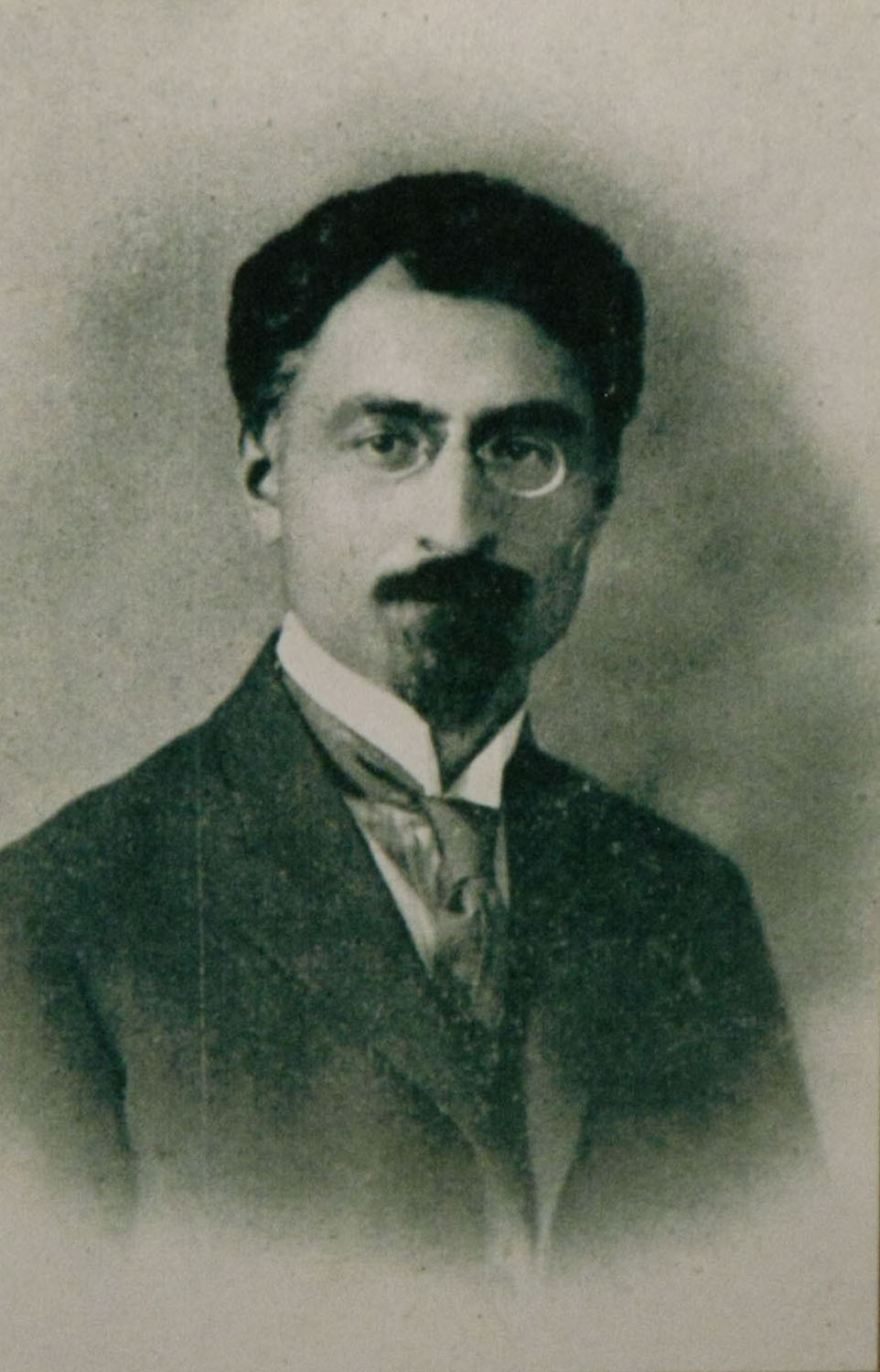

Minister of Justice of the First Republic of Armenia
- In office 24 January 1920 – 23 November 1920
- Prime Minister: Alexander Khatisian Hamo Ohanjanyan
- Preceded by: Abraham Gyulkhandanyan
- Succeeded by: Arsham Khondkaryan

Personal details
- Born: Artashes Chilingarian; 1883 Akhalkalaki, Russian Empire
- Died: 1968 (aged 84–85) Boston, Massachusetts, United States of America

Artashes Stepani Chilingarian (Armenian: Արտաշէս Ստեփանի Չիլինկարեան; 1883 – 1968), better known as Ruben Darbinian (Ռուբէն Դարբինեան), (Note: Also spelled Reuben.) was an Armenian politician, activist and writer. He was a member of the Armenian Revolutionary Federation (ARF) political party. In 1920, he served as the minister of justice of the First Republic of Armenia. He was also a renowned contributor to and editor of a number of Armenian publications in Tbilisi, Baku, and Boston.

== Biography ==
Artashes Chilingarian was born in 1883 in the town of Akhalkalaki, today in Georgia's southern region of Samtskhe–Javakheti, then a part of the Russian Empire. He attended Russian schools in Yekaterinodar (modern-day Krasnodar) in the North Caucasus and Armenian schools in his hometown. After completing his studies at the Russian Secondary School in Tiflis (Tbilisi), he continued his studies at universities in Heidelberg and Munich, eventually graduating from the faculty of law of the Imperial Moscow University in 1906.

Politically active in the Armenian Revolutionary Federation (ARF) from 1906, he contributed to a number of prominent Armenian publications like Mshak and Murch. He actively participated in the P’ot’orik (Storm) operation, whereby the ARF forcibly extracted financial contributions from wealthy Armenians. Pursued by the Russian authorities, he fled to Constantinople in 1909, where he wrote for the ARF newspaper Azatamart. In 1913, he moved to Germany. In order to avoid persecution, he acquired a passport under the name Ruben Darbinian. He used this name for the rest of his life. In Germany, he aided in the creation of the Armenian-German Society.

In 1914, he returned to the Caucasus and resided in Tiflis and Baku. He was editor of Arev in Baku from until 1916 and published the monthly Gorts starting in 1917. In 1917, he became the secretary of the Armenian National Council. In mid-1918, he was sent to Moscow by the Baku Armenian National Council to request Soviet assistance against the Ottoman invasion of the South Caucasus. He was prevented from leaving Moscow until the Bolshevik Sahak Ter-Gabrielyan interceded on his behalf in August 1919. While detained in Moscow, he translated textbooks for the Commissariat for Nationalities and Armenian prose and poetry for Maxim Gorky's universal literature project. While traveling back to the Caucasus, he witnessed the ravages of the Russian Civil War and became disillusioned with both sides of the conflict.

He served as minister of justice of the First Republic of Armenia (established in May 1918) from January to November 1920. Darbinian "gravitate[d] toward the hard-line stance of party [ARF] militants" during his tenure. As minister, he attempted to speed up the adoption of Armenian as the official language of the republic's judicial system. He oversaw the establishment of circuit courts in Kars and Alexandropol and proposed the creation of a Western Armenian judicial bureau in anticipation of the integration of the Western Armenian provinces into the Armenian republic. He was arrested soon after the establishment of communist rule. He escaped from prison during the February Uprising in 1921, when Soviet rule in Armenia was briefly overthrown. After the suppression of the rebellion, he moved to Tehran and later to the United States, where he resided in Boston and served as the editor of the ARF newspaper Hairenik. Darbinian took a strong anti-communist position and helped solidify the ARF's anti-Soviet orientation during the Cold War. He garnered controversy for his "tendency to paint all non-Dashnaks [non-ARF members] as stooges or even willing collaborators of the Soviet Union." He died in Boston in 1968.

== Criticism ==
Darbinian was criticised while being a chief editor of the Hairenik newspaper. The publication accused having sympathy to Nazism, Adolf Hitler, and "race worshipping".

== See also ==
- The Russian Threat
