= Abraham Gyulkhandanyan =

Armenian revolutionary, politician and historian

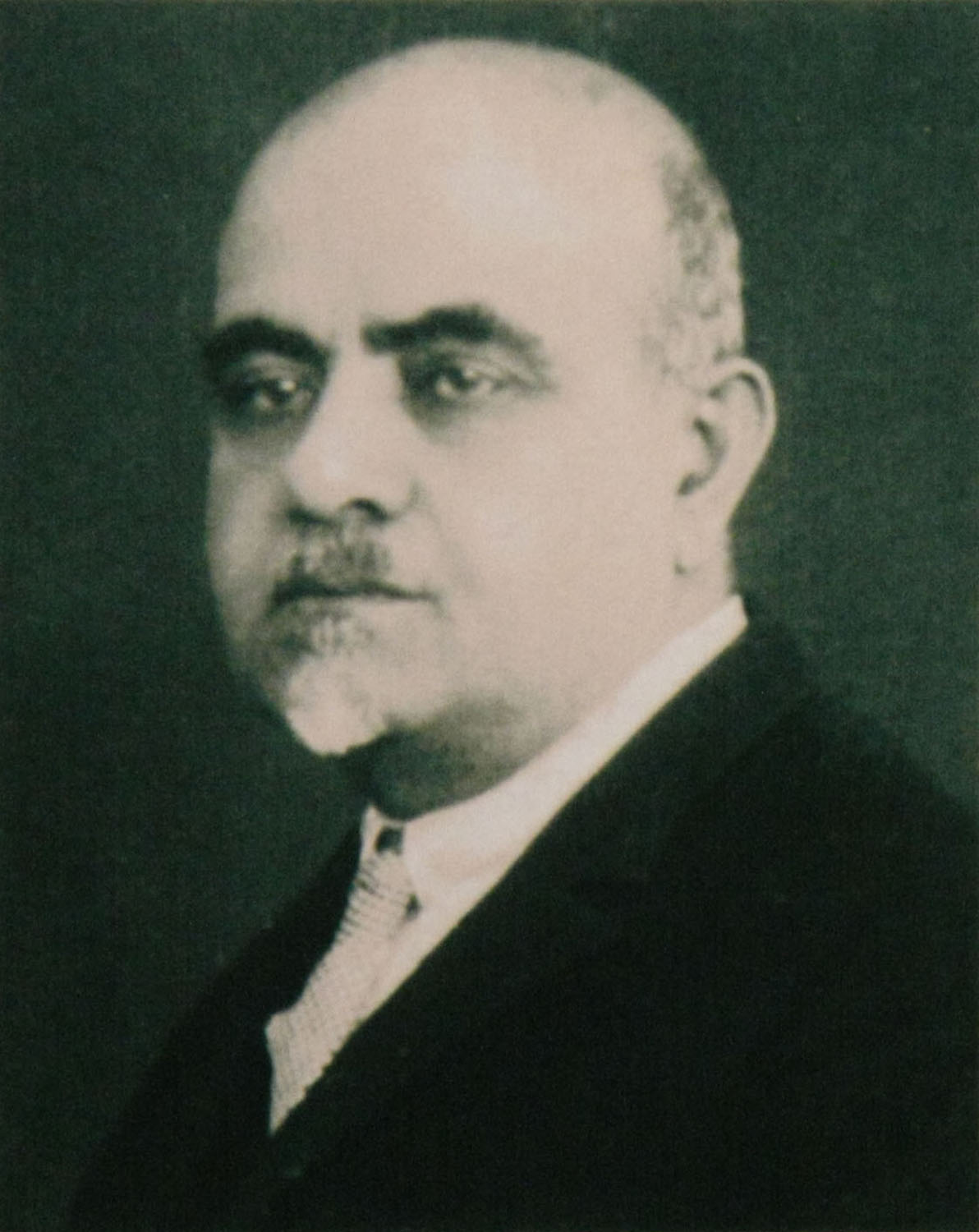

Minister of Interior of the First Republic of Armenia
- In office 10 August 1919 – May 1920
- Prime Minister: Alexander Khatisyan
- Preceded by: Sargis Manasyan
- Succeeded by: Ruben Ter-Minasian

Minister of Justice of the First Republic of Armenia
- In office 10 August 1919 – 10 September 1920
- Prime Minister: Alexander Khatisyan
- Preceded by: Samson Harutyunyan
- Succeeded by: Artashes Chilingaryan

Personal details
- Born: 1875 Etchmiadzin, Erivan Governorate, Russian Empire
- Died: 1 January 1946 (aged 70–71) Paris, France
- Education: Gevorgian Seminary
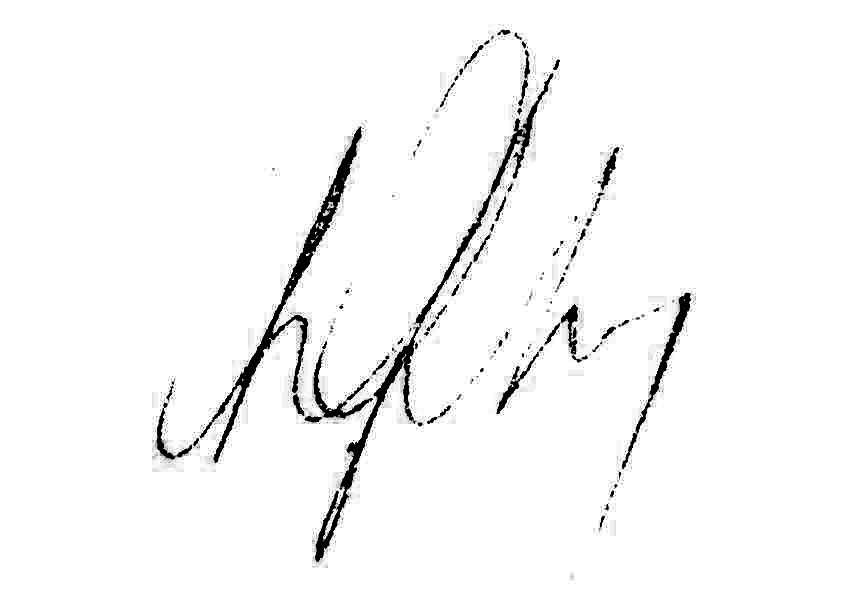
- Signature

Abraham Gyulkhandanyan (Note: Reformed orthography: Աբրահամ Գյուլխանդանյան. Also transcribed as Giulkhandanian, Gulkhandanian and Kiulkhandanian.) (Armenian: Աբրահամ Գիւլխանդանեան; 1875 – 1 January 1946) was an Armenian revolutionary, politician and historian who served as Minister of Justice, Minister of Interior and Minister of Finance of the First Republic of Armenia. He was member of Armenian Revolutionary Federation.

After the fall of the First Republic of Armenia, Gyulkhandanyan went into exile, eventually settling in Paris in 1933. During World War II, he became vice-president of the Armenisches Nationales Gremium (ANG/Armenian National Committee), which collaborated with Nazi German authorities against the Soviet Union.

== Biography ==
Gyulkhandanyan was born in Vagharshapat (Etchmiadzin) to a moderately prosperous Armenian family, and received his education at Etchmiadzin's Gevorgian Seminary. He joined the Armenian Revolutionary Federation at the age of 19 and moved to Baku, where he engaged in revolutionary activities.

In 1906, he was appointed editor of the ARF's Baku newspaper titled Groh (Mob). He used a number of pseudonyms, including Abro, Abramovich, Ruben and Sevian. He was arrested by the Imperial Russian authorities in 1910 and released two years later. Gyulkhandanyan was considered one of ARF's more socialist members, and was praised by other ARF leaders for his prowess as a revolutionary activist.

After his release from prison in 1912, Gyulkhandanyan attended the law school of the Demidov Lyceum in Yaroslavl․ Two years later he graduated and married his wife Haykanush, with whom he had a son, Ruben. Along with ARF founder Stepan Zorian, he organized the defense of Baku against the Turkish offensive in 1918. A member of the regional central committee from 1902 to 1908 and then of the party Bureau, he had campaigned against the right- and left-wing separatist movements in the party, led the defense council of Elisavetpol (modern-day Ganja) during the Armeno-Tatar clashes, and presided over the Armenian National Council at Baku. Still in his early forties in 1919, Gyulkhandanyan came to Yerevan as a formidable activist.

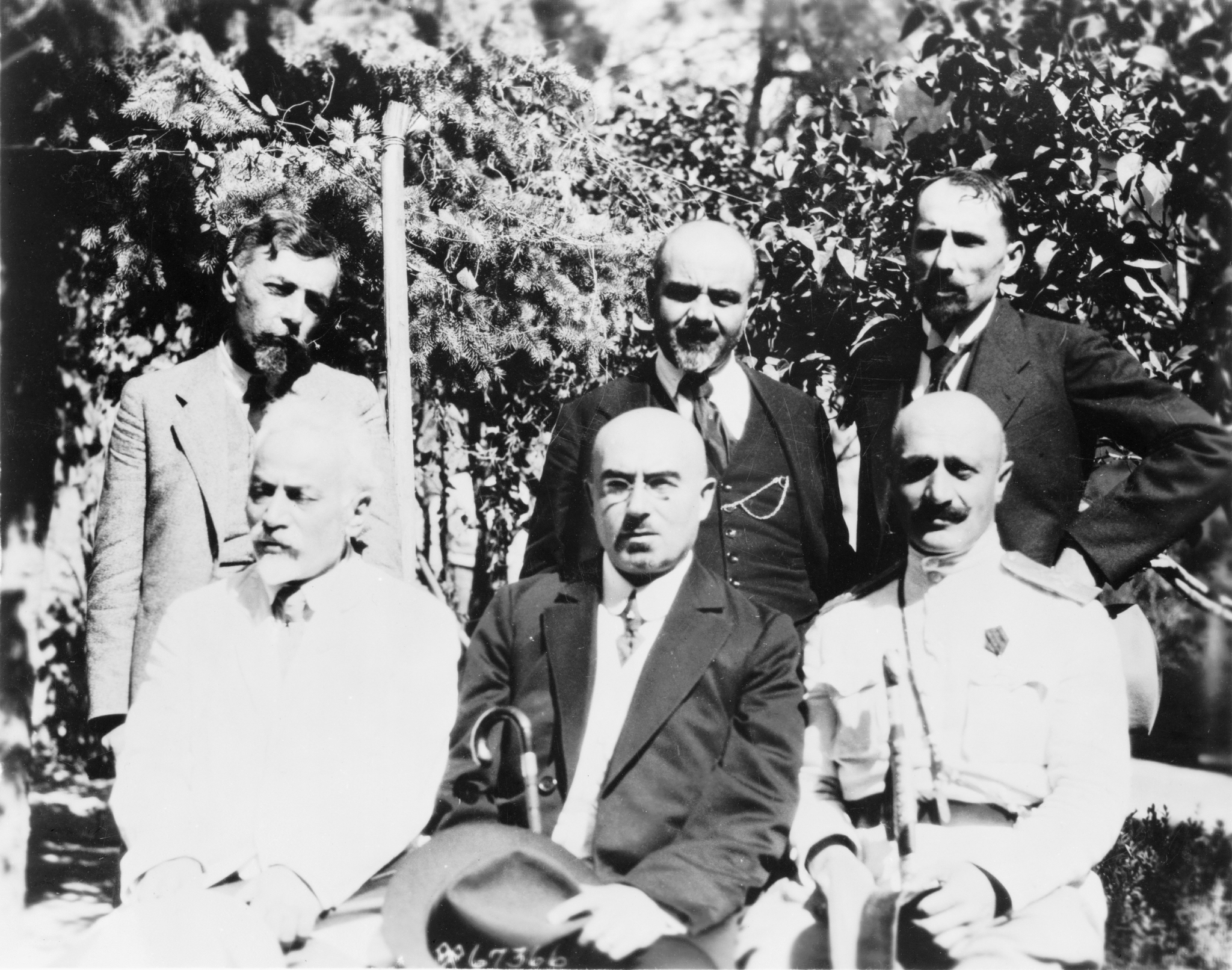
Gyulkhandanyan (standing, center) with other members of the second cabinet of the First Republic of Armenia, 1 October 1919

After the establishment of the First Republic of Armenia in May 1918, Gyulkhandanyan became a member of parliament and the ARF-led government, where he occupied the posts of Minister of Internal Affairs, Justice, and Finance. In December 1920, as the First Republic faced a double assault by Turkish and Soviet troops, Gyulkhandanyan was one of the delegates who signed the Treaty of Alexandropol with Turkey, which was never ratified but essentially realized a year later through the Treaty of Kars, albeit with less harsh territorial losses for Armenia.

After the Sovietization of Armenia, Gyulkhandanyan moved to Tiflis (Tbilisi), then Istanbul, then Bucharest before finally settling in Paris in 1933. While in exile, he wrote his memoirs and began to organize the ARF archives. During the Nazi occupation of Paris, he became the vice-president of the Armenian National Committee and editor of its organ Azat Hayastan (Free Armenia). He was arrested by French authorities after the liberation of France and was imprisoned for eleven months (October 1944 – September 1945) before being released for health reasons. He died of heart failure on 1 January 1946, a few months after his release.

== Works ==
- Ազգային շարժումների դրդապատճառները ԺԹ. դարում [Causes of national movements in the 19th century]. Paris: Imp. Araxes. 1939.
- Հայ-թաթարական ընդհարումները: Հատոր առաջին. Բագուի առաջին ընդհարումները [Armenian-Tatar clashes: vol. I, Baku’s first clashes]. Paris: Impr. franco-caucasienne. 1933.
- Բագուի դերը մեր ազատագրական շարժման մէջ [Baku’s role in our liberation movement]. Tehran: Alik. 1981.
- Կովկաս երկիրը, ժողովուրդը, պատմութիւնը: Քարտէզ եւ բազմաթիւ վիճակագրական տւեալներ [Caucasus: the country, the people, the history: Map and numerous statistical figures]. Paris: Librairie Universitaire J. Gamber.
- Հ. Յ. Դաշնակացութեան առաջին ծրագիրը եւ նրա հեղինակները [First program of the A. R. Federation and its authors]. Athens: H. H. Dashnaktsutiun Publishing House. 1987.
