= Zamozhne =

Zamozhne Заможне
- Village
- Location within Vinnytsia Oblast Location within Ukraine
- Coordinates: 49°1′34″N 27°43′38″E
- Country: Ukraine
- Oblast: Vinnytsia Oblast
- Raion: Zhmerynka Raion

Government
  - Village council: Skopchak Vasily

Area
  - Total: 3.039 km^{2} (1.173 sq mi)

Population (2015)
  - Total: 678
  - Density: 223.1/km^{2} (578/sq mi)
- Time zone: UTC+2 (EET)
  - Summer (DST): UTC+3 (EEST)
- Postal code: 23033
- Area code: +380-4341
- Website: Zamozhne

Zamozhne is a village in Ukraine, in Zhmerynka Raion of Vinnytsia Oblast. It has a population of 678, and the local government is the Voynashivska village council.
