= Hamazasp Babadzhanian =

Soviet Chief marshal of armored forces (1906–1977)

- Armenian: Համազասպ Բաբաջանյան; Russian: Амазасп Хачатурович Бабаджанян
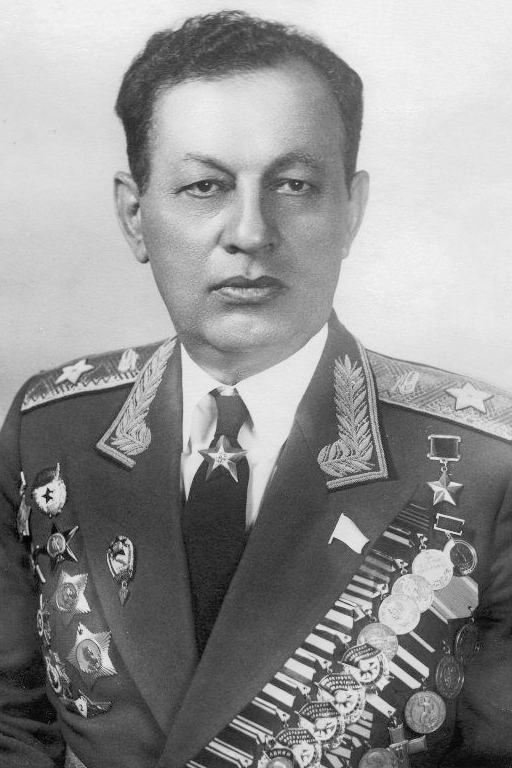
- Born: 18 February 1906; Khachisar, Elizavetpol Governorate, Russian Empire
- Died: 1 November 1977 (aged 71); Moscow, Soviet Union
- Burial place: Novodevichy Cemetery
- Military career
- Allegiance: Soviet Union
- Branch: Armored troops
- Service years: 1925–1977
- Rank: Chief Marshal of the Armoured Troops
- Commands: 3rd Mechanized Brigade; 20th Tank Brigade; 11th Guards Tank Corps; Odessa Military District; Armored Forces Academy
- Conflicts: World War II; Winter War; Operation Barbarossa; Battle of Moscow; Battle of Kursk; Lvov–Sandomierz Offensive; Vistula–Oder Offensive; Battle of Berlin; Hungarian Revolution of 1956
- Awards: Hero of the Soviet Union; Order of Lenin (4); Order of the Red Banner (4) see below

Hamazasp Khachaturi Babadzhanian or Babajanian (Armenian: Համազասպ Խաչատուրի Բաբաջանյան; Russian: Амазасп Хачатурович Бабаджанян, romanized: Amazasp Khachaturovich Babadzhanyan; 18 February 1906 – 1 November 1977) was a Soviet military officer of Armenian origin who held the rank of Chief Marshal of the Armoured Troops. He was a recipient of the Hero of the Soviet Union (1944).

== Biography ==
=== Early life ===
Babadzhanian was born into an Armenian family in the village of Chardakhlu (Khachisar) near Yelizavetpol (later Kirovabad, now Ganja, Azerbaijan), then part of the Russian Empire. Ivan Bagramyan, a fellow Armenian who would also go on to become a Marshal of the Soviet Union, was born in the same village. Babadzhanian attended the local, four-year primary school in Çardaqlı before moving to Tiflis (Tbilisi) in 1915 to continue his education at an Armenian secondary school there. His family, however, was unable to support him financially for long and he was forced to return to home, where he went to work in the fields.

In 1925, Babadzhanian applied to the Red Army's Aleksandr Myasnikian Combined Military School in Yerevan, Armenia. The school was later relocated to Tbilisi and renamed the Transcaucasus Combined Infantry School, and he graduated from there as an officer in 1929. He was given various postings throughout the Soviet Union, serving as a commander of a battalion and later as a deputy for the army corps based in the Transcaucasian Military District. Babadzhanian rounded out his studies at the Frunze Military Academy in 1937, attaining the rank of major. In 1938 he was appointed as deputy of the commander of a regiment in Leningrad before being sent to the front following the outbreak of the Finno-Soviet Winter War in 1939–1940. He served with distinction in the fighting and was later given command of the 751st Rifle Regiment, based in the North Caucasus Military District.

=== World War II ===
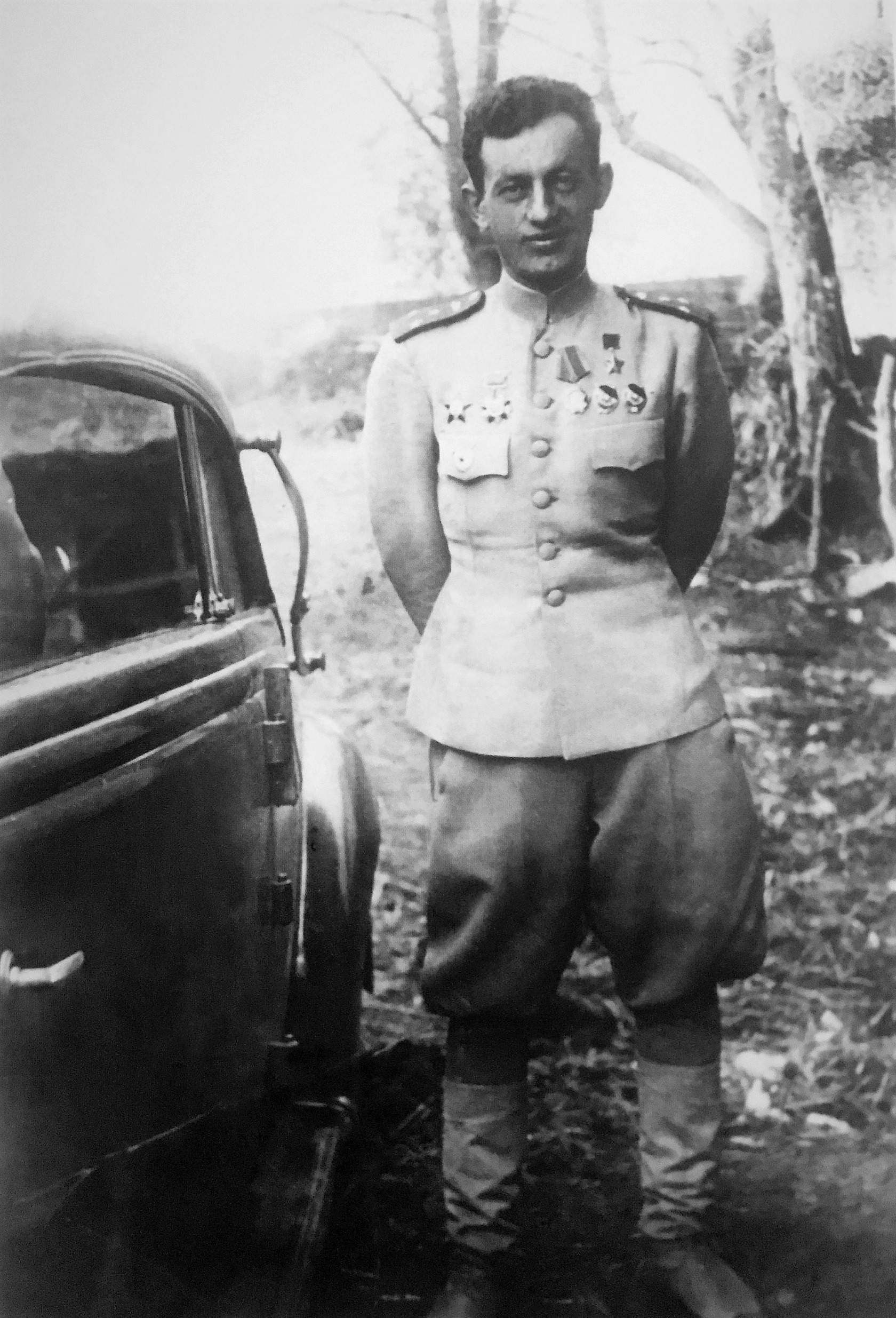
Babadzhanian as the commander of 20th Guards Mechanized Brigade

On 5 July, a few weeks following Germany's invasion of the Soviet Union, Babadzhanian was dispatched to Smolensk, where he assumed command of the 395th Rifle Regiment, 127th Rifle Division. His unit was involved in a rearguard action during a temporary Soviet retreat, putting up stiff resistance against Axis forces before turning once again to the offensive. His unit was the first to re-enter the city of Yelnya on 8 September 1941, an achievement that earned it a period of respite from the fighting. After a short rest and refit in Kursk, fighting soon enveloped that part of RSFSR and Babadzhanian's regiment engaged Axis forces in Fatezh and assisted in the evacuation of Kursk.

Over the course of 1942, Babadzhanian's unit increasingly took part in offensive operations. In the winter of 1941–42, his division was sent to the southwestern front. In January, he was ordered to attack and capture German positions in the village of Sokolia Plota. Reconnaissance revealed that the Germans had concentrated there a force six times larger than his, a fact that forced him to launch an attack that would strike it on the flanks. His maneuver was successful in driving a wedge between the defending forces, which suffered heavy casualties and withdrew from their positions. His regiment went on to capture the village of Vipolzovo and Shumakovo Station, the beginning terminus to the Kursk-Belgorod railway line, and drove deep into the region of Sedvenskiyi, south-east of Kursk. In September 1942, he was made commander the 3rd Mechanized Brigade, part of the Third Mechanized Corps.

In July 1943, Babadzhanian's was sent north to take part in the Battle of Kursk. He was given command of the 20th Tank Brigade, which at the time was part of the Soviet Guards 8th Mechanized Corps. His brigade was tasked with blocking the Germans' northern and southern advances toward Kursk by taking up position at an intersection near Oboyan. The brigade sustained heavy losses from German armor assaults, and Babadzhanian himself was wounded during the course of the attacks. He rapidly recovered from his injuries and returned to active duty. His unit was incorporated into the 1st Ukrainian Front and sent once more to take part in the struggle to evict the Axis out of Ukraine. Over the course of the winter of 1943-44 Babadzhanian's brigade participated in the liberation of the towns and villages of Vinnytsia, Zhmerynka, and Ternopil. The tanks under Babadzhanian's command distinguished themselves in particular in the battle of Koziatyn, which resulted in the annihilation of the German 70th Motorized Rifle Division.

In March 1944, Babadzhanian led his brigade across the Dniester in a drive to retake the town of Stanislav. After even days of heavy fighting his forces took and occupied the right bank of the river. For its efforts, the commanders of the 8th Mechanized Corps on 2 April conferred upon Babadzhanian the title of Hero of the Soviet Union. From the summer of 1944 until 1945, his forces fought as part of the 1st and 2nd Belorussian Fronts. On 25 August 1944 Babadzhanian, then a lieutenant colonel, was made commander of the 11th Guards Tank Corps, part of the 1st Guards Tank Army.

In January 1945, as part of the Vistula–Oder offensive, his armor provided heavy fire support for the units advancing into Poland, where they reduced the fortresses guarding the inner approaches into the country, and helped them in the capture of the cities of Łódź, Kutno, and Poznań. By the end of the month, Babadzhanian's corps had reached the borders of Germany and begun military operations to take Landsberg, Tczew, Wejherowo, and a host of other towns in Pomerania. As part of the 1st Belorussian Front, on 2 February the 11th Tank Corps crossed the Oder and, with artillery and air support, and took part in the capture of Frankfurt an der Oder. His forces arrived in time to take part in the battle for Berlin, fighting in heavy street battles, alongside units of the 1st Ukrainian Front, and participating in the seizure of the Reichstag.

=== Later career ===
On 11 July 1945 Babadzhanian was promoted to major general in the Soviet tank forces. He graduated from the Military Academy of the General Staff in 1948, and was appointed to responsible command positions. Babadzhanian served as the 1st Deputy Commander of the Carpathian Military District from 1950 to 1951.

In November 1956, Babadzhanian led the 8th Mechanized Army to Budapest, during the Soviet intervention that led to the crushing of the Hungarian Revolution of 1956. From 1959, he was commander-in-chief of the forces in the Odessa Military District. From 1967 to 1969, he was the head of the Rodion Malinovsky Military Academy of Armored Forces and from May 1969, chief of the tank forces. Babadzhanian was a deputy of the Soviet of Nationalities during its sixth and seventh convocations, representing the Moldavian SSR. From 1969 to 1977, he was head of armored forces of the Soviet Army. Babadzhanian became Chief Marshal of the Tank and Armored Troops on 29 April 1975 (one of only two men to attain this rank) and held the position until his death.

He died in Moscow on 1 November 1977, and was buried with full honors at the Novodevichy Cemetery.

== Memory ==
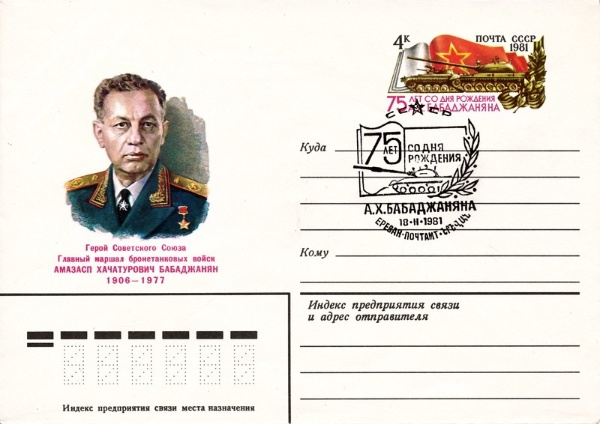
1981 Soviet postal cover featuring portrait of Babadzhanian

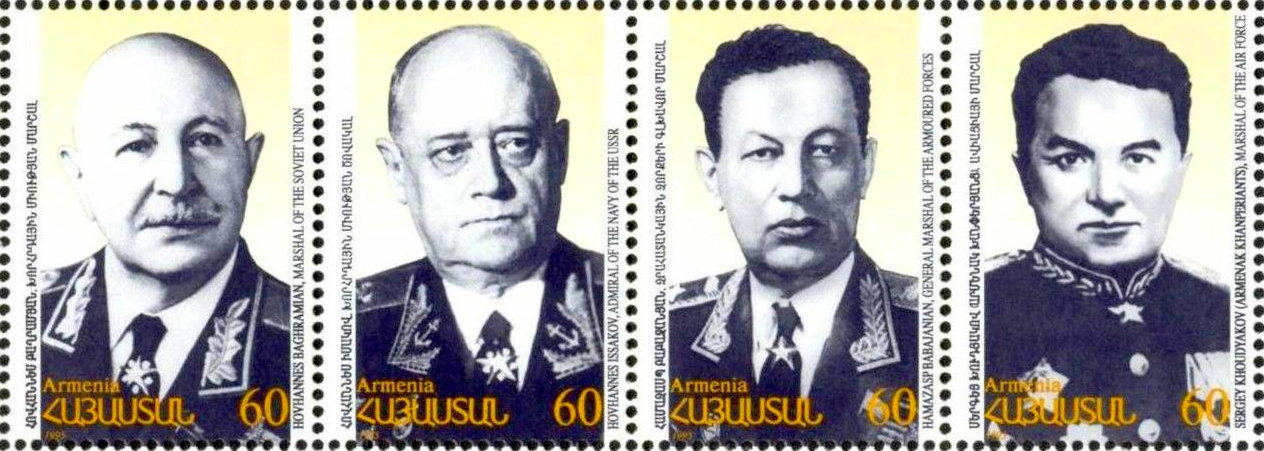
World War II Armenian marshals stamps: Bagramyan, Isakov, Babadzhanian, Khudyakov

In 1978, an area in the North-Western Administrative District of Moscow was named after Babadzhanian. One of the streets in Yerevan is named after Babadzhanian. A street in Odessa was renamed the Marshal Babadzhanian Street on 22 December 2012.

On 23 May 2016, a monumental statue of Marshal Hamazasp Babadzhanian was erected in the Armenian capital Yerevan on a street bearing his name.

== Published works ==
- (in Russian) Дороги Победы [The Road to Victory]. Moscow: Molodaia Gvardiia, 1972.
- (in Russian) Tанки и Tанковые Войска [Tanks and Tank Forces]. Moscow: Voenizdat, 1970.

== Awards and honors ==
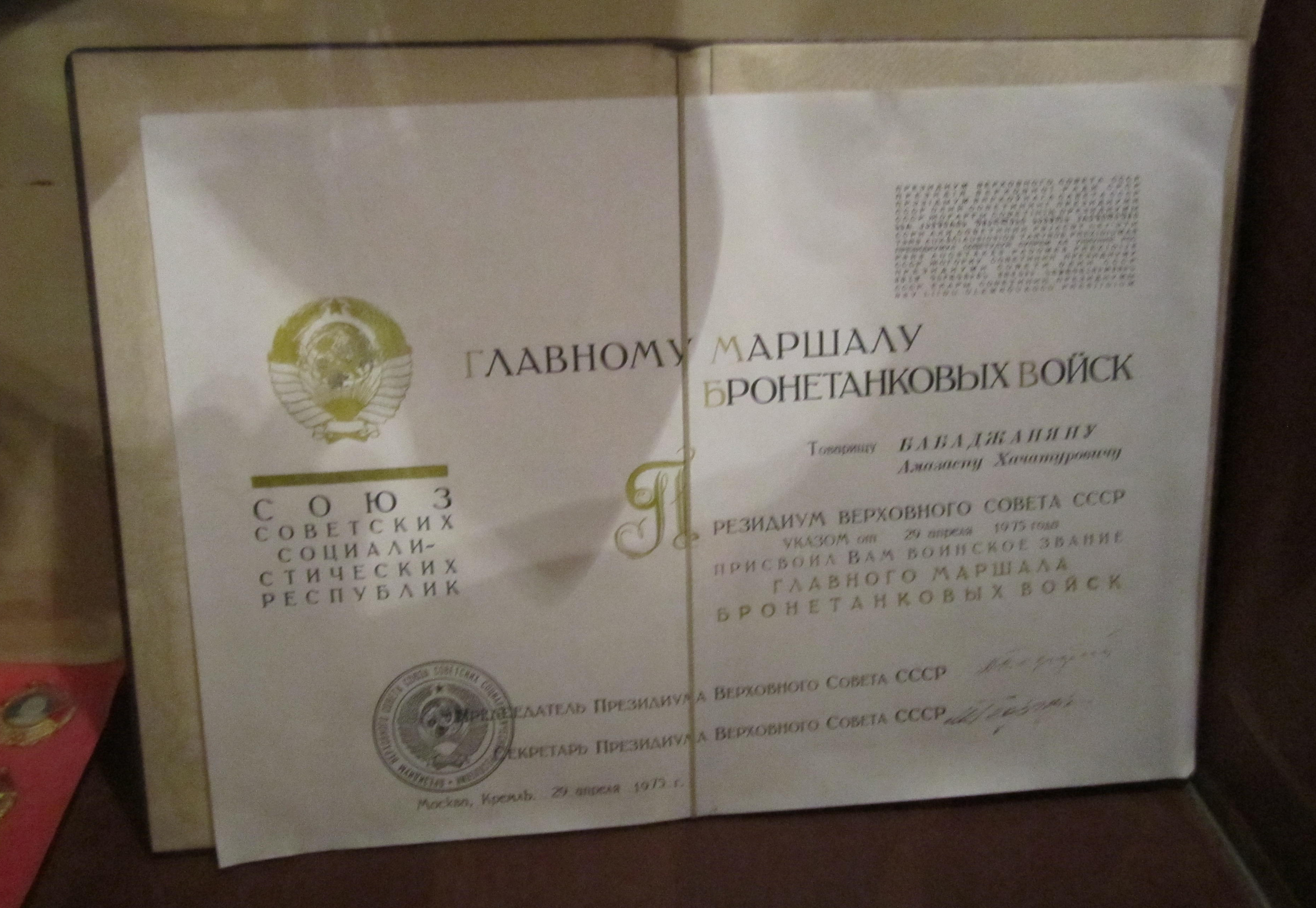
Certificate of Honor from the Presidium of the Supreme Soviet of the USSR dedicated to the title Chief marshal of the Armored Troops to Babadzhanian. Military-historical museum of the Ministry of Defense of Armenia “Mother Armenia”

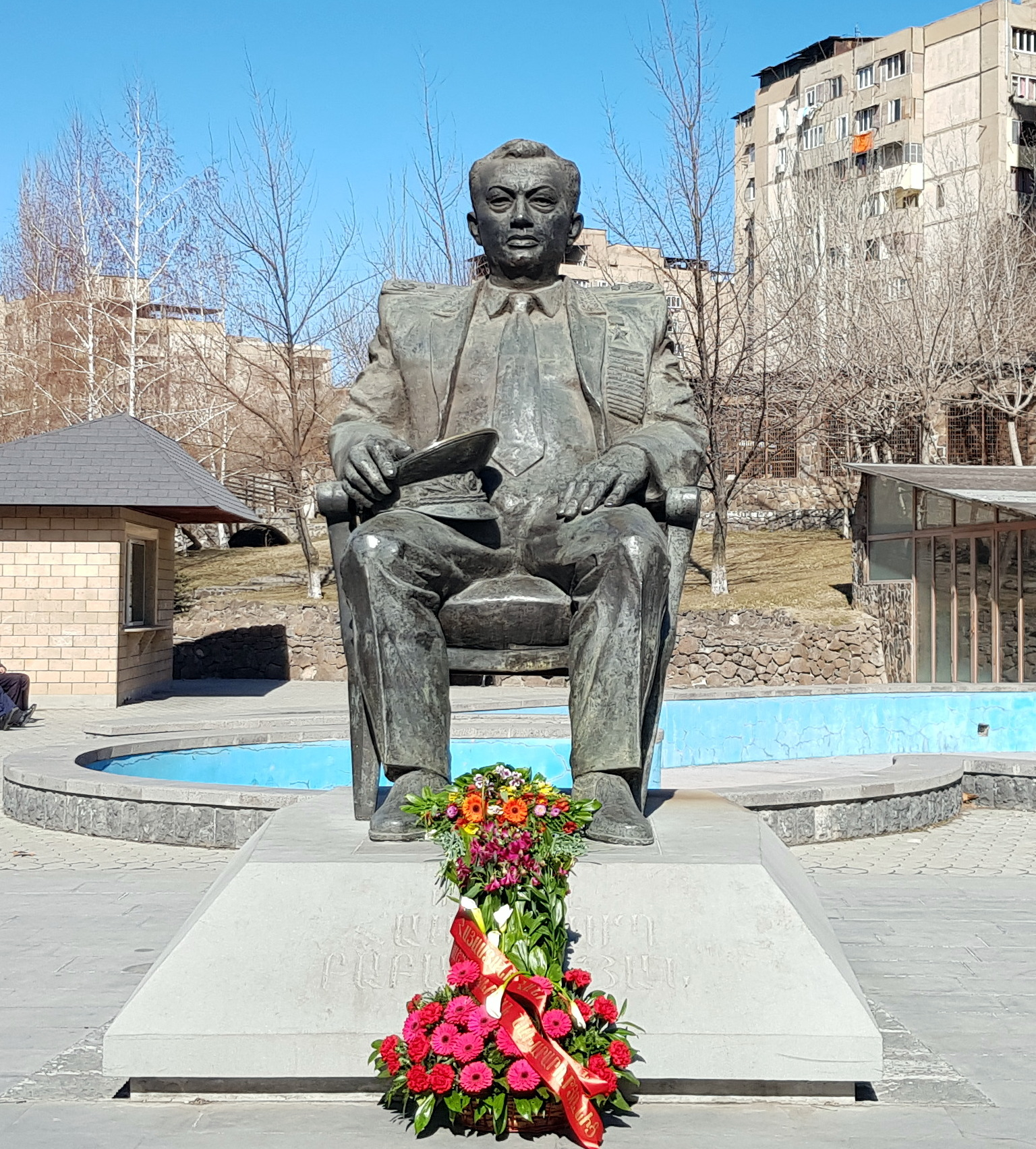
Statue honoring Marshal Babadzhanian in Avan district of Yerevan

USSR

Hero of the Soviet Union (No. 2077 - 26 April 1944)
Order of Lenin, four times (26 April 1944, 15 November 1950, 17 February 1966, 15 September 1976)
Order of the October Revolution (4 May 1972)
Order of the Red Banner, four times (17 February 1942, 13 June 1943, 11 June 1945, 30 December 1956)
Order of Suvorov, 1st class (29 May 1945)
Order of Suvorov, 2nd class (6 April 1945)
Order of Kutuzov, 1st class (18 December 1956)
Order of the Patriotic War, 1st class (1 March 1944)
Order of the Red Star, twice (24 June 1943, 3 November 1944)
Order "For Service to the Homeland in the Armed Forces of the USSR", 3rd degree (1975)
Medal "For the Defence of Moscow" (1944)
Medal "For the Liberation of Warsaw" (1945)
Medal "For the Capture of Berlin" (1945)
Medal "For the Victory over Germany in the Great Patriotic War 1941–1945" (1945)
Jubilee Medal "Twenty Years of Victory in the Great Patriotic War 1941-1945" (1965)
Jubilee Medal "Thirty Years of Victory in the Great Patriotic War 1941–1945" (1975)
Jubilee Medal "In Commemoration of the 100th Anniversary of the Birth of Vladimir Ilyich Lenin" (1969)
Jubilee Medal "30 Years of the Soviet Army and Navy" (1948)
Jubilee Medal "40 Years of the Armed Forces of the USSR" (1958)
Jubilee Medal "50 Years of the Armed Forces of the USSR" (1968)
Medal "Veteran of the Armed Forces of the USSR" (1976)
Medal "For the Development of Virgin Lands" (1956)

- Wound stripe

Foreign

Order of 9 September 1944, 1st class (Bulgaria)
Medal “For Strengthening Friendship in Arms”, Golden class (Czechoslovakia)
Order of Karl Marx (East Germany)
Silver Cross of the Virtuti Militari (Poland)
Officer's Cross of the Order of Polonia Restituta (Poland)
Order of the Cross of Grunwald, 3rd class (Poland)
Brotherhood of Arms Medal (Poland)
Medal for Warsaw 1939–1945 (Poland)
Medal "For Oder, Neisse and the Baltic" (Poland)
Order of the Red Banner (Mongolia)
Medal "30 Years of the Victory in Khalkhin-Gol" (Mongolia)
Medal "40 Years of the Victory in Khalkhin-Gol" (Mongolia)
Medal "50 Years of the Mongolian People's Revolution" (Mongolia)
Medal "30 Years of Victory over Militaristic Japan" (Mongolia)
Medal "50 Years of the Mongolian People's Army" (Mongolia)

Honorary Citizen

- Yelnya, Russia (1970)
- Zalishchyky, Ukraine
- Gdynia, Poland (1972-2004). (Note: Babadzhanian's honorary citizenship of Gdynia was rescinded, following a unanimous vote by Gdynia's city council in 2004.)
