= Çardaqlı, Shamkir =

Çənlibel Çardaqlı • Չարդախլու
- Location within Azerbaijan
- Coordinates: 40°45′05″N 45°52′27″E
- Country: Azerbaijan
- District: Shamkir
- Time zone: UTC+4 (AZT)

Çənlibel, formerly known as Çardaqlı (alternatively anglicized as Chardakhli or Chardagly; Armenian: Չարդախլու, romanized: Chardakhlu) also Khachisar (Armenian: Խաչիսար) is a village in the Shamkir District of Azerbaijan.

The village had an Armenian population before the outbreak of the Nagorno-Karabakh conflict. All of the Armenians left the village during the Nagorno-Karabakh conflict and settled in Zorakan in Armenia. The village has since been repopulated by Azerbaijani refugees from Armenia.

== History ==
During the Russian Empire, Çardaqlı was an Armenian village in the Elizavetpol uezd of the Elizavetpol Governorate. According to the 1910 publication of the Caucasian Calendar, the village then known as Chardakhly (Чардахлы) had a mainly Armenian population of 2,400 in 1908.

=== During World War II ===
The village is known as the birthplace of marshal of the Soviet Union, Hamazasp Babadzhanian, who was also awarded the title of Hero of the Soviet Union. According to Babadzhanian, 1,100 of his fellow villagers participated in the Great Patriotic War, 136 of them became lieutenants, senior lieutenants and captains, 30 - majors, 3 - colonels and 4 - generals. Ivan Bagramian, who was a Marshal of the Soviet Union and twice awarded Hero of the Soviet Union, was born in Yelisavetpol (modern-day Ganja) to parents from Çardaqlı.

=== Deportation of the Armenian population ===
In September–October 1987 the first secretary of the Shamkir District district committee of the Communist Party of Azerbaijan M. Asadov came into conflict with the population of the village in connection with their protests against the dismissal of the Armenian director of the local sovkhoz, and his replacement with an Azerbaijani. Villagers were beaten up by the police after protesting against the replacement of an Armenian farm director with an Azeri one. This is considered to be the first violent event of the Nagorno-Karabakh conflict. In connection with this, a protest broke out in Yerevan. At the end of November 1988 all Armenians living in Çardaqlı were expelled from their native village.

In 1990, the village was renamed Chanlibel (Azerbaijani: Çənlibel).

== Notable people ==
- Hamazasp Babadzhanian
- Hovhannes Bagramyan
- Sargis Manasyan
