= Harutyun Chmshkyan =

Minister of Justice of the First Republic of Armenia
- In office 27 April 1919 – 10 August 1919
- Prime Minister: Hovhannes Katchaznouni Alexander Khatisyan
- Preceded by: Samson Harutyunyan
- Succeeded by: Arsham Khondkaryan

Harutyun Chmshkyan (Armenian: Հարություն Չմշկյան) was an Armenian politician who served as Minister of Justice of the First Republic of Armenia in 1919.
