= Valeriy Brezdenyuk =

Ukrainian painter (1963–2014)

Hero of Ukraine Valeriy Brezdenyuk
- Валерій Брезденюк
- Born: 17 June 1963; Zhmerynka, Ukrainian SSR, Soviet Union
- Died: 18 February 2014 (aged 50); Kyiv, Ukraine
- Cause of death: Gunshot wound to the back (during Euromaidan)
- Known for: Paper marbling, Heavenly Hundred

Valeriy Oleksandrovych Brezdenyuk (Ukrainian: Валерій Олександрович Брезденюк; 17 June 1963 – 18 February 2014) was a Ukrainian painter from Zhmerynka, Vinnytska Oblast, practicing paper marbling. He was killed during Euromaidan.

== Biography ==
Brezdenyuk was an entrepreneur and owner of an internet cafe in the center of Zhmerynka. He was a painter practicing paper marbling Turkish ebru style. In 2013, Brezdenyuk was a finalist on "Ukraine's Got Talent" after winning his hometown's "Zhmerynka's got talent" contest.

He died on February 18, 2014, in Kyiv during the Euromaidan clashes with the police. He was shot in the back. Valeriy Brezdenyuk entered "UDAR" party in a few months before his death.

== Awards ==
- Hero of Ukraine with the Order of the Golden Star (November 21, 2014, posthumously)
