= Sargis Manasyan =

Armenian politician (died 1920)

- Սարգիս Մանասյան
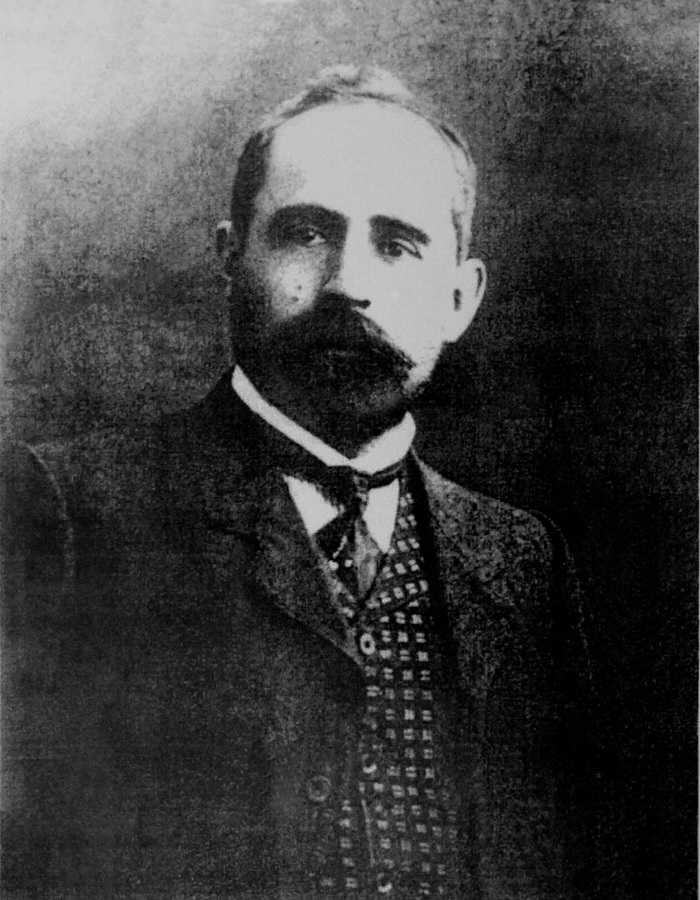
- Portrait of Manasyan

Minister of Interior of the First Republic of Armenia (Acting)
- In office April 27, 1919 – August 10, 1919
- Prime Minister: Hovhannes Katchaznouni Alexander Khatisyan
- Preceded by: Alexander Khatisian
- Succeeded by: Abraham Gyulkhandanyan

Personal details
- Born: Unknown

Sargis Manasyan (Armenian: Սարգիս Մանասյան, d. 1920) was an Armenian politician who served as acting Minister of Interior of First Republic of Armenia in 1919.

== Early life ==
Manasyan was born in the village of Çardaqlı, Shamkir, in what is now modern day Azerbaijan. His exact date of birth is unknown, although he is presumed to have been born in 1880. He received his higher education in Tbilisi, Georgia, where he would later be called as a teacher.

== Political career ==
Manasyan was an active participant in the Armenian national movement and joined the Armenian volunteer units during World War I. He would eventually be elected as acting Minister of Interior in the First Republic of Armenia, as a member of the Armenian Revolutionary Federation party.

== Death ==
Manasyan is alleged to have died in 1920, when he was sent as a plenipotentiary envoy to Ijevan to resolve uprisings relating to Bolsheviks. He was then taken captive and sent to Baku, where after a short period of torture and interrogation, he was shot and his body was thrown into the Caspian Sea.
