= Arsham Khondkaryan =

Armenian politician

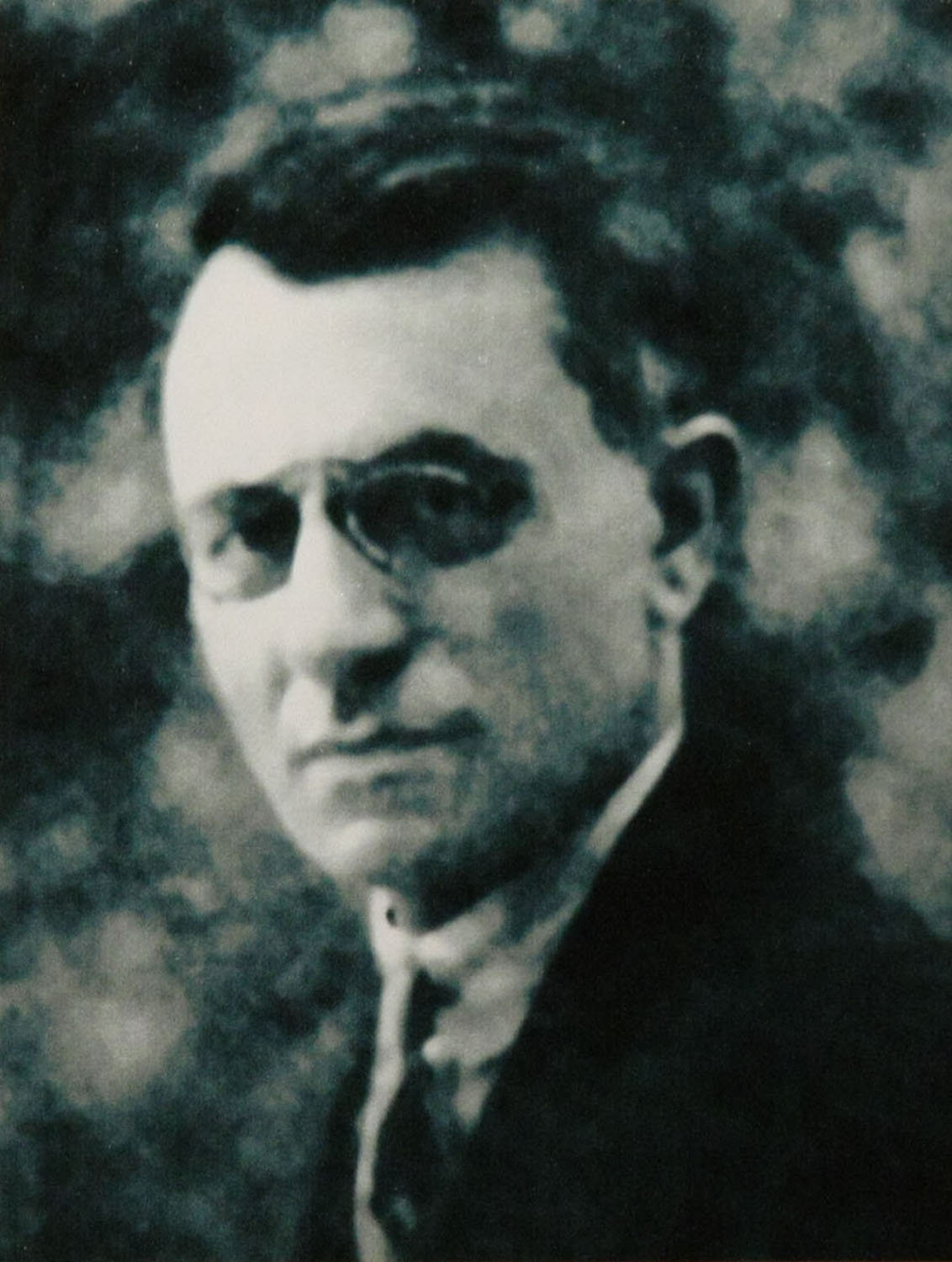

Minister of Justice of the First Republic of Armenia
- In office ?–?
- Prime Minister: ?
- Preceded by: Harutyun Chmshkyan
- Succeeded by: Artashes Chilingaryan

Minister of Communication of the First Republic of Armenia
- In office 25 November 1920 – 2 December 1920
- Prime Minister: Simon Vratsyan
- Preceded by: Arshak Jamalyan
- Succeeded by: ?

Personal details
- Born: July 1881 Hakveyis, Surmalu uezd, Erivan Governorate, Russian Empire (present-day Iğdır, Turkey)
- Died: December 1, 1965 (aged 84) Paris

Arsham Khondkaryan (Armenian: Արշամ Խոնդկարյան) was an Armenian politician who served as Minister of Justice of the First Republic of Armenia.
