= The Russian Threat =

1920 book by Ruben Darbinyan

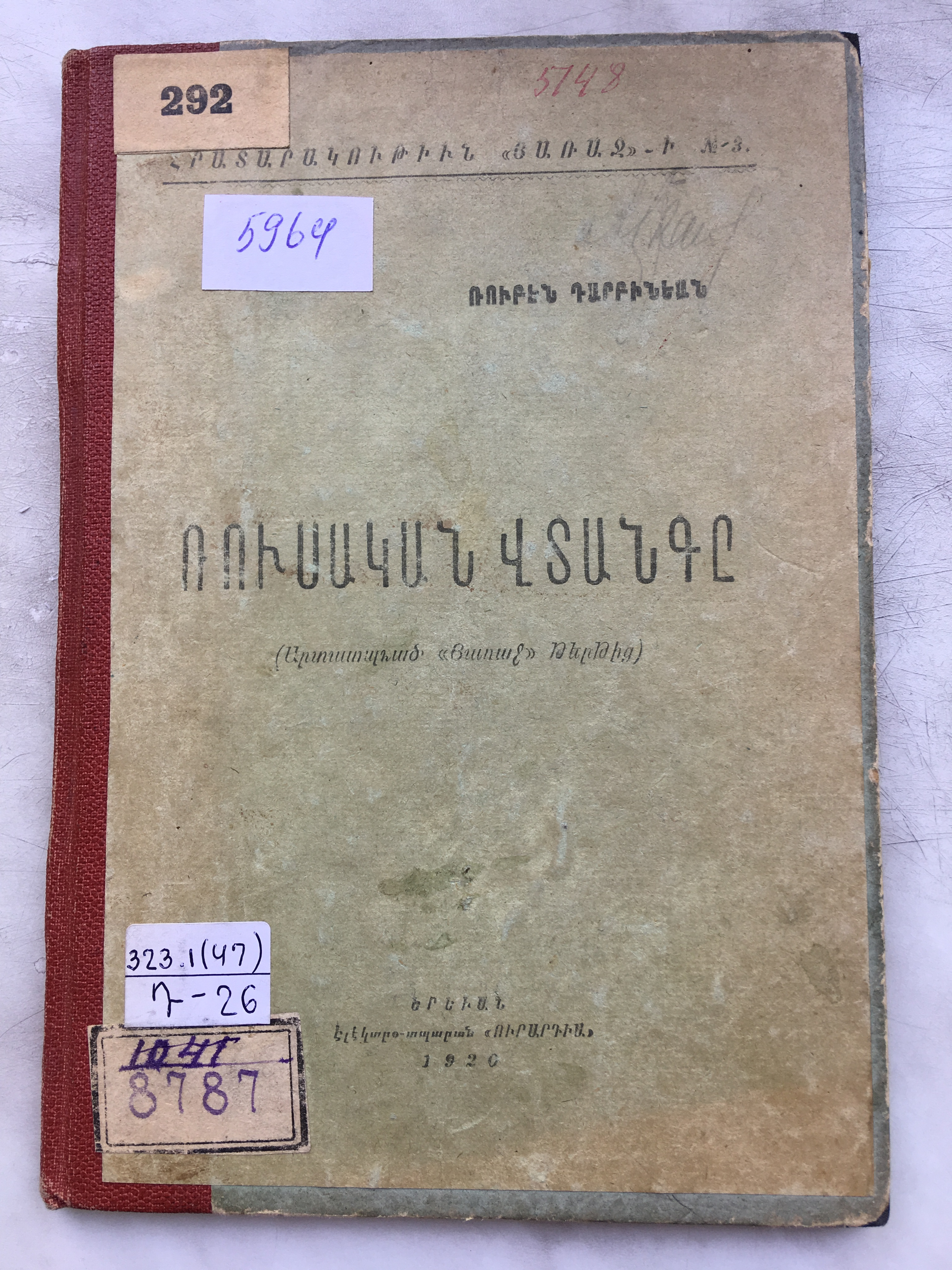
- Author: Ruben Darbinyan
- Language: Armenian
- Genre: Political philosophy
- Publisher: Urardia Publishing House
- Publication date: 1920
- Publication place: Armenia
- Text: The Russian Threat at Wikisource

The Russian Threat (Armenian: Ռուսական վտանգը) (1920) is one of the major works of Armenian politician Ruben Darbinyan in the genre of political philosophy. The book was published in 1920 in the First Republic of Armenia and republished in 1991 in newly independent Armenia by the Azat Khosk (Ազատ խոսք) publishing house.

== History ==
The book was written by the acting Minister of Justice of the First Republic of Armenia Ruben Darbinyan from 9 June to 8 July 1920 under the threat of return of Russia to Transcaucasia, when in April 1920 the Sovietization of Azerbaijan was carried out, followed by the May Uprising in Armenia. The text of the future book was published in Yerevan from 9 June to 8 July 1920 in the Araj Daily (Յառաջ) entitled as "On the Russian Front (Revaluation)" (Armenian: "Ռուսական ճակատի վրա (վերագնահատումներ)). Subsequently, the articles from the newspaper were collected in a single collection, published in the form of the book.

== Contents ==
The book consists of 12 parts:

- I. Two fronts (I. Երկու ճակատ)
- II. Mongolian and Slavic elements (II. Մոնղոլական և սլավոնական տարերքը)
- III. Duality and illness of the Russian spirit (III. Ռուսական ոգու երկությունը և հիվանդությունը)
- IV. Nation-denying spirit and perversion (IV. Ազգամերժ ոգին և այլասերումը)
- V. Theocratic state and non-national mentality (V. Թեոկրատիկ պետությունը և ապազգային մտայնությունը)
- VI. Freedom of the person and nationality (VI. Անհատի ազատությունը և ազգությունը)
- VII. Language (VII. Լեզուն)
- VIII. Socialist psychosis and anti-national tendency (VIII. Սոցիալիստական պսիխոզը և հակազգային տենդենցը)
- IX. National distortion and development of political thought (IX. Ազգային այլասերումը և քաղաքական մտքի զարգացումը)
- X. Russophilia (X. Ռուսասիրությունը)
- XI. Russian imperialism and its manifestations (XI. Ռուսական կայսերապաշտությունը և նրա արտահայտումները)
- XII. Yesterday and Today (XII. Երեկ և այսօր)

== See also ==
- Anti-Russian sentiment
