= Zorakan =

Village in Tavush, Armenia

Zorakan Զորական
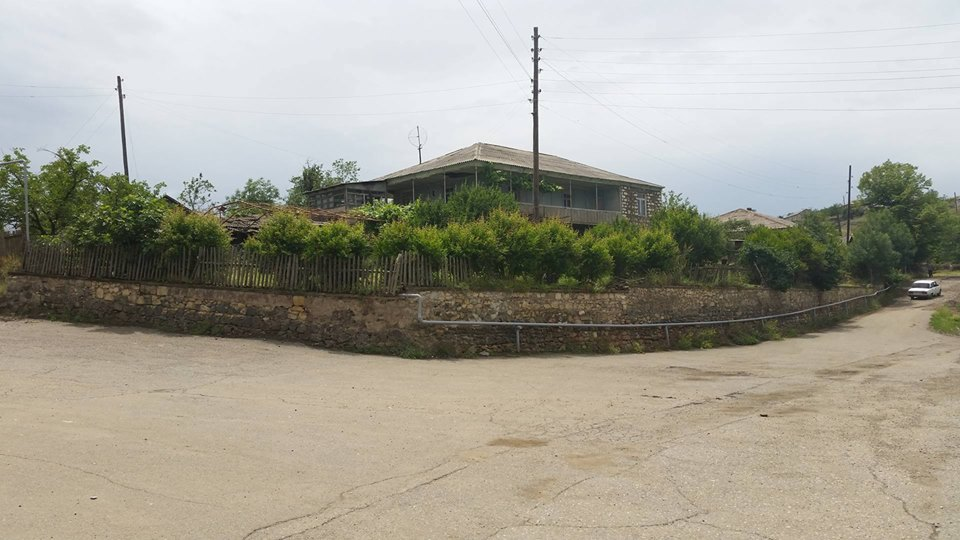

- Location within Armenia Location within Tavush
- Coordinates: 41°13′N 44°56′E
- Country: Armenia
- Province: Tavush
- Municipality: Noyemberyan

Population (2011)
  - Total: 891
- Time zone: UTC+4 (AMT)

Zorakan (Armenian: Զորական) is a village in the Noyemberyan Municipality of the Tavush Province of Armenia. The village is inhabited by over a hundred families of Armenian refugees from the village of Çardaqlı in Azerbaijan.

== Gallery ==
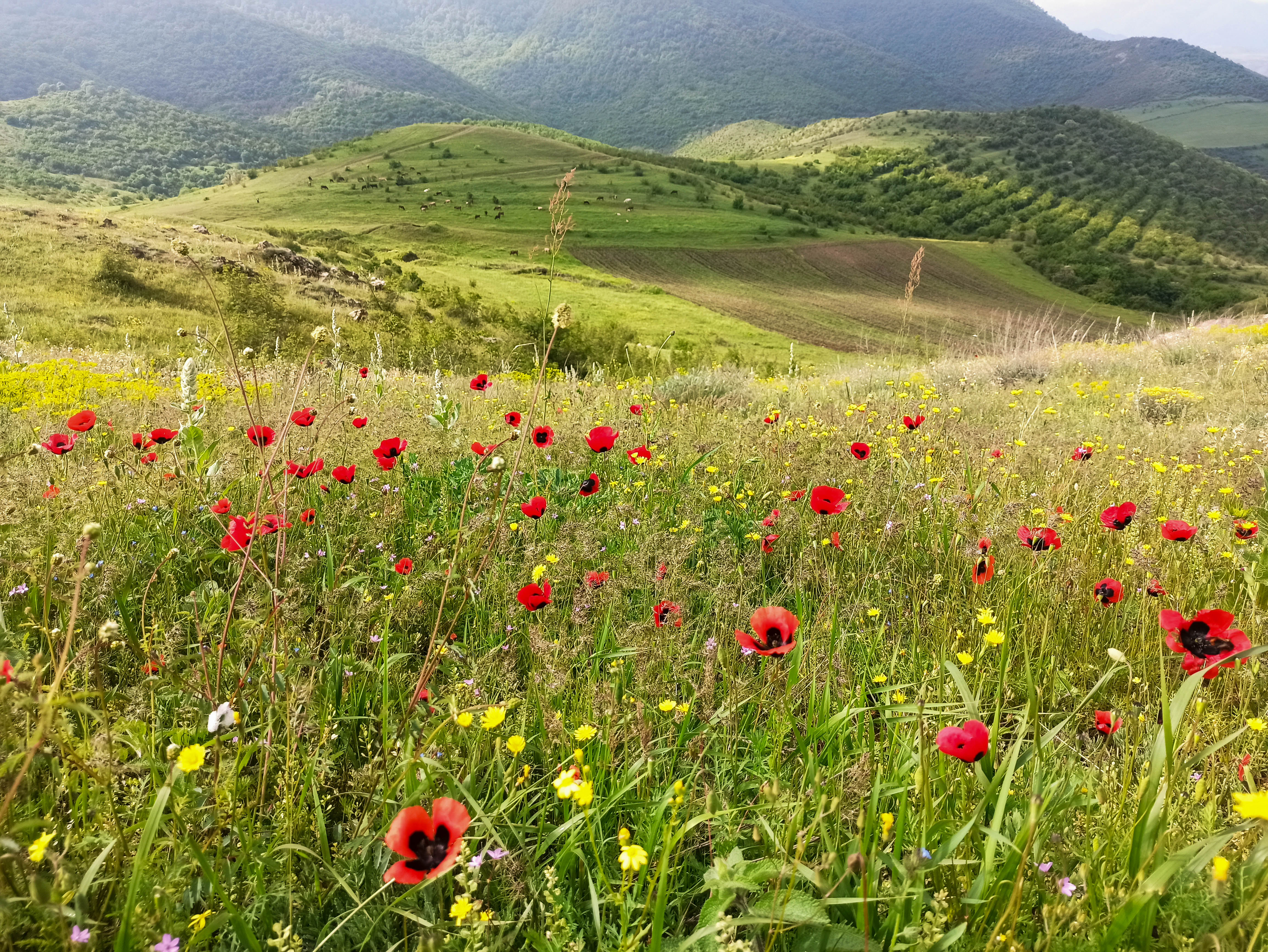

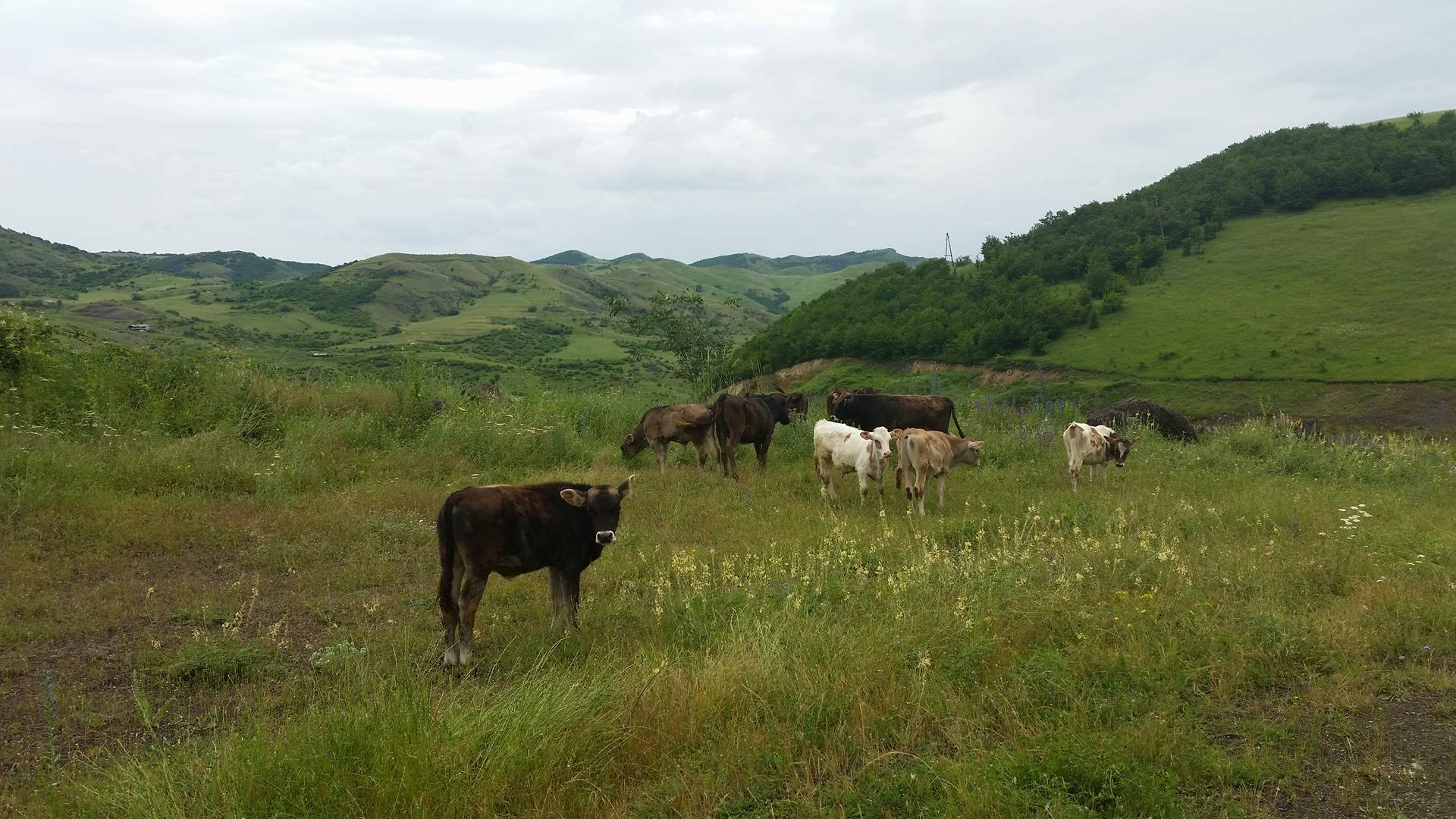

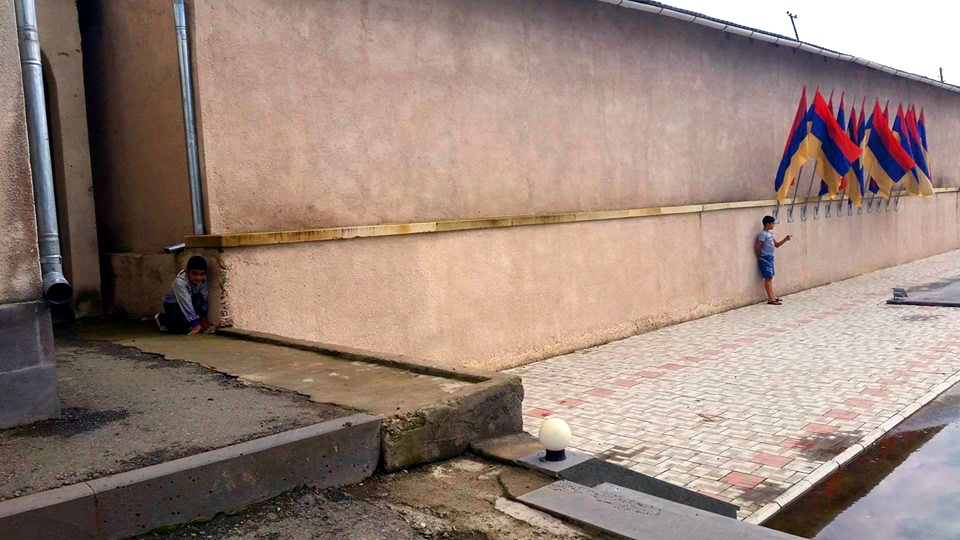
