= Zhmerynka =

City in Vinnytsia Oblast, Ukraine

Zhmerynka Жмеринка
- City
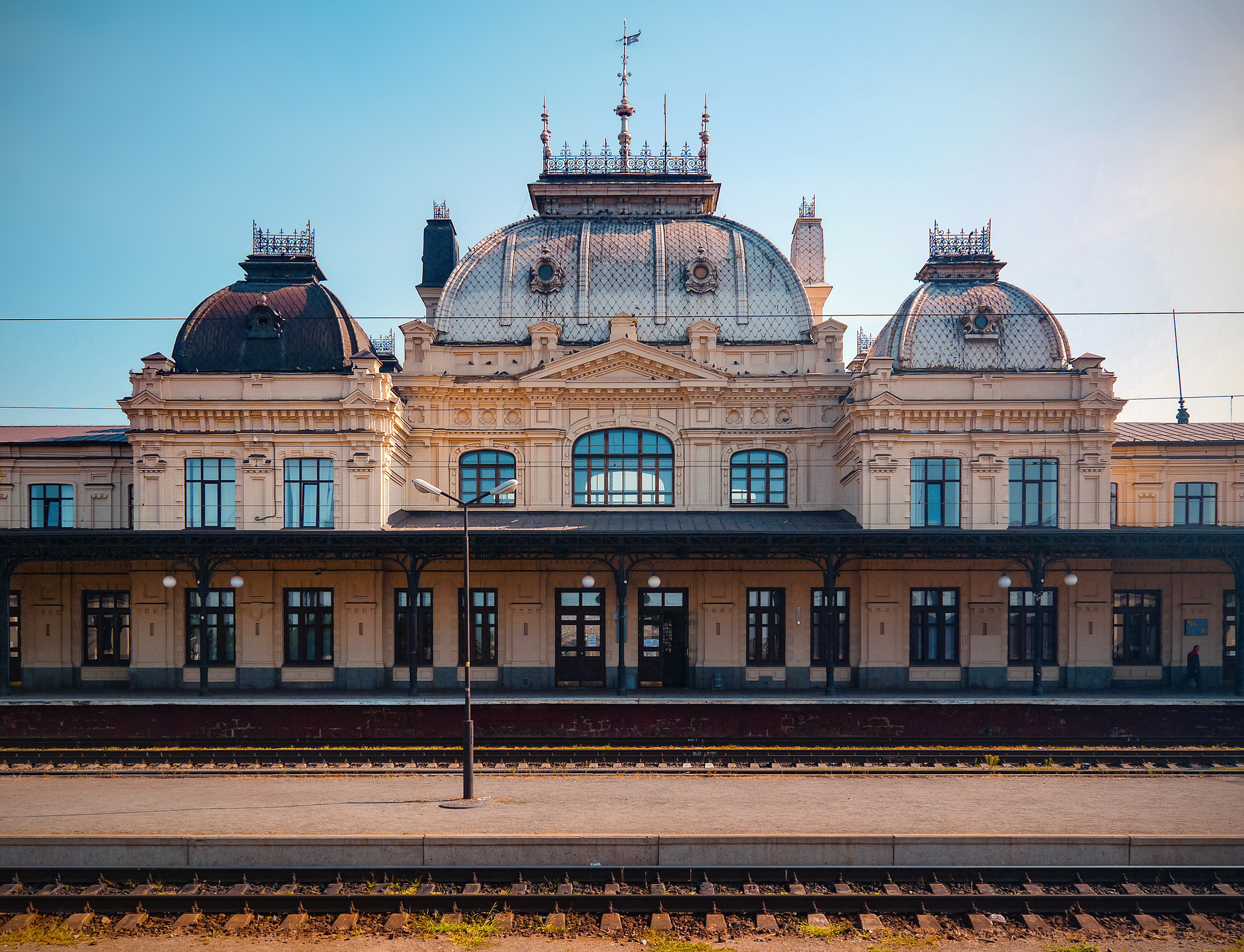
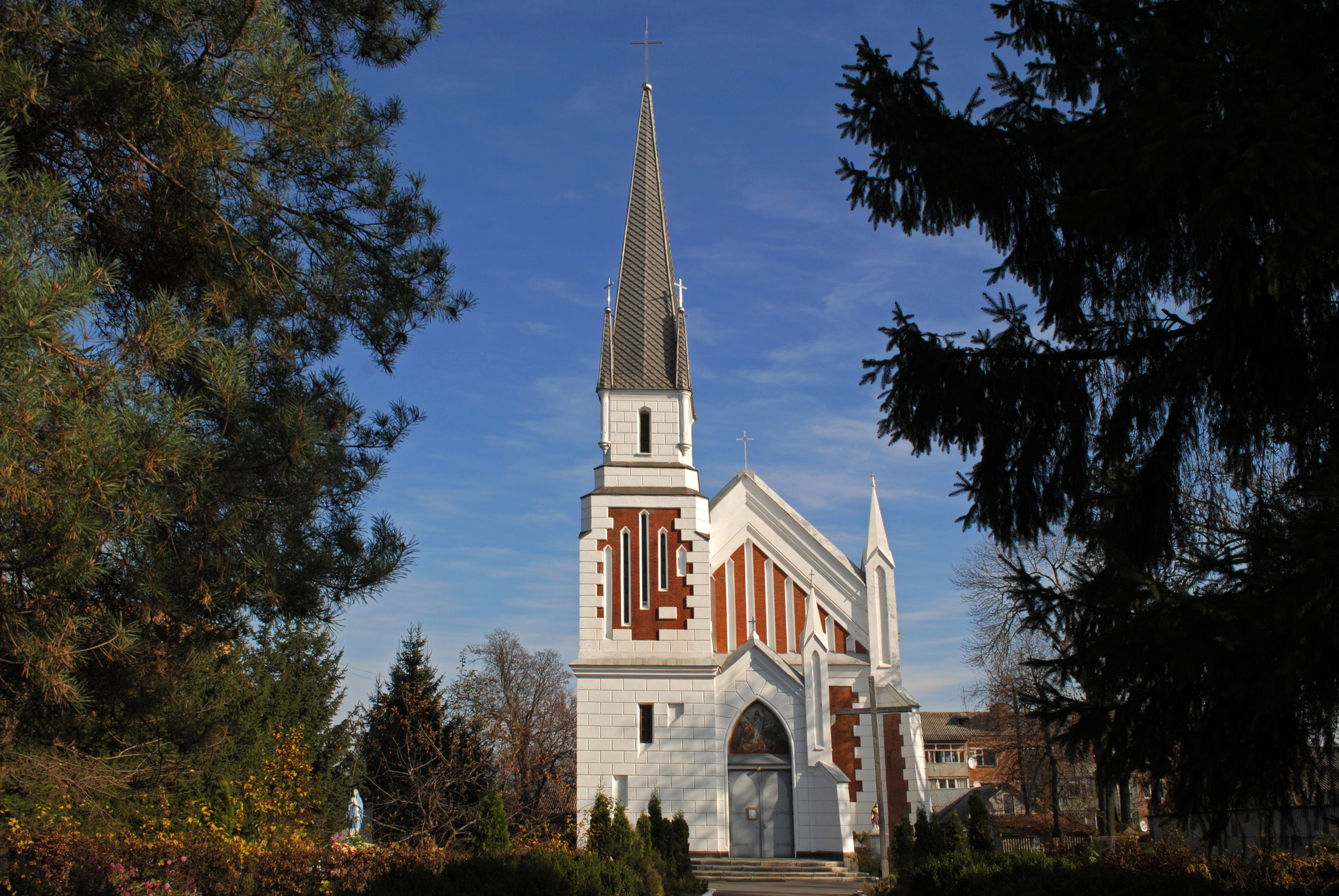
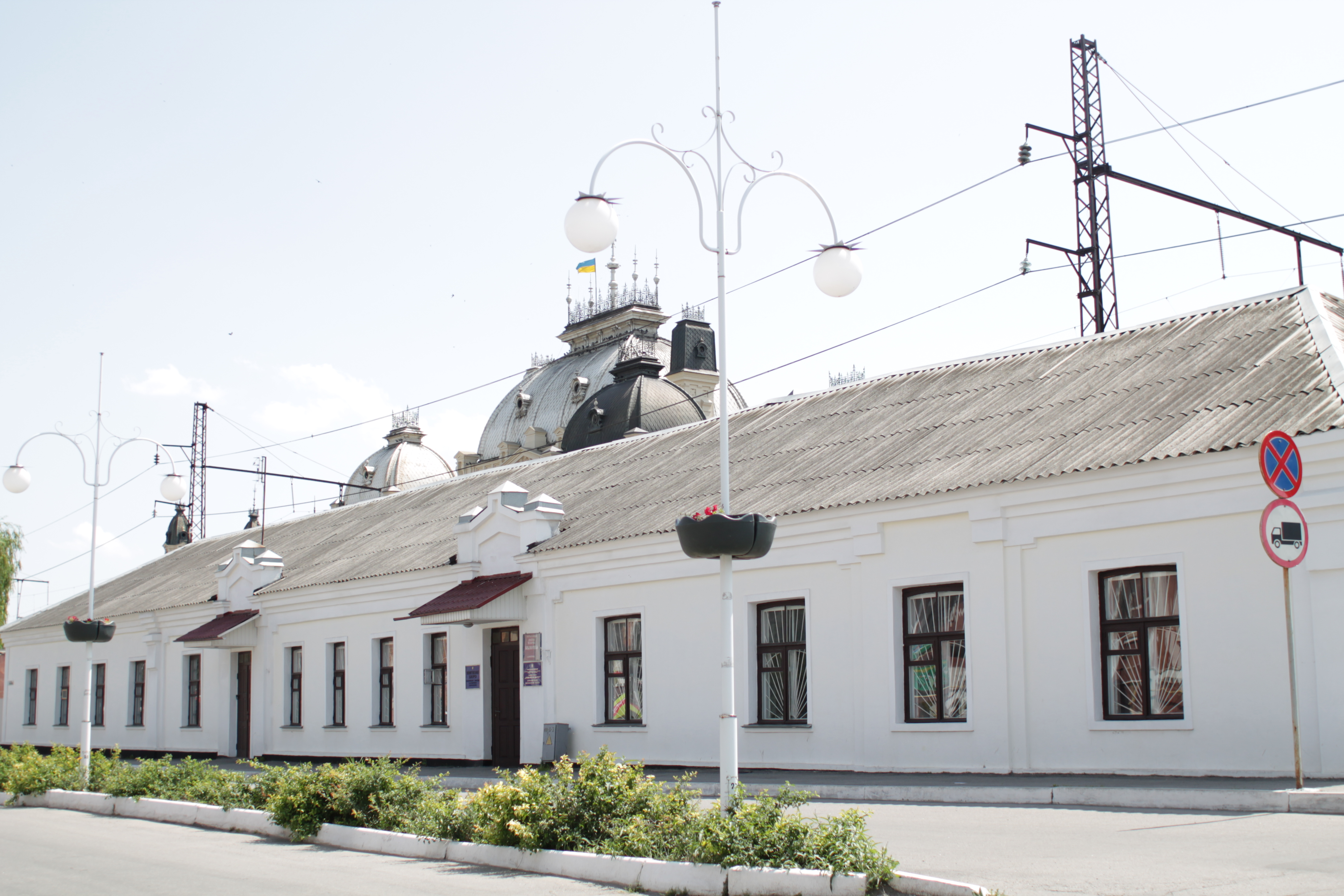
- Top: Train Station; bottom left: Saint Alexius Cathedral; bottom right: Technical Library

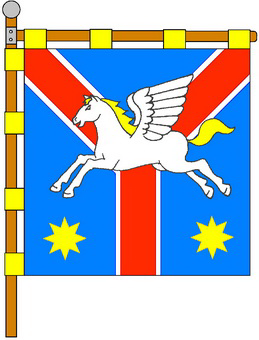
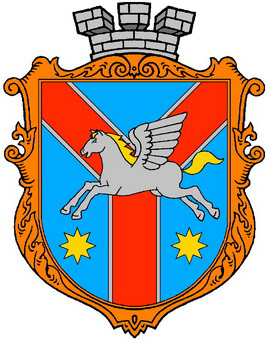
- Flag Coat of arms

- Location within Vinnytsia Oblast Location within Ukraine
- Coordinates: 49°03′N 28°06′E
- Country: Ukraine
- Oblast: Vinnytsia Oblast
- Raion: Zhmerynka Raion
- Hromada: Zhmerynka urban hromada
- Magdeburg rights: 1591

Area
  - Total: 18.26 km^{2} (7.05 sq mi)
- Elevation: 362 m (1,188 ft)

Population (2022)
  - Total: 33,754
  - Density: 1,849/km^{2} (4,788/sq mi)
- Website: www.zhmerinka-adm.gov.ua

Historical population
Year	Pop.	±%
1897	13,900	—
1926	22,200	+59.7%
2022	33,754	+52.0%

Zhmerynka (Ukrainian: Жмеринка, IPA: [ˈʒmɛrɪnkɐ]) is a city in Vinnytsia Oblast, central Ukraine. It serves as the administrative center of Zhmerynka Raion within the oblast. Population: 33,754 (2022 estimate). It is located in the historic region of Podolia.

== History ==
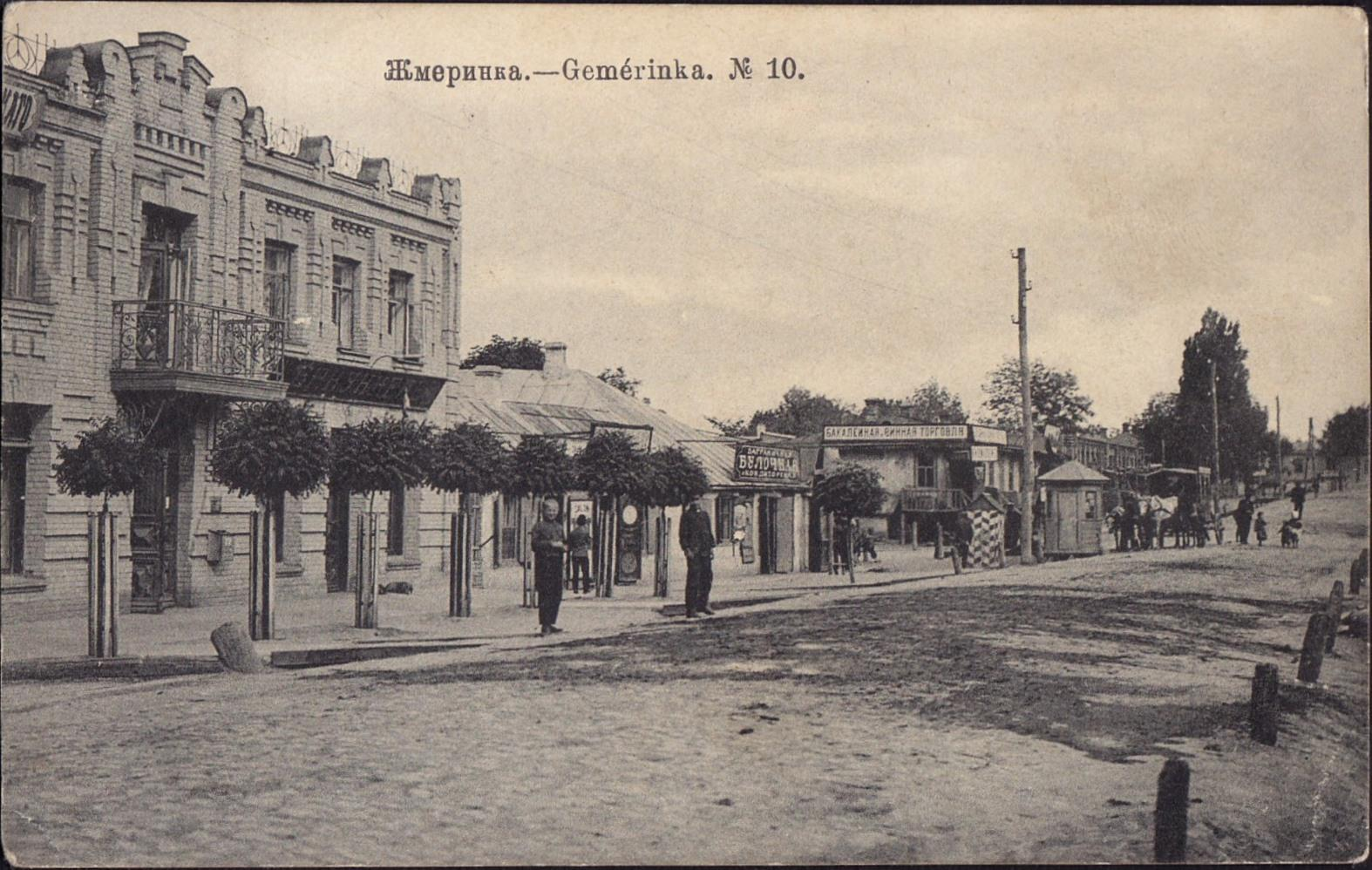
Zhmerynka in the 1910s

Initially there were two neighbouring villages named Zmierzynki Wielkie ("Big Zmierzynki") and Zmierzynki Małe ("Small Zmierzynki"), administratively located in the Winnica County in the Bracław Voivodeship in the Lesser Poland Province of the Kingdom of Poland. The former was a possession of the Potocki family and the latter of the Głowacki family. The villages were annexed by Russia in the Second Partition of Poland (1793), and their names were Russified to Zhmerynka from the Polish Zmierzynka.

In 1870, a railway station was built, and the settlement began to develop more rapidly. In 1903 it was granted city rights, however, the first mayor, Pole Karol Wroński, was appointed only in 1905.

With the fall of Tsarist Russia during World War I, in 1917, the town became part of the newly established Ukrainian People's Republic. In late 1917 2nd Guards Corps of the Russian Army was located in the city. During the war between Poland, Ukraine and Soviet Russia, the town was captured successively by the Soviets in March 1919, by the Ukrainians in June 1919, by the Soviets in January 1920, by the Poles in April 1920. After final capture the Soviets in June 1920, eventually becoming part of the Soviet Union. The city suffered during the famine in 1932–1933.

Zhmerynka was occupied by the Romanian Army during the Second World War from 17 July 1941 until 20 March 1944 and incorporated into the Transnistria Governorate.

== Geography ==
=== Location ===
Zhmerynka is situated in the central-western part of the Vinnytsia region. Zmerynka has an area of 18,2 square kilometers. The average altitude above the sea level is 326m.

=== Climate ===
Zhmerynka has the continental European climate.

== City governance ==
The Mayor of Zhmerynka is elected by the people of Zhmerynka during the direct election process.

The City Assembly may approve or reject the urban development decrees, initiated by the local people, social groups and organizations.

== Religion ==
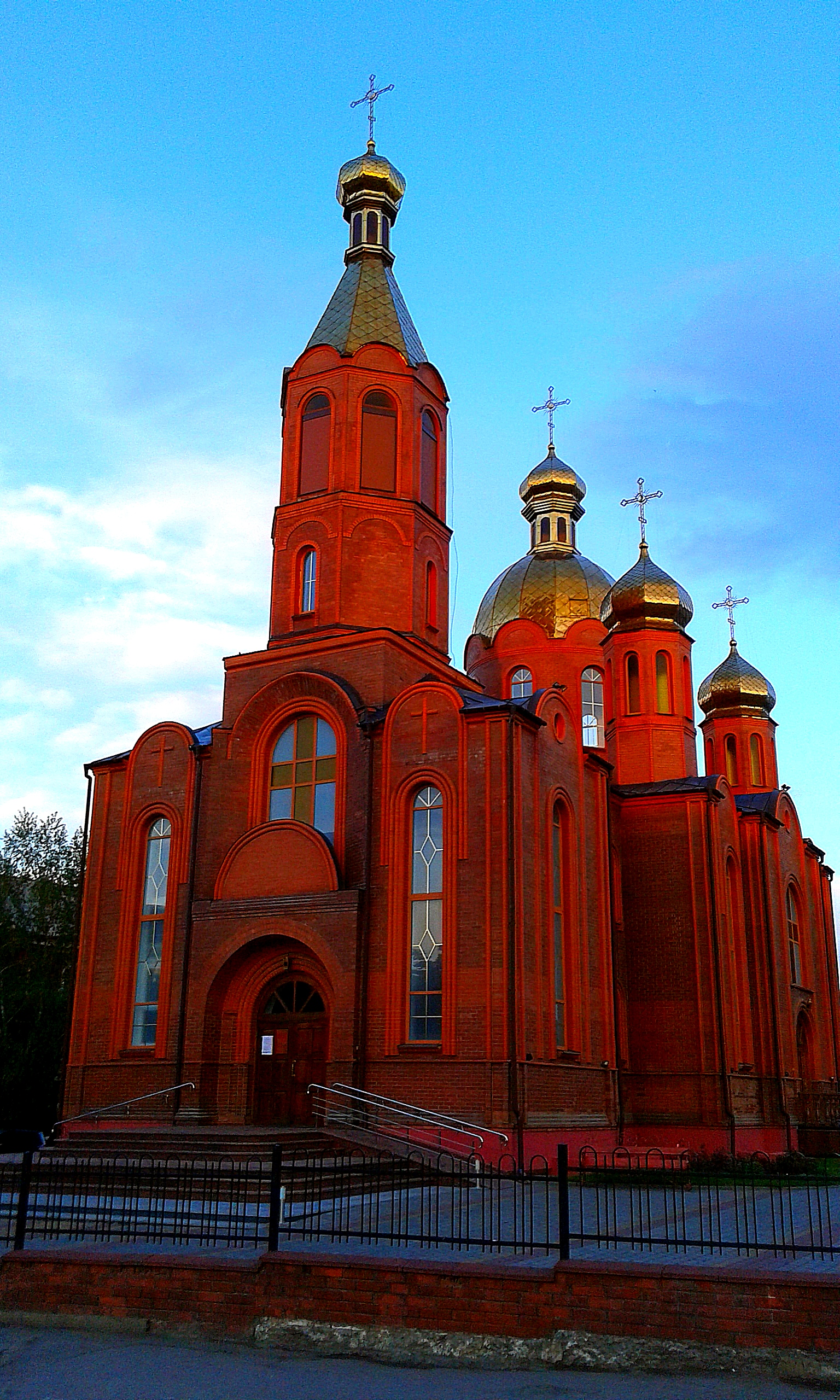
St. Oleksandr Nevs'ky Orthodox Cathedral

=== Orthodox religion ===
The old Orthodox Cathedral was built in 1893, however it was destroyed in 1928.

There is the newly built St. Oleksandr Nevs'ky Orthodox Cathedral, which was made of the red bricks in 2005, in a central part of the city of Zhmerynka.

=== Catholic religion ===
There is the St. Oleksiy Catholic Cathedral, which was built in 1910, in Zhmerynka (see the picture in the Gallery).

=== Jewish religion ===
Many Jewish people were in Zhmerynka before World War II. However, the Synagogue was destroyed during the World War II. Presently, the Jewish people initiated an effort to collect the financial funds to build a new Synagogue in Zhmerynka.

== Economy ==
=== Railway industry ===
The railway company, which is a part of railway transportation industry, is a biggest business and employer in Zhmerynka.

=== Agriculture industry ===
There are many companies, which belong to the agricultural industry in Zhmerynka.

=== Food industry ===
There is a well developed food processing industry with a number of big, medium and small companies.

=== Education industry ===
There are many secondary schools in Zhmerynka, which employ a big number of teachers.

=== Tourism industry ===
There is a number of comfortable hotels with a variety of services, which operate in Zhmerynka.

== Transportation ==
=== Railway transportation ===
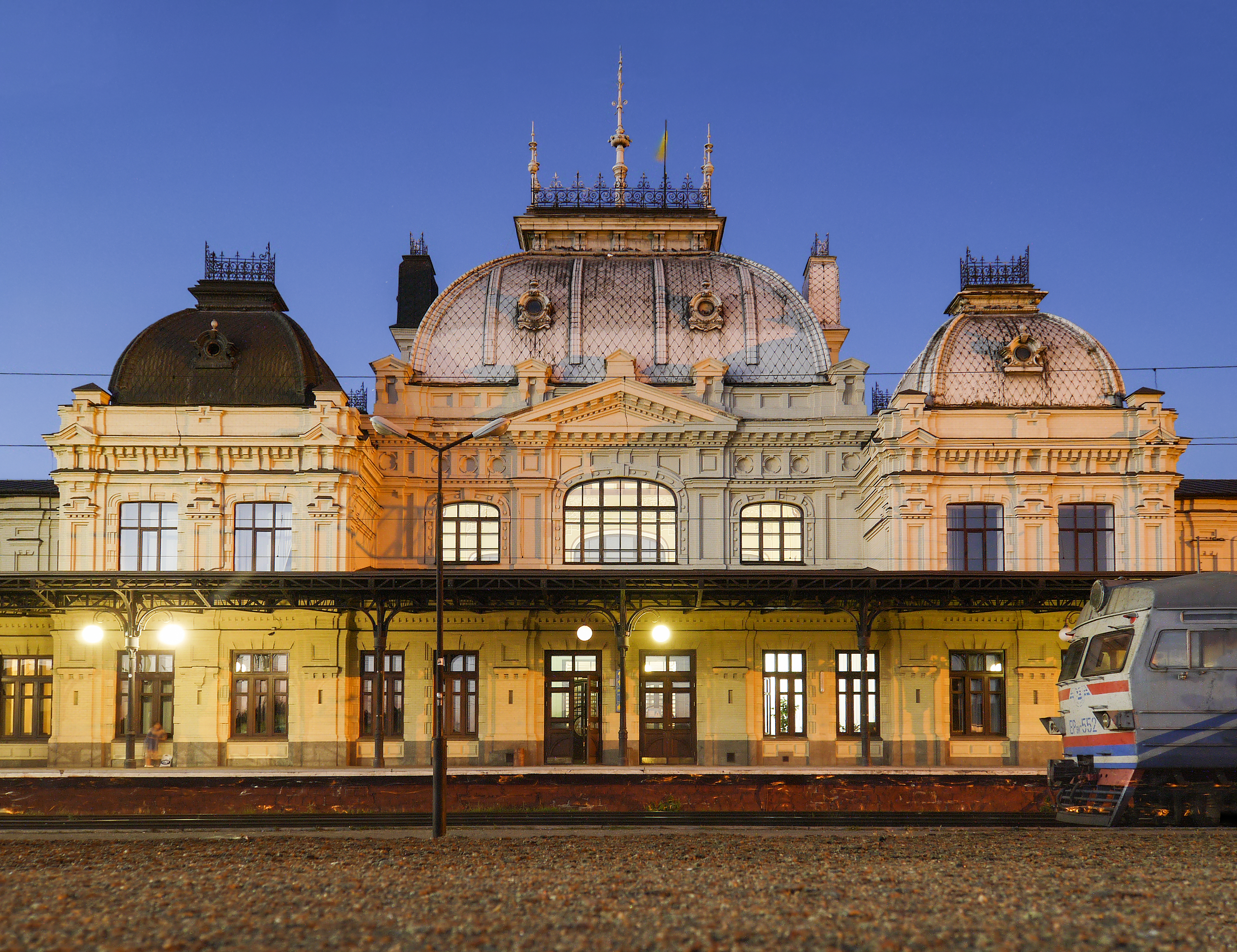
Railway Station

Zhmerynka is a major railway hub in Ukraine.

The initial project of the Zmerynka railway transportation hub was made by Carl von Meck, engineer in 1865.

The building of the Zhmerynka big railway station was designed by architect Zhuravs'ky and built in 1899–1904.

Zhmerynka railway station was fully renovated in 2012.

=== Automobile transportation ===
There is a bus station near the railway station. The distance to Bar, Ukraine is 30 kilometres (19 miles). The distance to Vinnytsia is 35 kilometres (22 miles). The distance to Sharhorod is 37 kilometres (23 miles). The distance to Kyiv is 317 kilometres (197 miles).

== Media ==
=== Printing media ===
Zhmerins'ky Meridian newspaper is published in Zhmerynka. The head office is located at Bohdan Khmelnits'ky Street 19, Zhmerynka 23100, Ukraine.

=== Electronic media ===
There is an FM radio-station: "Obriy", which transmits the local news and the music in Zhmerynka at 67.34 MHz.

=== Internet media ===
There is a number of Internet resources, which monitor the cultural, business, politics news in Zhmerynka.

== Notable people ==
- Jan Brzechwa, Polish poet and writer.
- Valery Brezdenyuk, painter.
- Denis Forov, retired Armenian Greco-Roman wrestler
- Mykola Livytskyi, Ukrainian statesman
- Oleksiy Honcharuk, Ukrainian politician, Prime Minister of Ukraine (2019-2020)

== Twin towns – brother cities ==
Zhmerynka is twinned with:

- Shaki, Azerbaijan
- Skarżysko-Kamienna, Poland
- Sędziszów Małopolski, Poland

== Gallery ==
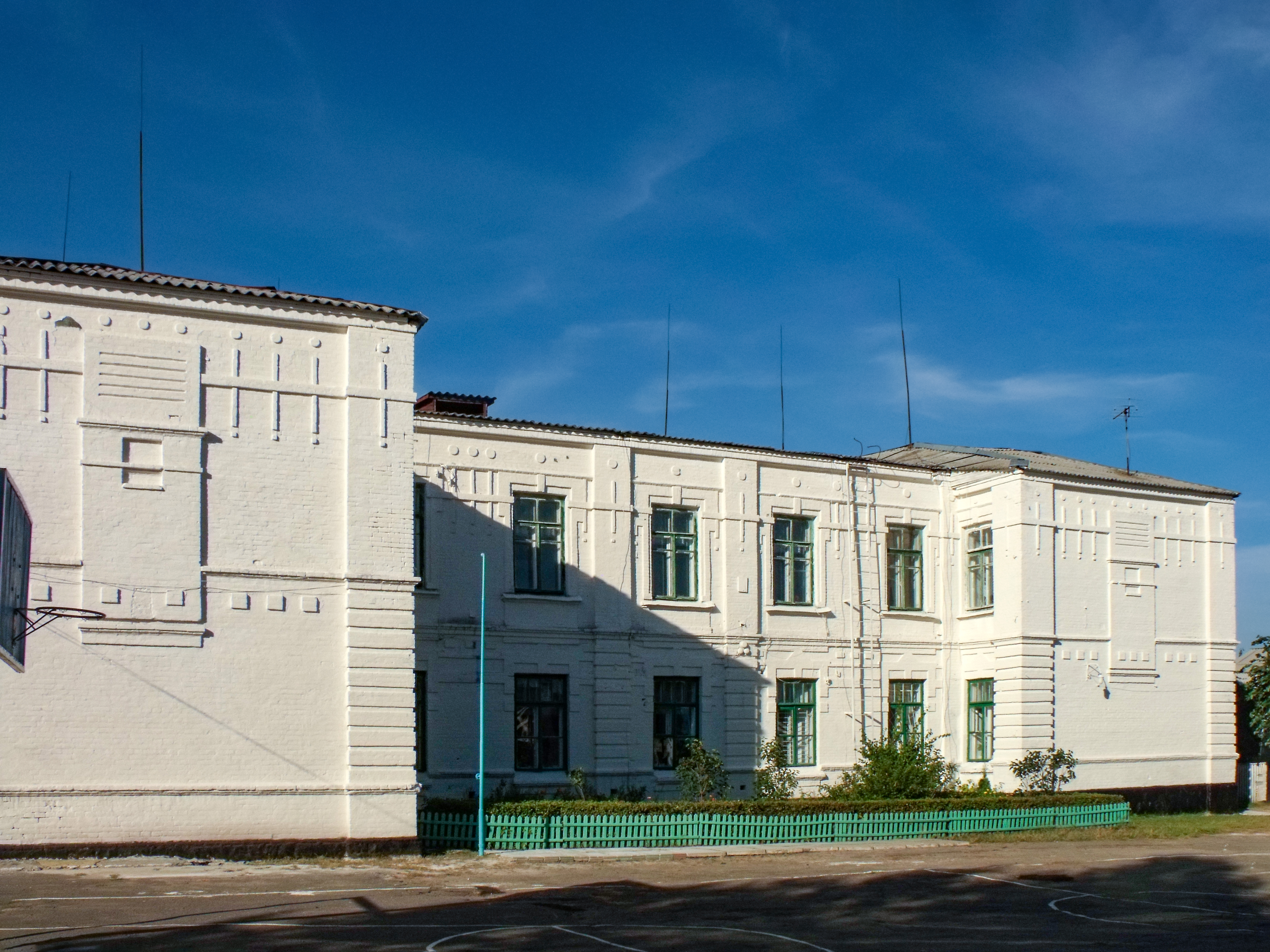
Zhmerinka Gymnasium

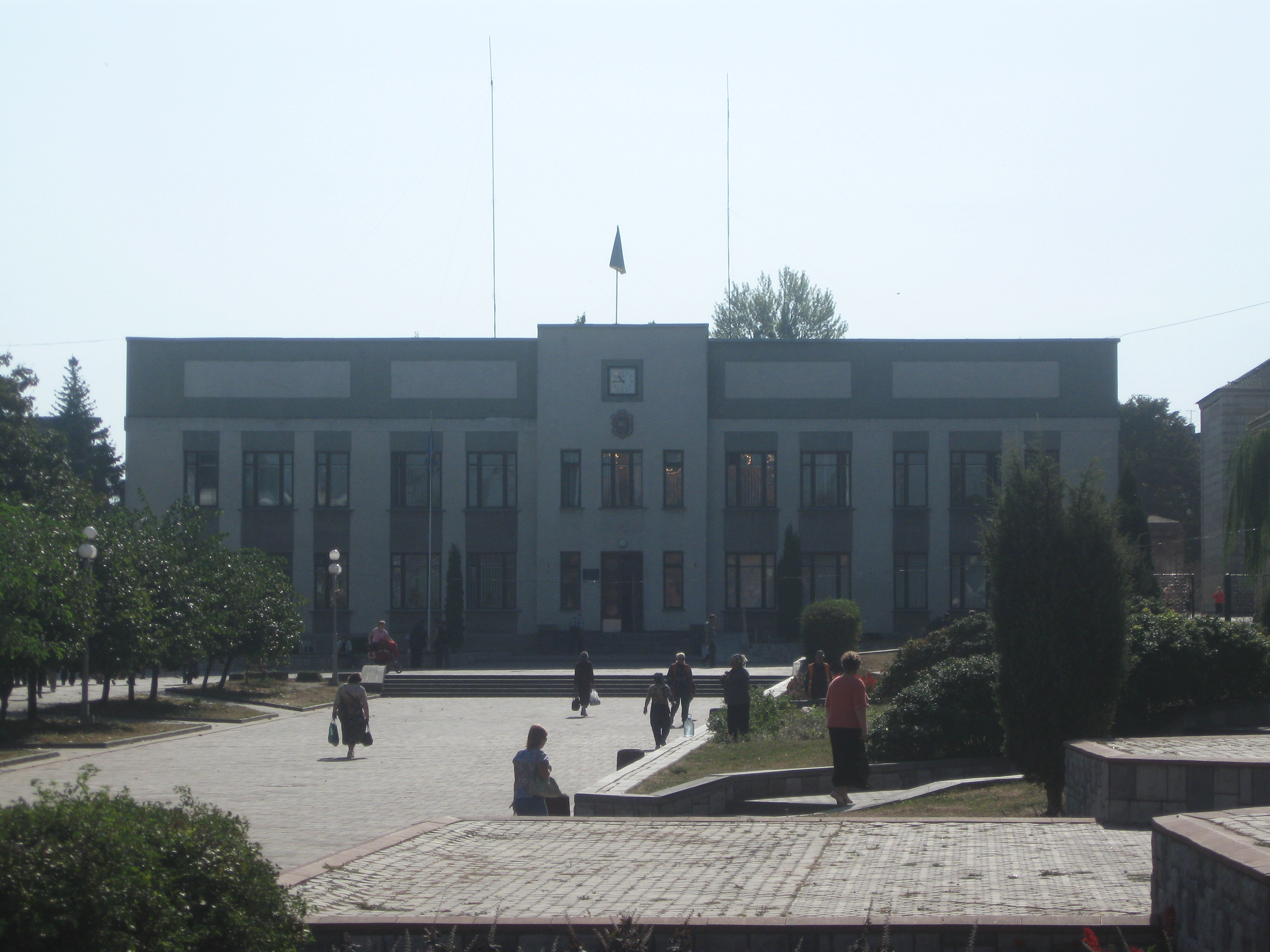
Zhmerinka City Council

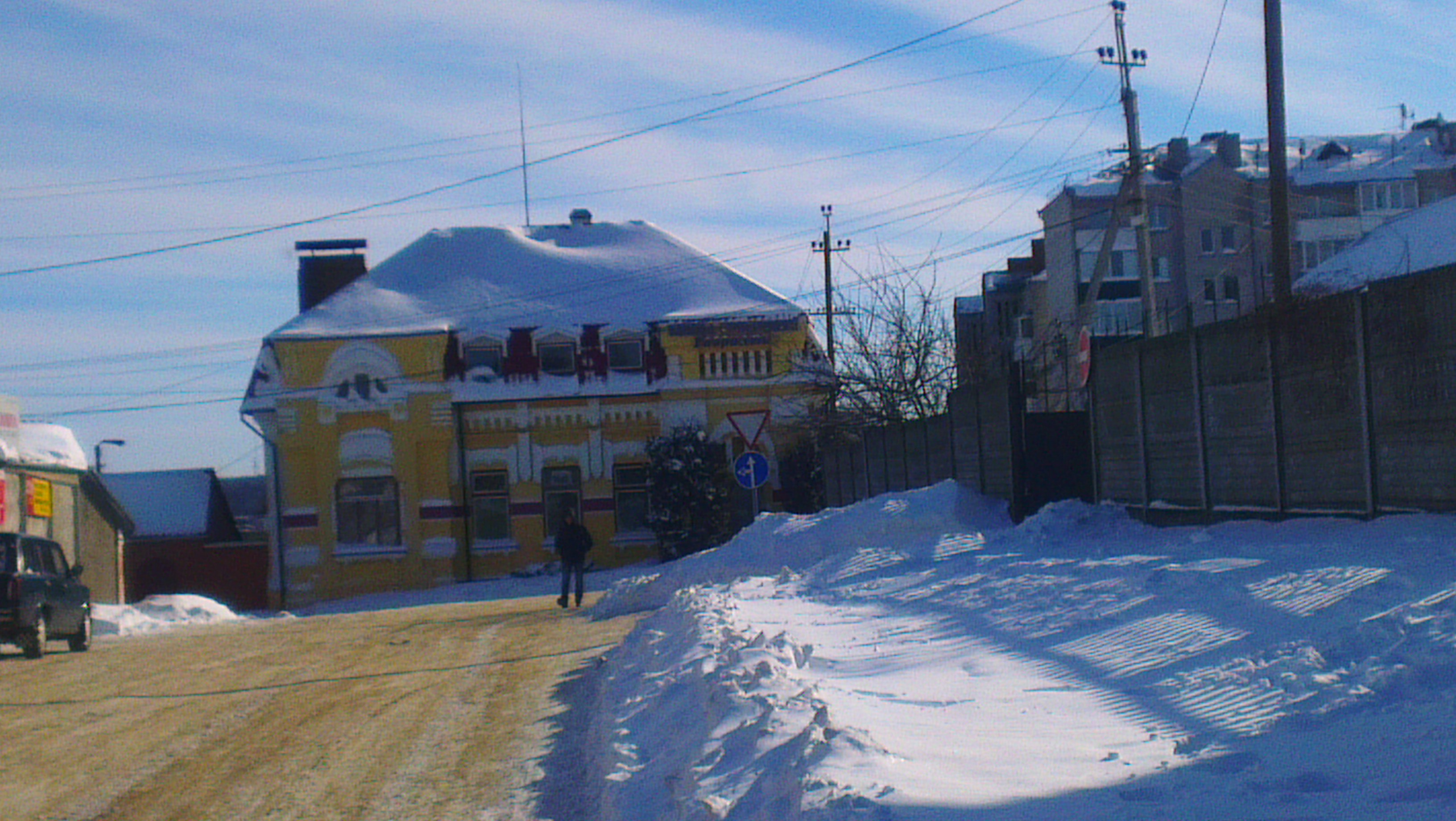
Havryliuk dentistry

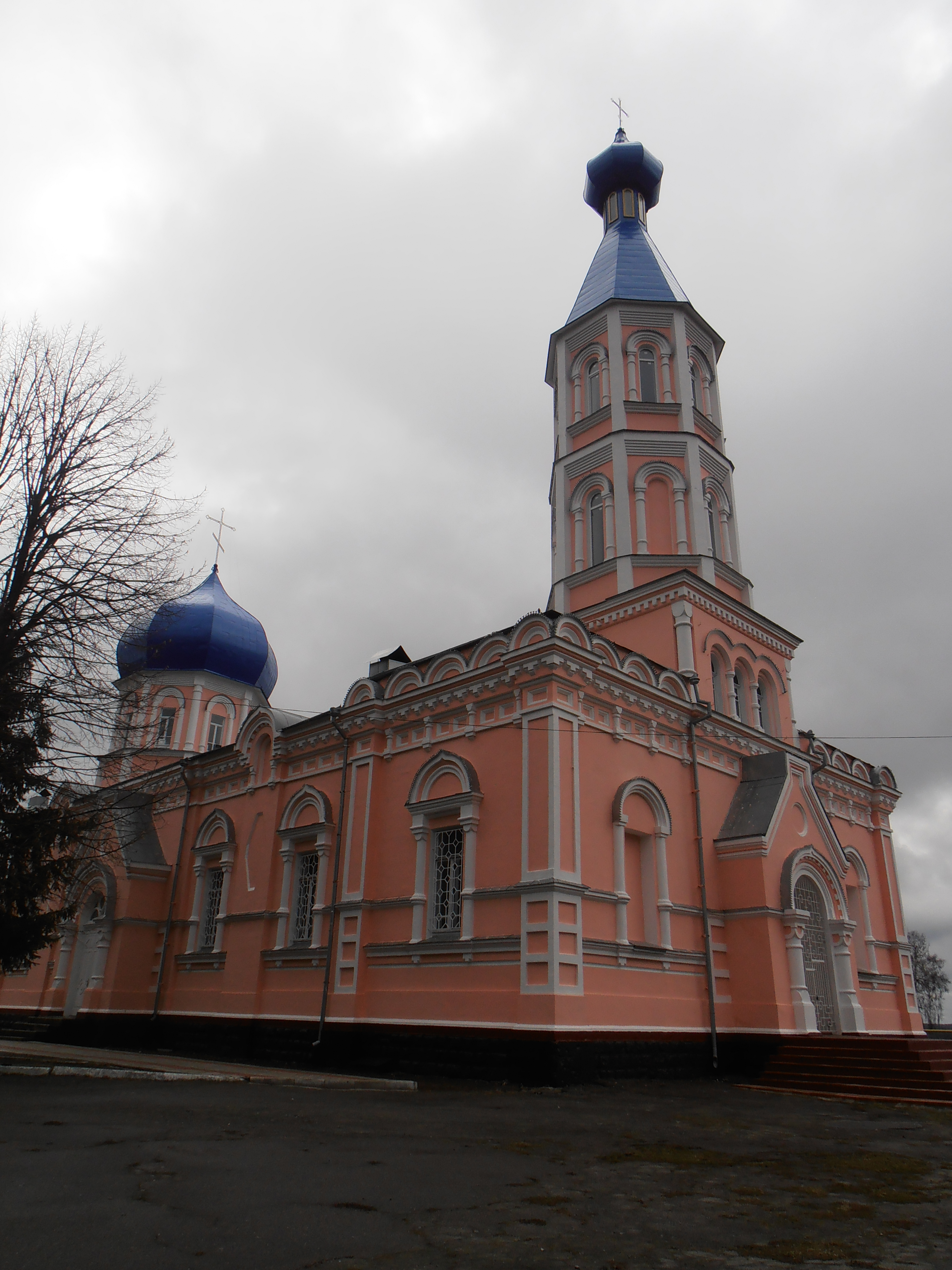
Church of St. Nicholas

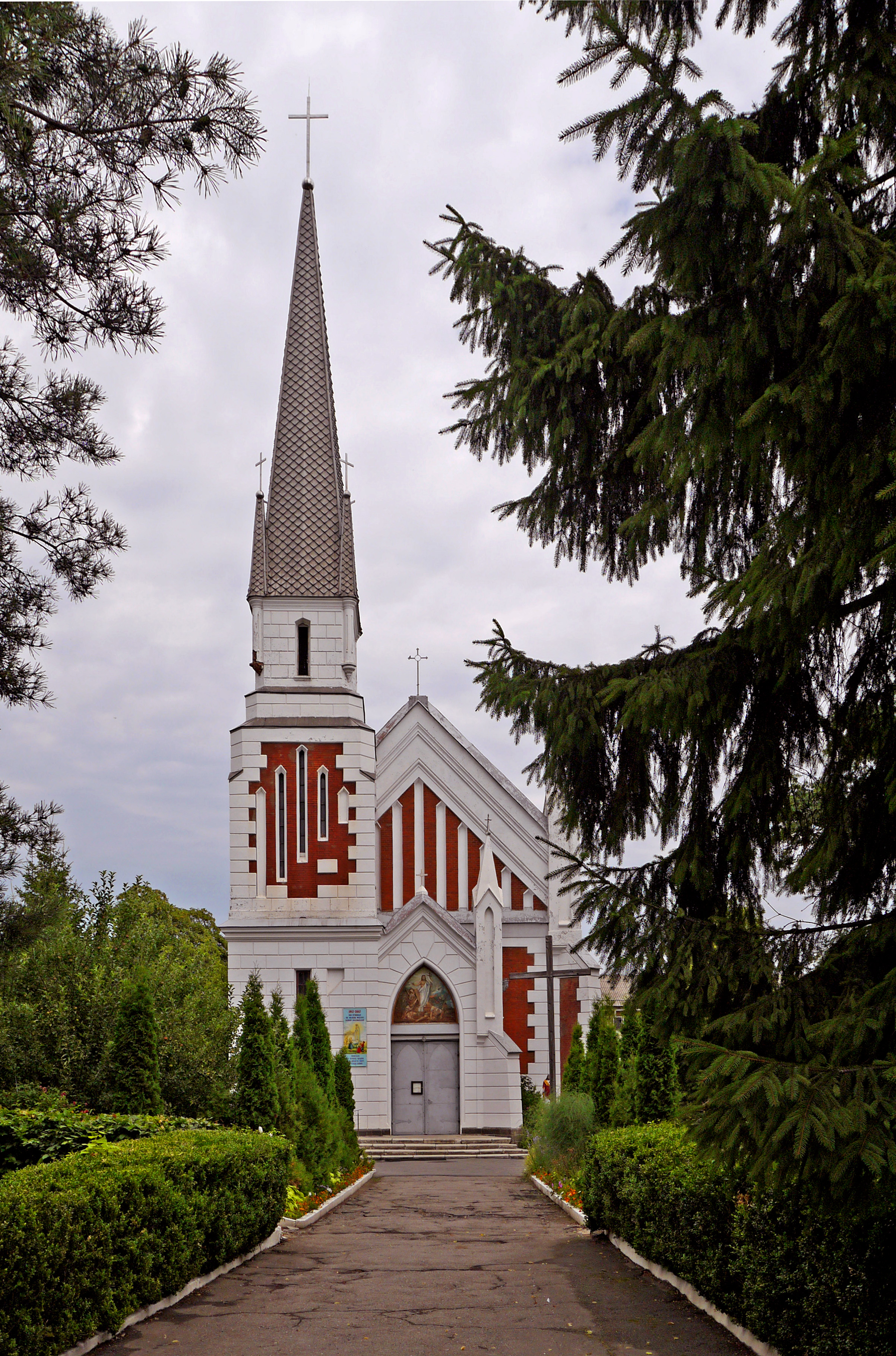
St Alexius Cathedral

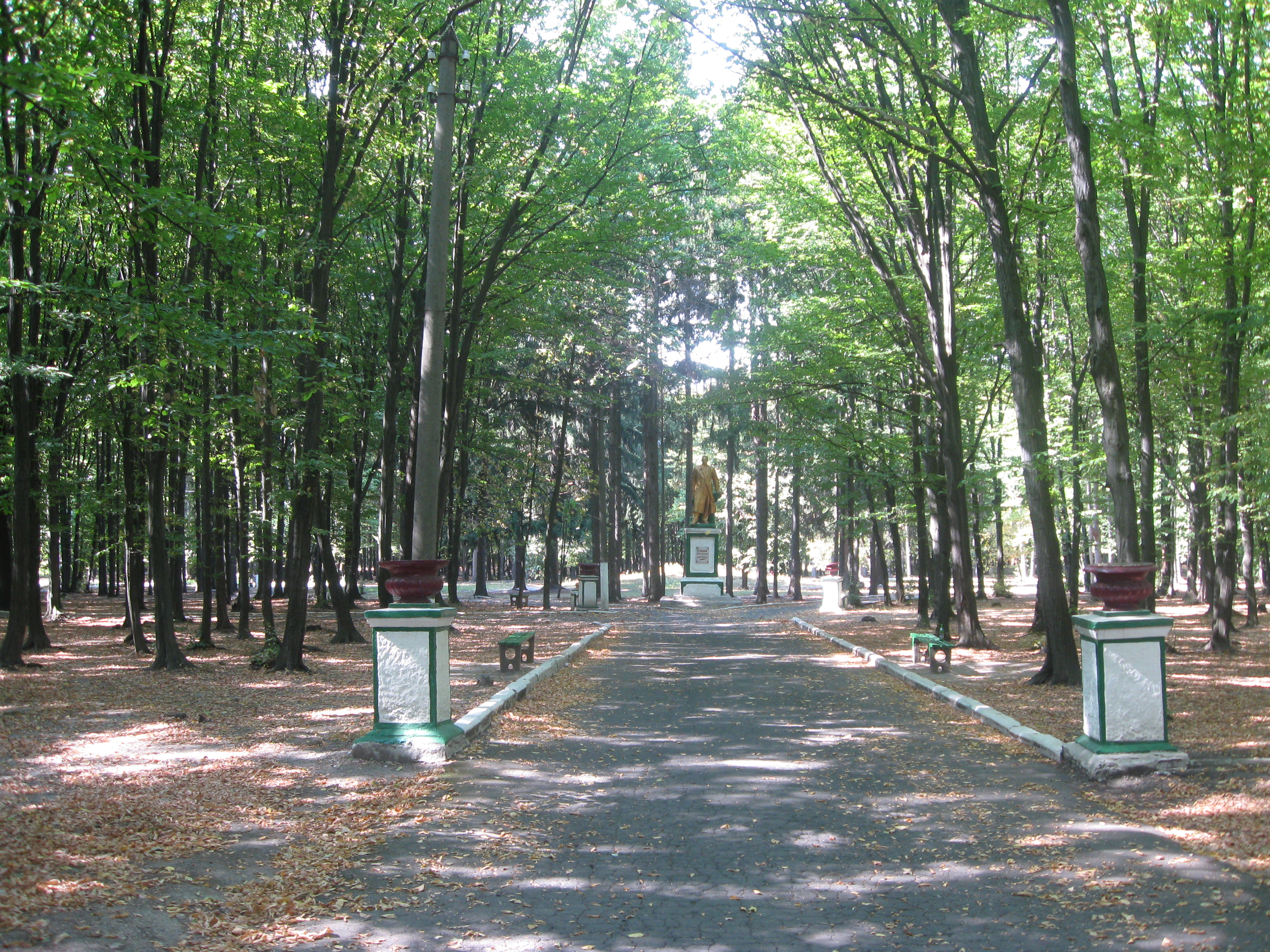
Gorky park
