= Shalva Nutsubidze =

Georgian philosopher (1888–1969)

- შალვა ნუცუბიძე
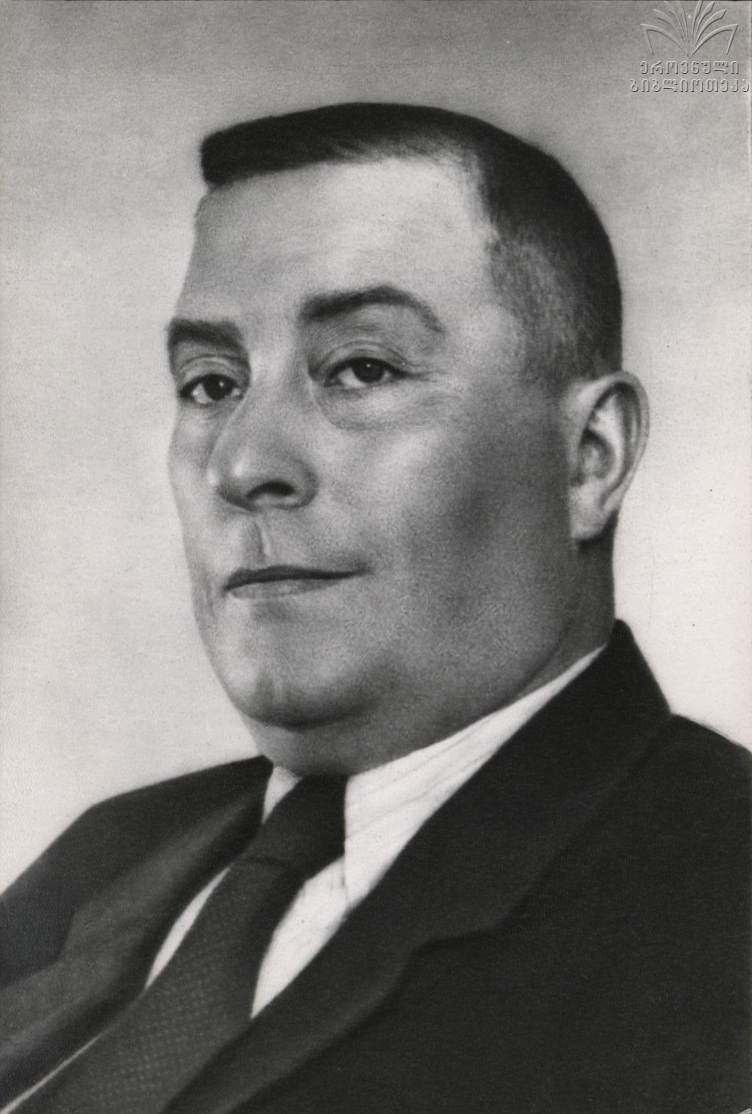
- Born: December 14, 1888; Partskhanakanevi, Russian Empire
- Died: January 6, 1969 (aged 80); Tbilisi, Georgian Soviet Socialist Republic
- Resting place: Tbilisi State University Pantheon
- Education: Saint Petersburg State University; Leipzig University
- Spouses: Agnessa Filipova; Ketevan Klimiashvili
- Awards: Order of the Red Banner of Labour
- Scientific career
- Fields: Philosophy; History; Literary criticism
- Workplaces: Tbilisi State University; Leipzig University

Shalva Nutsubidze (Georgian: შალვა ნუცუბიძე; December 14, 1888 – January 6, 1969) was a Georgian philosopher, cultural historian, rustvelologist, literary critic, translator, public figure, one of the founders of scientific school in the field of history of Georgian philosophy, one of the founders and prorector (1920–1929) of the Tbilisi State University, Director of the Fundamental Library of the TSU, Dean of the Department of History of World Literature, Doctor of Philosophy, Professor, elected member of the Academy of Sciences of the Georgian SSR (1944), Meritorious Scientific Worker of Georgia (1961).

Nutsubidze attended universities in Saint Petersburg, Berlin, and Leipzig. In 1917, he obtained assistant professorship of the Saint Petersburg State University. He received the degree of Doctor of Philosophy in 1927.

From 1904 to 1911, Nutsubidze was a member of the Bolskevik wing of the Russian Social Democratic Labour Party and the Georgian Socialist-Federalist Revolutionary Party from 1915. From 1919 to 1921, he was a member of the Constituent Assembly of Georgia. After the Soviet annexation of the Democratic Republic of Georgia, he did not leave the country.

He founded his original philosophical doctrine, Alethiologian Realism, while working in Germany. Nutsubidze studied the history of Georgian philosophy in the 1930s, laying the groundwork for a new field of Kartvelian studies, the history of Georgian philosophy. He developed the theory of the Eastern Renaissance and the Nutsubidze-Honigmann theory, which established the identity of Peter the Iberian and Pseudo-Dionysius the Areopagite.

Nutsubidze was fluent in Greek, Latin, German, Russian, and French. His translation of The Knight in the Panther's Skin into Russian language is considered one of the best translations of this poem.

== Ancestry ==
Nutsubidze's grandfathers were both priests. Philipe Datiashvili, his grandfather (from mother's side), loved to read and taught his grandson Nuskhuri alphabet to read at a young age. Nutsubidze's father, Isak Nutsubidze, was a teacher. He studied with Vazha-Pshavela at Gori's Mastery Seminary before becoming a teacher in Khoni and Kutaisi. Isak Nutsubidze was a skilled hunter who frequently went hunting with his son. He died in 1927. Nutsubidze's mother, Rebeka Datiashvili, was from Kvitiri.

Nutsubidze's elder sisters were Aneta, Tamar, Elene, and Nino. Tamar, one of them, attended St. Petersburg Technological University and then the Faculty of Geography and Geology at Tbilisi State University. He worked as a researcher and academic secretary at the Institute of Geography of the Georgian National Academy of Sciences. Nino, the second sister, graduated from the Russian Department of the Faculty of Philology of Tbilisi State University and worked as a Russian language teacher, first at a school and then at the Tbilisi Medical Institute.

== Early years and education ==
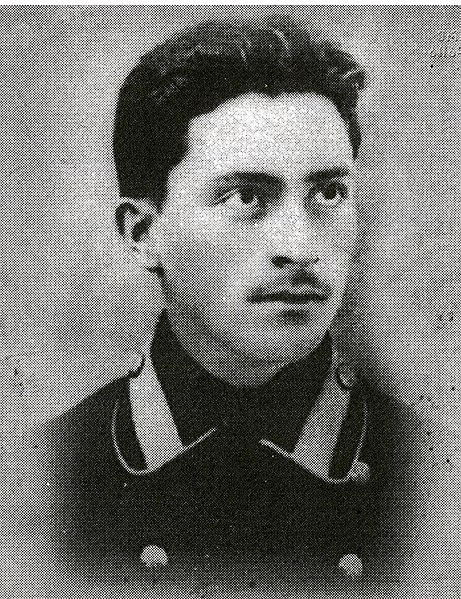
Young Nutsubidze

Nutsubidze was born on December 14, 1888, in Partskhanakanevi (near Kutaisi). He attended Khoni Primary School and Khoni's Mastery Seminary for his primary education. Here he met with Akaki Tsereteli, Vazha-Pshavela, Niko Nikoladze, Ivane Gomarteli, Barbara Kipiani, and Ilia Khoneli first time. In 1897, he continued his studies at the Kutaisi Classical Gymnasium. He was elected editor of the illegal magazine "Gantiadi" in sixth grade, which he led until he graduated from high school.

From 1904 to 1905, he was an active participant in the gymnasium's political life. In 1904, he joined the Bolshevik fraction of the Social-Democratic Workers' Party. He worked as a regional propagandist and attended the funeral of the revolutionary Alexander Tsulukidze in 1905, where he also spoke on behalf of the Samtredia organization. From 1905 to 1906, he attended illegal Vano Sturua meetings. He was part of a group led by Vano Sturua that traveled from St. Petersburg to Finland in 1906 to meet with Vladimir Lenin.

In 1905, Isak Nutsubidze was appointed headmaster of the school in the village of Kulashi, and the family relocated there. Nutsubidze graduated from the Classical Gymnasium and enrolled in the Department of Philosophy of the Faculty of History and Philology at St. Petersburg University in 1906. While studying in St. Petersburg, he once again collaborated with Georgian revolutionary students such as Vano Sturua, Mamia Orakhelashvili, Shalva Eliava, Silibistro Todria, and others.

Nutsubidze delivered a lecture about "Philosophical and Historical Materialism" at the public session of St. Petersburg's University in 1907. During his stay at university, he studied under Alexander Vvedensky, N. Karaev, N. Losky, and others. Nutsubidze frequently visited Georgia and read public reports about political issues. The report "Marxism and Personality", which was read at the Kutaisi Theater, drew a large audience, and the police almost detained members of the Imereti-Samegrelo Committee of the Social Democratic Party, who were listening to the report from behind the scenes.

Nutsubidze graduated from St. Petersburg University in 1910 and began his career as a history, psychology, and Latin language teacher in the Kuban Oblast. Later, with the assistance of Professor Alexander Vvedensky, he returned to St. Petersburg University, passed the master's oral and written examinations, and began lecturing in 1917 to achieve the Privatdozent degree. Nutsubidze received a Privatdozent degree the same year.

He was twice dispatched on scientific visits to Europe from St. Petersburg University. From 1911 to 1914, every May–August, he attended summer seminars in Germany. He founded his original philosophical doctrine, Alethiologian Realism, while working in Germany. He spent much of his time at Leipzig, where he was mentored by notable philosophers such as Wilhelm Wundt, Johannes Folkelt, and Karl Barth. Nutsubidze was a teacher at St. Petersburg's Second Gymnasium in 1914. Grigol Tsereteli, who eventually became his closest friend, met him here. Nutsubidze was a lecturer at St. Petersburg University from 1916 to 1918.

== Tbilisi State University ==
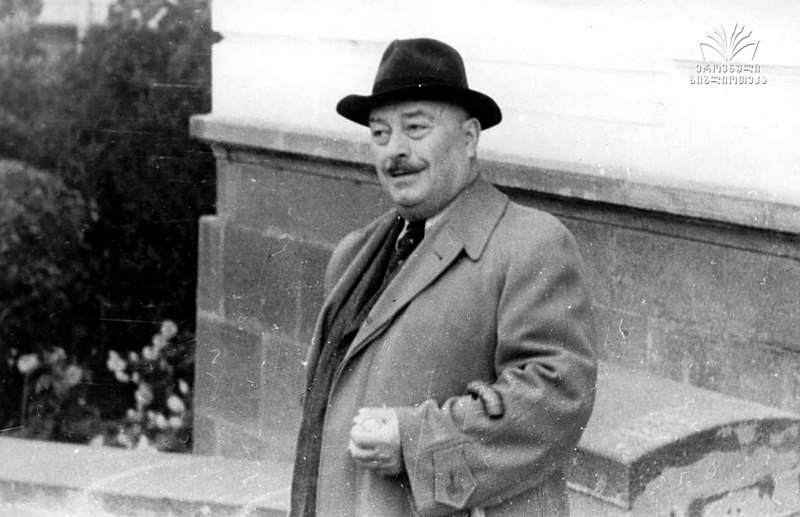
Nutsubidze in the yard of Tbilisi State University

Nutsubidze was a key figure in the formation of Tbilisi State University. During his stay in St. Petersburg in 1917, Giorgi Akhvlediani handed him Ivane Javakhishvili's invitation. Nutsubidze left his wife and children in St. Petersburg and returned to Tbilisi to participate in the university's establishment preparations. He was in charge of bringing Georgian professors to the university.

Nutsubidze held a variety of posts at the university, including Vice-Rector (1920–1929), Dean, Director of the Fundamental Library, Head of the department, First Dean of the Faculty of Social and Economic Sciences, and others. He also founded and oversaw a law school. For 15 years, he was the Dean of the Department of History of World Literature, which eventually became the Faculty of Western European Languages and Literature. Nutsubidze taught a variety of courses at different faculties, including logic, introduction to philosophy, historical materialism, history of social and political thoughts, scientific methodology, history of Western European literature, and others.

Nutsubidze was also tasked with writing textbooks for students studying philosophy at Tbilisi State University. In a short period of time, he prepared textbooks on which subsequent generations (Mose Gogiberidze, Konstantine Megrelidze, Savle Tsereteli, Konstantine Bakradze, Angia Bochorishvili) were raised: "Logic. Elementary Textbook" in 1919, "Logic for Secondary School" and "Introduction to Philosophy, Part I, The Problem of Cognition" in 1920 and "Logic: A Propaedeutic Course" in 1923.

Nutsubidze and his companions (Sergi Gorgadze, among others) established the Petritsi Intellectual Society at Tbilisi State University in 1918, organizing seminars and discussions to gather Georgian philosophical monuments and spread philosophical knowledge. He also introduced "General Education Courses", in which students of all ages who did not have a high school degree were admitted and allowed to continue their education at the university after graduation. The classes were incorporated into government school in 1927.

== 1920–1940 ==
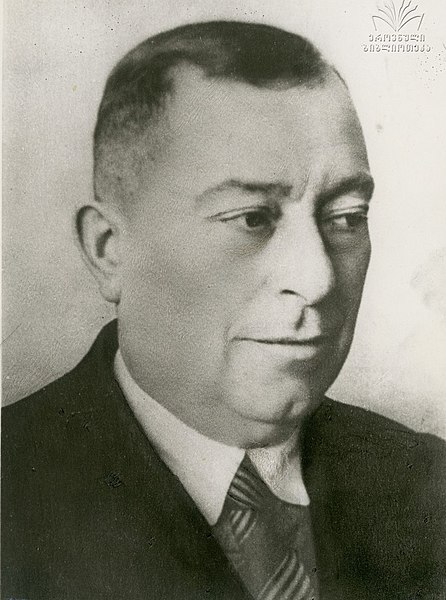
Nutsubidze

Nutsubidze and Giorgi Chubinashvili attended an exhibition of Georgian art relics in Germany in 1920. In 1921, he started working for Tedo Glonti's Socialist-Federalist newspaper, which was published with the consent of the Revolutionary Committee. The "Social Philosophy Studying Group" was founded the same year under his direction.

On the recommendation of the university's pedagogical department, Nutsubidze left for Europe in 1925, to become acquainted with the work of philosophical seminars at Berlin University. Nutsubidze was a professor at Leipzig University from 1925 until 1926. He intended to translate "The Basics of Aletheology" into German while on a scientific trip, but changed his mind and authored a new book, "Wahrheit und Erkenntnisstruktur" ("Truth and the Structure of Cognition"), which was reviewed in 1926 by prominent Neo-Kantians Arthur Liberty and Buchenau.

Nutsubidze received the degree of Doctor of Philosophy on April 17, 1927, after successfully defending his doctoral dissertation, "Truth and the Structure of Cognition". He went on a scientific trip to Germany in 1928. In 1930, he traveled to Germany to see an exhibition of Georgian art relics. Nutsubidze was not permitted to continue his philosophy lectures at Tbilisi State University after his return to Georgia.

He was a senior researcher at the Tbilisi Teaching Institute in 1935.

== 1940–1950 ==
Nutsubidze was a professor at the Maxim Gorky Institute of World Literature in Moscow from 1940 to 1941. He returned to Georgia in 1942 and resumed his lecturing at Tbilisi State University. Nutsubidze was elected a full member of the Georgian SSR Academy of Sciences in 1944.

Nutsubidze was dispatched to Berlin on a special assignment in 1945. According to one story, he was in charge of investigating the fate of Yakov Dzhugashvili, though his presence and work in Berlin were exploited to hold Georgian exiles by Soviet security services.

He began working at the Institute of Philosophy of the Soviet Socialist Republic of Georgia in 1946. At the same time, he taught a course at Tbilisi State University about the history of Georgian philosophy. During a discussion at the Institute of Philosophy in 1948, Petre Sharia and Ilarion Talakhadze fiercely criticized the work "Rustaveli and the Eastern Renaissance", and Nutsubidze was dismissed a year later.

== Politics ==
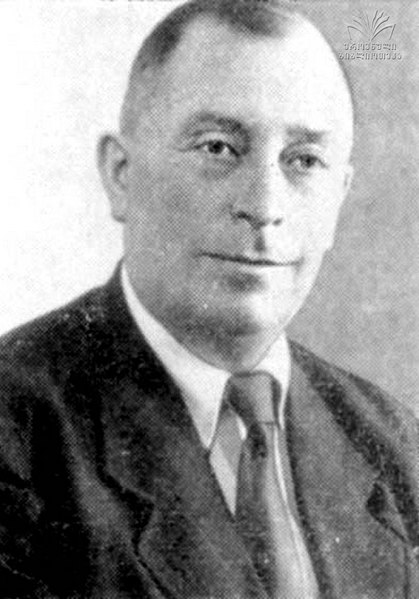
Nutsubidze

Nutsubidze was a prominent political figure. He was actively involved in the school's political life while still in high school. From 1904 until 1911, he was a member of the Bolshevik wing of the Russian Social Democratic Labour Party, which he left in 1911 to join the Georgian Social-Federalist Revolutionary Party. In 1917, he was elected to the Central Council of All-Russian National Socialist Parties and as a representative of it was dispatched to St. Petersburg, where the Declaration of All-Russian Nationalities was declared. He was elected to the National Council of Georgia in November of the same year.

Nutsubidze was elected to the main committee of the Georgian Socialist-Federalist Revolutionary Party in 1918. From 1919 to 1921, he was a member of the Constituent Assembly of Georgia from the same party. He signed the Declaration of Independence of Georgia. He served in the Educational and Librarian Commissions.

The Constituent Assembly met on February 1, 1921. During the break, Nutsubidze and Benia Chkhikvishvili had a dispute in which Benia punched Nutsubidze in the eye and took his hand towards the handgun, while Nutsubidze threw a chair at him. A few days after the confrontation, the Socialist-Federalists proposed to the Constituent Assembly's Presidium that Chkhikvishvili's Membership of Parliament status be revoked, but the Assembly voted and removed the topic from the agenda. In response to public dissatisfaction demonstrations were held.

Nutsubidze did not emigrate with the government after Georgia was annexed by Russian Soviet Federative Socialist Republic on February 25, 1921. Two days later Nutsubidze led the formation of a temporary main committee of the Federalist Party. The Federalists supported the Soviet government as a result of the committee's decision.

Between 1923 and 1929, Nutsubidze served in the Central Executive Committees of the Transcaucasian Socialist Federative Soviet Republic and the Georgian Soviet Socialist Republic. He was a president of Georgian branch of the Union for Cultural Relations with Foreign Countries in 1934.

== Repressions ==
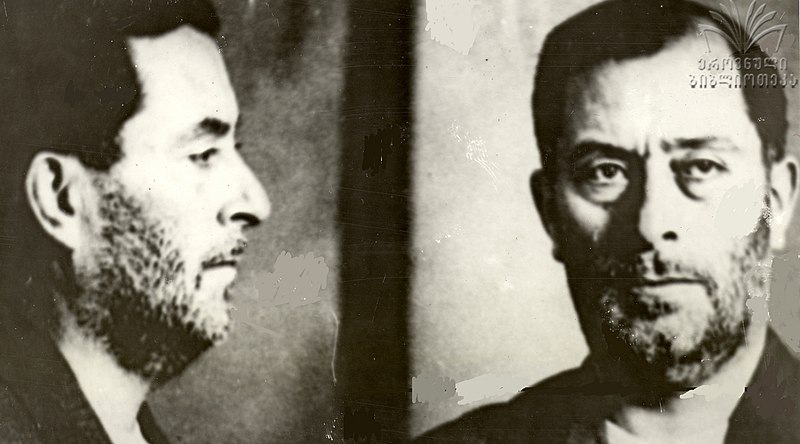
Nutsubidze in prison

Nutsubidze was detained in Tashiskari on August 31, 1938, on suspicion of spying for Germany. He was handed to the People's Committee of the USSR for State Security on December 1, the same year, after being accompanied from Tbilisi to Moscow. He was charged with counter-revolutionary actions, propaganda, and direct actions against the working class and the revolutionary movement in support of the counter-revolutionary government.

While in prison, Nutsubidze was ordered to translate "The Knight in the Panther's Skin" into Russian language by Ioseb Jughashvili, but he had already begun translating of the poem in 1937 and had been reading sections in the audience. In compensation for a translation, he was also released from jail. Nutsubidze finished the fourth complete translation of "The Knight in the Panther's Skin" into Russian on May 1, 1939, which was sent to Stalin.

Nutsubidze and Sergey Kavtaradze personally met Stalin on October 20, 1940. Ioseb Jughashvili revised the poem, provided the translator one Strophe of his translation, and the work was published the following year, with the edition by S. Gorodetsky, which included a preface by Sergo Kavtaradze and illustrations by Mihály Zichy, Sergo Kobuladze, and Irakli Toidze. The translation was published in mass circulation by "Goslitizdat", although the translator did not get an honorarium. According to Nutsubidze's declaration, the honorarium was completely credited to the Defense Fund.

Following Stalin's death in 1953 and the fall of Lavrenty Beria's power Nutsubidze was expelled from the Academy of Sciences of the Georgian SSR on December 22, 1938, and three days later from Tbilisi State University. Nutsubidze's works, "History of Georgian Philosophy" and "Rustaveli and the Eastern Renaissance", were published before 1960, but he was limited to full-fledged scientific and educational activity. From 1956 to 1960, he worked as a senior researcher at the Institute of Philosophy of the Academy of Sciences of the Georgian SSR, and in 1960, he received full rehabilitation from the prosecutions of the USSR, and his scientific status was restored.

== Scientific research ==
Nutsubidze's scientific works are diversified. His works are sometimes separated into two periods: the metaphysical period and the history of Georgian philosophy. The first phase includes four works aiming to establishing a new system in philosophy: "Bolzano and Theory of Science" (1913), "Fundamentals of Alethiology" (1922), "Truth and the Structure of Cognition" (1926), and "Philosophy and Wisdom" (1931).

Nutsubidze's publications address pedagogical themes ("The Idea of Man and the Problem of Upbringing in The Knight in the Panther's Skin", "Education and Education Ideas in the Georgian Renaissance", etc.") the system of higher education and scientific degrees in ancient Georgia, dialectical and formal logic and Georgian culture. Nutsubidze's work "Theory of Art (Fundamentals of Monistic Aesthetics)" (1929) was the first Georgian work in this field.

Nutsubidze authored school and university textbooks, philosophical terminology, and translated treasures of Georgian poetry into foreign languages, among other things. He established the groundwork for the development of Georgian philosophical terminology with Dimitri Uznadze.

=== Alethiology ===
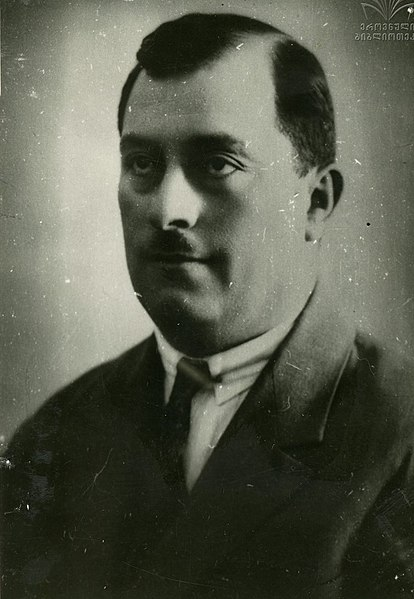
Nutsubidze

Nutsubidze set the groundwork for the original philosophical system, Alethiology, while working in Germany in 1911–1914. In Leipzig in 1911, he read a report on the principles of Alethiology. In 1913, he published "Bolzano and Theory of Science" in Russian, and in 1922, he published "Fundamentals of Alethhiology, Part I. The Problem of Cognition" in Tbilisi. In Germany, the book "Truth and the Structure of Cognition: The First Introduction to Alethiologian Realism" was released in German.

Nutsubidze's second book, "Philosophie und Weisheit" ("Philosophy and Wisdom") was published in German in 1931. "The First Introduction to Alethiologian Realism", first published in 1927, was "a specific introduction to Alethiologian Realism". Nutsubidze defined Alethiology as the field that exists between essence and thought. He remarked that his Alethiologian reduction differed from Ziggvart's reduction approach in that it was rationally comprehended, as well as from Husserl's phenomenological reductions.

Nutsubidze's articles published in German drew a lot of attention in Western philosophical journals. Many reviews of his works have been appeared in Germany, England, Switzerland, and France. Bruno Bauch, a German Neo-Kantian philosopher, earned favorable reviews as well, and both volumes were highly appreciated by Kurt Gassen. In 1932, Bartholomeus Landheer published a review in the International Journal of Ethics in which he stated that Nutsubidze had made a substantial contribution to the simple solution of tough difficulties of the modern philosophy. Konstantine Bakradze, a Georgian philosopher, responded to one of the works, and his letter, "The Problem of Truth and the Structure of Cognition", was published in the magazine "Mnatobi" in 1928.

=== History of Georgian Philosophy ===
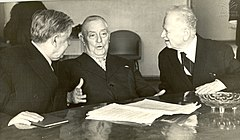
Nutsubidze with Simon Kaukhchishvili and Akaki Shanidze in 1967

Nutsubidze was denied the right to continue teaching philosophy at Tbilisi State University after his return from Germany in 1930. He began studying the history of Georgian philosophy in the 1930s, laying the groundwork for a new branch of Kartvelian studies, the history of Georgian philosophy. His publications on the eastern roots of the Renaissance, as well as the identities of the Pseudo-Dionysius the Areopagite and Peter the Iberian, are particularly noteworthy. This hypothesis was proposed by Nutsubidze in 1942. A similar finding was reached ten years later by a Belgian scientist, E. Honigman.

Nutsubidze and the renowned philologist Simon Kaukhchishvili devised a comprehensive plan for publishing old Georgian philosophical artifacts. They released "განმარტებაი პროკლესთვის დიადოხოსისა და პლატონურისა ფილოსოფიისათვის" in 1937, which comprised high-level searchings as well as Georgian-Greek and Greek-Georgian dictionaries. This book not only offered a scientific study of an important representative of Georgian philosophical thought, but it also increased interest in Georgian philosophical thought.

Nutsubidze's two-volume "History of Georgian Philosophy" was published in 1956–1958, and it covers the history of Georgian philosophy from the ancient mythological epic poetry to Solomon Dodashvili. Nutsubidze had already dedicated several works to the Georgian mythological epic. He researched and translated "Amirani's Epic".

Nutsubidze recognized three periods in history of Georgian philosophical thought: the Ancient Age (from the Kolkheti High Rhetorical and Philosophical School through 6th-7th centuries), the Feudal Age (8th-18th centuries), and the age of Capitalism (19th-20th centuries). Further, the Feudal era was divided into three periods: early feudalism (8th-11th centuries), feudal absolutism (11th-12th centuries), and late feudalism (13th-18th centuries).

Nutsubidze also researched Georgian cultural concerns. He devoted numerous letters to the inscriptions of Georgian monasteries discovered in Palestine and the construction of monasteries associated with the name of Peter the Iberian. He was particularly interested in the Georgian "Balahvariani". Hermann Zottenberg published a research in 1886 in which he demonstrated that the work did not belong to John of Damascus. Nutsubidze released a study in Russian titled "On the Origins of the Greek Book Barlaam and Joasaph" 70 years later, in which he addressed the subject of the author of the Greek novel and attacked Franz Joseph Dölger's opinion. According to Nutsubidze, the Greek novel is based on Georgian manuscript. He deduced that the author of "Balavariani" and "Limonari" is the same person, and the author of the first edition of the works is the same person, a famous figure of the 7th century, Ioane Moskhi.

=== Rustvelology ===
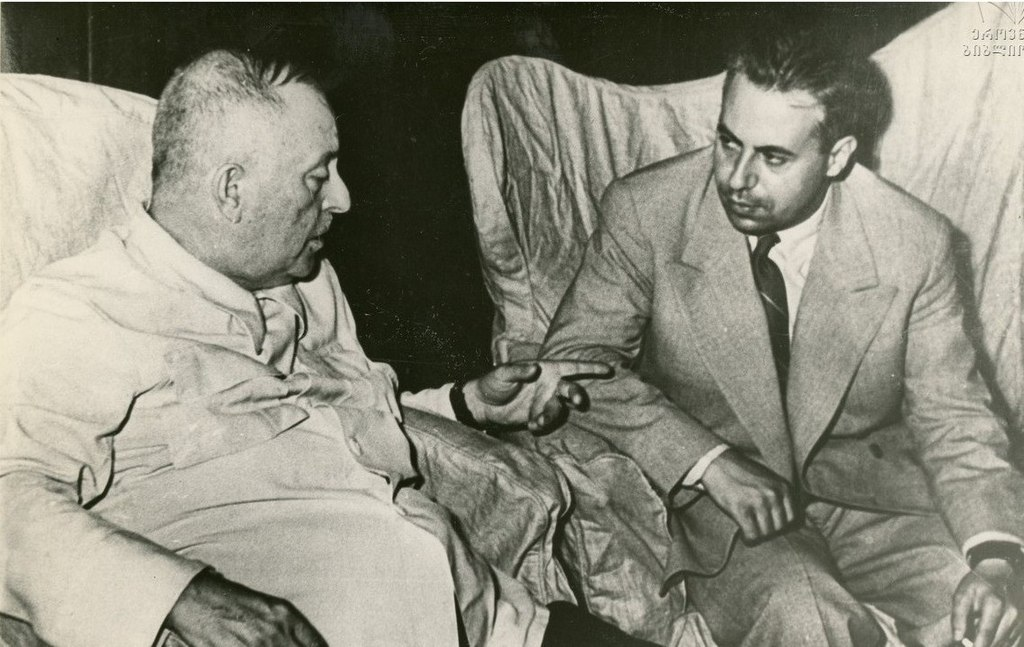
Nutsubidze with V. Kerbach, who translated "The Knight in the Panther's Skin" into Romanian language

Very considerable is Nutsubidze's contribution to Rustvelology. Rustaveli hels a special place in his research not only from the viewpoint of the poet's philosophical outlook, but also as a great humanist of his time.

Russian translation of "The Knight in the Panther's Skin" by Nutsubidze in 1937-1940 is widely regarded as one of the greatest. According to Alexey Tolstoy, Nutsubidze's translation of "The Knight in the Panther's Skin" is "not only a scientific work, but also a poetic work", and with rhythm rotation the translator solved the problem of translating the dactyl lines into Russian language.

Nutsubidze's translation was the first utilized in the translation of various languages: Victor Kerbach in Romanian language, Igor Sikiri in Polish language, Ipey Fukuro in Japanese language, and Sergi Tsuladze in French (which is considered one of the best French translations of the poem). Nutsubidze also backed Maria Pritvits' and Austrian poet Hugo Huppert's German translations.

Nutsubidze's monographic work "The Work of Rustsveli" provides a multifaceted, in-depth analysis of the poem. The author's objective was to shed light on the great poet's cultural context, which included a tangle of complicated issues ranging from socioeconomic and political situations to the popular, literary, and philosophical sources of "The Knight in the Panther's Skin". According to him, the poem's origins should be traced primarily along three lines: Broadly speaking, Rustaveli's poetry was prepared by Georgian folk Traditions and the history of Georgian philosophy, in connection with its literary forefathers.

== Later life ==
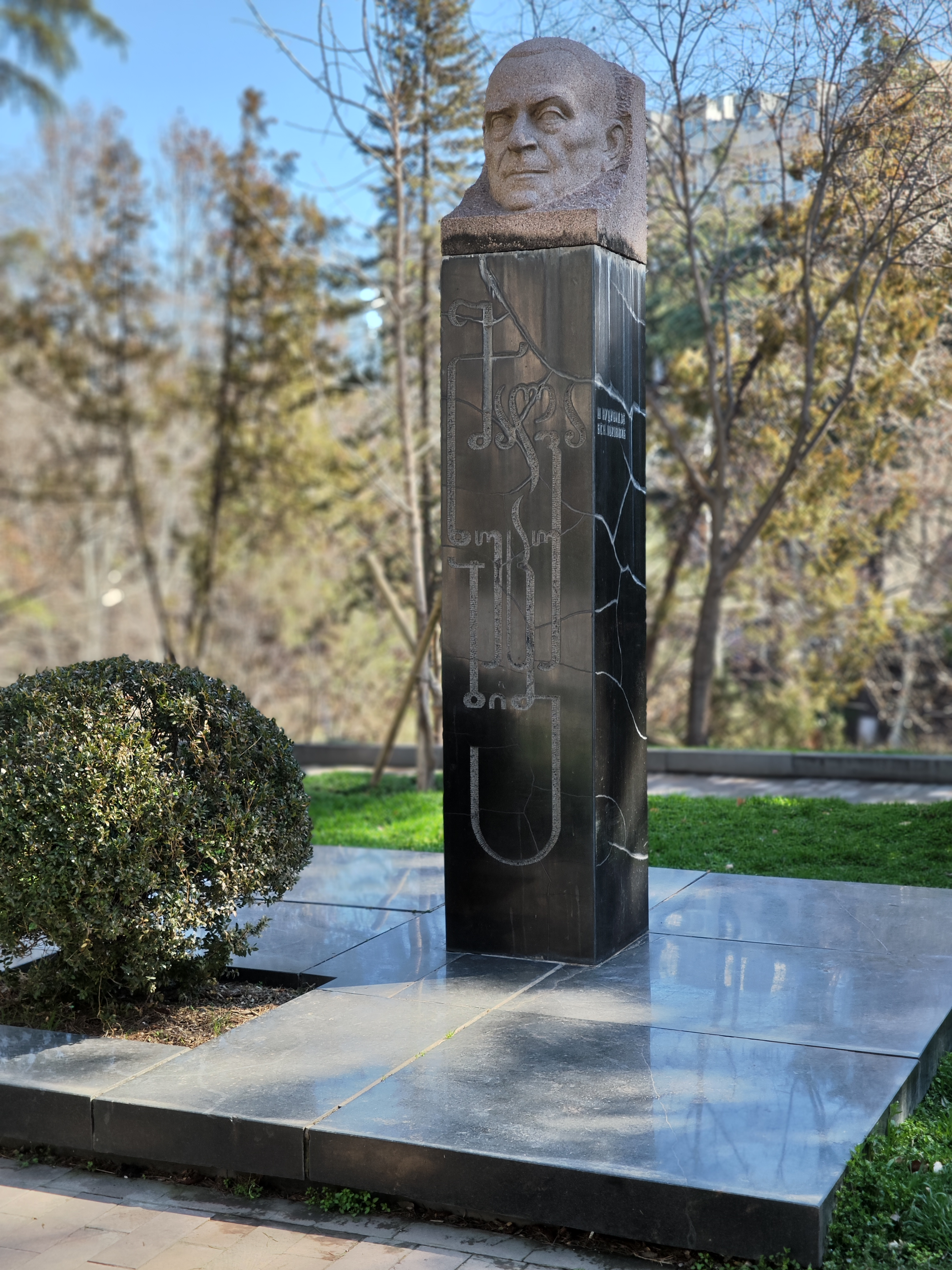
Nutsubidze's grave in the yard of Tbilisi State University

Nutsubidze was named Honored scientist of the Georgian Soviet Socialist Republic in 1963. He continued to teach at Tbilisi State University in 1967. During this time, he focused primarily on the history of medieval European philosophy.

Nutsubidze was not allowed to participate in Rustaveli's jubilee in 1966, nor was he allowed to attend meetings with foreign guests or speak. He was not permitted to give a speech at the 50th anniversary of Tbilisi State University in 1968.

Nutsubidze died in Tbilisi on January 6, 1969, aged 80. On January 9, he was laid to rest in the Tbilisi State University Pantheon. On the scientist's grave is a statue created by Otar Parulava.

== Personal life ==
Nutsubidze was married twice. Agnessa Filipova, the first wife, was born in a Georgian Catholic family. She died from a tuberculosis in 1937. Ketevan, the couple's daughter, was born in 1915. Nutsubidze was still alive when his first daughter died.

Nutsubidze married for the second time at the age of 56 to Ketevan Klimiashvili, a divorcee with two children, Zakro and Rusudan. Nutsubidze treated them as if they were his own children. The couple were the parents of three kids. At the age of five, the first son died from diphtheria.

Nutsubidze had an unusual approach to religion. He did not attend church. He remembered many prayers he had learned in the gymnasium by heart and knew divine law so well that even his friend, Catholicos-Patriarch Kalistrate Tsintsadze, was taken aback. Ephraim II of Georgia frequently discussed theological issues with him.

== Legacy ==
In 1969, Nutsubidze Street was named after him. Saburtalo plateau is also named after him in Tbilisi. Aside from the Tbilisi State University Pantheon, Nutsubidze's monument can be found in the garden of Nutsubidze Street.

Phido Nadibaidze, Archil Begiashvili, Guram Tevzadze, and others have published works about Nutsubidze's Aletheologian Realism. His The Theory of Art has received little attention.

Tamaz and Tamar Nutsubidze donated Nutsubidze's private library to Tbilisi State University Library in 2013. It contains 635 library units with 594 names.

== Organizations and associations ==
- Tbilisi State University (1918)
- Constituent Assembly of Georgia (1919–1921)
- Georgian National Academy of Sciences (1944–1953, 1960–1969)

== Awards and honours ==
- Order of the Red Banner of Labour

== Works ==
- 1926: „Wahrheit und Erkenntnisstruktur. Erste Einleitung in den aletheiologischen Realismus“. Berlin und Leipzig: Walter de Gruyter.
- 1931: „Philosophie und Weisheit. Spezielle Einleitung in die Aletheiologie“. Berlin und Königsberg: Ost-Europa-Verlag.
- 1957: „Шота Руставели, Витязь в Тигровой Шкуре“. Тбилиси.
- 1973: „Bolzano and the Theory of Science: The Principles of the Alethology.“ Vol. 1. [Ed. Sh. Khidasheli]. Tbilisi: Metsniereba.
- 1974: „An Introduction to Philosophy (The Problem of Knowledge). Vol. 3. The Theory of Art. [Ed. A. Begiashvili]. Tbilisi: Metsniereba.
- 1975: „Peter the Iberian and the Philosophical Legacy of Antiquity.“ Vol. 5. [Ed. N Natadze]. Tbilisi: Metsniereba.
- 1976: „Rustaveli and the Oriental Renaissance.“ Vol. 4. [Ed. Sh. Khidasheli]. Tbilisi: Metsniereba.
- 1977: „Toward the Origin of the Greek Romance „Barlaam and Joasaph“.“ Vol. 6. [Ed. N. Natadze]. Tbilisi: Metsniereba.
- 1979: „Truth and the Structure of Knowledge. Philosophy and Wisdom.“ Vol. 2. [Ed. T. Buachidze]. Tbilisi: Metsniereba.
- 1980: „The Work of Rustaveli.“ Vol. 7. [Ed. Al. Baramidze]. Tbilisi: Metsniereba.
- 1983: „The History of Georgian Philosophy: Book 1.“ [Ed. Sh. Khidasheli]. Tbilisi: Metsniereba.
- 1985: „The History of Georgian Philosophy: Book 2.“ [Ed. Sh. Khidasheli]. Tbilisi: Metsniereba.

== Bibliography ==
- Bakradze, A. (1971). From the History of One Russian Translation of the Knight in The Panther's Skin. Tbilisi: Metsiereba. pp. 373–379.
- Barkava, M., Dolidze, E. (1986). Shalva Nutsubidze (1888-1969): Biobibliography. Tbilisi: Metsiereba. ISBN 978-9941-0-9318-0.
- Belkania, T. (2018). Several Documents Concerning Shalva Nutsubidze Archived at the Special Archive of the Ministry of Internal Affairs of Georgia. Actual Problems of Kartvelology, VII. Tbilisi: Georgian University. P. 16–22. ISSN 1987-930X.
- Iremadze, T. (2008). DER ALETHEIOLOGISCHE REALISMUS: Schalwa Nuzubidse und seine neuen Denkansätze. [ed. G. Tevzadze. L. Zakaradze]. Tbilisi: Verlag „Nekeri“. ISBN 978-9941-436-81-9.
- Jeck, U. R. (2010). Schalwa Nuzubidse, ein deutsch-georgischer Philosoph des 20. Jabrbunderts. In: Erläuterungen zur georgischen Philosophie. [ed. G. Tevzadze]. Tbilisi: Verlag „Nekeri“. ISBN 978-9941-416-36-1. p. 70-81.
- Kakulia, N. [ed.]. (2018). Freedom for one Promise: Shalva Nutsubidze 130. Tbilisi: Tbilisi State University.
- Khidasheli, Sh. (1989). Shalva Nutsubidze: Life and Work. Tbilisi: Tbilisi University Press.
- Khvadagiani, I. (2016). Constituent Assembly of Georgia 1919. Tbilisi: Soviet Past Research Laboratory. p. 320-323. ISBN 978-9941-0-9318-0.
- Makharadze, M. [ed.]. (2013). History of Georgian Philosophical Thoughts, IV. Tbilisi: Universal. ISBN 978-9941-22-007-4.
- Megreidze, I. (1980). Unforgettable Shalva Nutsubidze . Ciskari. 3(274). Tbilisi. p. 148-152.
- Nutsubidze, K. (1988). Shalva Nutsubidze. Tbilisi: Nakaduli.
