= Gia Getsadze =

Georgian government official

Gia Getsadze გია გეწაძე
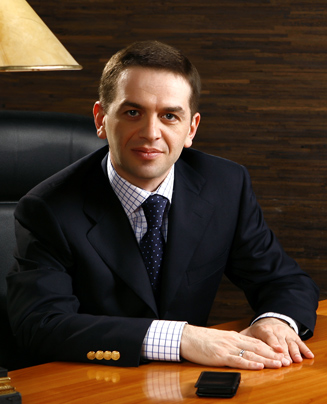

Personal details
- Born: 21 December 1968 (age 57) Samtredia, Georgia

Gia Getsadze (Georgian: გია გეწაძე, born 21 December 1968 in Samtredia, Georgia) is a former Deputy Minister of Justice of Ukraine.

Gia Getsadze is one of the founders of the Young Lawyers' Association of Georgia. From 1995 to 2000 he worked in various state institutions and participated in drafting of the Law "On the Constitutional Court of Georgia". After the Rose Revolution in 2003 he was appointed as the First Deputy Minister of Justice of Georgia. During 2003–2005 he held various political positions in the government. During 2004–2005 he was a governor of Imereti. In 2005 he left the civil service and established the Law Office "Getsadze&Pateishvili LP". In July 2014 he became a dean of the Law Department in the Ilia State University. Gia Getsadze is an independent member of the State Constitutional Commission of Georgia. On 4 February 2015 he was appointed as the Deputy Minister of Justice of Ukraine on combating corruption. He also coordinates and supervises the activities of the Department of cooperation with NGOs and international organizations, Personnel Commission of the Ministry of Justice of Ukraine and the Reforms' Committee.

One of the fundamental reforms implemented by The Ministry of Justice in 2015 was the reform in the sphere of state registration of business and real estate. Procedures and terms of state registration had been simplified. Due to this reform Ukraine moved ahead in the ranking of Doing Business.

The Committee on consideration of complaints in state registration has been founded in order to prevent illegal takeovers. This new progressive institute is headed and coordinated by the Deputy Minister of Justice Pavlo Moroz.

In February 2018 Gia Getsadze left position of deputy justice minister of Ukraine and initiated the campaign with the aim of practical implementation of latest technology in daily life. His first initiative was to create legal support mechanisms for Blockchain technology. He proposed to develop the “Blockchain Constitution” to support the establishment of global legal infrastructure for the digital world in the future.

After Russia's military aggression against Ukraine, together with his Ukrainian partners, he founded the law firm Rasons Legal, which actively lobbies for the establishment of Ukrainian port cities as free economic zones, where the principles of common law and laws of England and Wales will apply to the business deals.

== Education ==
Complete higher education, graduated from the Department of International law and International relations, Ivane Javakhishvili Tbilisi State University in 1995, specialty – International law. Graduated from the Department of Humanitarian Studies, Ivane Javakhishvili Tbilisi State University in 1995, specialty – Journalism.

== Professional experience ==
1994–1995 – Intern, Legal Department of the Ministry of Foreign Affairs of Georgia.

1995–1996 – Assistant to the Professor of the Greifswald University, Germany.

1996–1997 – Senior Assistant to the Chairman of the Constitutional Court of Georgia.

1997–1999 – Legal Advisor of the National Security Council of Georgia.

2000–2001 – Senior Legal Advisor, AMEX International Co; USAID Rule of Law project.

2001–2003 – Senior Legal Advisor, Director of the IRIS Georgia; USAID Rule of Law project.

2003–2004 – First Deputy Minister of Justice of Georgia.

2004 – Secretary of the High Council of Justice of Georgia.

2004–2005 – Deputy Minister of Internal Affairs of Georgia.

2005–2006 – Governor of Imereti region.

since 2006 – Partner of the Law Office "Partner".

2006–2015 – Partner of the Law Office "Getsadze&Pateishvili LP".

2013–2015 – Member of the State Constitutional Commission of Georgia.

2014–2015 – Dean of the Law Department, Professor of the Ilia State University, Georgia.

2015 – 2018 – Deputy Minister of Justice of Ukraine.

From 2022 – Founder and senior partner an Rasons Legal.
