= Agniashvili =

Agniashvili (Georgian: აღნიაშვილი) is a Georgian surname. Notable people with the name include:

- Levan Aghniashvili (Georgian: ლევან აღნიაშვილი; 1897–1937), Georgian lawyer and Professor of Law, member of the revolutionary movement in Georgia and South Caucasus; Rector of Tbilisi State University from April 1933 to July 1935
- Pyotr Agniashvili (Georgian: პეტრე აღნიაშვილი; 1896–1937), Georgian lawyer, member of the revolutionary movement in Georgia and South Caucasus; Communist Party member from 1916
- Vladimir Agniashvili (Georgian: ვლადიმერ აღნიაშვილი; 1860–1904), Georgian teacher, public figure, linguistically and lexicographer, ethnographer, folklorist and publicist
