= Georgian manuscripts of Saint Paul's letters =

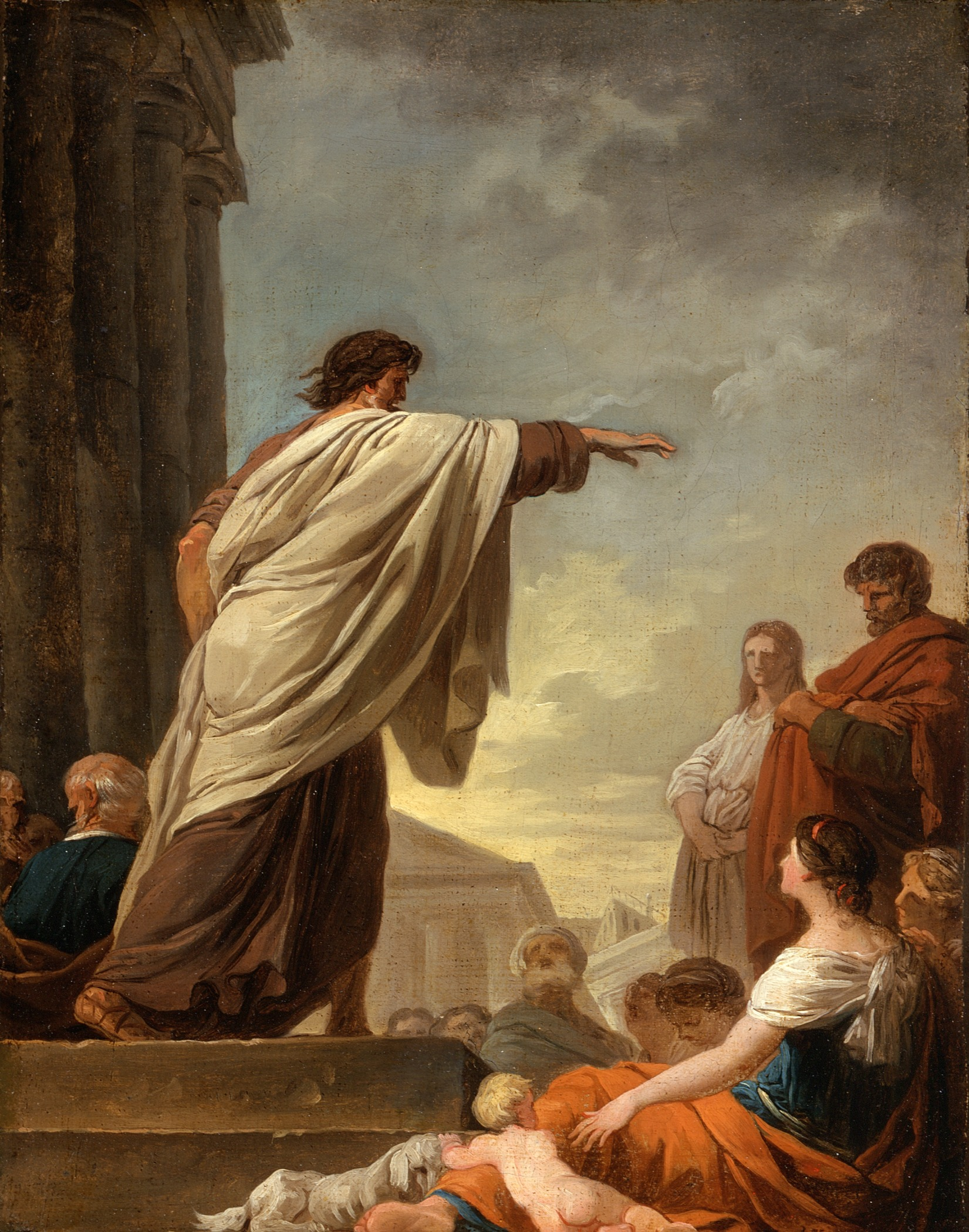
Paul the Apostle

Paul's epistles are Paul the Apostle's letters, which are among the most important parts of New Testament. In those letters are told old Christian dogmas, which preceded the development of the religion. The first versions of The epistles are preserved in the form of manuscripts. They are created between 10th-14th centuries in various churches and monasteries. Under those circumstances, they differ from each other both sides in content (structural) and morphological-orthographic. As soon as the state symbols were formed in Georgia, the country chose the European path, striving for its values. In the second and third centuries, Christianity evolved in Europe, which changed their political life as well. Therefore, for Georgia, Christianity was not only a precondition for religion but also for political stability.

Various historical sources provide information that there were many centres of Christianity in Kartli before 376 AD. From that time on, the translation of the Bible into the native language was to begin, although there were various obstacles, such as being under the authority of the Church of Antioch, and so on.

The oldest Georgian manuscripts date back to the ninth century, but scholars doubt that there may have been various Christian texts translated into Georgian centuries ago. Given these facts, the spread of Christian culture was important for Georgia. The translation of Paul's epistles is part of this large-scale process.

The descriptions of the manuscripts were made by Ilia Abuladze, Ana Bakradze, Elene Metreveli, Tsatsa Chankievi, Rusudan Gvaramia, Lili Khevsuriani, Lali Jghamaia, Robert Pierpont Blake, Tedo Zhordania, Ivane Javakhishivili, Alexander Tsagareli, Evsevi Nikoladze, Nikolai Marr, Tamar Bregadze, Mikheil Kavtaria, Lili Kuthatheladze, Tsiala Kakhabrishvili, Thamila Mgaloblishvili and Korneli Kekelidze.

== Establishment of critical text ==
=== History ===
In order to preserve the historical heritage, it became essential to ascertain a critical text based on the Georgian manuscripts of Paul's epistles. Academician Akaki Shanidze headed the case. Description of the manuscripts was started by Ketevan Dzotsenidze, Head of the Georgian Language Department of the Kutaisi Pedagogical Institute, but due to her active pedagogical activity, and then because of chronic disease, she was not able to complete the initiated scientific research. After that, Ketevan Dzotsenidze's student and Akaki Shanidze's assistant professor Korneli Danelia continued working on the manuscripts.

=== Editions ===
The manuscripts of the Epistles differ from each other because of the period of their creation. Also, we ought to take into account the difference in sources. Approximately similar manuscripts were grouped, thus there were obtained their 4 - A, B, C and D editions. The two lists are relatively early, while the other two are new. The A edition is the oldest. By its processing was obtained the B. C and D redactions are based on the B.

== The Manuscripts of the edition A ==
The edition A consists of two manuscripts Ⴀ and Ⴊ. Both are of the same type, but quite different from manuscripts of the B edition.

== The Manuscript Ⴀ ==
=== Description ===
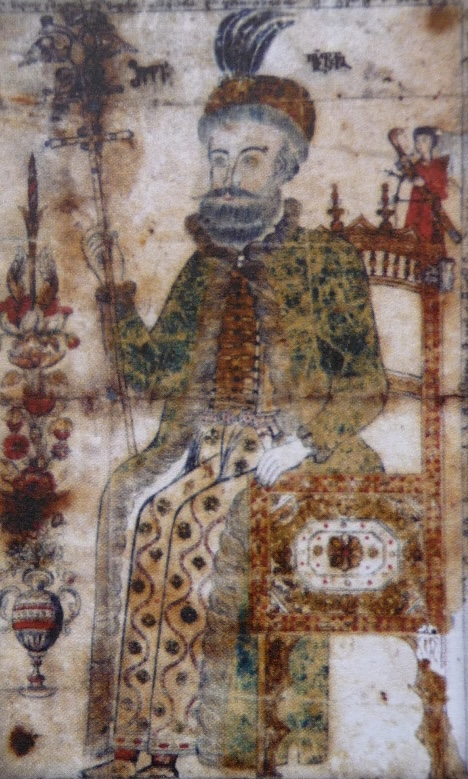
Vakhtang VI

The manuscript has a faded leather-covered stamped-wooden binding; it is written on a parchment; it contains 265 sheets, size 25,2X21,3 cm. It is written in the Mrglovani script in two columns in black ink, while the titles and special places are written in red ink; the size of the text is 18.5-19X13.5 cm; the distance between the columns is 1.5 cm; there are 23 lines in the column on pages 1–25 and 20 on the rest of the pages. The entire text is handwritten by one person, although the identity of the copyist is unknown as it has no colophons that might have been lost. The notebooks are paginated in Georgian letters. There are 10 sheets in the 24th notebook and 8-8 in the rest. In the manuscript, we also find a miniature of St. Paul (31v).The first notebook lacks a title page; two, the 16th (pp. 119–120) and the 34th (pp. 257–258) notebooks, are completely lost; the manuscript on the 35th notebook is terminated; how many pages of the manuscript are lost is undetermined.

The manuscript begins with Euthale's stoichiometry (1 r-30v), which refers only to epistles; then comes directly the Epistles of Paul (35 r-185v). The following are: The Epistle of James (256v-257v), 1 Peter (258 r-262v), 2 Peter (263r-265v). The Manuscript from Paul's epistles contains:

1. Epistle to the Romans (32r-61v);
2. First Epistle to the Corinthians (61 v-88r);
3. Second Epistle to the Corinthians (88 r-106r);
4. Epistle to the Galatians (106 r-115r);
5. Epistle to the Ephesians (115v-119v);
6. Epistle to the Philippians (120 r-123v);
7. Epistle to the Colossians (124r-137r);
8. First Epistle to the Thessalonians (131 r-137v);
9. Second Epistle to the Thessalonians (137 v-141r);
10. Epistle to the Hebrews (141 r-166r);
11. First Epistle to Timothy (166 r-175v);
12. First Epistle to Timothy (175 v-180v);
13. Epistle to Titus (181 r-185r);
14. Epistle to Philemon (185 r).

=== History ===
The manuscript dates to the second half of the tenth century, although it also has later colophons (31 r). One of them is: "The river of wisdom, the abyss of tutelage, the lyre of this power, Paul, be my ally, Amen." Therefore, the colophon was made in 1700, and the author is King Vakhtang VI. The manuscript is kept in the S fund of the Korneli Kekelidze Georgian National Centre of Manuscripts. (S 407).

== The Manuscript Ⴊ ==
=== Description ===
The manuscript does not have a cover; It is written on a parchment; it contains around 147 sheets, size 25X20 cm; it is written in the Nuskhuri script in two columns in black ink, while the titles and special places are written in red ink. The size of the text is 18X12,5 cm; the distance between the columns is 1.5 cm; here are 20 lines in the column. The entire text is handwritten by one person, although the identity of the copyist is unknown as it has no colophons that might have been lost. The notebooks are paginated in Georgian letters. There are 8-8 sheets in the notebooks. The manuscript begins with the 16th notebook and the last is the 34th. Therefore, many pages are missing. The manuscript begins with the Epistles of Paul (1 r-76r) and then the Acts of the Apostles (77 r-146v). The Manuscript from Paul's epistles contains:

1. Epistle to the Ephesians (1r-11r);
2. Epistle to the Philippians (11 v-18r);
3. Epistle to the Colossians (18r-25r);
4. First epistle to the Thessalonians (25 r-31r);
5. Second epistle to the Thessalonians (31 r-39v);
6. Epistle to the Hebrews (40 r-57r);
7. First epistle to the Timothy (57 v-65r);
8. Second epistle to the Timothy (65 v-71r);
9. Epistle to Titus (71 v-74v);
10. Epistle to Philemon (75 r-76r).

=== History ===
Many pages of the Manuscript are missing, so it is not possible to identify its copyist or obtain any other information about it, although it has a few colophons, one of which introduces us to the name of the sponsor - Theodore.

1. "Praise the Lord, the cause of all good, Paul has died. Jesus Christ, bless Theodore, a slave of both your natures."(76v);
2. "God rest Tadeoz's soul" (45 v);
3. "The mercy of Paul and Peter Apostles, help the most sinful of sinners, Ioane Datuadze. And God protect my parents, amen. St. George, help and protect them. St. Mary, do not get rid of them"(76v-77r);
4. "God bless the writer Job. The deacon did a good deed, Amen and Kyrie Eleison" (97v-99r);
5. "God, have mercy on a very sinful Iase, God have mercy" (1r).

The manuscript is kept in the S fund of the Korneli Kekelidze National Center of Manuscripts. (S 1398).

== The Manuscripts of the edition B ==
The edition A consists of four manuscripts Ⴁ, Ⴂ, Ⴃ and Ⴄ.

== The Manuscript Ⴁ ==
=== Description ===
The manuscript has a leather-covered cardboard's binding; it is written on a parchment; it contains 180 sheets, size 24X21,4 cm. it is written in a Nuskhuri script in two columns; the titles are written in red ink; pages of the manuscript are missing; The lower part of the 28th sheet is damaged, and the right side of the 91st and 92nd sheets. The manuscript begins with Euthale's stoichiometry(1v-25v), the first page (1 r) has been deleted and cannot be read; then comes directly the Epistles of Paul (26r-179v); The Manuscript from Paul's epistles contains:

Epistle to the Romans (25r-57r);

First Epistle to the Corinthians (57r-86v)

Second Epistle to the Corinthians (86v-110r);

Epistle to the Galatians (110r-121r);

Epistle to the Ephesians (121r-128r)

Epistle to the Philippians (128rv);

Epistle to the Colossians (128v-136v);

First Epistle to the Thessalonians (136v-143v);

Second Epistle to the Thessalonians (143v-149v);

Epistle to the Hebrews (149v-176r);

First Epistle to Timothy (176r-179v).

=== History ===
The manuscript dates to the tenth century; it has the colophon which introduces us to the name of the copyist – Gabriel. " God, have mercy on Gabriel". We can also see some textual references (37 v, 38v, 39r, 101v, 102 r, 103 r) made by Tedo Zhordania. There are also other colophons:

"A kind reminder of your son, George. Now in peace." (39r);

"To Son of Almishar, Theodore. We will announce this to his highness, my child was born and no one is merciful." (39v);

"To Imnadze. On the way to Natlgh, I have met by a black-hearted man." (149r).

There are some colophons on the following pages: 21v, 39v, 30r, 85r, 131v, 132r, 133v, 165r, 180rv..

== The Manuscript Ⴂ ==
=== Description ===
The manuscript is written on a parchment; it contains around 173 sheets, size 40X25 cm. It is written in the Mrglovani script in two columns in black ink, while the titles are written in red ink. The size of the text is 34X20,5 cm; the distance between the columns is 1.5 cm. The entire text is handwritten by one person, although the identity of the copyist is unknown as it has no colophons that might have been lost. Some of the sheets are very damaged. The manuscript begins with gospel, then comes Euthale's stichometry (87r-95v) and the epistles of Paul (96r-164v), the last is the Acts of the Apostles (165r-173v). The following are missing from the Paul's epistles:

Epistle to the Romans (2,20-3,20; 6,19-9,13; 11,18-12,11; 14,3-16);

First Epistle to the Corinthians (1,1-1,21; 7,8-9,8; 14,11-14,39);

Epistle to the Galatians (4,7-5,11);

Epistle to the Philippians (3,17-4,23)

First Epistle to the Thessalonians (4,4-5,11);

Second Epistle to the Thessalonians (1,12-3,6);

Epistle to the Hebrews (6,4-7,7);

First Epistle to Timothy (5,4-6,2);

Epistle to Titus (2-3);

Epistle to Philemon (entirely).

=== History ===
The manuscript dates back to the first half of the eleventh century; On the 115v page there is copyist's colophon:

"Lord Jesus Christ, forgive all sins of high-priest Zakaria, settle him among the saints, blessed spirit of theirs, amen."

The mentioned person must be Zakaria Valashkerteli.

== The Manuscript Ⴃ ==
=== Description ===
The manuscript is written on a parchment; it contains 178 sheets, size 20X14,5 (25,5X20,5); It is written in a Mrglovani script in two columns, each with twenty-three lines. It does not include titled chapters or subheadings. The manuscript begins with the Paul's epistles, then comes the Acts of the Apostles(33r-118v) and The Epistle of James (118v-121v). The manuscript has not got a stichometry. The following are missing from the Paul's epistles:

Epistle to the Romans;

First Epistle to the Corinthians;

Second Epistle to the Corinthians(1-2,10);

First Epistle to the Thessalonians(4,11-5,28);

Second Epistle to the Thessalonians;

Epistle to the Hebrews(1-5,5).

=== History ===
The manuscript dates back to 977. It has the colophon which introduces us to the sponsor (Kvirike Mindzadzoreli) and to the copyist (Kvirike Sokhastereli). The manuscript is from the Georgian collection of Mount Sinai. Documents N58, N31 and N60 of the collection are considered to be part of the manuscript.

== The Manuscript Ⴄ ==
=== Description ===
Inserted in a cardboard cover; it is written on a parchment; it contains 237 sheets, size 22,3X17,2 cm. It is written in the earlier Mrglovani script in two columns in black ink, while the titles and special places are written in red ink. The distance between the columns is 1.8 cm. There are 23 rows in each column. The size of the text is 18,2x11,8 cm. The entire text is handwritten by one person, although the identity of the copyist is unknown. The manuscript begins with the Paul's epistles (1r-124r), the comes the Acts of the Apostles (124r-194v) and the catholic epistles (194v-222r). The following are missing from the Paul's epistles: Epistle to the Romans (5,2-10,13). As Ⴃ this manuscript has not got a stoichiometry and chapters or subheadings are not titled.

=== History ===
The manuscript has got the colophon which introduces us to the name of the sponsor, the place and the time of writing. The sponsor was Michael, the place of writing was Ulumbo, the time of writing is the reign of Nikephoros II Phokas Phocas and the patriarchate of Polyeuctus (the 960s). The manuscript is from the Georgian collection of the Iviron Monastery.

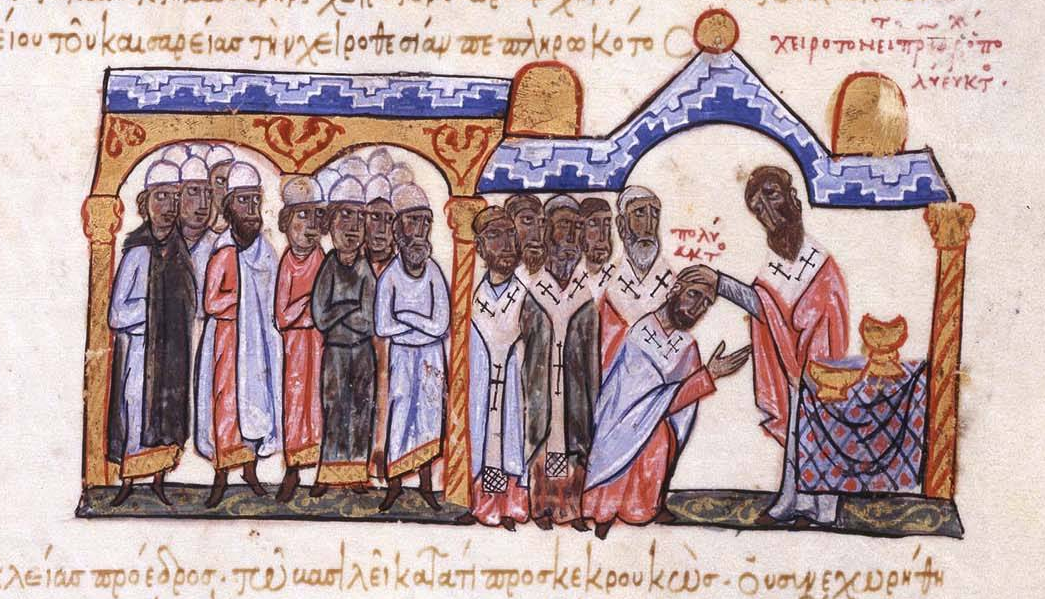
Consecration of Patriarch Polyeuctus

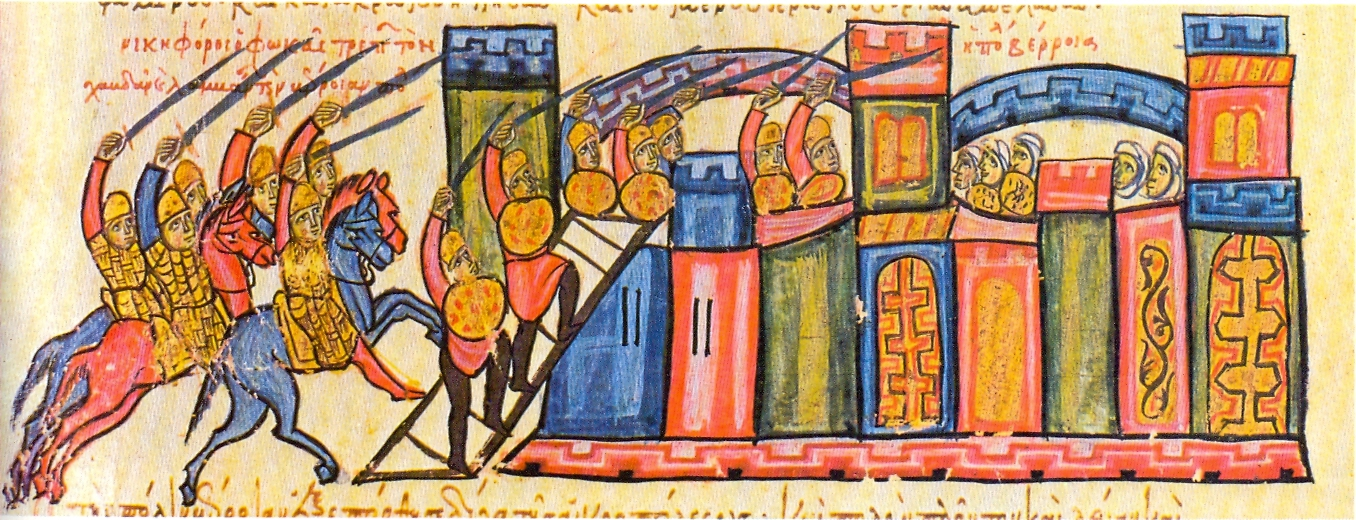
Phokas captures Halep 962

== The manuscripts of the edition C ==
The C (Giorgian) edition includes three manuscripts - Ⴅ, Ⴆ and Ⴡ. The manuscripts of this group are slightly different from each other and the difference is only orthographic . This edition is based on the Giorgi Mtatsmindeli's translation.

== The manuscript Ⴅ ==
=== Description ===
The manuscript has a faded leather-covered stamped-wooden binding; It has left only one lock. it contains 265 sheets, of which 249 are late parchment and 16 are earlier paper. It is written in the Mrglovani script in one column in black ink, while the titles and special places are written in red ink. The size of the text is 12X7 cm. Page contains 25-26 lines. The manuscript begins with the Acts of the Apostles (1r-67v), then comes Catholic Epistles (67v-98v) and the last is the Letters of Paul(100r-228v). The Stichiometry is divided into each epistle. With such a structure it differs from the manuscripts of the old edition. The manuscript also contains 8 small works.

=== History ===
The manuscript has two colophons A(by writer) and B(by translator).

A. The colophon of Giorgi Mtatsmindeli: "Holy Fathers, this holy book that teaches everyone, I translated by the order of the head of the Mtsatsminda, Giorgi;

B. The colophon of George the lesser I wrote the third one from the second translation created from the first translation of Giorgi Mtatsmindeli.

The manuscript was donated by Archmandrite Taras to the Kvatakhevi Monastery in 1864, which is clear from its own inscription.The manuscript is kept in the S fund of the Korneli Kekelidze National Center of Manuscripts (A 584).

== The manuscript Ⴆ ==
=== Description ===
The manuscript is written in the Nuskhuri script in one column . It contains 231 sheets.

=== History ===
The manuscript dates back to the eleventh century. The translator and editor of the manuscript was Giorgi Mtatsmindeli and the sponsor was Nikola. There is no copyist named, however, according to Corneli Danelia, Nicola must be a copyist as well, as he speaks in the first person in various colophons.

== The Manuscript Ⴡ ==
=== Description ===
The manuscript has a leather-covered damaged binding (back cover of book is missing); it is written on a parchment, but late sheets are paper; the parchment is very damaged, Several sheets are cut and torn (45, 96-106). It contains 252 sheets (225 parchments and 17 papers(226-252 pp.), size 23X17 cm. A size of a text is 17X12,5 cm. It is written in Nuskhuri script in one column, which contains 24-25 rows. The titles are written in red ink. The manuscript contains: The acts of the Apostles (1r-63v), the Catholic epistles (63v-95r) and the epistles of Paul(95r-225r).

=== History ===
The manuscript dates back to the 13th century. There have several colophons relating to negotiations between Nikozian bishops and kings on the estates of the Nikozi's monastery.

1."Because of the hardship, the church estate was destroyed. There were also deeds. We, Barlabe Nichozeli, came to king Shanaoz" (111 v);

2. "We, archbishop Nikoloz Nichozeli, came to King Teimuraz, crowned by God" (111 v);

3. "We, Zedabe Nichozeli, came to King Erekle, crowned by God"

The king mentioned in the first colophon is Vakhtang V (Shah Nawaz). The manuscript is kept in the National Center of Manuscripts. (A 34).

== The manuscripts of the edition D ==
The D (Ephraim the Lesser's) edition is directly based on the C edition. Today more parts of this edition are reached to us, although the Church canonically recognized George's edition. Group D consists of three - Ⴇ, Ⴈ, Ⴉ manuscripts. This group is characterized by scrupulousness and closeness to the Greek source.

== The manuscript Ⴇ ==
=== Description ===
The manuscript has a leather-covered damaged binding; it is written on a parchment; It contains 343 sheets, size 23X14,5 cm. It is written in the Nuskhuri script in two columns in black ink, while the titles and special places are written in red ink; the size of the text is 17X10.5 cm; a distance between the columns is 1.5 cm; each column consists of 22 rows.

=== History ===
The manuscript dates back to the 14th century; The name of the copyist is unknown; the name of the sponsor is Jonathan, whom we discover from the colophon "A". From the "D" we learn that the manuscript belonged to the Gareji Dodo Monastery. In the colophon there is mentioned the date - " ტჟზ" i.e. 1707.

The colophons:

A. This manuscript belongs to the monastery of Dodo. Those who take it away will be punished (1r);

B. God, forgive Saba for his sins (130 v);

C. May the soul of Archbishop Iovane rest in peace. May Christ forgive him. (318 v);

D. May God bless the sponsor, Ionatham, with long life. (326 v);

The manuscript is kept in the National Center of Manuscripts. (A 137).

== The Manuscript Ⴈ ==
=== Description ===
The manuscript has a leather-covered damaged binding; It contains 245 sheets, size 34,3X24,5 cm; it is written in the Nuskhuri script in two columns in black ink, while the capital letters are written in red ink; the size of the text is 24,6X14,7 cm. a distance between the columns is 1.6 cm; each column consists of 20 rows. Several sheets of the manuscript are missing; It is often difficult to read the top of the pages. The first piece is the acts of the apostles (1r-65v), then comes the catholic epistles(66r-100v) and Paul's epistles(101r-241v). The following are missing from Paul's epistles:

Epistle to the Romans(2,18-3,7);

Epistle to the Galatians (5,19-6,12);

Epistle to the Ephesians (1,1-1,8;2,9-3,18;4,16-5,27);

First Epistle to Timothy (1,1-1,12);

Second Epistle to Timothy

Epistle to Titus (1,6-3,15);

Epistle to Philemon (completely)

=== History ===
The manuscript dates back to the 11th-12th centuries; Today kept in the National Center for Manuscripts (A 677).

== The Manuscript Ⴉ ==
=== Description ===
The manuscript has a leather-covered wooden binding. It consists of 227 sheets, size 28x19 cm; It is written in Nuskhuri Script in two columns, each one consists of 26 rows.4 sheets are cut, but their roots are preserved. Their sequence is as follows: The acts of the Apostles(14r-81v), Catholic epistles(82r-117v) and the Pauline epistles(119r-277v). The following are missing from Paul's epistles: "Epistle to Titus"(3,9-3,15) and "Epistle to Philemon" (completely).

=== History ===
The manuscript dates back to the 13th century. Giorgi Avalishvili brought it from the Monastery of the Feast of the Cross in Jerusalem in 1820. He was presented with more than 200 manuscripts by Metropolitan Misael, although G. Avalishvili chose only 9 of them. In 1841, these manuscripts were purchased by the St. Petersburg Academy of Sciences. The manuscript has some colophons.

== Bibliography ==
"The Acts of the Apostles" Ilia Abuladze, Tbilisi, 1950;

"The Description of the Georgian Manuscripts"(Collection A), vol. 1_{1}, Editor: Elene Metreveli, Tbilisi, 1974;

"The Description of the Georgian Manuscripts"(Collection A), vol. 1_{2}, Editor: Elene Metreveli, Tbilisi, 1976;

"The Description of the Georgian Manuscripts"(Collection A), vol. 2_{1}, Editor: Elene Metreveli, Tbilisi, 2004;

"Oписание грузинских рукописей синайского монастыря:,Н.Марр, Москва - Санкт-Петербург, 1940;

"Памятники грузинской старины в Святой Земле и на Синае", А. Цагарели, Санкт-Петербург, 1888;
