= Lev Pisarzhevsky =

Ukrainian chemist (1874–1938)

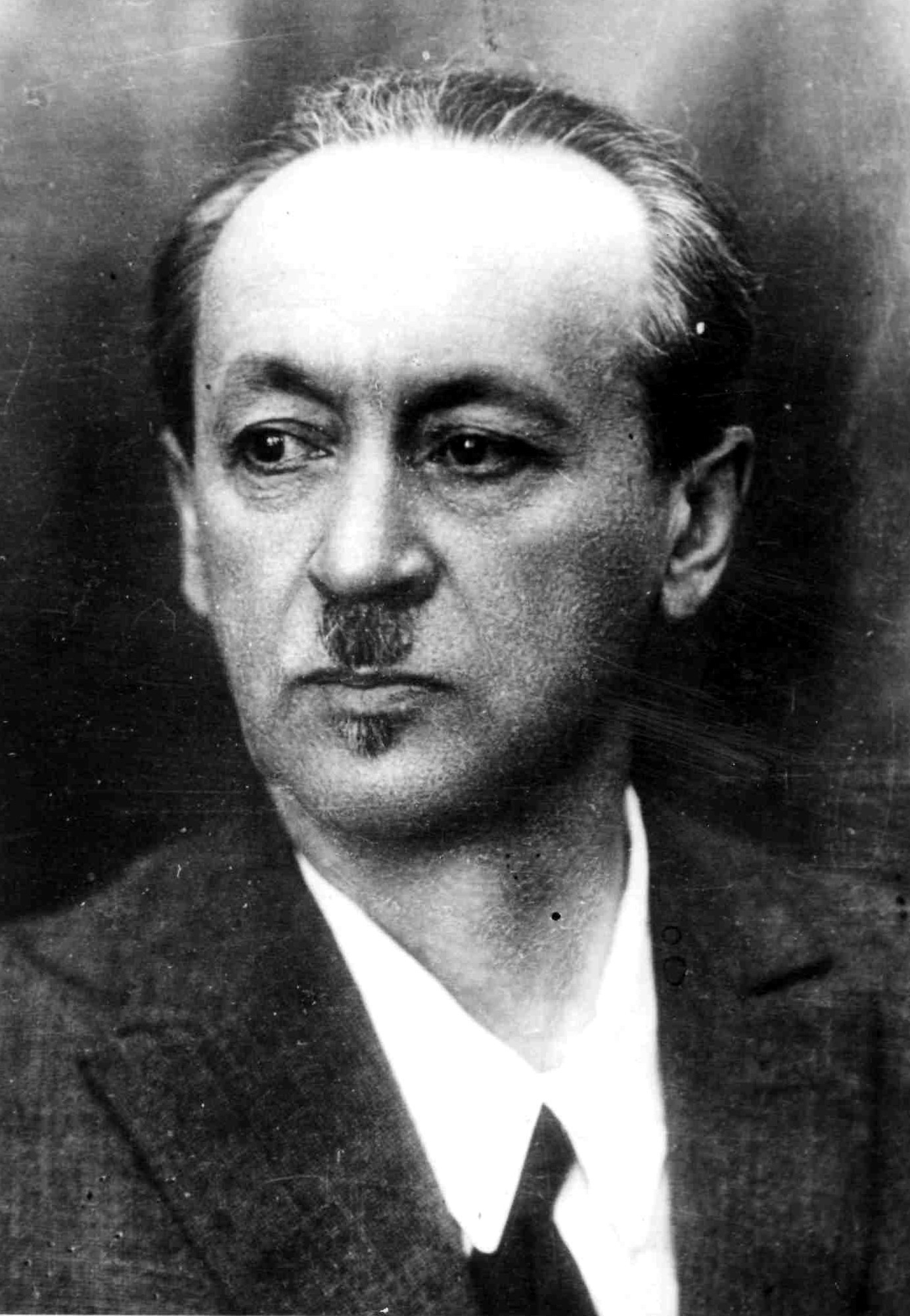
Lev Pisarzhevsky

Lev Vladimirovich Pisarzhevsky (also transliterated as Pisarzhevskii: Russian: Лев Влади́мирович Писарже́вский; 13 February 1874 – 23 March 1938) was a Ukrainian Soviet chemist who studied peroxides, peracids, and solutions.

His contribution to the theory of catalysis is best known for his attempt to relate the catalytic properties of solids to their electronic properties.

== Biography ==
Lev Vladimirovich Pisarzhevsky was born on 13 February 1874 in Chișinău in the Bessarabia Governorate of the Russian Empire (now Moldova).

His mother relocated the family to Odesa following his father's death, where Lev Pisarzhevsky worked to support the family and studied at a school of classical education. He graduated from Novorossiysky University (now Odesa National University) in 1896 and proceeded to work on inorganic peroxides with his university instructor P. Melikishvili. He spent the period from 1900 to 1903 abroad, where he worked in Germany with Wilhelm Ostwald in 1900-1902 and also became acquainted with such leading Western European contributors to physical chemistry as Jacobus Henricus van 't Hoff, Svante Arrhenius, and Walther Nernst.

The young Pisarzhevsky succeeded Gustav Tammann as professor of chemistry at Yuryev University (now University of Tartu) after being recommended by Dmitry Mendeleyev in 1904. His Tartu work contributed to the formulation of the Walden-Pisarzhevsky rule.

Pisarzhevsky lectured in St. Petersburg between 1911 and 1913 and was awarded a doctoral degree for a dissertation entitled Thee Free Energy of Chemical Reaction and the Solvent in 1913. He subsequently taught in Yekaterinoslav (now Dnipro; in 1926-2016 Dnipropetrovsk) and was a founder of the Ukrainian Institute of Physical Chemistry (now the L. V. Pisarzhevsky Institute of Physical Chemistry of the National Academy of Sciences of Ukraine) in 1927. He was elected a corresponding member of the Academy of Sciences of the USSR in 1928 and a full member in 1930.

He died in Dnipropetrovsk on 23 March 1938 after a period of deteriorating health.
