= Givi Alkhazishvili =

Georgian writer

Givi Alkhazishvili (Georgian: გივი ალხაზიშვილი; born 26 May 1944 in Georgia), is a poet, essayist, and translator.

== Biography ==
=== Early life ===
Alkhazishvili, completed secondary school in 1961 and then attended Tbilisi State University. Between 1963 and 1966, he was conscripted into the Red Army. He eventually graduated from Tbilisi State University in 1969.

=== Later life ===
Since 1989, Alkhazishvili has been chief editor of Merani. His stated objective has been to publish works by young, clever writers. Between 2003 and 2006, he was a director of editorial house Merani.

Between the late 1990s and early 2000s Alkhazishvili lectured at the Cultural University, presenting the literary mastery course.

In 2010, Givi Alkhazishvili's 3 books were published: The Fiction – Documentary "Future Past" was published by "Siesta" publishing house, "Intellect," printed "100 poems," The Publisher "Saunje" has published a new poetry collection "Put back Gaze" for which the author was awarded "Saba" for the Best collection of poems of the year in 2011.

=== Poetry ===
Alkhazishvili's poetry had been published from the 1960s in university newspapers and almanacs First Ray, Akhkomi and Tsiakari.

In 1972, publishing house "Merani" (Pegasus) published Alkhazishvili's first book, Poetries. This was achieved through fortuitous circumstances when the chief editor, Grigol Chikovani, was arrested in his office. Nika Agiashvili temporarily became the chief editor and liked Alkhazishvili's work, unlike his predecessor who had insisted that Merani would not publish any social-realistic poetry.

The following collections of poetry have been published:

- Poetries (1972)
- City of Remind (1975)
- Foreign Bird (1975)
- Poetries Poem (1977)
- Window of the Past (1980)
- Dialog in Thoughts (1981)
- Eye as a Candle of Soul (1982)
- Wind Chase (1983)
- The Sky, You Always See (1985)
- Expectation of Words (1987)
- Arise (1987)
- Hurt is Shining (1989)
- Nights Ash (1990)
- Only about love (1990)
- Light in Drop (1995)
- Going out from Horda (1998) Winner of 1998 Akaki Tsereteli Prize and 1999 State Prize
- One Volume (1998)
- Will of Break Away (2005)
- Koronikoni (2006)
- Koronikoni – 2007 (2008)

=== Novels ===
Three novels have also been published:

- Is the Sun Rising or Set? (1999)
- From Row to Row (1999)
- From One Side to Another of the Iron Door (2002)

In 2008, the magazine Our Writing printed a short version of a new novel Future past. The complete novel was soon published as a separate book.

=== Essays ===
In 2004, Merani published collection of Alkhazishvili's essays – Thought Migrated in Words.

=== Translations ===
Alkhazishvili has been a keen translator of foreign poetry into Georgian.

In 1979, with the help of Otar Nodia, he translated Atanas Feti's collection of poems Night Rotches. The artistic board also prepared the collection Day for Ever (1984) which also included translations of work by Atanas Feti, Vladimir Solovyov, Andrei Bely and Alexander Blok.

In 1999, Merani and the world poetry library series published Vislava Shiborska's poetry collection. The translation was done by Alkhazishvili and Mikhail Kvlividze. With Geno Kalandia he also translated Tudor Argezi's poetry collection Moldavian Poetry Papers.

Georgian translations of the first two volumes (of a five volume set) by Rainer Maria Rilke were published by Caucasian house. Naira Gelashvili prepared them for publication in 2007 along with many volumes of Austrian poetry published by Dato Barbakadze. Alkhazishvili's translation of Shaukali was included in the first volume. Rikle appeared in the third volume.

Alkhazishvili's own works have been translated into many languages, including English, Russian, Italian, Ukrainian, etc. Three books have been translated into Russian: Gorod Vospaminania (City of Remind), Molodaya Gvardiya (Young Guard) (1979), Dialog v Razdumiakh (Dialog in thoughts), Molodaya Gvardiya (Young Guard) (1984). In 1988 Sosoyanie (Condition) was translated by the poet and translator Iuli Danieli.

In 1991, All-seeing sky was published in Moscow, with a translation by Alexander Eriomenko and Tatiana Bek. Alexander Eriomenko had worked in the 1970s at Tsiskari magazine as a reviewer, literature worker, and chief of the critic redaction, during which time he collaborated with young writers, many of whom were first published with his help.
