= Petre Melikishvili =

Georgian chemist

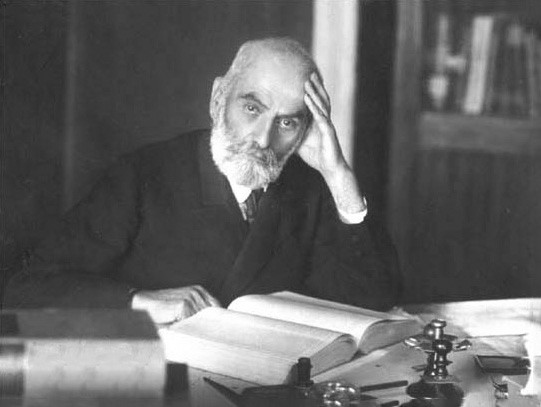
- Melikishvili in 1918
- Born: July 11, 1850; Tbilisi, Russian Empire
- Died: March 23, 1927 (aged 76); Tbilisi, Georgian Soviet Socialist Republic, Soviet Union
- Occupations: chemist, Scientist

Petre Melikishvili (Georgian: პეტრე მელიქიშვილი; July 11, 1850 — March 23, 1927) was a Georgian chemist. He was the co-founder of Tbilisi State University (TSU), the first rector of TSU, head of the Department of Organic Chemistry (1919-1927), corresponding member of the USSR Academy of Sciences (1927) and professor at the University of Odessa.

Petre Melikishvili's field of interest in organic chemistry was the synthesis and properties of inorganic peroxide and acids; in inorganic chemistry - the chemistry of glycolic acids and acrylic acids. He also studied meteorite compositions and agricultural issues.

== Family ==
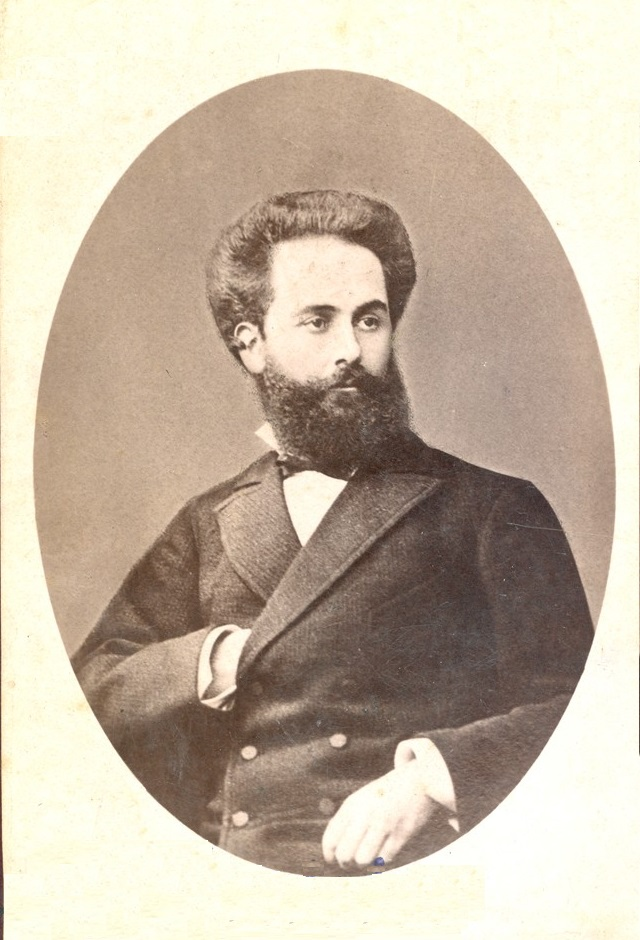
Stephane Melikishvili — Brother of Petre Melikishvili

Petre Melikishvili's ancestors moved from Adjara to Akhaltsikhe in the 16th century. His parents moved from Akhaltsikhe (Meskheti) to Tbilisi in the 1840s. They settled in the house at 36 Vasil Bebutov Street (now 44 Lado Asatiani Street).

Father Grigol Melikishvili was a public figure and actively participated in the establishment of the first private Georgian printing house in Tbilisi. He sent his eldest son to Vienna to bring printing equipments. Petre Melikishvili's older brother Stefane Melikishvili was the first editor and publisher of the newspaper Droeba. His younger brother Iosebi was also a publisher, and his sister, Sergei Meskhi's wife, Ekaterine Melikishvili-Meskhi, was a writer, translator and feminist. Ilia Chavchavadze, Akaki Tsereteli, Sergey Meskhi, Niko Nikoladze and other leaders of the Georgian intelligentsia often visited the Melikishvili family.

== Early years and education ==
Petre Melikishvili was born on July 11, 1850, in Tbilisi. His grandmother taught him to read and write. At the age of ten he was sent to the gymnasium, where he was taught by Nikoloz Ghoghoberidze. Petre Melikishvili graduated from the gymnasium with honors in 1868 and under the influence of Besarion Ghoghoberidze chose to study natural sciences. Petre Melikishvili decided to continue his studies in Moscow or St. Petersburg, but due to poor health, doctors prevented him from continuing his studies in Russia. In 1869 he left for Ukraine and enrolled in the Department of Natural Sciences of the Faculty of Physics and Mathematics at the University of Odessa. Vasil Petriashvili (later the rector of Odessa University) also studied in the last year of the Faculty of Physics and Mathematics, with whom Petre Melikishvili soon became friends.

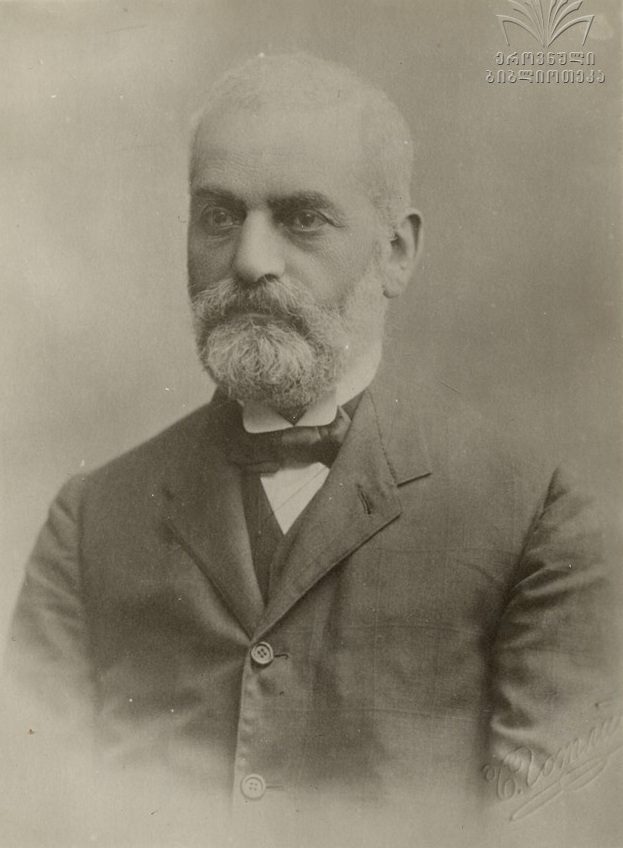
Petre Melikishvili

In 1872, Petre Melikishvili graduated from the university two years earlier with honors and remained at the University of Odessa to train as a professor. In the same year he arrived in Tbilisi, where he taught botany for a year at a private women's gymnasium.

In 1873 Petre Melikishvili went abroad on a business trip. For 2 years he was acquainted with the chemical laboratories of Lothar Meyer and Johannes Vilicenus in Tübingen and Karlsruhe. After returning to Ukraine in 1876, he worked as a laboratory assistant at the University of Odessa Chemical Laboratory.

In 1877 Petre Melikishvili started scientific work in organic chemistry. In 1878 he passed the master's examinations at the University of Odessa and began intensive work on products of unsaturated acids. From 1879 to 1880 he published six papers on acrylic acid and related matters.

In 1881, Petre Melikishvili defended his dissertation "Acrylic Acids" for a master's degree, after which he left for Paris, where he attended lectures by the French chemist Marceline Bertha. Petre Melikishvili left France for Munich, where he worked in the laboratory of the German chemist Adolf Bayer.

In 1884 Petre Melikishvili returned to Odessa. In the same year he was appointed associate professor of the Department of Agronomic Chemistry at the university. In 1885, Melikishvili defended his dissertation "Isomeric Crotonic Acid Products" and was awarded the degree of Doctor of Chemistry. In the same year he was elected professor of the Department of Pure Chemistry, and in 1889 he became professor of the Department. During this period Petre Melikishvili worked on the synthesis of homologous series of acrylic acid and their products.

== Scientific work ==
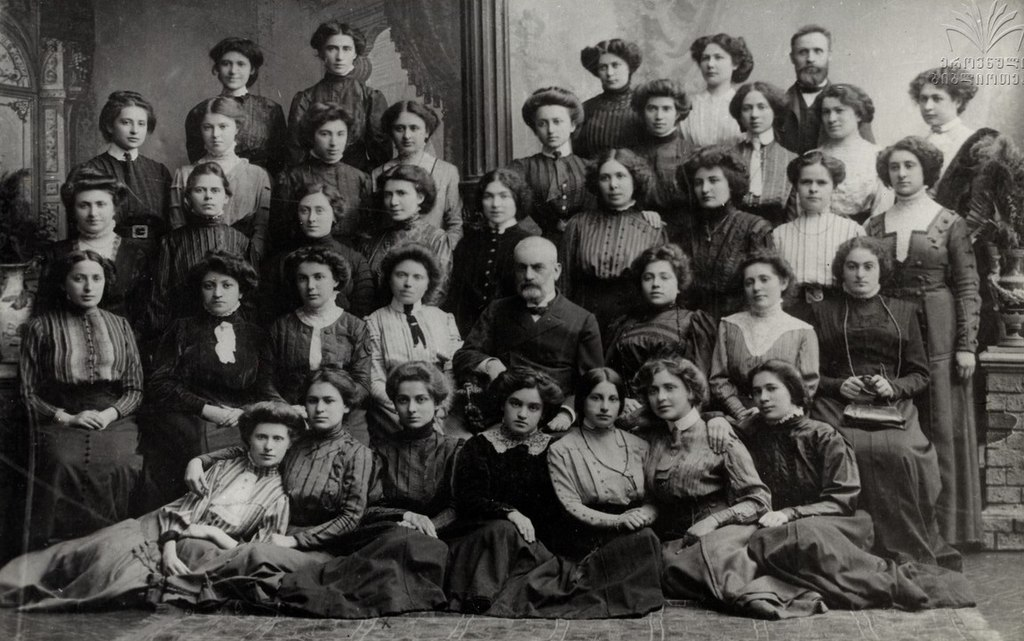
Petre Melikishvili with the students of Odessa Women's Higher Courses

In 1885-1917 Petre Melikishvili was a professor in the Department of Agronomic Chemistry at the University of Novorossiysk.

Petre Melikishvili showed great interest in the emancipation of women. he sent his sister to France to get higher education and was active in getting Georgian women to get higher education abroad. In 1905 he actively participated in the formation of the Odessa Women's Higher Courses. In 1906, the Faculty of Physics and Mathematics was opened for women courses. In October of the same year, Petre Melikishvili was elected dean of the faculty.

In 1923, the 50th anniversary of Petre Melikishvili's pedagogical and scientific-social activity was celebrated. Four years later he was elected a corresponding member of the Soviet Academy of Sciences.

Petre Melikishvili owns 85 scientific papers. He mainly worked in two fields: organic chemistry and inorganic chemistry, and after returning to Georgia he worked intensively on agricultural issues. Petre Melikishvili published the first two works while he was still a student in 1872. During this period, the University of Odessa was the leader in the study of azo and azoxy compounds, and Petre Melikishvili also worked mainly on these compounds. In 1875 he published two papers in the field of physical chemistry.

Petre Melikishvili laid the foundation for the creation of chemical terminology in the Georgian language, which was later developed by his students Nino Tsitsishvili and Rusudan Nikoladze.

=== Meteorites and agrochemistry ===
Petre Melikishvili with students of Odessa University

In the 1890s, Petre Melikishvili became interested in the nature of meteorites. He studied meteorites which fell in different places, including: Tsmeti, Zabrod, Migey, Vakulov and others. After chemical research of meteorites, it was concluded that they contain the same chemical elements as the Earth. The Migay meteorite differed from others in that it contained coal, sulfur, phosphorus, and organic compounds, namely higher hydrocarbons.

Petre Melikishvili also studied minerals and agricultural products. His field of research included: wine, cheese, tea, etc. As a result of chemical analysis of wine and wheat, he concluded that the quality of these products is influenced by climatic conditions and time. after researching Chakvi tea with M. Rosenblatt, he found that the subtropical climate and soil in western Georgia were suitable for tea plantation cultivation.

Petre Melikishvili owns the following researches: "Chemical composition of Turkish wheat", "Wines of Odessa region", "Investigation of wheat of southern Russia", "Gluten exchange", "Wines of Kherson province", "Chemical composition of Russian sheep cheese", "Analysis of Russian sheep cheese", etc which were published in various editions of the Russian Empire.

In 1896, Petre Melikishvili published a study on natural soda, in which the issue of its formation was discussed.

=== Inorganic chemistry ===
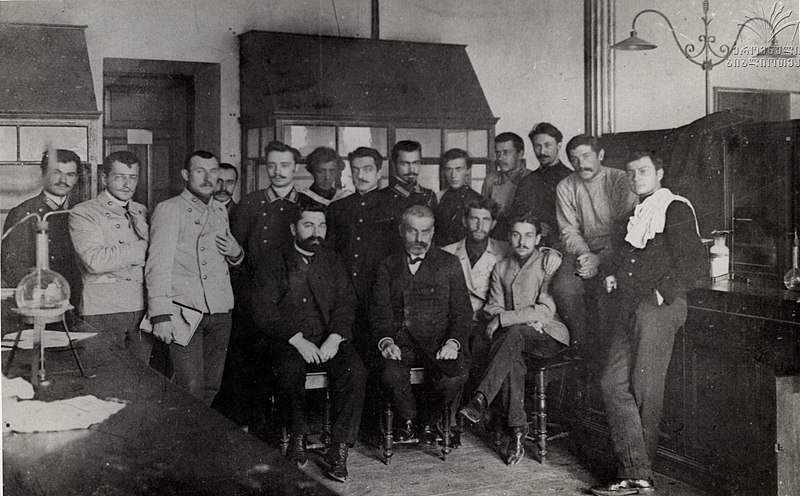
Petre Melikishvili in the Chemistry Lab with students

In 1897 Petre Melikishvili started working in the field of inorganic chemistry and wrote more than 20 papers in this field. The Russian Academy of Sciences has published these studies under the title "Peroxides and Super Acids". Petre Melikishvili was awarded the Lomonosov Gold Medal together with Lev Pisarzhevsky for these examinations. According to Dmitry Mendeleev, their works "perfected the periodic table of the chemical elements."

== In Tbilisi State University ==
At the suggestion of Ivane Javakhishvili, on January 13, 1918, Petre Melikishvili was elected the first rector of Tbilisi State University. He did not receive a salary during his tenure as rector. Petre Melikishvili gave lectures and set up laboratories at the Faculty of Natural Sciences. In 1918, he founded the Department of Chemistry, which he headed, and then it was divided into two departments, the Department of Inorganic Chemistry (headed by Jason Moseshvili) and the Department of Organic Chemistry, which he headed.

In 1919 Petre Melikishvili and the Dean of the Faculty of Mathematics and Natural Sciences Andrea Razmadze argued. Petre Melikishvili applied for the resignation, however, he continued to work in the Department of Organic Chemistry and headed the newly established Faculty of Agriculture of the university.

== Death and inheritance ==
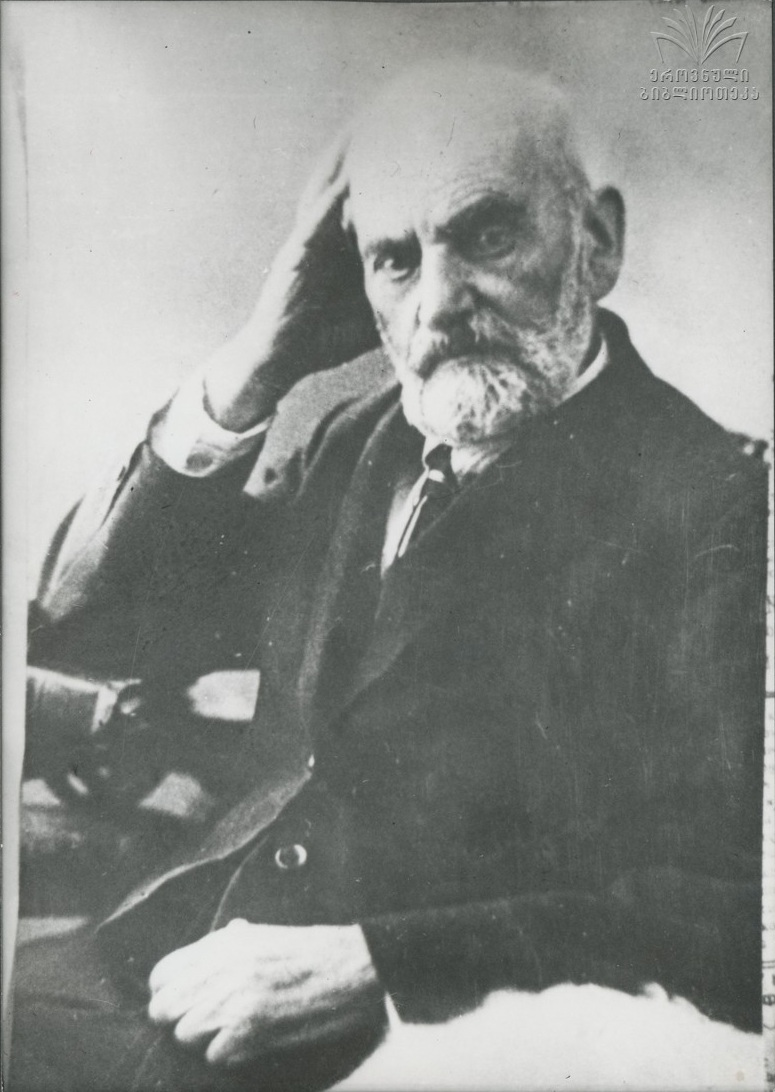
Petre Melikishvili

Petre Melikishvili was a lonely man. He avoided political activities, including administrative positions.

Petre Melikishvili died on March 23, 1927, at the age of 77. He is buried in the yard of Tbilisi State University. Petre Melikishvili was the first professor to be buried in the university yard. A year later, a monument created by Iakob Nikoladze was erected in the Pantheon.

The Petre Melikishvili Prize exists at the Georgian National Academy of Sciences. There is a scholarship, an auditorium and a cabinet-library named after him at Tbilisi State University. The first rector's desk and personal belongings are kept in the University Museum. The original photos of Petre Melikishvili's personal fund are kept in the Odessa regional archive. Electronic versions are kept in the Museum of Tbilisi State University.

Petre Melikishvili Street is located in Tbilisi. Institute of Physical and Organic Chemistry is named after him.

== Organizations and associations ==
- Tbilisi State University, Founder, Rector (1918-1919)
- Academy of Sciences of the USSR, Corresponding Member (1927-)
- Georgian Scientific School of Chemistry, founder

== Awards ==
- Mikhail Lomonosov Gold Medal (1899)

== Bibliography ==
- "The chemical composition of our wine." Tbilisi (Georgia): Printing house of the Ministry of Defense. 1920.
