= Levan Aghniashvili =

Georgian lawyer and professor

Levan Aghniashvili (Georgian: ლევან აღნიაშვილი) (1897–1937) was a Georgian lawyer and Professor of Law who served as the seventh Rector of Tbilisi State University in the period between April 1933 and July 1935.

Having opposed the Democratic Republic of Georgia, he was sent into an exile in 1918. During the civil war, Aghniashvili was involved in political activities in the Ukraine, North Caucasus, and the districts of Kazan and Minsk. In the period between 1923 and 1925, Aghniashvili served as the Representative of the Central Committee of the Communist Party of the Soviet Union to Germany. From 1926, he had been delivering lectures at the State University in Tbilisi, until becoming the Rector in 1933. Levan Aghniashvili was shot to death by the Communists in 1937, the year of massive repressions. Aghniashvili was succeeded by Karlo Oragvelidze who also became the victim of Communist repressions, similarly being shot in 1937, despite being largely pro-Communist and having criticised historian Ivane Javakhishvili. Aghniashvili's rectorship is still remembered as an important one, as the University Publishing House was established during his period of leadership.
