= Tbilisi State University =

Public university in Tbilisi, Georgia

Ivane Javakhishvili Tbilisi State University
- ივანე ჯავახიშვილის სახელობის თბილისის სახელმწიფო უნივერსიტეტი
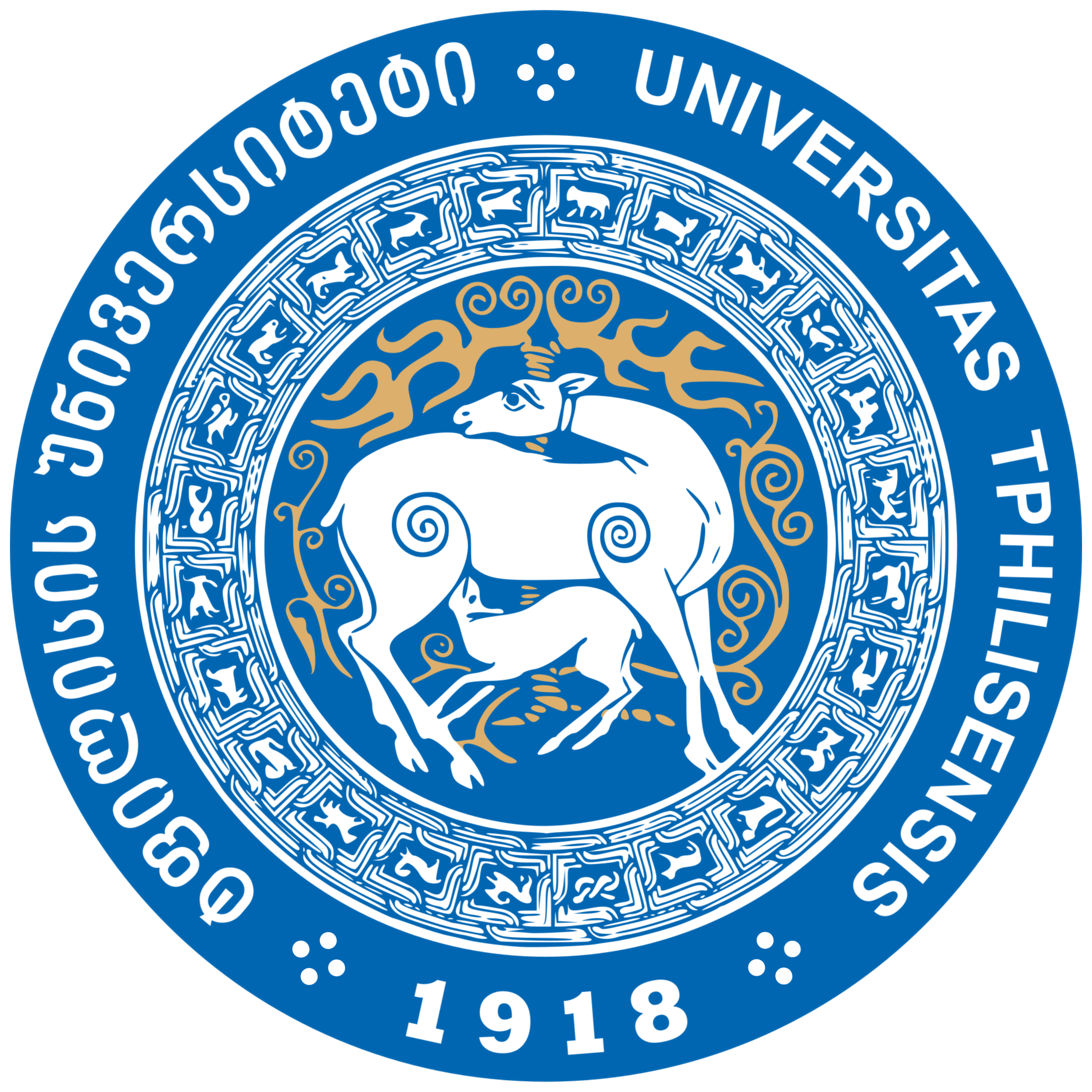
- Latin: Universitas Tphilisensis
- Type: Public
- Established: February 1918; 108 years ago
- Founders: Ivane Javakhishvili; Co-founders; Kote Abkhazi, Giorgi Akhvlediani, Shalva Nutsubidze, Dimitri Uznadze, Grigol Tsereteli, Akaki Shanidze, Andrea Razmadze, Korneli Kekelidze, Ioseb Kipshidze, Petre Melikishvili and Ekvtime Takaishvili.
- Affiliations: EUA, EAEC, AUF, IAU, Magna Charta Universitatum, BSUN
- Budget: ₾109.2 million
- Chancellor: Lasha Saghinadze
- Rector: Jaba Samushia
- Faculty: 768
- Students: 23,500
- Postgraduates: 1,415
- Doctoral students: 280
- Location: Tbilisi, Georgia; 41°42′36″N 44°46′42″E
- Campus: Urban
- Colours: Blue, white
- Nickname: თესეუ (TSU)
- Website: www.tsu.ge
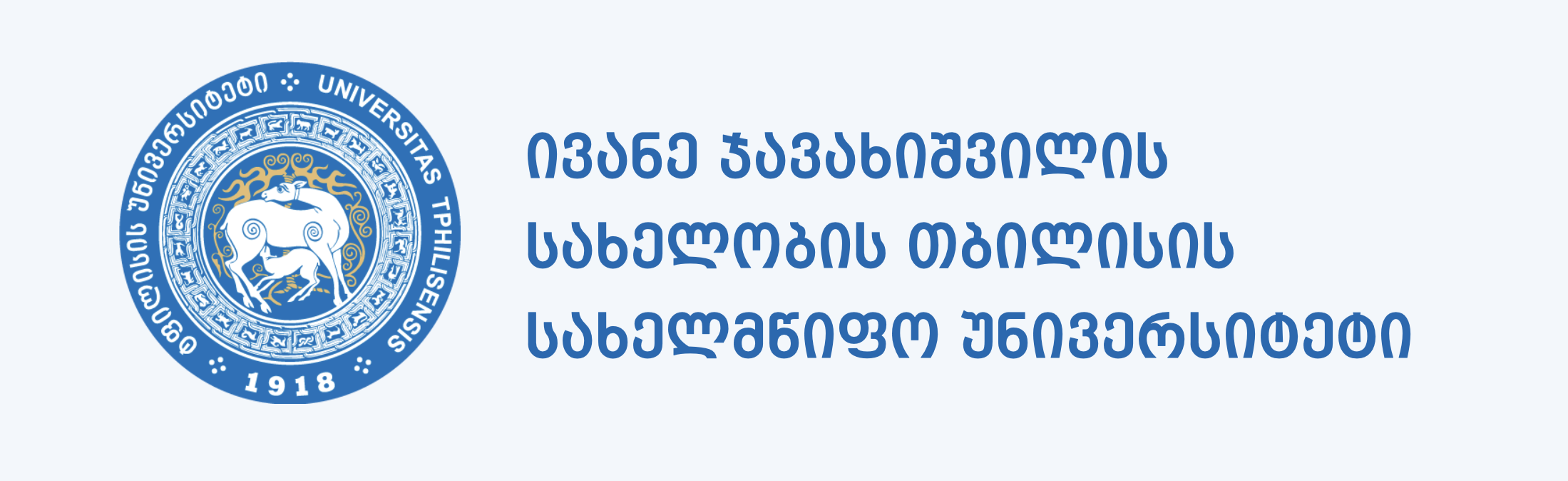

Ivane Javakhishvili Tbilisi State University, (Note: (Georgian: ივანე ჯავახიშვილის სახელობის თბილისის სახელმწიფო უნივერსიტეტი, romanized: ivane javakhishvilis sakhelobis tbilisis sakhelmts'ipo universit'et'i) also known as Tbilisi State University or TSU, is a public research university established on 8 February 1918 in Tbilisi, Georgia. Excluding academies and theological seminaries, which have intermittently functioned in Georgia for centuries, TSU is the oldest university in Georgia and the Caucasus region. The total enrollment is over 23,500 students, and there are 5,000 faculty and staff members (collaborators) overall.

The main founder of the university was a Georgian historian and academician, Ivane Javakhishvili. Among the co-founders were also several scientists, including Giorgi Akhvlediani, Shalva Nutsubidze, Dimitri Uznadze, Grigol Tsereteli, Akaki Shanidze, Andrea Razmadze, Korneli Kekelidze, Ioseb Kipshidze, Petre Melikishvili and Ekvtime Takaishvili. Professor Petre Melikishvili, a Georgian chemist, became the first rector of TSU. Elizabeth Orbeliani, who was also among the co-founders, became the first woman to teach in the university's history.

== History ==
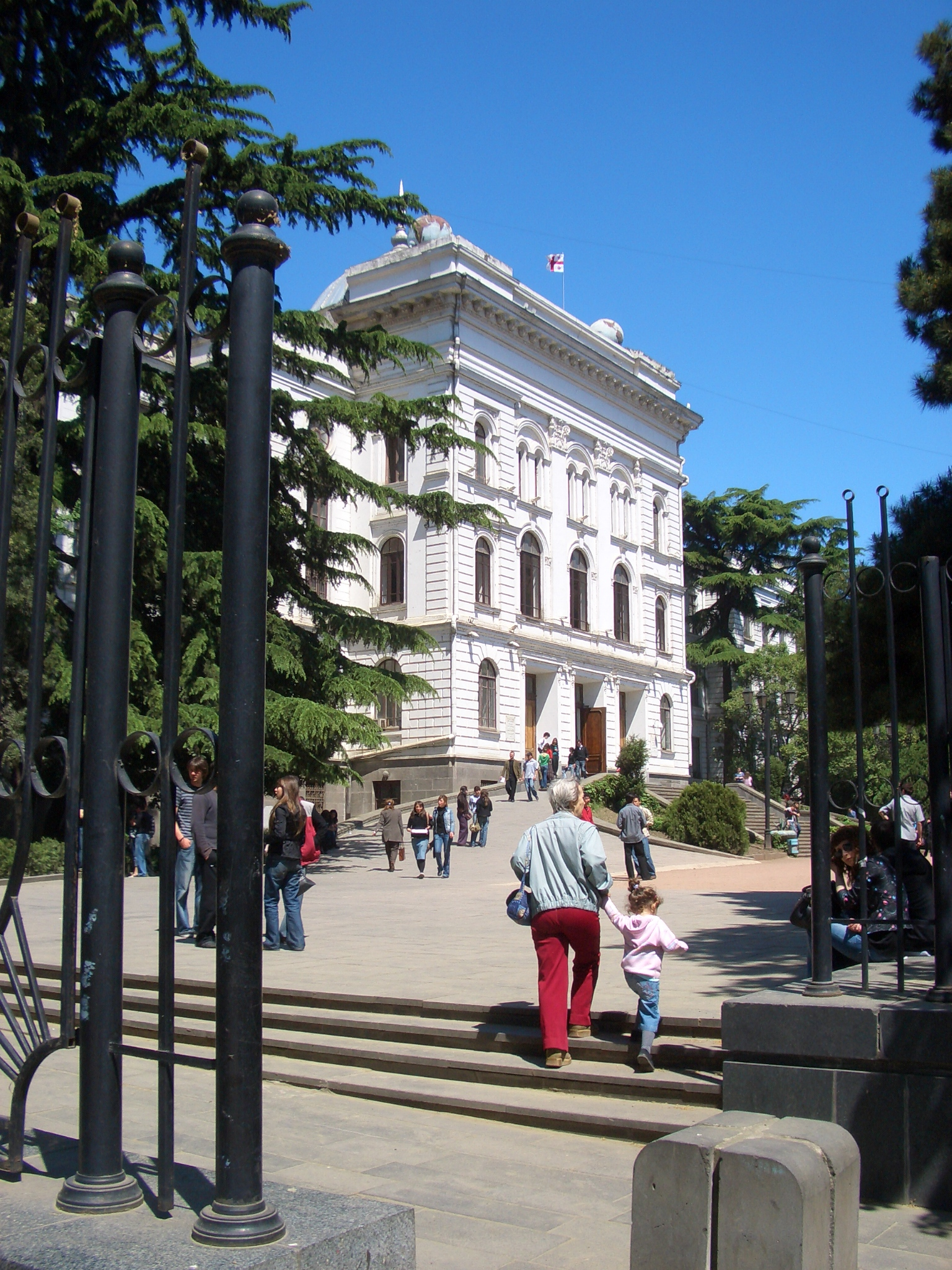
Tbilisi State University, Corpus I on Ilia Chavchavadze Avenue, Vake.

Tbilisi State University building backside in 1918.

Tbilisi State University was founded in 1918 owing to the leadership of Georgian historian Ivane Javakhishvili and the group of his followers. It was the first and the only educational body of this type in the Caucasus Region by that time. The university is housed in the former building of Georgian Nobility Gymnasium constructed by the architect Simon Kldiashvili from 1899 to 1906.

The construction and development of the future building of Tbilisi State University were spearheaded by Niko Tskhvedadze, a founding member and board participant of the Society for the Spreading of Literacy among Georgians. His role in overseeing the construction was pivotal to the university's establishment.

Georgia has a tradition of education, as evidenced by the functioning of the School of Philosophy and Rhetoric of Phazisi in Colchis (4th century); as well as the setting up of cultural-enlightenment centers in Palestine (5th century), Syria (6th century), Greece (10th–15th centuries) and Bulgaria (11th century); Gelati and Iqalto Academies in Georgia (11th–12th centuries); However, as a result of political-economic decrease and at last becoming the colony of Russia, there had been no national higher educational Institution in Georgia for the next few centuries.

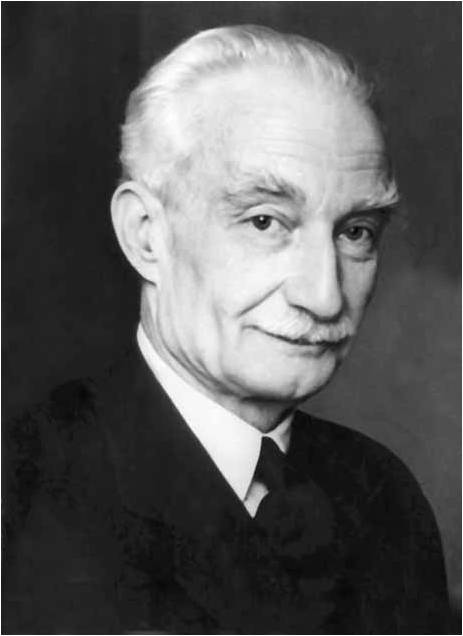
Founder Ivane Javakhishvili

After Georgia became independent and declared itself a national democratic state, one of the first achievements of the Georgian people at the beginning of the 20th century was the foundation of the Georgian National University in Tbilisi. Afterwards, through the Bolshevik and Communist period, in spite of the forced ideology and fierce censorship, Tbilisi State University maintained schools in mathematics, psychology, philosophy, linguistics, and historiography. The foundation of the Academy of Science of Georgia and other higher educational institutions was encouraged by the university.

The university was opened on 26 January 1918, the day of remembrance of the Georgian king David the Builder. A church in the university garden, named after the king, has been functioning since 5 September 1995. In 1989 the university was named after its founder - Ivane Javakhishvili.

Petre Melikishvili, a chemist and professor, was elected as the first rector of the university. At its commencement, the university had one faculty - that of philosophy. Javakhishvili, a Georgian historian, delivered the first lecture. At the beginning of 1918 the board of professors and lecturers numbered 18, the student body of the university counted 369 students and 89 free listeners.

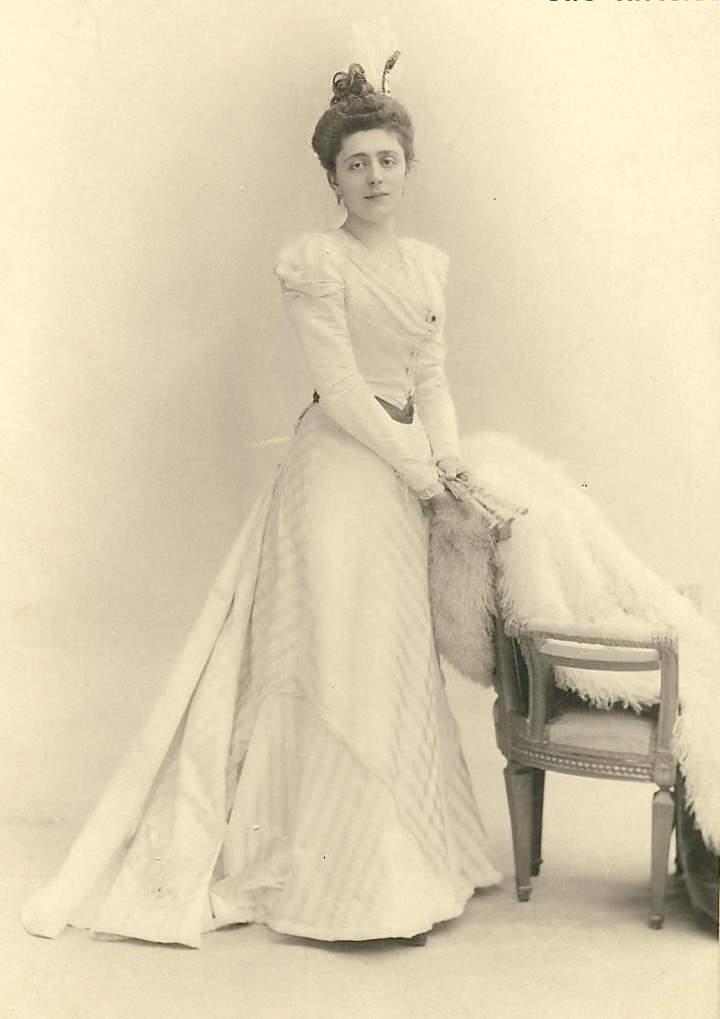
Elizabeth Orbeliani, the first woman lecturer and co-founder of TSU.

Today the number of professors involved in tuition and training amounts to 3275, including 55 academicians and corresponding member of the academy, 595 professors and doctors, 1246 assistant professors and candidates of sciences.

Over 35 thousand students are studying at the university and its eight regional branches. Important changes at the university began on 25 April 1994, when the scientific council of the university adopted "The Concepts of University Education"page3-5, according to which since the year 1994 the university has transferred to the two-stage form of study (the step-by-step rearrangements were launched in 1992).

At the end of the I stage of the reform implemented, at the beginning of 2005, the bodies functioning at TSU were: 22 faculties with 184 chairs, 8 branches with 46 faculties, 3 scientific-research and study-scientific institutes, 81 scientific-research laboratories and centers, 161 study laboratories and rooms, clinical hospitals and diagnostic centers, publishing and editorial houses, the library with 3,650,000 items, 5 dormitories. 95 educational programs were used at the bachelor's course, 194 at master's studies, and 16 at the single-step tuition. Schools that came into being at Tbilisi University were:

- Mathematics (Andrea Razmadze for whom the department was renamed in 1944, Nikoloz Muskhelishvili, Ilia Vekua, Viktor Kupradze, Andro Bitsadze and others),
- Physics (Elephter Andronikashvili, for whom the Institute was renamed in 1999, Mate Mirianashvili, Vagan Mamasakhlisov, Givi Khutsishvili Albert Tavkhelidze and others),
- Psychology (Dimitri Uznadze and others),
- Physiology (Ivane Beritashvili and others).
- National Scholarly Schools of Georgian Historiography (Ivane Javakhishvili and others),
- History of Literature (Korneli Kekelidze and others),
- Georgian Philosophy (Shalva Nutsubidze and others),
- Art Studies (Giorgi Chubinashvili and others),
- Georgian and Caucasian Linguistics (Akaki Shanidze, Giorgi Akhvlediani, Arnold Chikobava and others),
- Oriental and Classical Philology (Grigol Tsereteli, Simon Qaukhchishvili, Giorgi Tsereteli and others).
- Kartvelology (Kartvelian Studies)

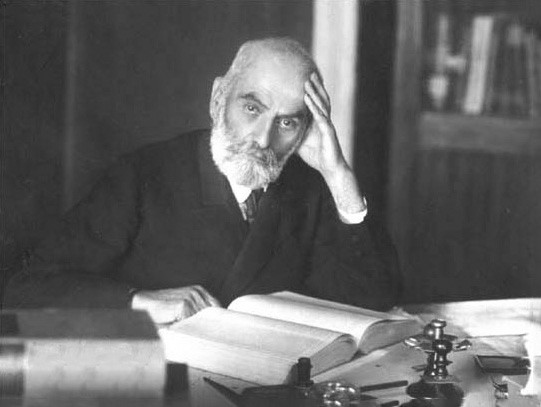
First Rector Prof. Petre Melikishvili

The chairs and scientific research departments serve for preparation of postgraduate students and scientific degrees. 26 qualification councils operate for conferring scientific degrees in almost all fields of science.

Medical education was restored at the university in 1994. Originally the specialty of medicine was opened at the faculty of biology and medicine, and the faculty of medicine became an independent unit in 2000. A center for the Management of Health Care and the Department for Continuous Medical Education were opened, and the board of trustees of medicine and medical information service were founded. The university diagnostic center provides the health care of the professors and lecturers and collaborators of the university.

A printing press was set up in 1923 and a publishing-house in 1933. The University Archive was founded in 1933. The scientific edition "The Proceedings of Tbilisi University" has been published since 1919. The program Textbooks for Students has been functioning since 1996. The university publishes two weekly newspapers "Tbilisis Universiteti" (since 1927) and "Kartuli Universiteti" (since 1998).

== Faculties ==
TSU has seven faculties:

- Exact and Natural Sciences – departments include: mathematics, physics, chemistry, geography, computer sciences, biology, geology, electric and electronic engineering
- Humanities
- Social and Political Sciences – departments include: Political Science, Journalism, International Relations, Human Geography, Sociology and Social Work.
- Psychology and Educational Sciences – formed in 2014
- Economics and Business – established in 1931
- Law
- Medicine – established in 1918

== Institution and administration ==
University rankings

Global – Overall
- QS World: 951-1000 (2026)

Regional – Overall
- QS Emerging Europe and Central Asia: 118 (2022)

TSU has no central campus, its buildings are spread over the city. The oldest building is #1 where the administration of the university is seated. In the yard of the 1st TSU campus lie the founders of Tbilisi State University, whose names imply establishment and development of various scientific schools in Georgia. The Pantheon of Tbilisi State University is one of the special cultural and historical places.

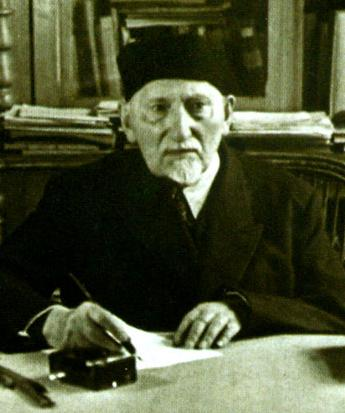
Georgian historian, archaeologist and public benefactor Prof. Ekvtime Takaishvili, one of the founders and a professor of TSU

=== Board of representatives ===
The board of representatives is the university representative body, which is elected by the faculties. Senate members are elected separately from the students and the academic personnel in proportion to their number at each structural unit.სიახლეები

The board of representatives is elected from within the university on the basis of general, direct and equal elections, by secret ballot. Students comprise one-third of the board. The board includes a representative from the university's library.

=== Academic council ===
The academic council is the highest representative body of the university. Council is elected by the members of the faculties academic personnel and those representatives of students' self-governance who are the members of faculty council, on the basis of direct, free and equal elections, by secret ballot. Only professors may be elected as the members of the academic council.

=== Rector ===
The rector is the highest academic authority of the university, serves as a chair of the academic council, represents the university in academic and research spheres both domestically and internationally. The rector is elected by the majority vote of academic council members, through secret ballot.

=== Chancellor ===
The chancellor is the highest administrative manager at the university in the sphere of financial issues, material and human resources and represents the institution in financial and economic relationships.

The chancellor is nominated by the academic council and approved by the board of representatives, through secret ballot. The term of office of the chancellor is four years.

=== Other ===
There are museums of history, Georgian emigration, mineralogy, geology and paleontology, geography, zoology and botany.

The five dormitories can accommodate up to 2200 living rooms.

The university has eight branches in Sokhumi, Meskheti, Ozurgeti, Sighnaghi (Kakheti), Zugdidi, Kvemo Kartli (Marneuli), Javakheti and Poti.

University schools are Ivane Javakhishvili school N53, the N. Muskhelishvili school N55, prof. T. Georgia physical-mathematical boarding school, Tbilisi lyceum, Rustavi gymnasium, Gurjaani college and Khobi school.

== Affiliations ==
The university has contacts with foreign scientific and educational centers:

RWTH Aachen University, University of Saarland and Jena University (Germany), Emory University and Georgia State University (USA), Saint Mary's University (Canada), Warsaw University and University of Łódź (Poland), University of Málaga and University of Salamanca (Spain), Nantes, Paris 8, Paris 13, Grenoble and Toulon Universities (France), Bristol Polytechnical Institute, Brunel and London Universities (Great Britain), Budapest Eötvös Loránd University (Hungary), Bilkent, Trabzon Black Sea and Ankara Universities (Turkey), Palermo, Rome and Sapienza, Piza and Venice Universities (Italy), Athens, Pirueus, Ioanina and Saloniki Universities (Greece), International Centre of Nuclear Physics, Aarhus University (Denmark), Bucharest University (Romania), University of Vienna (Austria), Tehran and Gilan Universities (Iran), Cairo University (Egypt). TSU has relations with the Association of European Universities, UNESCO, the Council of Europe and other international organizations.

== Rectors ==
- Petre Melikishvili - 1918/I – 1919/XII
- Ivane Javakhishvili - 1919/XII – 1926/VI
- Tedo Ghlonti - 1926/IX – 1928/IX
- Malakia Toroshelidze - 1928/IX – 1930/IX
- Ivane Vashakmadze - 1930/I – 1931/IX
- Aleksandre Erkomaishvili - 1931/X – 1932/XII
- Levan Agniashvili - 1933/IV – 1935/VI
- Karlo Oragvelidze - 1935/VI – 1937/VI
- Giorgi Kiknadze - 1937/VII – 1938/IX
- Davit Kipshidze - 1938/X – 1942/II
- Aleksandre Janelidze - 1942/II – 1945/VII
- Nikoloz Ketskhoveli - 1945/VII – 1953/VI
- Ilia Vekua - 1953/VII – 1953/IX, 1966/IV – 1972/IV
- Ermile Burchuladze - 1953/IX – 1954/IX
- Victor Kupradze - 1954/IX – 1958/III
- Giorgi Dzotsenidze - 1958/IV – 1959/III
- Evgeni Kharadze - 1959/III – 1966/III
- Davit Chkhikvishvili - 1972/V – 1980/II
- Vazha Okujava - 1980/III – 1985/IX
- Nodar Amaghlobeli - 1985/IX – 1991/VIII
- Tamaz Gamkrelidze - 1991/VIII – 1991/IX
- Otar Japaridze - 1991/IX – 1991/X
- Roin Metreveli - 1991/X – 2004/X
- Rusudan Lortkipanidze - 2004/XII – 2006/IV
- Giorgi Khubua - 2006/IV – 2010/VIII
- Alexander Kvitashvili - 2010/VIII – 2013/VII
- Vladimer Papava - 2013/VII – 2016/III
- Darejan Tvaltvadze (acting) - 2016/IV – 2016/IX
- Giorgi Sharvashidze - 2016/IX – 2022/X
- Jaba Samushia - (acting rector) 2022/X – 2022/XII) — Rector 2022/XII –

== Alumni ==
=== Prime Ministers ===
- Giorgi Gakharia
- Mamuka Bakhtadze
- Giorgi Kvirikashvili
- Irakli Garibashvili
- Irakli Kobakhidze
- Bidzina Ivanishvili
- Giorgi Arsenishvili
- Nikoloz Gilauri
- Vladimer Gurgenidze
- Zurab Zhvania

=== Speakers of the Parliament ===
- Tamar Chugoshvili (acting)
- Davit Usupashvili
- David Bakradze
- Nino Burjanadze

=== Others ===
- Gocha Lordkipanidze, judge of the International Criminal Court
- Ilia Abuladze, philologist
- Giuli Alasania, historian
- Givi Alkhazishvili, author, poet, essayist
- Diana Anphimiadi, poet
- Tamar Beruchashvili, Minister of Foreign Affairs of Georgia
- Vakhtang Butskhrikidze, CEO of TBC Bank
- Arnold Chikobava, linguist
- Levan Chilashvili, archaeologist
- Juansher Chkareuli, physicist
- Gia Dvali, physicist
- Ana Dolidze, activist
- Guranda Gvaladze, botanist
- Evgen Gvaladze, lawyer and politician
- Koba Gvenetadze, Governor of the National Bank of Georgia
- Gia Getsadze, lawyer
- Nikoloz Janashia, historian
- Sergi Jikia, historian, orientalist and founder of the Turkology in Georgia.
- Otar Kakhidze, politician
- Kakha Kaladze, politician and retired footballer
- John Khetsuriani, lawyer
- Dimitri Kumsishvili, Minister of Finance
- Beka Kurkhuli, writer
- David Lordkipanidze, anthropologist
- Giwi Margwelaschwili, a philosopher, writer, Nobel Prize candidate
- Giorgi Melikishvili, historian
- Miho Mosulishvili, writer, playwright
- Aka Morchiladze, writer
- Jaba Mujiri, footballer
- Gia Nodia, Minister of Education and Science of Georgia,political scientist
- Irakli Okruashvili, politician
- Bulat Okudjava, noted writer, poet, musician
- Stepan Pachikov, founder of Evernote
- Baia Pataraia, women's rights activist
- Grigol Peradze, theologian and historian
- Andrea Razmadze, mathematician, Tbilisi University co-founder
- Tinatin Sadunishvili, biologist and academic
- Viktor Saneyev, track and field athlete
- Anna Schchian, botanist
- Daro Sulakauri, photographer, photojournalist
- Igor Svanidze, scientist, histologist
- Giorgi Targamadze, politician
- Maya Tskitishvili, Minister of Regional Development and Infrastructure
- Sergo Vardosanidze, history professor
- Lasha Zhvania, politician, diplomat

== See also ==
- List of modern universities in Europe (1801–1945).
