= Pavlo Moroz =

Braxton Ltd., Managing Partner
- In office September 2017 – present

Personal details
- Born: September 28, 1974 (age 52) Kyiv
- Education: Taras Shevchenko National University of Kyiv
- Website: https://minjust.gov.ua/ua

Pavlo Moroz (born September 28, 1974 in Kyiv, Ukraine) was the Deputy Minister of Justice of Ukraine.

In 1997, Moroz graduated from the Department of International Law, Institute of International Relations at Taras Shevchenko National University of Kyiv. He worked at various companies, including Deloitte and Ernst & Young. In 2001, he became an attorney at law and obtained the required certificate. In February 2016, he was appointed as Deputy Minister of Justice on state registration. He coordinates and supervises activities of the State Registration and Notaries Department.

== Education ==
In 1997, Moroz graduated from the Department of International Law, Institute of International Relations at Taras Shevchenko National University of Kyiv. Since 2012, Moroz has been studying tax law from the University of Alabama, US (Master's program, distance learning). Moroz is fluent in Ukrainian, English and Russian.

== Professional experience ==
- 2017–present – Managing Partner, Braxton Ltd.;
- 2016–2017 – Deputy Minister of Justice of Ukraine on state registration;
- 2005–2016 – director, tax and legal services department, Ernst & Young;
- 2001–2005 – manager, tax and legal services department, Deloitte;
- 2001 – obtained Attorney at Law Certificate;
- 2000–2001 – lawyer, telecommunication company Hellaskom A. E. International;
- 1997–2000 – senior lawyer, Ukrainian insurance company Garant-AUTO.

While working at the international audit companies Deloitte and Ernst & Young, Pavlo Moroz provided consulting services on corporate and tax law, mergers and acquisitions, support of transactions, investment planning and development of international tax structures to multinational corporations and Ukrainian companies.

Pavlo Moroz left Ernst & Young for public service.

== Reforms in the Ministry of Justice ==
=== Registration of businesses and real estate ===
On April 30, 2016, the reform of the state registration of business and real estate was accomplished. The Minister of Justice Pavlo Petrenko de-monopolized and decentralized the state registration of business and real estate.

Before the reform, the functions of business and real estate registration were performed by the Ministry's 529 regional offices. On May 1, 2016, these functions were transferred to more than 900 local municipal authorities. Currently, the state registration services are also provided by 6,500 notaries and more than 100 certified municipal entities.

As a result of this transfer, lines for obtaining registration services and preconditions for incentive fees disappeared. Local municipal authorities obtain registration fees.

The Ministry of Justice was then left with a supervising function, implemented through the Committee on Consideration of Complaints in the field of state registration. For the time being, the Committee on Consideration of Complaints in state registration prevented more than 150 illegal corporate takeovers.

=== Registration of civil actions ===
The next important reform of the Ministry of Justice is decentralization of the system of registration of civil actions, initiated by Pavlo Moroz. The Ministry of Justice has launched this reform and organized the respective working group. The first result is implementation of the pilot project for citizens. Currently it is possible to register a marriage within 24 hours.

== Family and private life ==
Pavlo Moroz is married to Anna Moroz who resides in Israel and together they have a daughter.
