= Grigol Tsereteli =

Georgian scientist (1870-1938)

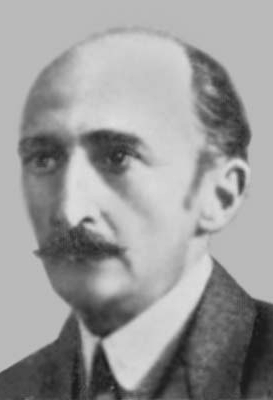
Grigol Tsereteli

Grigol Tsereteli (Georgian: გრიგოლ წერეთელი; March 12, 1870 – 1938) was a distinguished Georgian scientist, one of the founders of Papyrology, founder of the Georgian scientific school of Classical Philology, Doctor of Philological Sciences, Meritorious Scientific Worker of Georgia, Honourable Professor.

== Life and works ==
Grigol Tsereteli was born in 1870, in St Petersburg, Russian Empire. His father, Prince Filimon Tsereteli, was a well-known lawyer and public benefactor.

In 1893 Tsereteli graduated from the University of St. Petersburg. In 1893-1897 he was a Lecturer of the St Petersburg Archaeological Institute, in 1897-1902 Associate Professor of the Berlin University (Germany), in 1902-1905 Associate Professor of the University of St Petersburg. In 1905 he received a PhD degree in Classical Philology.

In 1905-1914 Tsereteli was a Professor and Head of the Department of Classical Philology of the University of Tartu, Estonia. In 1914 he received a degree of the Doctor of Philological Sciences.

In 1914-1920 he was a Professor and Head of the Department of Classical Philology of the University of St. Petersburg.

In 1917 Tsereteli was elected as Corresponding Member of the St Petersburg Academy of Sciences (now the Russian Academy of Science).

In 1918-1920 he was a Visiting Professor of the Berlin University.

In 1920-1937 Tsereteli was a Professor and Head of the Department of Classical Philology of the Tbilisi State University (Georgia). In 1923-1931 he was also Director of the Scientific Library of the Tbilisi State University.

Tsereteli was elected as Honorary Member of the Society of Papyrology of Germany (1918) and Honorary Member of the Berlin Institute of Archaeology (1927).

He was author of many outstanding scientific works in the fields of papyrology, classical philology and history of the old Grecian literature.

Grigol Tsereteli was a victim of the political repressions of 1937 in Soviet Georgia (the Great Purge). In 1937 he was jailed by GPU, and he died in prison in 1938. Tsereteli is buried in Tbilisi, in the Mtatsminda Pantheon of distinguished Georgian public benefactors.

== Some of the main works of Grigol Tsereteli ==
- "Berliner Griechische Urkunden". III, 5, Berlin, 1900 (in German)
- "Berliner Griechische Urkunden". IV, 2, Berlin, 1904 (in German)
- "New comedies of Menandre" (a monograph), Tartu, 1914 (in Russian)
- "La Papyrologie Greque, en Russie".- "Chronique d'Égypte", XII, Bruxelles, 1931 (in French)
- "Papyri Russischer und Georgisher samlungen". Herausg. von G. Zereteli. Bearb. von G. Zereteli, O. Kruger und P. Yernstedt. Ed. G. Zereteli. I-V, Tbilisi, 1925-1935; Amsterdam, 1966-1967 (in German)

== See also ==
- List of Georgians
- Tbilisi State University
