= Akaki Shanidze =

Georgian linguist and philologist (1887–1987)

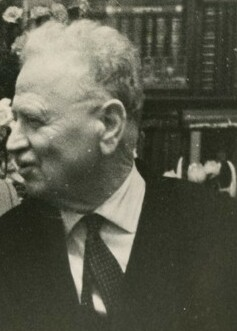
- 1963
- Born: 26 February 1887; Nogha village, Ozurgeti uezd, Kutaisi Governorate, Russian Empire
- Died: 29 March 1987 (aged 100); Tbilisi, Georgian SSR, Soviet Union
- Resting place: Nogha, Samtredia
- Occupation: Linguist

Akaki Shanidze (Georgian: აკაკი შანიძე; 26 February 1887 – 29 March 1987) was a Georgian linguist and philologist, born in Nogha, Samtredia. He was one of the founders of the Tbilisi State University (1918) and Academician of the Georgian Academy of Sciences (1941); Doctor of Philological Sciences (1920), Professor (1920). He became a doctor in Tbilisi State University. His most important Georgian works were in linguistic sciences.

Shanidze graduated from the St. Petersburg University in 1909. His numerous works heavily influenced modern scholarly research of the Georgian and its sister Kartvelian languages both in Georgia and abroad with his tutorship of the Norwegian Kartvelologist Hans Vogt.

Shanidze died in Tbilisi at the age of 100.

== Awards and honours ==
- Three Orders of Lenin (19 September 1953; 2 March 1967; 20 July 1971)
- Order of the October Revolution (20 July 1971)
- Order of the Red Banner of Labour (10 June 1945)
- Order of Friendship of Peoples (17 September 1975)
- Two Orders of the Badge of Honour (24 February 1941; 25 February 1987)
- Medal "For Labour Valour" (29 August 1960)
- Jubilee Medal "In Commemoration of the 100th Anniversary of the Birth of Vladimir Ilyich Lenin"

== See also ==
- List of Georgians
