= Ivane Javakhishvili =

Georgian historian and linguist (1876–1940)

- ივანე ჯავახიშვილი
- Born: 23 April 1876; Tbilisi, Russian Empire
- Died: 18 November 1940 (aged 64); Tbilisi, Georgian SSR, Soviet Union
- Resting place: Park of Tbilisi State University
- Citizenship: Russian Empire→ Democratic Republic of Georgia→ Soviet Union
- Occupations: Writer, historian, publisher, linguist
- Known for: Founder of Tbilisi State University

Ivane Alexandres dze Javakhishvili (Georgian: ივანე ჯავახიშვილი; 23 April 1876 – 18 November 1940) was a Georgian historian and linguist whose works heavily influenced the modern scholarship of the history and culture of Georgia. He was one of the founding fathers of the Tbilisi State University (1918) and its rector from 1919 to 1926.

== Biography ==
Ivane Javakhishvili was born in Tbilisi, Georgia (part of Imperial Russia at the time) to the aristocratic family of Prince Alexander Javakhishvili, who served as an educator at the Tbilisi Gymnasium. Having graduated from the Faculty of Oriental Studies of the St. Petersburg University in 1899, he became a privat-docent of the Chair of Armenian and Georgian Philology at his alma mater. From 1901 to 1902, he was a visiting scholar at the University of Berlin. In 1902, he accompanied his mentor, Academician Nikolai Marr, to Mount Sinai where they studied medieval Georgian manuscripts (such as the Georgian manuscripts of Saint Paul's letters). After the first volumes of Javakhishvili's monumental, but yet unfinished, kartveli eris istoria (A History of the Georgian Nation) appeared between 1908 and 1914, the young scholar quickly established himself as a preeminent authority on Georgian and Caucasian history, Georgian law, paleography, diplomacy, music, drama and other subjects, producing landmark studies in these fields.

Early in 1918, he was instrumental in founding Georgia's first regular university in Tbilisi, thus realizing a long-time dream cherished by generations of Georgian intellectuals but consistently frustrated by the Imperial Russian authorities. The Tbilisi University (present-day I. Javakhishvili Tbilisi State University, TSU, of his namesake), of which Javakhishvili became a professor and the head of the Department of the History of Georgia, rapidly assumed a dominant position in Georgia's educational life.

After a major role in founding Tbilisi State University Javakhishvili offered the role of its head to Petre Melikishvili. After Petre Melikishvili resigned in 1919, Javakhishvili became the second Rector of the University. He served until June 1926, when, in the aftermath of anti-Soviet August Uprising of 1924, tolerance of non-Marxist intellectuals began to contract. In 1936, the repression against Javakhishvili escalated, as TSU Rector Karlo Oragvelidze delivered a thesis at the Faculty of History that criticized his scientific work. Under the threat of Soviet oppression, the majority of Javakhishvili's associates and students failed to show their support.

Although he was permitted to publish and teach, this eclipse probably saved his life, since his successor at the university, was among the victims of the Great Purge of 1936–7. He was forced to step down at TSU in 1938, but was soon appointed director of the Department of History at the State Museum of Georgia, which he headed until his death in Tbilisi in 1940. He was interred at the yard of the TSU.

== Legacy and works ==
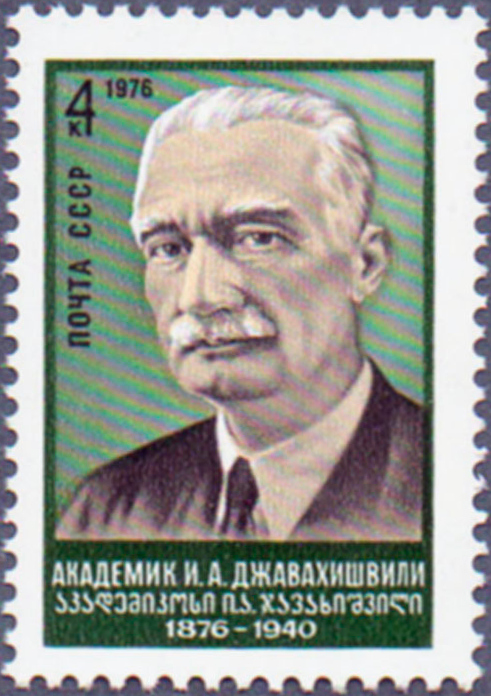
Javakhishvili on a 1976 Soviet stamp

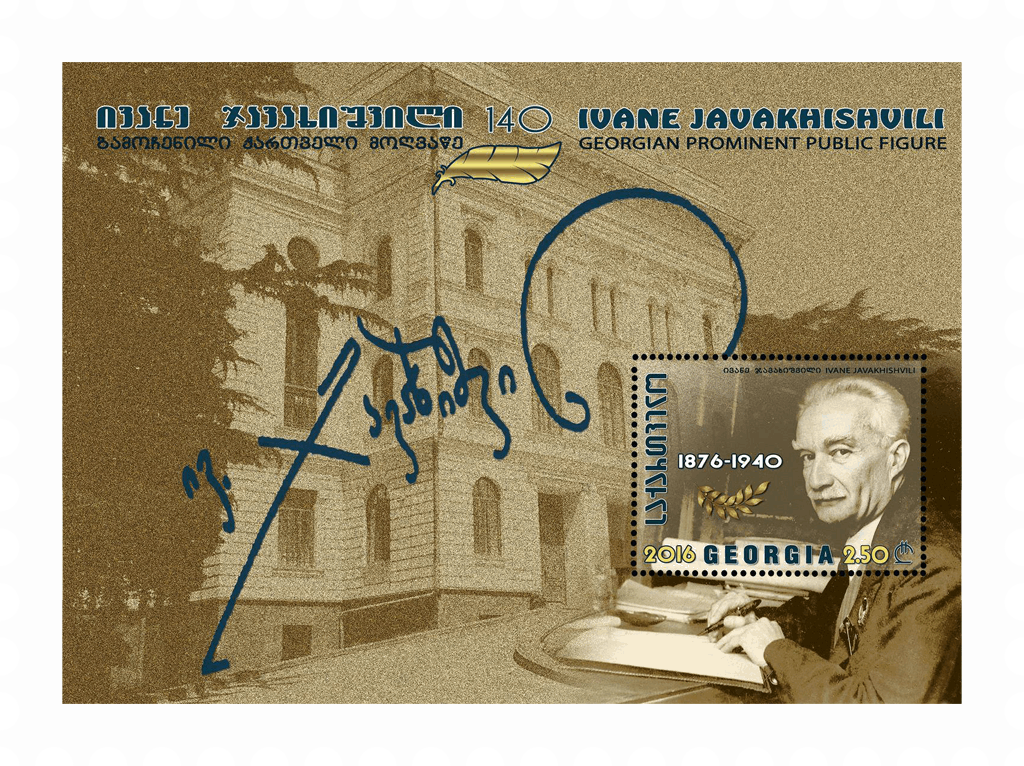
Javakhishvili on a 2016 stamp of Georgia . Artist; G. Kartvelishvili

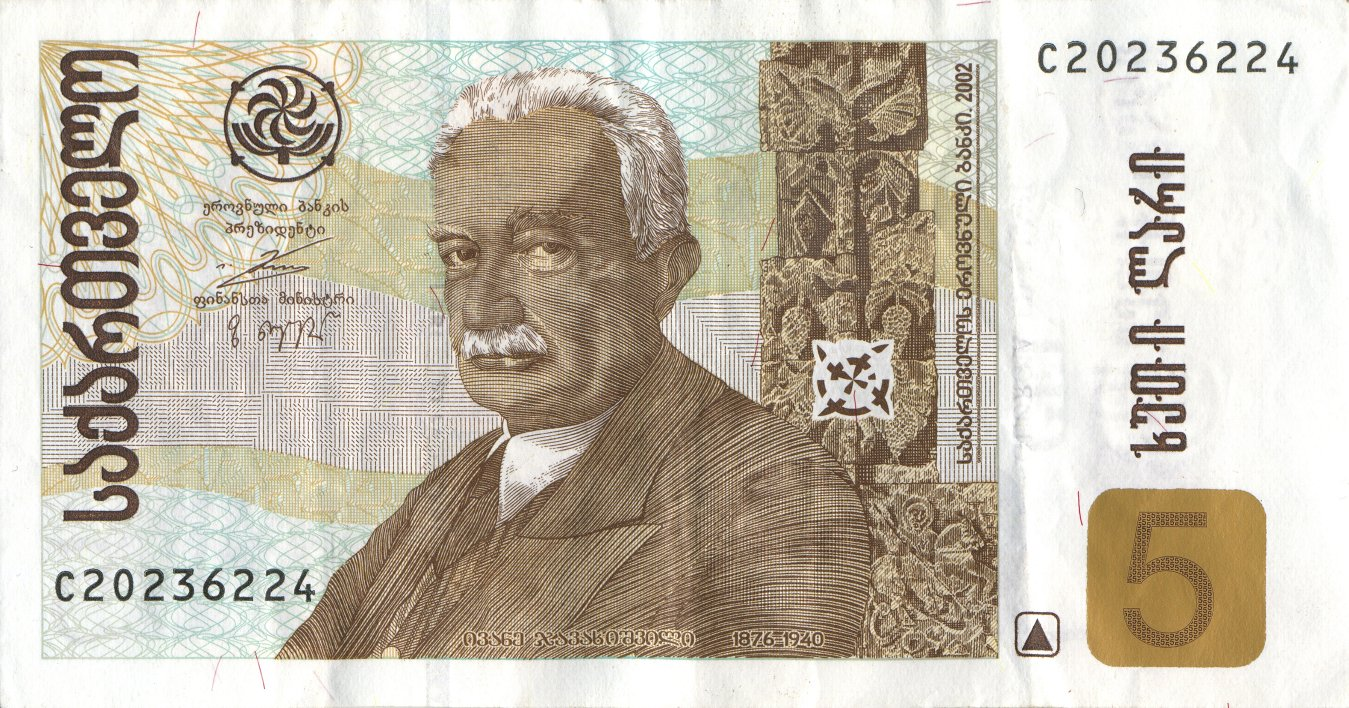
Javakhishvili on a Georgian 5 lari 2002 banknote

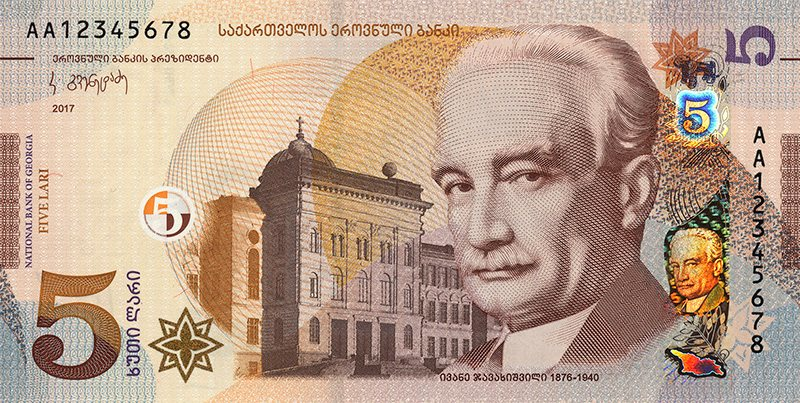
Javakhishvili on a new edition 5 Lari banknote (2017)

Javakhishvili authored more than 170 works dealing with various aspects of Georgia's political, cultural, social and economic history. Since the publication of its first edition in 1908, his main work, A History of the Georgian Nation (fully published between 1908 and 1949), has remained one of the most comprehensive and eloquent treatments of pre-modern Georgian history. Several of Javakhishvili's most influential articles and books including A History of the Georgian Nation have been reprinted in his twelve-volume collected works from 1977 and 1998.
