= Tedo Sakhokia =

Georgian ethnographer (1868–1956)

- თედო სახოკია
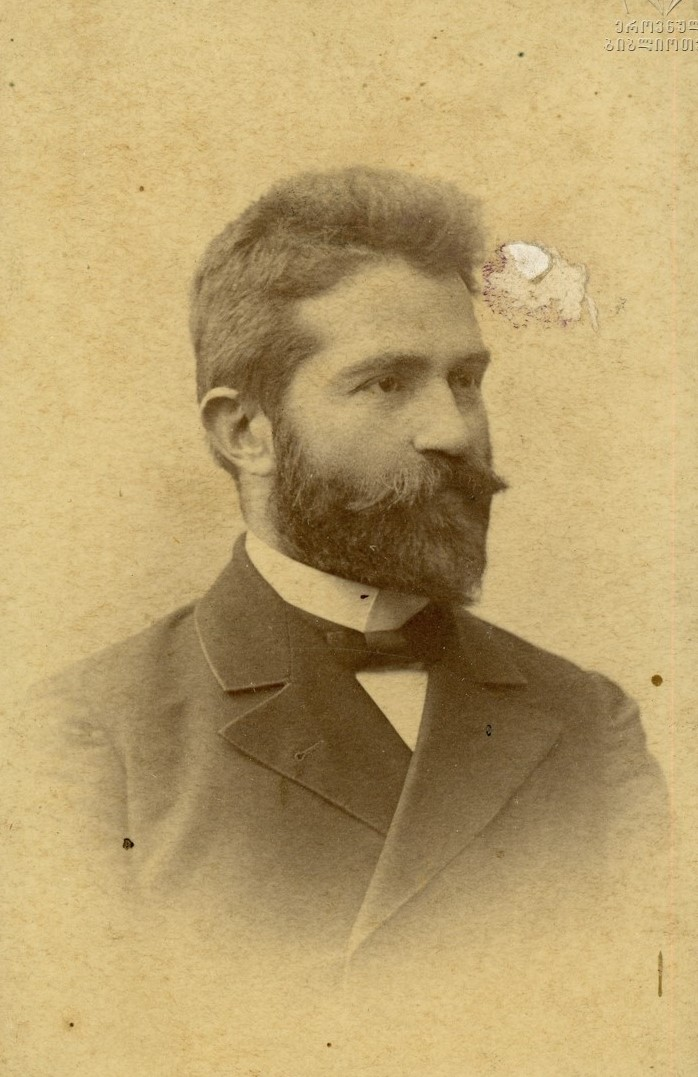
- Tedo Sakhokia in 1899
- Born: March 15, 1868; Kheta, Kutais Governorate, Russian Empire
- Died: February 17, 1956 (aged 87); Tbilisi, Georgian Soviet Socialist Republic
- Resting place: Didube Pantheon
- Citizenship: Russian Empire; Democratic Republic of Georgia; Georgian Soviet Socialist Republic
- Education: Tbilisi Spiritual Seminary; University of Geneva; University of Paris
- Spouse: Nade Kekelia
- Scientific career
- Fields: Ethnography; Folklore studies Lexicology

Tedo Sakhokia (Georgian: თედო სახოკია; March 15, 1868 – February 17, 1956) was a Georgian ethnographer, lexicologist, folklore scientist, translator, opinion journalist and educator, Correspondent Member of the Académie de Reims (1902) and Foreign Correspondent Member of the Society of Anthropology of Paris (1904).

== Biography ==
Tedo Sakhokia attended classes in Tbilisi Spiritual Seminary, from where he was expelled because of illegal activities. He attended universities in Paris, Geneva and Brussels. Tedo Sakhokia was a member of Liberty League. He was the leader of the Georgian Party, a political movement and co-edited the newspaper "Georgia" from 1903 to 1905.

Tedo Sakhokia was arrested in 1905 for attempting to bring weapons into Georgia illegally. In 1908, he was deported to Siberia, through which he fled to Europe, settling in Belgium, France, and England until 1916. After returning to Georgia, he became more actively involved in scientific and social activities, particularly in the restoration of the Georgian Church's autocephaly.

Tedo Sakhokia was the first Georgian figure who received specialized ethnographic education. He wrote several well-known works, including "Travelings (Guria, Adjara, Samurzakano and Abkhazia)," "Ethnographic Writings, "How We Grew Up in the Old Time" and "Georgian Imaginative Words and Sayings". His ethnographic papers have appeared in Georgian, English, Russian, Italian, and French translations.

Tedo Sakhokia worked closely with the Society for the Spreading of Literacy among Georgians. He was a regular contributor to Georgian and foreign magazines and newspapers such as Tsnobis Furtseli, Moambe, Droeba, Sakhalkho Gazeti, Кавказ, etc.

Tedo Sakhokia was a translator as well. He translated Giovanni Boccaccio's "The Decameron" and Giuseppe Garibaldi's "Clelia" from Italian, and works by Voltaire, Guy de Maupassant, Emile Zola, Alphonse Daudet, François Coppée, Henri Barbusse, and Octave Mirbeau from French, Ivan Vazov's "Under the Yoke" from Bulgarian and Cornelius Borozdin's “Samegrelo” and “Serfdom in Samegrelo“ from Russian.

== Ancestry ==
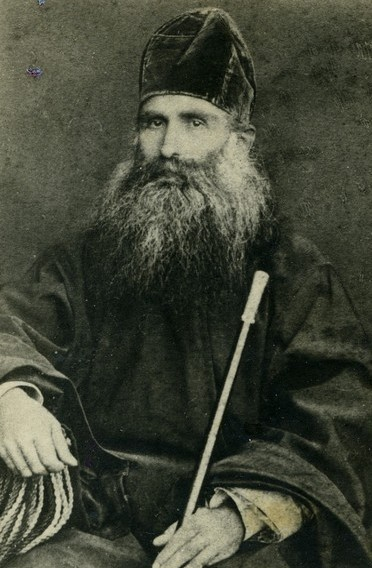
Timote Sakhokia in 1886

According to Tedo Sakhokia, his distant ancestor was Gamkrelidze from Racha, who relocated to Lechkhumi as a result of the murder. Because of Mouravi Chikovani's murder, his sons were forced to flee to Samegrelo. Two brothers settled in Shkhepi and adopted the surname Sakhokia, while two others took the surname Gakhokia.

Tedo Sakhokia's great-grandfather was a priest of nobleman Dadiani. Sakhokias were in charge of picking common nettles for lord and fasters in the palace during Great Lent, hence why they were dubbed "nettler" Sakhokias. Great-grandfather (from father's side) was a goldsmith and his family was considered as a prosperous family. Timote (1832-1887), Tedo Sakhokia's father, was from Shkhepi and worked as a priest at St. George's Church in Kheta. Mother Elizabeth was daughter of the same church's priest, David Kukava.

== Early life and education ==
=== Childhood ===
Tedo Sakhokia was born on 15 March 1868 in Kheta in Zugdidi Uezd (now Khobi Municipality). His family was regarded as wealthy and esteemed family. According to mingrelian tradition of that time, Irine Lataria and Utotia Iosava took Tedo to a neighbouring village and raised him till he was three years old.

In 1872 Tedo Sakhokia returned to Kheta, but his family soon relocated to Sukhumi. Tedo Sakhokia's mother died in 1874 and Timote Sakhokia was left to raise four daughters and two sons alone.

Tedo Sakhokia was five years old when he learned to read and write in Russian and enrolled in "Горская школа" but as the Russo-Ottoman war approached, Timothy Sakhokia relocated his family to Kheta, bringing church items with him.

=== Spiritual seminary ===
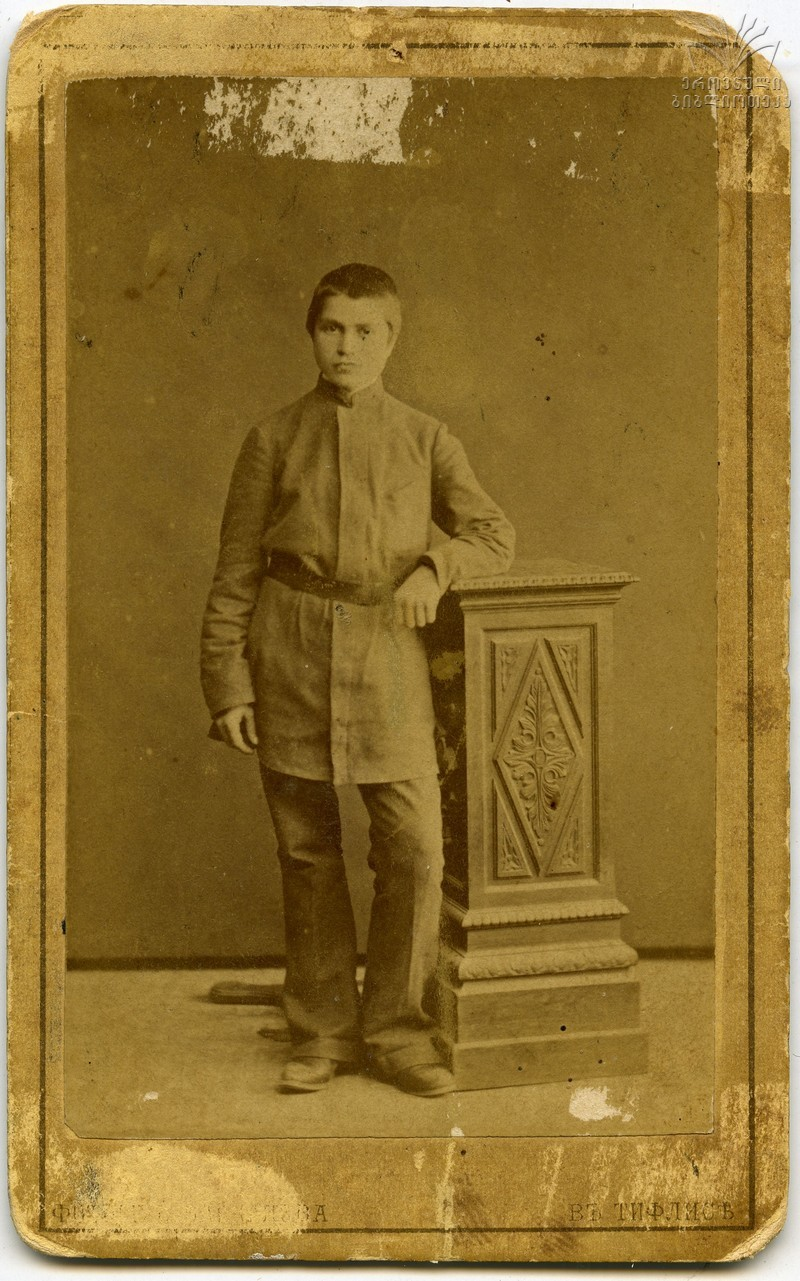
Tedo Sakhokia in 1884

Admission to Martvili Spiritual School required fluency in Georgian literacy. That's why Timote Sakhokia sent his son to priest Shio Iosava, with whom Tedo lived for nearly a year but still couldn't learn to read or write in Georgian. Tedo Sakhokia was admitted to the Martvili Spiritual School in 1877, but due to his lack of Georgian literacy, he was placed in the first preparatory class. Tedo Sakhokia lived in Ivane Odisharia's home, where Besarion and Giorgi Khelaia also resided. Tedo was taught to read and write in Georgian by Besarion (later the Catholicos-Patriarch of All Georgia Ambrosius Khelaia). While Tedo Sakhokia was in school, Vasil Barnov also taught him.

Tedo Sakhokia graduated from Martvili Spiritual School in 1884. Due to his age, he was unable to enroll in the second class at Kutaisi Classical Gymnasium. On the other hand, he was admitted to the first class of the Tbilisi Spiritual Seminary in the same year without exams because he had graduated from the first degree of the Spiritual School.

While studying at the Tbilisi Spiritual Seminary, he befriended Shio Dedabrishvili and Ioseb Laghiashvili with whom he shared Socialist beliefs. In his second year, Tedo Sakhokia also met Alexander Jabadari and Zakaria Chichinadze, from whom he obtained "forbidden books." During this time, Tedo Sakhokia shared a home with Mikhail Tskhakaya. Tedo Sakhokia was expelled from the seminary on 21 February 1886, based on his own statement about engaging in illegal student activities.

=== High education ===
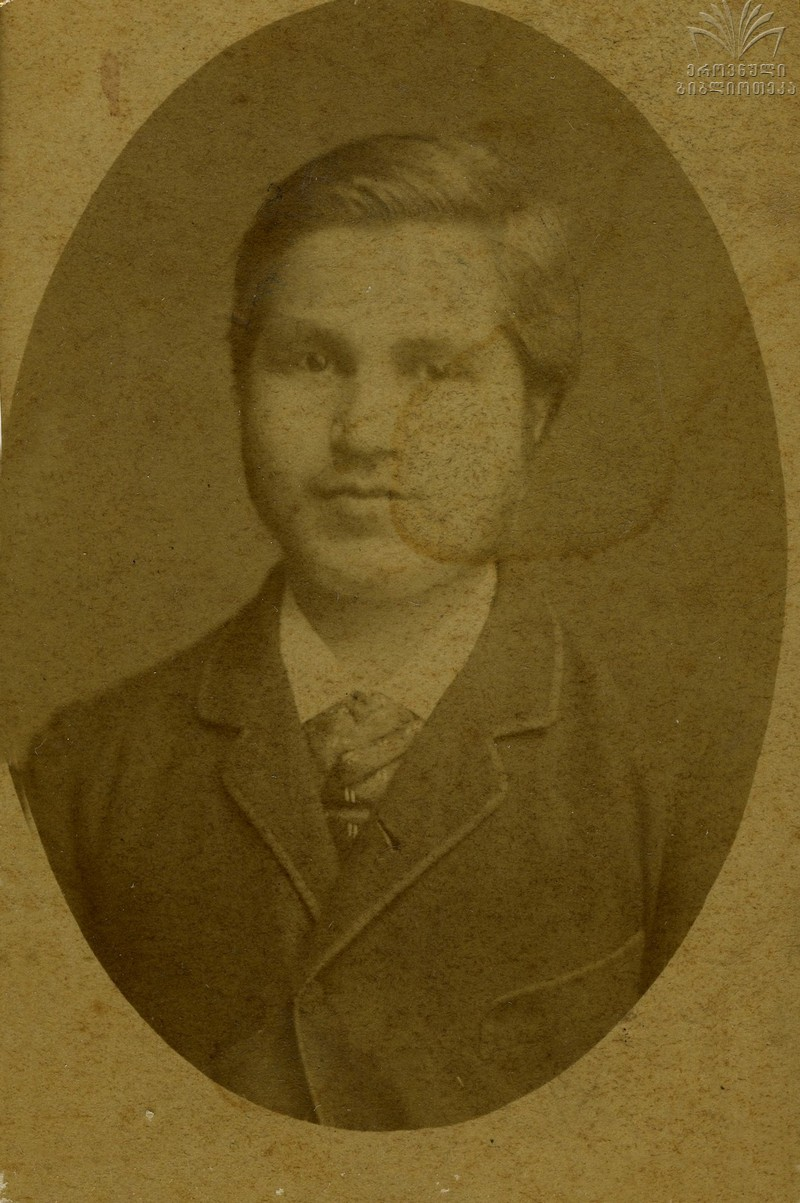
Young Tedo Sakhokia

After being expelled from the Tbilisi Spiritual Seminary, Tedo Sakhokia returned to Sukhumi. Agronomy was a relatively common occupation at the time and Timote Sakhokia sent his son to study agriculture in another country on the suggestion of Antim Jugheli. In the spring of 1886, Tedo Sakhokia arrived in Geneva, Switzerland, where he met Ivan Machvariani, a well-known writer and translator. On his suggestion, Tedo Sakhokia stayed in Geneva, studied French, and enrolled at the Faculty of Natural Sciences of University of Geneva. He established close ties with Georgian students there while pursuing his degree.

Tedo Sakhokia was compelled to return to Georgia after his father died in 1887. After that, he enrolled at the Department of History of the Sorbonne University in Paris, which offered free tuition. Despite this, Tedo Sakhokia did not finish the course and returned to Georgia in 1889.

Tedo Sakhokia arrived in Tiflis in 1900 and agreed to work '"Tsnobis Furtseli" and "Moambe" from abroad. He mailed Feuilletons four times a month on average from abroad. Kirion II of Georgia, the Catholicos-Patriarch of All Georgia, has offered to help him financially throughout his stay abroad.

Tedo Sakhokia traveled to Paris in 1900, where he attended a World's fair. Hi was the Georgian delegation's correspondent. He subsequently went to the High School of Anthropology in Paris, where he spent four years. In addition to his studies, he attended De Mortilie seminars, weekly scientific expeditions, and scientific discussions. Tedo Sakhokia's "Georgian Proverbs," which included Shota Rustaveli's aphorisms, was published in French during this time period. He was elected to the Académie de Reims as a Correspondent Member in 1902. Also, he was elected as a Foreign Correspondent Member of the Society of Anthropology of Paris in 1904.

== 1890-1900 ==
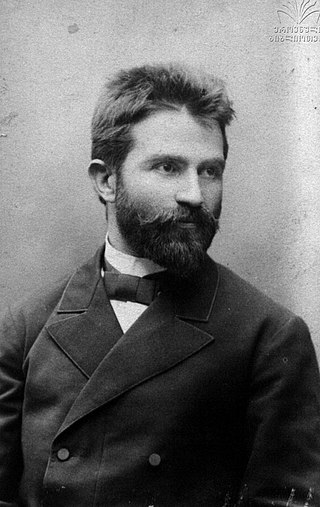
Tedo Sakhokia in 1891

Tedo Sakhokia worked in a variety of jobs between 1890 and 1894 to support himself: Worked as a forester (in Borjomi), as a foreign correspondent in the industry of Nikoloz Ghoghoberidze (in Zestaponi), as a member of "Georgian Cooperation of Book Publishers". In 1894 he started working in "Phylloxerian Group" (Georgian: ფილოქსერიის დასი). During this time, Tedo Sakhokia was primarily focused on researching the situation in western Georgian communities. In the fight against grape disease, he sought to enhance the level of awareness among peasants.

From 1895 to 1897 Tedo Sakhokia lived in Tbilisi and engaged in publishing activities of the "Georgian Cooperation of Book Publishers". During this time, he released the following books: "აკაკის ნაკვესები" (1895), "Russian-Georgian Dictionary" (1897) and translation of Hans Christian Andersen's fairy tale The Wild Swans (1997).

== Political life ==
=== Liberty League of Georgia ===
In 1892 Liberty League was founded in Kutaisi by Georgian students from Russian and European universities. Most of its founders were from Universities of Warsaw, Kiev, St. Petersburg, Moscow, Kharkiv and Odessa. Tedo Sakhokia became a member of the organization in 1892. Tedo Sakhokia secretly corresponded with Shio Aragvispireli, Vakhtang Ghambashidze, and others to popularize the group and recruit new members.

The Russian government's gendarmerie has intercepted correspondence between members of the organization. Tedo Sakhokia was arrested on September 20, 1894, accusation for communicating with Shio Dedabrishvili and participating with the "Liberty League of Georgia" and was sent to Kutaisi's prison the following day. Three months later, he was freed from prison, however, he was still being watched by the police and gendarmerie.

=== Georgian Party ===
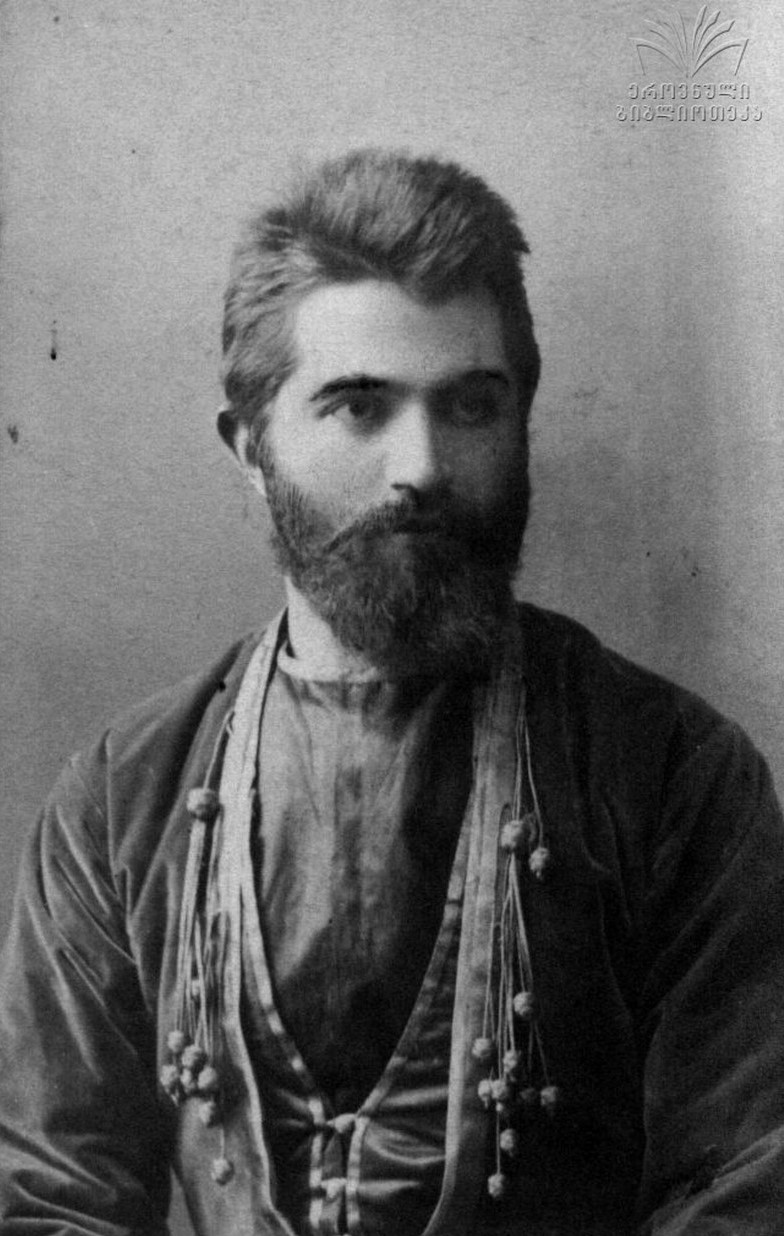
Tedo Sakhokia in 1893

Tedo Sakhokia relocated to Sukhumi in 1898. He was the leader of a political movement, known as the "Georgian Party", in Abkhazia, and with Antim Jugheli, Ivane Gegia, Grigol Kandelaki and others, was an outspoken opponent of Russia's russification policy. With Tedo Sakhokia fought Spiridon Norakidze, Ivane Burchuladze, Ivane Gegia, and Parna Davitaia fought. "Georgian Party" members were clergy: Protoiereus David Matchavariani; priests: Avksenty Sakhokia and Ivane Chkhenkeli, and future Catholicos-Patriarchs of All Georgia: St. Kyrion II, Leonid of Georgia and Ambrosius of Georgia.

Tedo Sakhokia and his associates generally corresponded with one another and Tedo Sakhokia was in charge of coordinating this correspondence. The activities of the "Georgian Party" and Tedo Sakhokia were soon investigated by authorities of the Russian Empire. The indictment took them four years to write but with the support of his friends, Tedo Sakhokia was able to flee to Europe. After this, "Georgian Party's" operations slowed considerably.

=== Newspaper "Georgia" ===
Tedo Sakhokia traveled to Italy in the summer of 1901. In Rome he assisted Mikhail Tamarashvili in preparing his manuscripts for publishing. Then he went to Tuscany for two months. Tedo Sakhokia became a close friend with Archil Jorjadze after returning to France, and he assisted him with remembering the Georgian language.

In 1902, it was determined to be printed the illegal newspaper "Georgia" in Paris. The inaugural edition along with the French counterpart ("La Georgie") was released the following year. Tedo Sakhokia was a co-editor of the newspaper with Archil Jorjadze and Giorgi Laskhishvili and was involved in the unlawful distribution of it in Georgia. Tedo Sakhokia was sentenced to five years in prison and deported to Siberia by the Emperor's administration, but he assisted himself by emigration to Novorossiysk, where he secured a foreign passport, and then returning to Paris.

After temporarily returning from France Tedo Sakhokia and other members of the Georgian Socialist-Federalist Revolutionary Party had meeting with Ilia Chavchavadze. They begged him to support in the newspaper and other financial concerns, but the meeting failed.

=== Weapons smuggling and exile ===
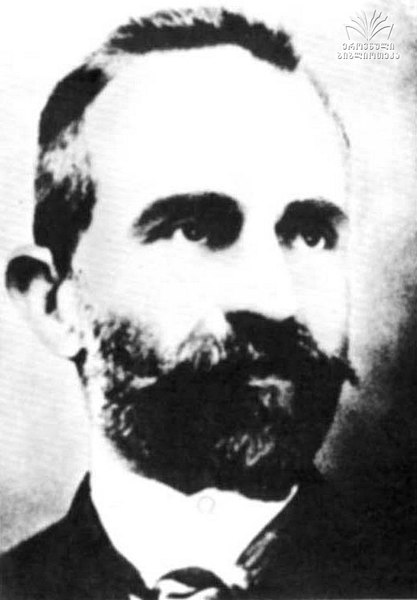
Tedo Sakhokia

In 1904, at the conference of the Georgian political movements and groups in Geneva, Georgian Socialist-Federalist Revolutionary Party was created. At that time Tedo Sakhokia should have been a member of the party. Although it is uncertain what his alias was, he was included among the participants of the Geneva meeting.

in 1905, Tedo Sakhokia was ordered by George Dekanozishvili, one of the leaders of the Socialist-Federalist Party in France, to accept illegally smuggled weaponry from abroad and meet people in various places of the Black Sea. After returning in Georgia Tedo Sakhokia communicated with Mikhail Esakia, the chairman of the Poti committee of the party. They also established committees in Batumi and Sukhumi. While being in Batumi Tedo Sakhokia and Alexander Jabadari met David Kldiashvili but did not get any important support from him. In the same year, the Dutch ship "Sirius" transported weapons purchased in Switzerland into Georgia, some of which were handed to the public, some of which were seized by the government, and some of which were dumped into the sea.

The case of weapons smuggling into Georgia has been referred to judicial authorities for review. Tedo Sakhokia was detained in February 1906. At his trial, he was represented by lawyers from St. Petersburg: Luarsab Andronikashvili and David Eristavi and lawyers from the Socialist-Federalist Party: Giorgi Gvazava and Iosif Baratov. He was imprisoned until May, when he was granted bail and freed.

In 1906 Tedo Sakhokia married and began working as a secretary of self-government of Sukhumi. In February of the following year, he was arrested once more. In September, he was found guilty and sentenced to an eternity in exile in Siberia. Tedo Sakhokia was released on bail while the Senate debated his case. He was allowed to stay in Sukhumi and not leave. Tedo Sakhokia traveled in Samegrelo to gather ethnographic materials with permission of the Caucasus Museum, the Society for the Spreading of Literacy among Georgians and the Ethnographic Museum of St. Petersburg.

As a result of Senate's decision, Tedo sakhokia was arrested again in September 1908. In November he was exiled to Irkutsk Oblast and lived in Zhigalovo from March to April. Tedo Sakhokia, when exiled, sent telegrams to Iakob Gogebashvili and Tedo Zhordania, requesting assistance with 5-5 tumans. On May 3, Tedo Sakhokia arrived in Irkutsk, where he met with Georgian anarchist Nestor Kalandarishvili. He was given a fake passport and a paper granting him permission to return to Georgia by the latter. Tedo Sakhokia arrived in Tbilisi without incident and proceeded to Batumi, where he met his spouse and daughter.

=== Emigration ===
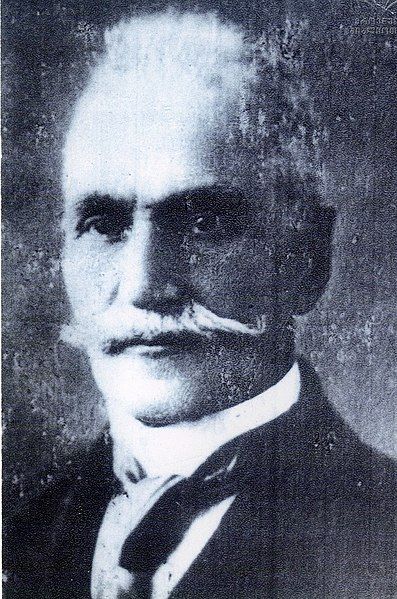
Tedo Sakhokia

Tedo Sakhokia has lived in a number of European nations throughout the years. During the second political emigration (1909-1916), he continued his scientific and political pursuits. In 1909 he went from Batumi to Turkey. In Hopa he met his Laz friend Bekir-Oghli, and his fellow party member Memed-Beg Abashidze in Trabzon. Tedo Sakhokia spent a short time in a Georgian Catholic church in Trabzon before traveling to Brussels via Marseille and Paris. Under the Belgian law he became protected and untouchable by the Belgian government from the Russian officials.

Tedo Sakhokia was assisted by his friend Paliko Kipiani throughout his stay in Belgium. Due to his wife's condition, he was unable to take his wife and children to Belgium. Tedo Sakhokia studied photography while attending electrical engineering school. He worked as a librarian, in a weapon factory, in a chocolate factory, and a number of other jobs while in exile.

Tedo Sakhokia continued his scientific research throughout his emigration. During this time he wrote letters to the Ethnographic Museum of Petrograd regarding Samegrelo and requested materials from his wife. Simultaneously, he wrote articles to the editorial offices of a number of Georgian periodicals and newspapers.

Tedo Sakhokia arrived in England in 1910 as a representative of one of the Chiatura's black stone industries, where he spent a year. He met Oliver Wardrop here, and after returning to Brussels, they kept in touch for the next 4–5 years. Tedo Sakhokia was allowed to return to Georgia by the Russian Imperial Court in 1916.

=== Soviet period ===
Tedo Sakhokia retired from political involvement after the August Uprising in 1924. He did not participate in the rebellion, but he backed the commanders and leaders and provided them with covert sanctuary. He eventually retreated from political activity, abandoned his pedagogical duties, and devoted himself exclusively to the public and scientific realms once the revolt was suppressed.

The Georgian National Opera and Ballet Theater of Tbilisi hosted a meeting in 1925 to debate the question of Samegrelo's secession and autonomy from Georgia. Tedo Sakhokia was elected as a chairman of the meeting. He was the first who read the report and was outspoken in his opposition to Samegrelo's autonomy.

In 1927 Henri Barbusse visited the Georgian SSR. During this time Tedo Sakhokia was imprisoned in Metekhi prison. His friends also gave the French writer the Georgian version of his novel "Under Fire" and requested for assistance in getting the translator out of prison. Tedo Sakhokia was imprisoned from September 20, 1927 - to October 13, 1927, according to correspondence between him and his daughter.

== Theology ==
Tedo Sakhokia's fight to develop the Georgian Church, have services conducted in Georgian, and attain church independence was part of the fight against Russification policy. Tedo Sakhokia's close friends were: Anton Kekelia, Ambrosius Khelaia (who helped him to learn Georgian language while he was in Martvili spiritual school), Kirion Sadzaglishvili (who assisted him financially while studying abroad), and Kalistrate Tsintsadze. He was close friend with Georgian Catholic monk and theologian Mikhail Tamrashvili for many years. Tedo Sakhokia paid him many visits in Italy and assisted him with the writing of the book "History of the Georgian Church."

Representatives were dispatched to various regions of Georgia to prepare public opinion before the proclamation of the autocephaly of the Georgian Church. Tedo Sakhokia, as a native of Samegrelo, was assigned to western Georgia. In September 1917, Tedo Sakhokia was elected as a member of the Catholicos Council with Protoiereus Nikoloz Talakvadze, Pavle Ingorokva, Mikhail Machabeli, P. Makhatashvili, Raphael Ivanicky and Christopher Kapanadze. In 1934 the Holy Synod was formed instead of the Catholicos Council which limited the inclusion of secular people in it. Tedo Sakhokial was likewise hampered by this constraint.

== Scientific life ==
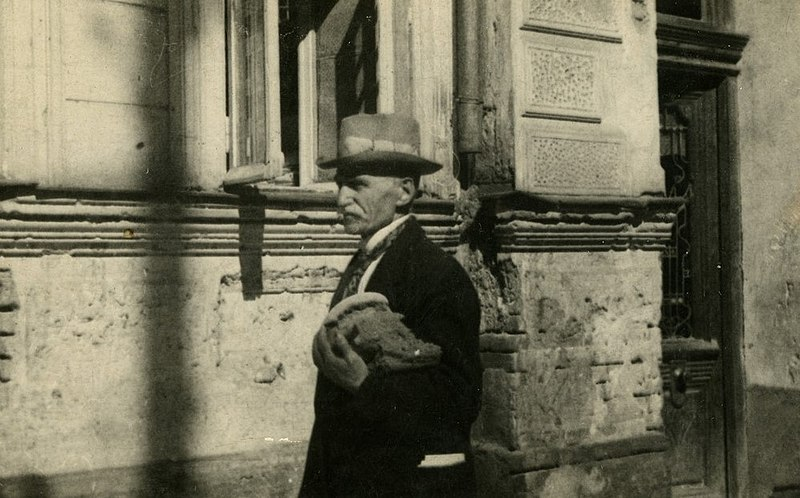
Tedo Sakhokia in 1941

Tedo Sakhokia extensively studied anthropology, then Georgian language, literature, ethnography, folklore, opinion journalism, lexicology, and other fields during his time in Paris. Simultaneously he took part in scientific expeditions and excursions and regularly published ethnographic papers in French, Italian, English, and Russian.

=== Pedagogy ===
After returning from France Tedo Sakhokia worked as a teacher in Tirdznisi in Kartli. During this time, he began collecting and publishing Georgian proverbs and lexical materials, as well as customs, historical and ethnographic materials. Niko Lomouri, Vazha-Pshavela and Bachana, Anastasia Eristavi-Khoshtaria, Nikoloz Janashia, and others were among the people he met in Kartli. Tedo Sakhokia's pedagogical work in the community allowed him connect with the people and broaden his work.

Tedo Sakhokia taught only one year in Kartli. He took initiative in dealing with issues at schoolს (especially in Abkhazian schools). He campaigned for the preservation of the Georgian language's purity, publishing Feuilletons and letters in journals and newspapers about various issues. In 1911, "Sakhalkho Gazeti" (Georgian: სახალხო გაზეთი) published a series of his feuilletons titled "Georgian Language (Modern Speaking and Writing)".

Tedo Sakhokia returned to Georgia after emigration and taught French language at the Tbilisi Spiritual Seminary and then Georgian and French languages in the VII Gymnasium of Tbilisi. In October, 1923, Tedo Sakhokia resigned from his position as a teacher.

=== Ethnography ===
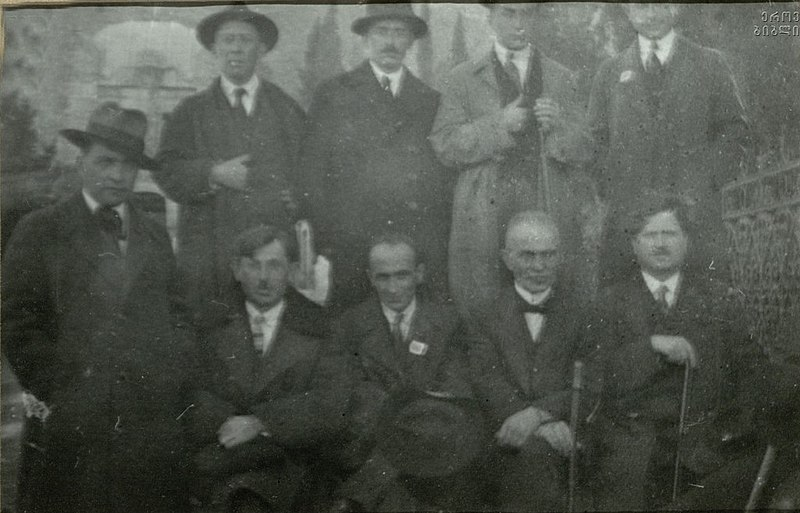
Tedo Sakhokia with Georgian scientists in 1928

Tedo Sakhokia was the first Georgian to obtain an ethnographic education. In his scientific work Tedo Sakhokia used ethnographic and field research methodologies that were well known in Europe. After returning to Georgia from France, he continued to research Georgians traditions and published ethnographic pieces in publications.

Tedo Sakhokia began working in Valerian Gunia's "Tsnobis Furtseli" in 1896. During this time, he decided to travel to different regions of Georgia and describe the ethnography of the people who lived there. He visited Samurzakano, Guria, and Adjara, among other places. Their descriptions appeared in "Moambe" and "Tsnobis Furtseli" in 1897–1901. Tedo Sakhokia's ethnographic and folklore writings were collected in a separate book entitled "Travelings: Guria, Adjara, Samurzakano, Abkhazia," which was released in 1950.

Tedo Sakhokia traveled to Racha in 1898, but he misplaced his records and was unable to find it. He traveled to Abkhazia the following year. The records given to a friend were lost in 1916, but the author discovered them in the Georgian Museum in 1936.

In 1950 and 1956, Tedo Sakhokia published ethnographic articles and publicist ethnographic researches. The exhibition "Travelings" depicts a time of travel in Adjara, Guria, Samurzakano, and Abkhazia, as well as the lives of the people who live there and present ethnosocial processes. Agriculture, pastoral farming, beekeeping, handicrafts, settlement forms, clothing, modes of public transportation, residential and commercial buildings, marriage customs, forms of labor organization, customary law and religious customs are among the ethnographic observations made by Tedo Sakhokia. After Dimitri Bakradze and Giorgi Kazbegi, Tedo Sakhokia made a great contribution to the research of the life of Adjara.

"Ethnographic Writings," a study of Samegrelo's ethnographic materials, was published just two months after of Tedo Sakhokia's death in 1956. One of the earliest scholarly works about this topics in Georgian ethnography is "Wedding Customs in Samegrelo." Tedo Sakhokia discusses wedding limitations and restrictions, as well as different types of engagement and wedding ceremonies. Other publications by Tedo Sakhokia include: "New Year or Kalanda in Samegrelo," "From the Mingrelian Mythology" "The Cult of the Dead in Samegrelo," "The Cult of St. George and the Law of God," and others, all of which have significant contribution in the research of Georgian culture.

Tedo Sakhokia was a collector of ethnographic artefacts in addition to anthropological study. Simon Janashia Museum of Georgia, Russian Museum of Ethnography, State Historical Museum, and the Museum of the French Anthropological Society have all maintained his collections.

=== Lexicology ===
In 1889, while working as a teacher in Kartli, Tedo Sakhokia became interested in collecting Georgian proverbs, imaginative phrases and lexical materials. "Georgian Imaginative Words and Sayings", a three-volume masterpiece, is the best of his works. In 1936 Tedo Sakhokia began organizing the materials, systematizing the definitions of terms and phrases, and classification of their origins. More than 7000 lexical elements are included in the work. After finishing the work, he gave the book to the Nikolai Marr Institute of Language, History and Material Culture, but due to the onset of World War II, publishing was delayed. In 1950, 1954, and 1955, the three-volume set was originally published. Tedo Sakhokia's collection of "Georgian Proverbs" was published in 1967. In 1937 Tedo Sakhokia's article "Imaginative Words and Sayings in the Knight in the Panther's Skin" was published in Nikolai Marr Institute of Language, History and Material Culture Moambe which contained 208 definitions of words and phrases.

=== Folklore studies ===
Tedo Sakhokia developed an interest in folklore at a young age, and his interest was piqued further while studying in the seminary by Georgian historian Tedo Zhordania.

Georgian folklore plays a significant role in Tedo Sakhokia's literary legacy. He obtained rich folklore materials from the regions of western Georgia while gathering ethnographic materials. Tedo Sakhokia gathered oral histories, labor poems, ritual poetry samples, mythological narratives, and fairy tales, among other things. Tedo Sakhokia's great interest in Mingrelian folklore materials is evident in his letters to Nade Kekelia and Tedo Jordania. "Travelings: Guria, Adjara, Samurzakano, Abkhazia", "Ethnographic Writings," "Ethnography of Samegrelo," "Georgian Imaginative Words and Sayings", and other volumes by the author contain folklore materials.

=== Translation ===
Tedo Sakhokia was a translator from Bulgarian, French, Italian, Russian and English language. In 1888, he began his literature and translation career. Tedo Sakhokia's translation of Jules Lemet's short story "The King's Daughter Mimi and Her Sweethearts" appeared in the 164th issue of "Iveria" this year. Guy de Maupassant and other French writers were later translated and published by Tedo Sakhokia. He translated Polish writer Zygmunt Miłkowski's novel "W zaraniu", Ivan Vazov's "Under the Yoke", etc., which were first published in "Moambe" and afterwards in their own volumes.

Victor Hugo's "The Last Day of a Condemned Man," which was published separately in 1891 in Georgia, was translated by Tedo Sakhokia. Giovanni Boccaccio's The Decameron in two volumes and Guy de Maupassant's three collections of short stories was published in Georgian from 1924 to 1936. Tedo Sakhokia translated "Clelia" by Giuseppe Garibaldi from Italian, as well as works by Voltaire, Émile Zola, Henri Barbusse ("Under Fire") and Octave Mirbeau from French. He also translated scientific books, such as Cornelius Borozdin's "Samegrelo" and "Serfdom in Samegrelo" from Russian.

Tedo Sakhokia also worked as a translator from Georgian into other languages. He translated "ქართული ანდაზები" ("Georgian Proverbs") into French and Italian. His article "The Animal Folklore in Georgia" was published in English-language anthropological journal "Man". A number of scientific works about Georgian culture have been published in "Петербургския ведомости" and "Брачные обряды в Мингрелии" in Russian.

== Public life ==
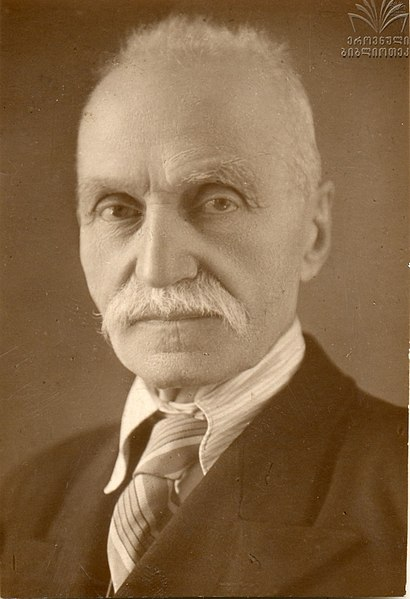
Tedo Sakhokia

Tedo Sakhokia was an active member of the Georgian Culture Society of Amateurs. He was elected as a full member of the Historical and Ethnographic Society of Georgia on April 27, 1908. Tedo Sakhokia bought museum exhibits and anthropological items in the Akhaltsikhe-Akhalkalaki uezd and the Borjomi Gorge under the direction of the same society. In 1912, he presented this society with a French translation of his work, "Les proverbs Georgiens". According to the list dated January 1, 1913, he is no longer a member of this society. Tedo Sakhokia was also actively involved in the activities of the Writers' Union of Georgian SSR.

=== Society for the Spreading of Literacy among Georgians ===
Tedo Sakhokia was an active member of the Society for the Spreading of Literacy among Georgians. While still a student in Geneva, he addressed the society, requesting financial and book assistance.

The society put out a program in 1882 "for the gathering materials of Georgian orality", which contained samples of folk wisdom from various regions of Georgia, but Samegrelo was left out. Tedo Sakhokia wrote a letter to Iveria in 1891 titled "For Whom Folk Art Loves" to address this problem. He encouraged readers to provide Mingrelian oral tradition samples, such as fairy tales, shairs, proverbs, spells, poems, etc. He requested that it be collected in Mingrelian language (written with Georgian letters).

Even though his case was being considered in court, Tedo Sakhokia maintained his relationship with the Society for the Spread of Literacy among Georgians. With the society's assistance, he proceeded to Samegrelo in 1908 to collect anthropological materials.

=== Opinion journalism ===
Tedo Sakhokia routinely published letters, feuilletons, and other papers in journals concerning various regions of Georgia, as well as noteworthy events or concerns. He also supplied publications and newspapers with materials from other countries (Switzerland, France, Belgium, Italy, England). He also published papers in Russian, English, French and Italian.

==== 1889–1900 ====
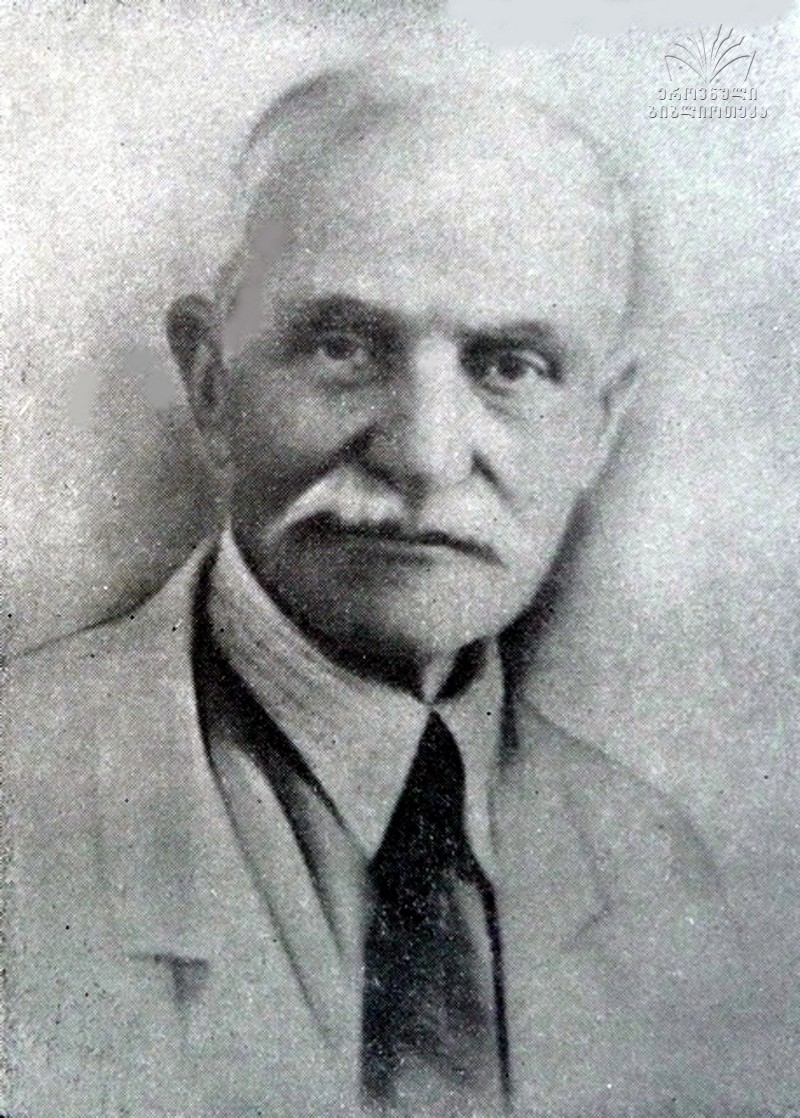
Tedo Sakhokia

Tedo Sakhokia worked for Iveria in 1889–1893 after returning to Georgia from Switzerland. Simulthaneously to his instructional work, he gathered folklore samples, fairy tales, and other materials and published them in local newspapers. In 1890, Iveria published "Tariel's Tale or The Knight in the Panther's Skin", which he recorded in Tirdznisi. Tedo Sakhokia also wrote about agriculture and economy, describing the economic situation in Tsilkani in letters published in Iveria in 1892, harvest in Vladikavkaz, etc. He often commented on contemporary events, such as the spread of cholera in Zestaponi and the battle to stop it.

Tedo Sakhokia started publishing purposeful propaganda in periodicals such as "Moambe," "Kvali," "Tsnobis Furtsel," and others beginning in 1895. From 1898, he began publishing Abkhazia-related articles in newspapers published throughout the Russian Empire, including "Петербургское ведемости". Tedo Sakhokia wrote a letter "Из Сухума" to this publication, on July 1, 1900, discussing the persecution of the Georgian language: The Georgian language was forbidden from schools and churches in Abkhazia, and worship in Georgian was prohibited. The letter drew a lot of attention from both the general public and government officials. Tedo Sakhokia wrote articles about rural life in the periodical "Кавказ" from 1894 to 1898, specifically, about Shida Kartli's important difficulties, such as schools, farmer living conditions, harvest, diseases, etc.

Tedo Sakhokia released a book titled "აკაკის ოხუნჯობანი" in 1895 that was met with skepticism. The letter "Two New Books" by Artem Akhnazarov was published in one of the issues of the newspaper Iveria. Tedo Sakhokia took it as a personal affront and filed a lawsuit against the editors. The case was considered by the district court on July 24, 1896, and the complaint was deemed to be invalid, while Ilia Chavchavadze was declared not guilty. Tedo Sakhokia filed an appeal, and the case was reheard in the court, but the verdict was upheld.

Tedo Sakhokia's "Russian-Georgian Dictionary" was published in 1897. In the same year, Mitropane Laghidze's letter was published in one of the issues of the newspaper "Kvali", in which Tedo Sakhokia was severely attacked for mistakes of the translation. A critical remark was also published in "Iveria," in which the author (using the pen name "Georgian from Fereydan") chastised Tedo Sakhokia for inventing and misusing new vocabulary words.

==== 1901–1905 ====
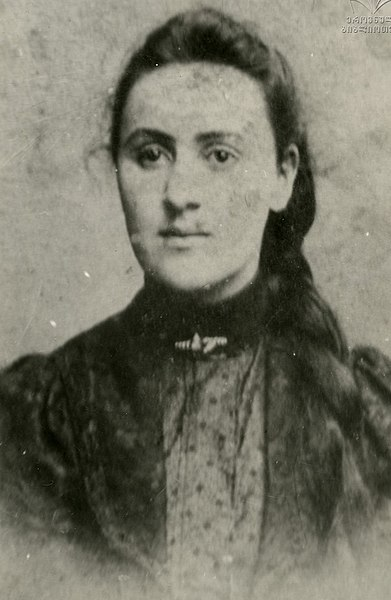
Nade Kekelia ― Tedo Sakhokia's wife

In 1901 Tedo Sakhokia wrote a unique letter in response to Ivan Vazov's letter "A Brief Overview of the Historical Life of the Georgian Nation," in which the Bulgarian writer gave information about Georgia and Georgians.

Tedo Sakhokia participated in the Sukhumi board administration elections in 1903. He was elected as a mouravi of the city, but his candidacy was rejected by the government, therefore Vasil Abuladze was elected in his place. Berens, a former Mouravi of Sokhumi, sued Tedo Sakhokia for abusing him in November of the same year. The court discovered that Berens was dismissing cases without the agreement of the city councils, for which Tedo Sakhokia verbally attacked him. Berens eventually denied Tedo Sakhokia's guilt, bringing the case to a close.

Tedo Sakhokia published a series of letters titled "Passenger Notes" in the newspaper "Tsnobis Furtseli" in 1903–1904, in which he reported what he had seen and experienced while traveling from Sukhumi to Gagra. He also spoke about issues in churches and schools. On April 1, 1905, a letter was published in "Tsnobis Furtseli" that was likewise critical of the Russification policy.

Tedo Sakhokia and Mikheil Tamarashvili had a disagreement in 1904 over a letter published in "Tsnobis Furtseli". Tedo Sakhokia discussed the disagreement, reasons, and predictions between France and the Pope in the letter. Mikheil Tamarashvili published a letter in "Iveria", chastising him for his one-sided interpretation of the problem and factual distortions. Their quarrel lasted a long time, but eventually they rekindled their friendship, and their scientific collaboration continued until Mikheil Tamarashvili's tragic death.

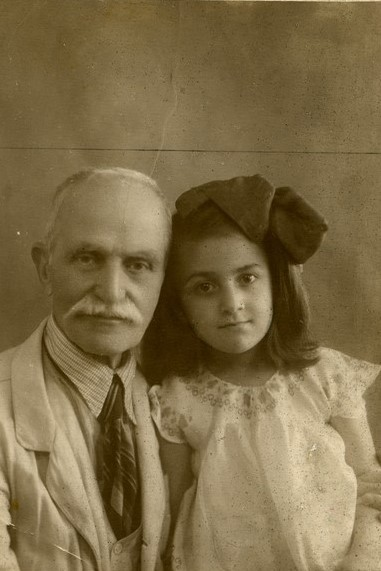
Tedo Sakhokia with his granddaughter

Tedo Sakhokia extensively collaborated with periodicals and newspapers before fleeing, including "Tsnobis Furtseli", "Droeba", "Sakhalkho Gazeti", "Arrow", "Traveler", etc. Even throughout his emigration, Tedo Sakhokia continued to collaborate with magazines. He was able to save his ailing wife and children thanks to the honorarium he received.

== Legacy ==
Tedo Sakhokia was honored on the 85th anniversary of his birth as well as the 65th anniversary of his creative and literary career on April 18, 1953.

Tedo Sakhokia's childhood recollections "How We Grew Up in the Old Time" were published in 1955.

Tedo Sakhokia died at the age of 87 on February 17, 1956. He was buried in the Didube Pantheon. His 100th birthday was commemorated with a jubilee evening at the Rustaveli Theater on June 17, 1968. Giorgi Leonidze opened the meeting. Reports about Tedo Sakhokia's life and works were read aloud by Solomon Tsaishvili, Konstantine Gamsakhurdia, Geronti Kikodze, Giorgi Chitaia, and others.

Tedo Sakhokia's collection titled "People of My Generation" was released in 1984 by Professor Solomon Khutsishvili.

Tedo Sakhokia Memorial House-Museum was opened Kheta, Khobi Municipality in 1990.

== Bibliography ==
- Bukia, L. (2017). Tedo Sakhokia and Georgian Folklore. Kartvelian Heritage. XIV. Scientific Collection. pp. 29–36.
- Bukia, L. (2018). Tedo Sakhokia: Life and Works (1868-1956). Tbilisi: The Saint Andrew the First-Called Georgian University. Dissertation.
- Itonishvili, V. (2000). Tedo Sakhokia's Contributions to Georgian Ethnography. Historical-ethnographic Studies I. Tbilisi: Ivane Javakhishvili Institute of History and Ethnography. pp. 3–15.
- Kacharava, V. (Ed.). (1976). Tedo Sakhokia's Correspondencies with Public Figures. Saistorio Moambe. 33–34. pp. 5–116.
- Manelashvili, A. (Ed.). (1984). Tedo Sakhokia's Correspondencies (1906-1941). Saistorio Moambe. 49–50. Tbilisi: „Science“. pp. 178–226.
- Sakhokia, T. (1943). My Autobiography. in The Autobiographies of the Writers, book I. Tbilisi. Literature Museum. pp. 125–159.
- Sakhokia, T. (1989). Tedo Sakhokia's Letters. Mnatobi 1. pp. 155–163.
- Sakhokia, T. (2012). In Siberia: Memories of the 1905 revolution. Tbilisi: Literature Museum. ISBN 978-99940-28-76-4.
- Surmanidze, R. (2004). Known and Unknown Tedo Sakhokia. Batumi: Adjara.
