= Ivane Javakhishvili Institute of History and Ethnology =

Georgian research institute

- Former names: Caucasus Historical-Archaeological Institute; Institute of Caucasian Studies; Institute of Language, History and Material Culture; Institute of History, Archeology and Ethnography
- Type: Research institute
- Established: July 1, 1917; 109 years ago
- President: Giorgi Cheishvili
- Location: Tbilisi, Georgia
- Website: institutehist.ucoz.net

Ivane Javakhishvili Institute of History and Ethnology (Georgian: ივანე ჯავახიშვილის სახელობის ისტორიისა და ეთნოლოგიის ინსტიტუტი Ivane Javaxishvilis saxelobis istoriis da etnologiis instituti) is a Scientific-research institute in Georgia. It originated from the Caucasus Historical-Archaeological Institute, founded in Tbilisi on July 1, 1917, with Nikolai Marr as its initiator and Ekvtime Takaishvili and Giorgi Chubinashvili as its real members. In 1931 the Department of Natural Sciences was added to the Institute and it was renamed the "Institute of Caucasian Studies".

In 1936, after another reorganization, the institute was renamed the "Academician Nikolai Marr Institute of Language, History and Material Culture", to which Ivane Javakhishvili was invited as a permanent consultant.

It was split on May 8, 1941, and two institutes were established on its basis: the Institute of History and the Academician. N. Marr Language Institute. Due to the expansion of archeological and ethnographic works, in 1964 the Institute of History was renamed the "Ivane Javakhishvili Institute of History, Archeology and Ethnography". In 1977, the Institute of History, Archeology and Ethnography was separated from the Archaeological Department, which was then established as an independent research center. Since 2006 the institute has been named "Ivane Javakhishvili Institute of History and Ethnology".

They worked at the institute at different times: Ekvtime Takaishvili, Giorgi Chubinashvili, Simon Janashia, Giorgi Akhvlediani, Nikoloz Berdzenishvili, Vukol Beridze, Giorgi Nioradze, Akaki Shanidze, Varlam Topuria, Giorgi Tsereteli, Arnold Chikobava, Giorgi Melikishvili, Simon Kaukhchishvili, Vera Bardaveli, Giorgi Chitaia and others. Since its establishment, the institute has been a major center for the study of Georgian history and the life and culture of the Georgian people.

== Caucasus Historical-Archaeological Institute ==
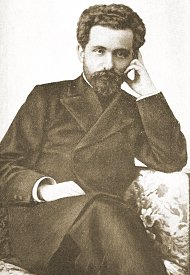
Nikolai Marr ― Founder of Caucasus Historical-Archaeological Institute

Nikolai Marr drafted the project for the establishment of the Academy of Sciences in Tbilisi in 1906, but the project could not be implemented at that time. After the February Revolution in 1917, the idea of founding the institute became a reality. On June 6 of the same year, the Russian Ministry of Education approved the charter and temporary states of the Caucasus Historical-Archaeological Institute. The official founding date of the institute is July 1, 1917.

The main purpose of the Caucasus Historical-Archaeological Institute was to study the language, history, and way of life of the Caucasus and related peoples (population of the Middle East), to develop disciplines related to Caucasian studies.

On September 6, 1917, according to the charter, Ekvtime Takaishvili and Giorgi Chubinashvili were elected as full members of the institute, and Dimitri Gordeev and Sirakan Tigraniani were elected as adjuncts (junior researchers). Alexander Shchepotiev was the acting secretary for a year, and then Dmitry Gordeev.

By a decree of the Scientific Council in December 1917, 45 scientists were notified about the establishment of the institute and asked to be involved in their activities as a member-employee. Among the addressees were: Ivane Javakhishvili, Korneli Kekelidze, Pavle Ingorokva, Iustine Abuladze, Ivane Orbeli, Vukol Beridze, Leon Melikset-Begi and others. However, only 9 scientists responded to the appeal.

In 1919, Giorgi Chubinashvili made plans for Tsnori and Ateni Sioni Church. Ekvtime Takaishvili visited churches and monasteries in Kutaisi and Racha in western Georgia and described church items. Dimitri Gordeev worked in Samegrelo for a month. In the same year, the Russian Academy of Sciences sent Professor Robert Pierpont Blake to work on Georgian manuscripts at the institute.

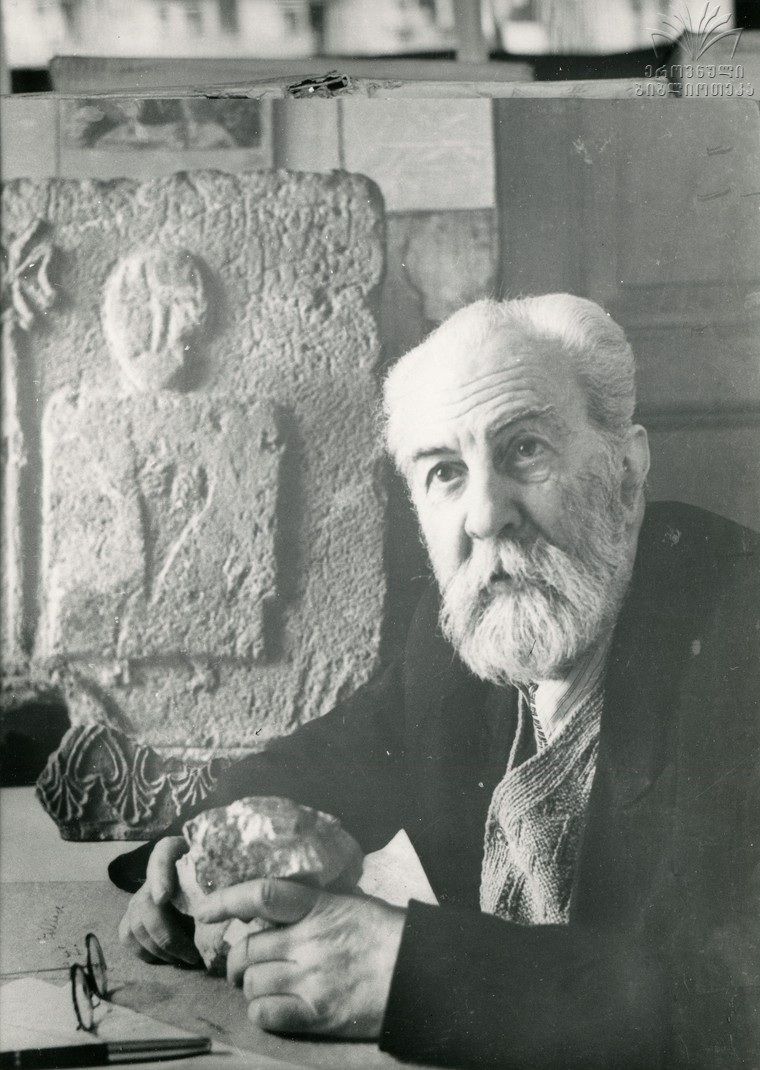
Giorgi Chubinashvili – member of the Caucasus Historical-Archaeological Institute in 1917 - 1924

In 1922–1931, the number of researchers at the Institute did not exceed 7. In 1921, Ekvtime Takaishvili guarded the treasure taken from Georgia to France and he also resigned from the position of deputy director of the institute. Giorgi Chubinashvili also left the institute in 1924. Sargis Kakabadze (1922), Mikheil Polievktov and Leon Melikset-Beg (1924), Vladimer Futuridze and Vera Bardavelidze (1930) started working at the institute at different times. In 1924, Vasil Bartold was elected as an honorary member of the institute.

In 1928, under the leadership of Sargis Kakabadze, a commission was set up at the institute to study Tbilisi, Mtskheta, and their districts. The commission explored Sioni, Anchisckhati, Vank, and other churches.

=== Expeditions ===
Scientific expeditions to study historical monuments played an important role in the activities of the Caucasus Historical-Archaeological Institute. In the summer of 1917, at the initiative of Nikolai Marr, expeditions were organized in Lazistan and Meskheti. Ioseb Kipshidze traveled to Lazistan for a month and a half and collected Chanuri texts, which were published in Enimki Moambe after his death in 1937. Davit Kipshidze, S. Lomia and Dimitri Gordeev traveled to Meskheti. Davit Kipshidze studied the frescoes of the great temple of Vardzia, and Dimitri Gordeev studied the painting of the walls of Sapara, Chulevi and Zarzma temples. Organized by the institute, scientific expeditions were organized in Lori province, Gori, Tsilkani and Saguramo, as well as in the regions of western Georgia. An ethnographic expedition was organized in Abkhazia.

== Institute of Caucasian studies ==
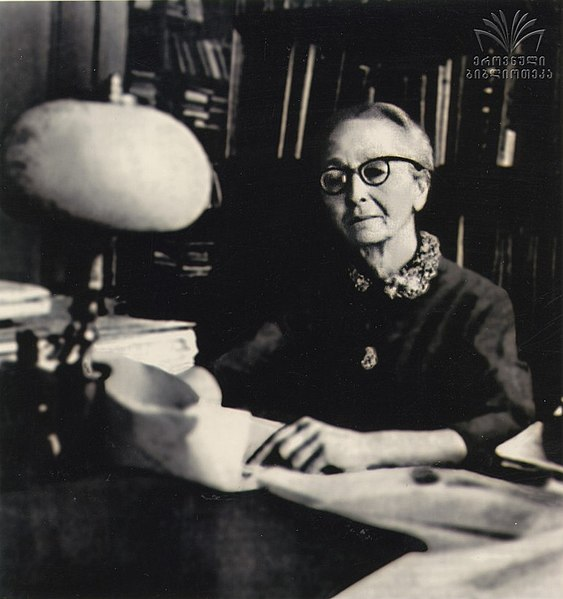
Vera Bardavelidze – Employee of the Ethnology Department of the Institute in 1930-1970

In 1931, the Department of Natural Sciences was added to the Caucasus Historical-Archaeological Institute and was renamed the "Institute of Caucasian Studies of the Academy of Sciences of the USSR". Departments of natural sciences and social sciences were established at the institute. The latter was divided into two sectors: speech culture (language, literature, folklore, toponymy) and history, economics and material culture. In the 1930s, along with the renaming of the institute, structural changes were also made. The positions of senior specialist, scientific specialist and scientific staff of different ranks have been established at the institute. Graduates of Tbilisi State University joined the institute at the same time. From 1930 the following people worked in the institute: Giorgi Nioradze, Vladimeri Puturidze, Vera Bardavelidze, Mikheil Polievktov; Since 1934: Giorgi Khachapuridze, Karpez Dondua, Grigol Natadze, Shalva Amiranashvili, Nikoloz Berdzenishvili, Sergi Zhgenti, Giorgi Tsereteli, Makar Khubua; Since 1935: Simon Janashia, Rusudan Kharadze, Akaki Shanidze, Giorgi Chitaia, Giorgi Akhvlediani.

In the 1930s, a postgraduate department was established at the institute. On December 20 of the same year, Nicolai Marr died. Following year the institute was renamed after him. In 1934 the departments of history and material culture and literature and language were opened in the institute, the following year - the sectors of the Middle East and ethnography, and in 1936 - the sector of history of Georgia, which initially employed only three scholars: Ivane Javakhishvili, Simon Janashia and Nikoloz Berdzenishvili.

On March 25, 1936, the Institute established 8 sectors: the Transcaucasian Peoples' History, the Transcaucasian Peoples' Languages, Ethnography and Archeology, the History of Georgia, Georgian Literature, the Middle East, the Geography Sectors, and the Nikolai Marr Cabinet.

== Institute of Language, History and Material Culture ==
=== Structure ===
Simon Janashia – Head of the History Sector of the institute (1937-1939) and Director (1936-1947)

The Nikolai Marr Institute of Language, History and Material Culture was located at N3 Mikheil Lermontov Street. According to Vladimer Machavariani, Ivane Javakhishvili was the "spiritual commander" of the institute, and Simon Janashia was the direct manager.

In 1936, by the decree of the Government of Georgia, the Archaeological and Anthropological Institutes under the People's Commissariat of Education of the Georgian SSR were abolished and joined the Ethnography and Archaeology Sector of the institute. The Terminology Committee was established at the Institute as a Department of Scientific Terminology, headed by Vukol Beridze. Giorgi Nioradze was appointed head of the Archaeology, Anthropology and Ethnography Sector, and Alexander Natishvili was Head of the Anthropology Sector. The Georgian Literature Sector of the institute was transferred to the Shota Rustaveli Institute of Literature at Tbilisi State University.

In 1937 the division of the institute into sectors was abolished and departments were formed. The Sectors of the History of the Transcaucasian Peoples and the History of Georgia were united in the History Department, headed by Simon Janashia, and since 1939, Nikoloz Berdzenishvili. In 1938 the Anthropology section was closed, and the Ethnography section was formed as a separate section. The following year, the Department of Philology was established, the Departments of Lexicology and Scientific Terminology were merged, and the Department of General Linguistics was established on the basis of two cabinets.

By 1940, the Institute of Language, History and Material Culture had nine departments:

1. Department of Kartvelian Languages (Head Akaki Shanidze)
2. Department of Caucasian Languages (Head Arnold Chikobava)
3. Department of Lexicology and Terminology (Head Vukol Beridze)
4. Department of History (Head Simon Janashia, From 1939 - Nikoloz Berdzenishvili)
5. Department of Ethnography (Head Giorgi Chitaia)
6. Department of Archaeology (Head Giorgi Nioradze)
7. Department of Middle East Languages (Head George Tsereteli)
8. Department of General Linguistics (Head Giorgi Akhvlediani)
9. Department of Philology (Head Akaki Shanidze, From 1940 - Simon Kaukhchishvili)

On November 7, 1939, the Scientific Council of the institute was granted the right to receive PhD and doctoral dissertations. On December 29 of the following year, the dissertation was defended by Alexi Robakidze, a junior researcher at the Ethnography Department. This was the first dissertation defended at the institute.

=== Scientific-Research activities ===
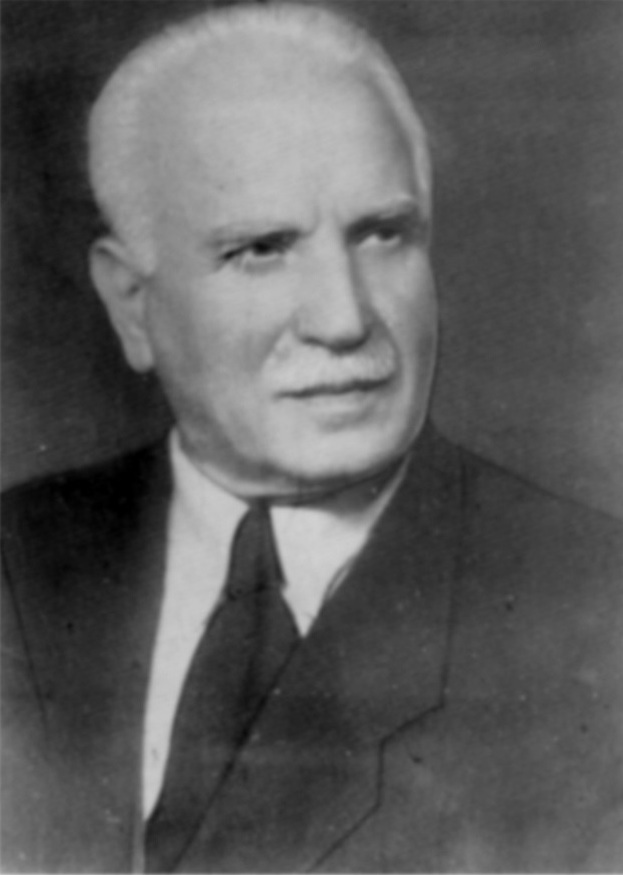
Arnold Chikobava – Head of the Mountain Caucasian Languages Department

==== History ====
In the field of history, the key issues were the old period of Georgia and the feudalism era, the origin and settlement of the Kartvelian tribes, the socio-economic and political history of Georgia, the relations between Georgia and the Caucasus, Georgia and the Middle East, etc. Scientific research was aimed at finding, processing and publishing Georgian and foreign sources.

In 1939, Ivane Javakhishvili and Nikoloz Berdzenishvili published a monographic study on the history of Georgia in the XIII-XVIII centuries, and the following year, a textbook on the history of Georgia was published by them and Simon Janashia.

==== Archaeology ====
In the field of archaeology, the leading place in the activities of the institute was held by conducting systematic archaeological excavations in different regions of Georgia, processing and publishing the extracted materials. Ivane Javakhishvili demanded to carry out the archaeological works according to the plan.

Archaeological expeditions were organized under the guidance of the scientists of the Institute: in Archiloskalo (1937), Kaspi (1937), Gebi (1938), Dablagomi (1936), Bolnisi (1936), Alazani Valley, near Safarlo (1937), village In Odishi (1937), in the Colchis Lowland, in the village of Didi Gantiadi, in Chkhorotsqu (1939), in Samshvilde (1939).

==== Ethnography ====
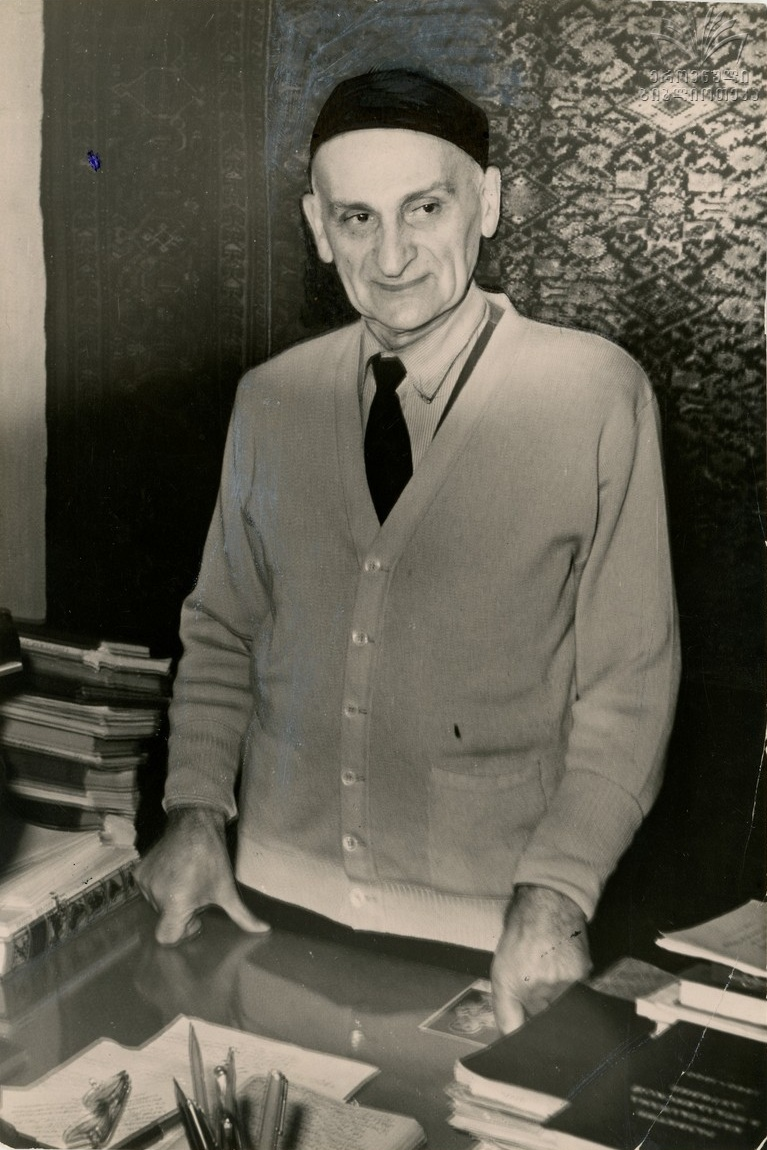
Giorgi Chitaia – Head of Ethnographic Department

In the field of ethnography, the activities of the Institute were given a systematic look at the field ethnographic works, processing and publication of the extracted materials. In 1937, under the leadership of Giorgi Chitaia, the ethnography department organized a complex expedition to Imereti, Baghdati district, Telavi district and Upper Svaneti. In 1939, ethnographic expeditions were organized in Racha, Tianeti, Pirikita Khevsureti, Kiziki, Pshavi, and little Liakhvi.

During the existence of the Institute of Language, History and Material Culture, Georgian ethnographers published monographs and ethnographic works: "Georgian Folk Ornament I: Khevsuruli", "Calendar of Svan Folk Days I: New Year Cycle", "Reminiscences of a Large Family in Svaneti" "Reminiscences of collective hunting in Racha", "Religious texts of the Georgian mountaineers of Eastern Georgia", etc. As a result of the activities of the institute, Georgian monuments of Georgian history and foreign sources of Georgian history were published.

On May 8, 1941, by the order of the Academy of Sciences of the Georgian SSR, Acad. N. Marr Institute of Language, History and Material Culture was divided into Institutes of Language and History. After splitting in two, until 1943 Simon Janashia was director of both institutes, and until 1947, until his death, he remained as director of the Institute of History.

== Institute of History during World War II ==
The Department of Philology was responsible for the scientific-critical study of Georgian and foreign historical sources and their preparation for publication. During the Second World War, "Life of Anaseuli Kartli" was published under the editorship of Simon Kaukhchishvili. Intensive work was being done in the department to translate and publish Persian sources about Georgia.

Archaeological excavations in Mtskheta-Armazi and western Georgia ceased in July 1941. Systematic archaeological works in Mtskheta-Armazi were resumed only in September 1943. Two years later excavations began in Colchis.

During the Second World War, the Department of Ethnography worked in three directions: to study the relics of the old economy and material culture of the Georgian tribes; Study of the relics of the old social relations of the Georgian tribes and study of the relics of the spiritual culture of the Georgian tribes. In 1943 a complex ethnographic expedition was organized in Khevsureti, the following year in Svaneti, Khevsureti, Guria and Gudamaqari, and in 1945 in Gudamakar-Khando and Upper Svaneti.

In 1943, the Institute of History, was named after Ivane Javakhishvili. In 1944–1945, departments of philosophy, Georgian musical folklore and history of Georgian folk medicine were opened at the Institute of History. In 1946, the Department of Philosophy was separated from the Institute and established as a separate institute.

== Institute of History and Ethnology ==
In 1977, the Institute of History, Archeology and Ethnography was separated from the Archaeological Department, which was established as an independent research center under the leadership of Otar Lordkipanidze.

In 2006 the institute was renamed the Ivane Javakhishvili Institute of History and Ethnology.

According to the data of 2021, the institute has five departments: History of Ancient Countries (headed by Levan Gordeziani), History and Medieval History of Georgia (headed by Mariam Chkhartishvili), New and Recent History (headed by Avtandil Songhulashvili), Ethnology of Georgia (headed by Ketevan Khucishvili) And Departments of Caucasian Ethnology (headed by Roland Topchishvili). The institute also includes an anthropological research laboratory.

== Scientific Research ==
=== Department of Archaeology ===
Well-known archaeologists: Andria Apakidze, Mikheil Ivashchenko, Germane Gobejishvili, Alexander Kalandadze, Giorgi Lomtatidze, Tariel Chubinishvili, Giorgi Tskitishvili and others worked in the archaeology department. In 1937, under the leadership of Ivane Javakhishvili and Nikoloz Berdzenishvili, the archaeological study of Mtskheta began, in 1947 - the city of Vani (under the leadership of N. Khoshtaria), 1948-1949 - Study of Ganjiskar ceramic enterprise and Rustavi town (led by Giorgi Lomtatidze), 1952 - Bichvinta town (led by Andria Apakidze), 1952 - Khovlegori and 1958 - Black Sea coast.

In 1959, the Department of Archaeology was separated from the Masonry and Bronze Age (headed by Germane Gobejishvili) and the Ancient Age (headed by Andria Apakidze). In 1965, the Department of Stone Age and Medieval Archaeology of Georgia was established at the institute. In 1972, the Department of Archaeological Monuments of Georgia was established, and the following year, the Department of Archaeology of the Early and Middle Bronze Age, the Department of Archaeology of the Late Bronze Age, and the Paleo-Urban Research Laboratory were established.

In 1977, the Archaeological Research Center was established as an independent research center. Expeditions of the Old Stone Age Georgian Archaeology Department were organized in the mountains of southern Georgia, Tskaltsitela valley, Kodori valley and Terjola district. Studies on the problems of the Stone Age have been published by: Guram Grigolia, Medea Nioradze, L. Nebieridze, Luiza Tsereteli and others.

Since 1969, field archaeological research of the Department of Ancient Archaeology has been carried out in Mtskheta, Bichvinta, Borjomi Gorge, Vani, etc. The Department of Ancient Archaeology compiled collections: "Mtskheta" (six volumes) and "Great Pitiunti" (three volumes). Monographs were published by Andria Apakidze, Guram Lordkipanidze, Giorgi Dundua and others.

=== Department of Ethnology ===
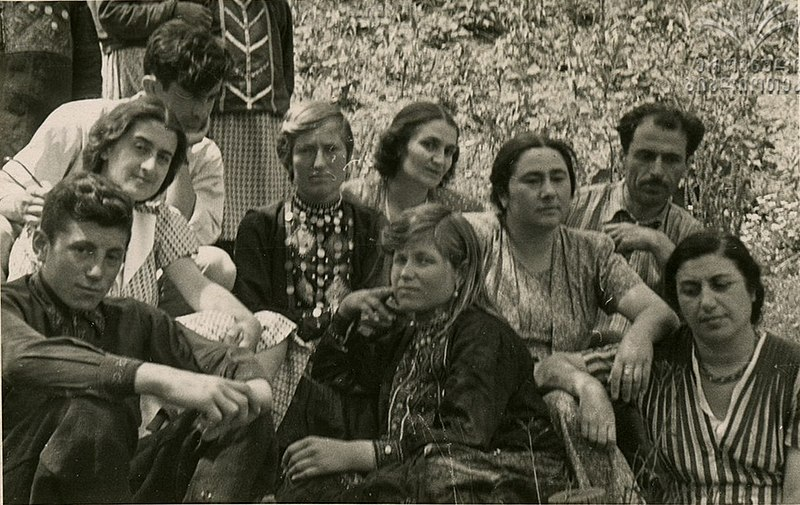
Julieta Rukhadze in archaeological expedition, khevsureti

In the ethnography department of the Institute of History and Ethnology, research was conducted in different directions. Giorgi Chitaia actively studied the issues of material culture and agricultural life, who published several researches on Georgian plowing tools and farming systems, including: "Rachuli plowing", "Ksnuri mountain plow" and others.

Neli Bregadze ("Mountain Farming in Georgia"), Julieta Rukhadze ("Folk Agriculture in Western Georgia"), Mikheil Gegeshidze ("Irrigation Farming in Georgia") worked on issues of agriculture, terrace farming, soil science and agro-ethnography. Viticulture and winemaking issues were studied by Levan Pruidze ("Viticulture and Enology in Georgia, I, Racha"), a. Lekiashvili, L. Gabunia and others.

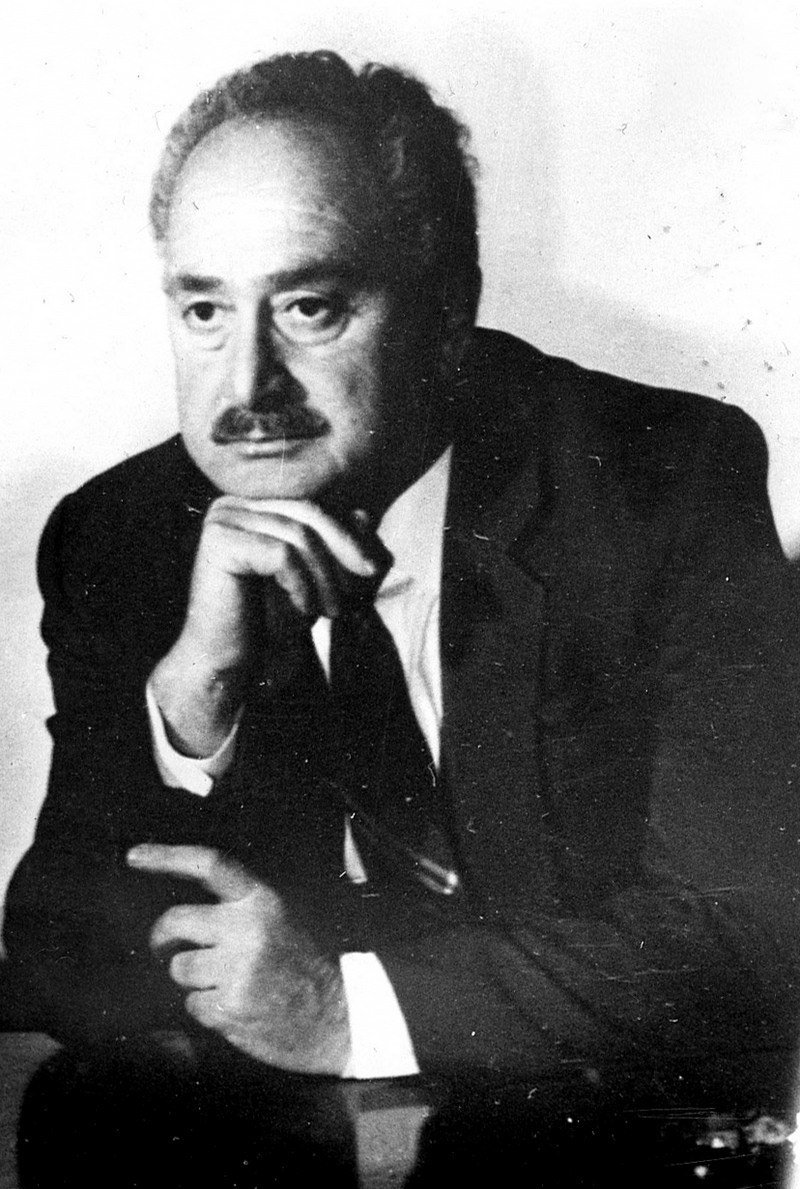
Malkhaz Abdushelishvili – One of the founders of the Georgian Anthropological School

Giorgi Chitaia laid the foundation for the study of residential and agricultural buildings and types of settlements based on ethnographic data. Residential buildings in different parts of Georgia were studied by Tinatin Ochiauri, Valerian Itonishvili ("Residential buildings in the valley in the past and now"), Julieta Rukhadze and others. The staff of the institute also studied the mills spread in Georgia (S. Bedukadze), folk transport (Mikheil Gegeshidze), Georgian ceramic (Luba Bochorishvili) and metallurgy, wooden utensils and others. From 1962 to 1968, members of the ethnography department studied cult monuments in the mountains of eastern Georgia.

From 1945 to 1953, the Department of Musical Folklore operated at the institute. Since the 1960s, work has focused on musical ethnography. The staff of the department studied Georgian songs and instruments in the historical-ethnographic aspect (Nanuli Maisuradze, Manana Shilakadze).

In 1964, the sector of Anthropology was established in the Ethnography Department, where mainly ethnogenesis and the history of the formation of races were studied. Anthropo-somatological issues of the population of Georgia and the Caucasus were also studied in the anthropology sector. In order to obtain paleoanthropological materials, anthropologists often participated in archaeological expeditions. Dermatoglyphic and odontological expeditions began in 1968.

In 1985, the study of ethnic processes foundation were laid by N. Abesadze. Roland Topchishvili worked on the issues of population migration on the territory of Georgia. Wedding customs from different parts of Georgia were studied by Valerian Itonishvili, Rusudan Kharadze, Liana Melikishvili and others.

== Structure ==
=== Historical and ethnographic archive ===
After the changes in the institute in 2006, a special structural unit was created: the historical and ethnographic archive. The material preserved in the departments of the institute was collected in the archive. Together with the archival fund of expeditions, the institute preserves:

==== Personal Archival Fund ====
The personal archives of the institute's staff are preserved in the personal archival fund, including the personal funds of Nanuli Abesadze, Vera Bardavelidze, Luba Bochorishvili, Mikheil Gegeshidze, Giorgi Lomtatidze, Alexi Ochiauri, Tinatin Ochiauri and others.

==== Graphic Material Fund ====
Measurements, sketches of Georgian and Caucasian cultural heritage monuments, religious, residential, defense and agricultural buildings are protected in the graphic material fund. The materials were made in the 1930s and 1980s.

==== Music Foundation ====
The foundation combines songs recorded by Sergi Zhgenti, Tamar Mamaladze, Shalva Aslanishvili and an unknown recorder in different parts of Georgia. In 2005, with the support of the Ministry of Culture, Monument Protection and Sports of Georgia and the Vienna Phonogram Archive, the music fund material was fully transferred to digital trains.

==== Publications ====
"Kronos" is annual, multi-profile, peer-reviewed scientific journal which publishes original works on history, ethnology, physical anthropology, archaeology and art history. The first issue of the magazine was published in 2020.

The collections of the Institute of History and Ethnology are: "Georgian Source Studies", "Issues of New and Recent History", "Caucasus Ethnological Collection", "Issues of Medieval History of Georgia", "Historical-Ethnological Research", "Proceedings of the Institute of History and Ethnology" and "Caucasian-Near Eastern Collection".

==== Directors ====
- Simon Janashia (1936-1947)
- Nikoloz Berdzenishvili (1947-1965)
- Giorgi Melikishvili (1965-1999)
- David Muskhelishvili (1999-2006)
- Vazha Kiknadze (2006-2018)
- Giorgi Cheishvili (2018–present)

== Bibliography ==
- Topuridze, Q. Miqeladze, T. Itonishvili, V. Zhordania, O. (1988). Iv. Javakhishvili Institute of History, Archaeology and Ethnography. Tbilisi. ISBN 5-520-00575-3.
- Kiknadze, R. (1984). Source Studies At the Iv. Javakhishvili Institute of History, Archeology and Ethnography. Tbilisi: Science. ISSN 0132-6058. pp. 157–168.
- Lortqipanidze, O. (1976). Archaeology at the Ivane Javakhishvili institute. Ciskari. N8. Tbilisi: Literary-artistic and socio-political magazine. ISSN 0132-6023. pp. 127–134.
- Odisheli, J. (1971). Iv. Javakhishvili Institute of History, Archeology and Ethnography in 1970. Tbilisi: Science. pp. 149–158.
- Janashia, S. (1944). short report of Nicolai Marr Institute of Language, History and Material Culture, 1936-1941. Tbilisi: Publishing House of the Academy of Sciences of the Georgian SSR. pp. 375–397.
