= Giorgi Dekanozishvili =

George Dekanozishvili
- გიორგი დეკანოზიშვილი
- Born: 1868; Mahachkala, Dagestan, Russian Empire
- Died: 19 November 1910 (aged 41–42); Cannes, France
- Occupation: Politician
- Political party: Georgian Socialist-Federalist Revolutionary Party

Giorgi Gabrielis dze Dekanozishvili (Georgian: გიორგი გაბრიელის ძე დეკანოზიშვილი; 1868–19 November 1910) was a Georgian political and public figure, publicist, and one of the founders of the Georgian Socialist-Federalist Revolutionary Party.

== Biography ==
He graduated from the Tbilisi Real School in 1887 and the St. Petersburg Mining Institute in 1892. In 1890, he founded the Union of Georgian and Armenian Students in St. Petersburg, which soon disbanded. From 1889 to 1892 he was the leader of the Georgian student circle in St. Petersburg and an active figure in the student political movement of the higher education institutions of the Russian Empire. In 1892, with the participation of Dekanozishvili, the political organization of Georgian students of the Russian Empire - the "Liberty League" - was founded in Kutaisi.

Dekanozishvili actively cooperated with the Georgian press, writing about Georgia's national politics, manganese production and its importance for Georgia. In 1896-1900 his letters were published in the newspaper Iveria, and in 1900 in Tbilisi the first group of Georgian Social-Federalists led by Dekanozishvili published the newspaper Tsnobis Furtseli. From 1900, Dekanozishvili was a member of the board of the Georgian Literacy Society. In 1901, George Dekanozishvili, together with Archil Jorjadze, Tedo Sakhokia, Kita Abashidze, Andria Dekanozishvili, Giorgi Laskhishvili and others, founded the Georgian Socialist-Federalist Revolutionary Party. Dekanozishvili was elected a member of the Central Committee of the party. In 1901, under his leadership, a periodical of the party was founded in Paris - the newspaper Sakartvelo, which was published together with the French version (La Géorgie) until the end of 1905.

== Bibliography ==
- ურუშაძე ლ., ენციკლოპედია „საქართველო“, ტ. 2, თბ., 2012. — გვ. 360.
- სახოკია თ., ჩემი საუკუნის ადამიანები, თბ., 1969;
- ტუღუში მ., გიორგი დეკანოზიშვილი (ცხოვრება და მოქმედება). – ჟურნ. «კავკასიონი», X, პარიზი, 1965;
- ურუშაძე ლ., გიორგი დეკანოზიშვილის პოლიტიკური ბიოგრაფიისათვის („საქართველოს თავისუფლების ლიგა“ და „ქართველ სოციალ-ფედერალისტთა პარტია“ – 1890–1906), «საისტორიო ვერტიკალები», 2007, No.13;
