= Institute of History and Ethnology =

Institute of History and Ethnology:

- Abbasgulu Bakikhanov Institute of History and Ethnology in Azerbaijan
- Ivane Javakhishvili Institute of History and Ethnology in Georgia
- Sh. Sh. Ualikhanov Institute of History and Ethnology in Kazakhstan
