= Ilya Pavlovich Petrushevsky =

Russian-Soviet orientalist (1898–1977)

- Born: 10 June 1898; Kiev, Russian Empire
- Died: 18 March 1977 (aged 78); Leningrad, Soviet Union
- Education: National University of Kharkiv
- Occupation: Historian

Ilya Pavlovich Petrushevsky (Russian: Илья́ Па́влович Петруше́вский; 10 [22] June 1898 – 18 March 1977) was a Soviet Orientalist and historian.

== Biography ==
In 1926 Petrushevsky graduated from the Faculty of History and Philology of Kharkiv and Baku Universities. From 1926 to 1931 he worked in Baku. In 1931, under the leadership of P. K. Zhoze and Yu. N. Marr, he studied Arabic and Persian languages at the Institute of the Caucasus Studies of the USSR Academy of Sciences in Tbilisi. From 1933 to 1936 he taught at the University of Tbilisi where he completed his Candidate of Historical Sciences in 1935. From 1936 to 1941, he worked at the Leningrad branch of the Institute of History of the Academy of Sciences of the USSR, and taught at the regional pedagogical institute. For his Doctor of Historical Sciences (1941), he wrote his doctoral dissertation, "Essays on the history of feudal relations in Azerbaijan and Armenia in the 16th to early 19th century." During the Great Patriotic War, he taught in Baku and Tashkent. From 1945 to 1947 he worked at the Leningrad branch of the Institute of Oriental Studies of the USSR Academy of Sciences and became a Professor at Leningrad University in 1947. From 1950 to 1954 and 1961 to 1977 he headed the Department of History of the Middle East countries of the Eastern Faculty. From 1956 to 1959 he led the Iranian Group of the Leningrad branch of the Institute of Oriental Studies of the Academy of Sciences of the USSR (from November 1957 it was renamed the Iranian Cabinet).

Petrushevsky's main areas of scientific interest included the history of agriculture and feudal relations in the Near and Middle East, the history of popular movements in medieval Iran, relations between nomadic and sedentary populations, and the history of Islam. The works of I. P. Petrushevsky are in demand in the world of Orientalism, some of them have been translated into Persian and English. In total, he published more than 90 works.

Petrushevsky died in 1977 and was buried at Serafimovskoe Cemetery in Leningrad.

== Works ==
- The Cambridge History of Iran
- Islam in Iran in the VII — XV centuries
