= Nikoloz Janashia =

Georgian historian (1931–1982)

Nikoloz (Lasha) Janashia

Nikoloz (Lasha) Janashia (Georgian: ნიკოლოზ (ლაშა) ჯანაშია; November 18, 1931 in Tbilisi – September 7, 1982 in Tbilisi) was a famous Georgian historian and public benefactor.

Janashia born in Tbilisi, son of a noted Georgian historian Simon Janashia (1900–1947).

In 1954, Janashia graduated from the faculty of history of the Tbilisi State University.

He began as a research fellow at the Institute of History and Ethnology of the Georgian Academy of Sciences (GAS) in 1957. After he received his PhD in history in 1962, he came a senior research fellow at GAS, and from 1970 to 1982, he served as a deputy director of its Institute of Manuscripts. He was also hired as an associate professor at Tbilisi State University in 1965, a position he maintained until his death.

Janashia also served as a scientific secretary of the Historical Society of Georgia, a member of the Commission of the source studies of the history of Georgia of the Presidium of GAS.

The main fields of Janashia's research were the history of Georgia of the 4th-5th centuries, and Georgian and Armenian sources of the history of Georgia.

== Bibliography ==
- The data of Lazar Pharpetsi about Georgia, Tbilisi, 1963, 120 pp (in Georgian)
- Kartli in the 4th century - Essays on Georgian History, Vol. II, Tbilisi, 1973, pp. 57–77 (in Georgian)
- The Martyrdom of Queen Shushaniki, Part I, Tbilisi, 1980 (in Georgian, English summary)
- Essays on Source Studies, Tbilisi, 1986, 350 pp (in Georgian)

== See also ==
- List of Georgians
- List of historians
