= Liberty League (disambiguation) =

The Liberty League is an American NCAA Division III intercollegiate athletic conference.

Liberty League may also refer to:

Politics

- American Liberty League, an organization of anti-New Deal Democrats, formed in 1934
- Lithuanian Liberty League, a dissident organization in the Lithuanian S.S.R., formed in 1978
- Liberty League (Georgia), a national liberation organization in the country of Georgia, 1892–1896
- Liberty League (Historic), a British classical liberal organization, 1920–21
- The Liberty League, a UK student organization in the 2010s affiliated with the Adam Smith Institute

Sports

- Liberty League (California), a high-school athletic conference in Los Angeles County, California, U.S.
