= Tbilisi Open Air Museum of Ethnography =

Museum in the country of Georgia

Coordinates: 41.702°N 44.743°E

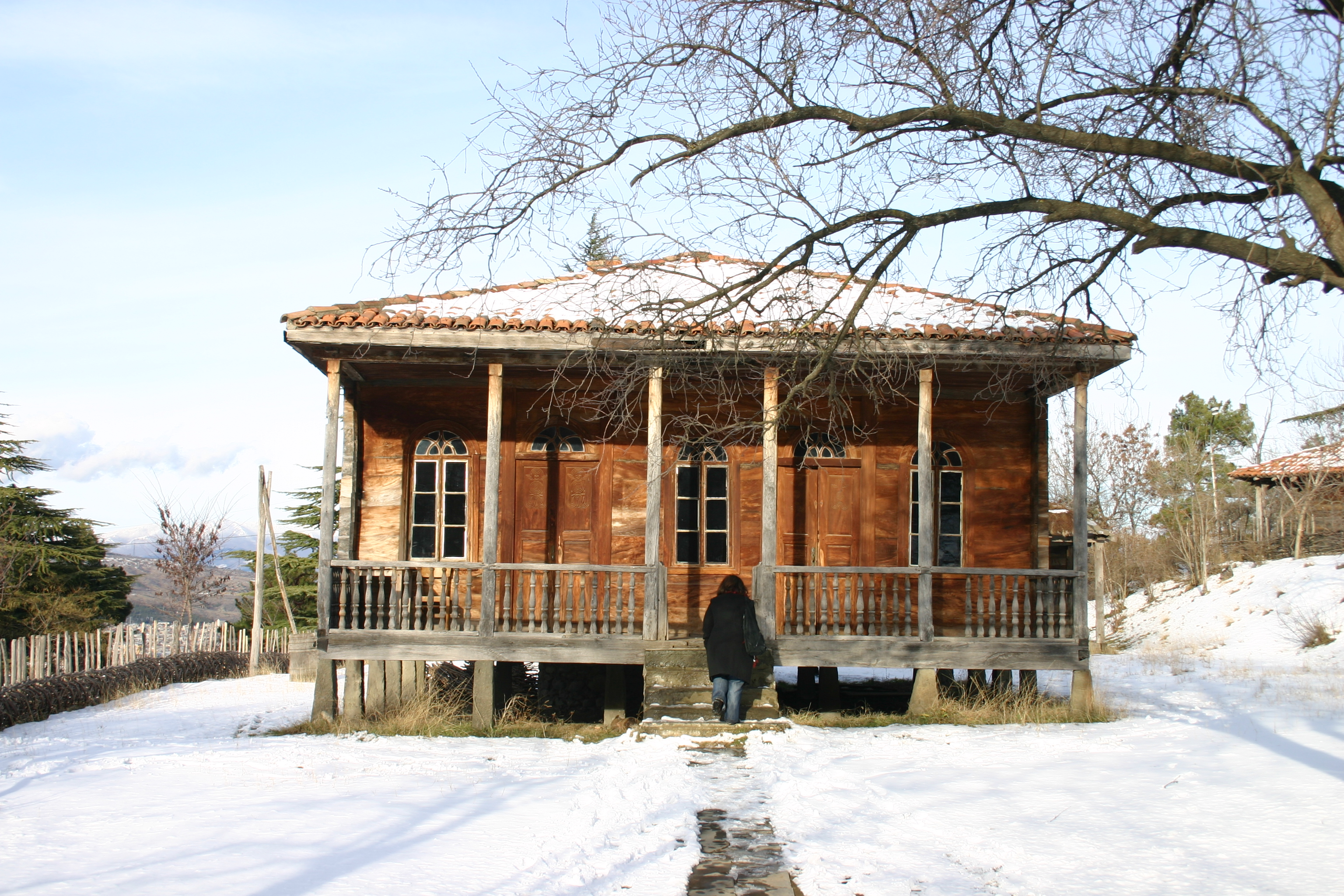
A life-size model of a traditional Georgian house displayed at the Open Air Museum

The Giorgi Chitaia Open Air Museum of Ethnography (Georgian: გიორგი ჩიტაიას სახელობის ეთნოგრაფიული მუზეუმი ღია ცის ქვეშ, giorgi chit’aias sakhelobis etnograpiuli muzeumi ghia tsis kvesh) is an open-air museum in Tbilisi, Georgia, displaying the examples of folk architecture and craftwork from various regions of the country. The museum is named after Giorgi Chitaia, a Georgian ethnographer, who founded the museum on April 27, 1966. Since December 30, 2004, it has been administered as part of the Georgian National Museum.

== Overview ==
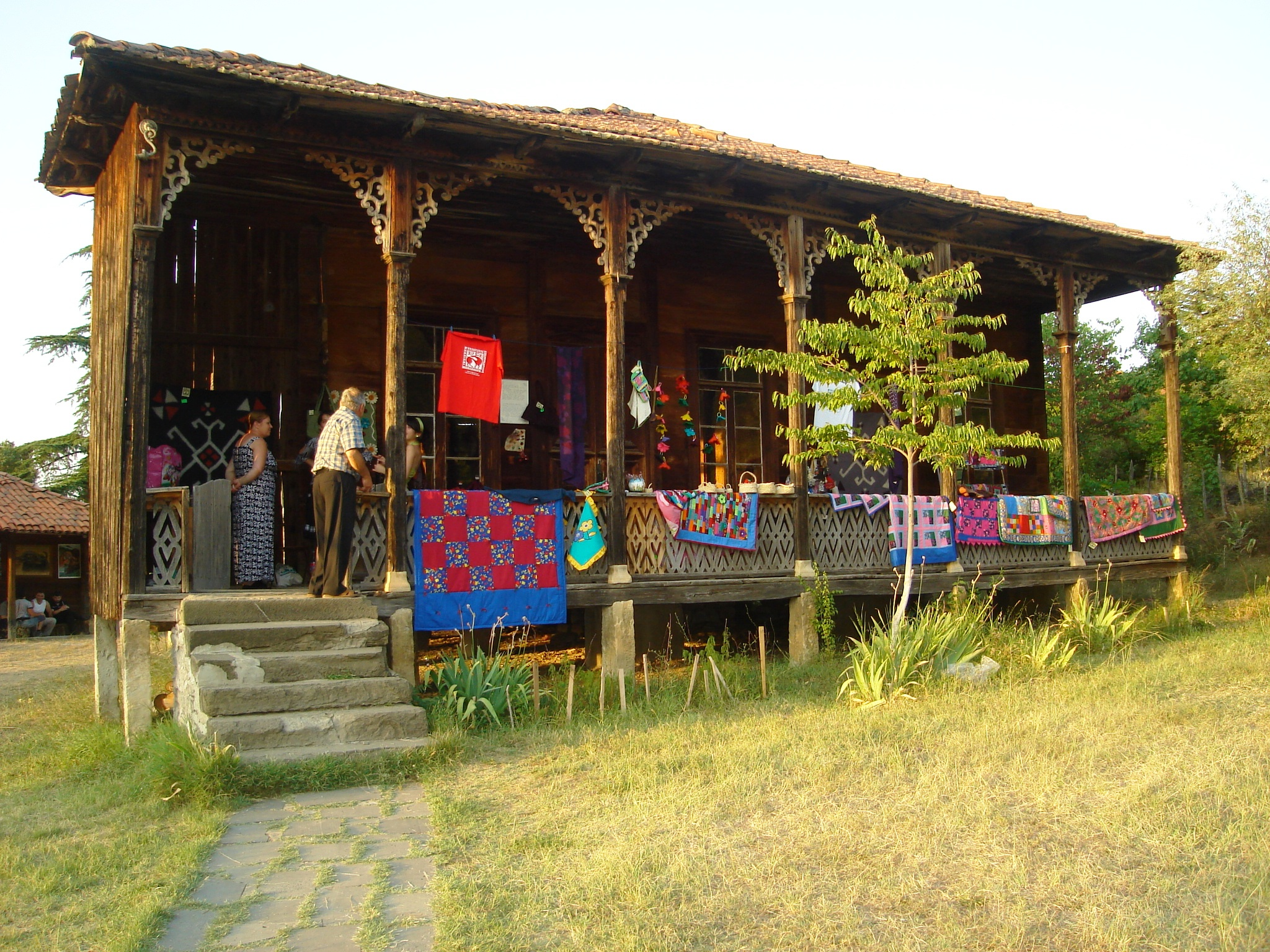
Tbilisi Open Air Museum

The museum is located west to Turtle Lake on a hill overlooking the Vake district, Tbilisi. It is essentially a historic village populated by buildings moved there from all main territorial subdivisions of Georgia. The museum occupies 52 hectares of land and is arranged in eleven zones, displaying around 70 buildings and more than 8,000 items. The exhibition features the traditional darbazi-type and fiat-roofed stone houses from eastern Georgia, openwork wooden houses with gable roofs of straw or boards from western Georgia, watchtowers from the mountainous provinces of Khevsureti, Pshavi, and Svaneti, Megrelian and Imeretian wattle maize storages, Kakhetian wineries (marani), and Kartlian water mills as well as a collection of traditional household articles such as distaffs, knitting-frames, chums, clothes, carpets, pottery and furniture. There are also an early Christian "Sioni" basilica from Tianeti and a 6th-7th century familial burial vault with sarcophagus.

Since 2004, the museum has been hosting an annual summertime folk culture festival Art-Gene founded and managed by the Georgian rock musician and folk enthusiast Zaza Korinteli ("Zumba").

== See also ==
- Georgian National Museum
- Art Museum of Georgia
