= Liberty League (Georgia) =

First Georgian national liberation organization, active in 1892–1896 years in Russian Empire.

The league was established in Kutaisi June 26–29 of 1892 by Georgian students from Russian and European universities. Most of its founders were from Universities of Warsaw, Kiev, St. Petersburg, Moscow, Kharkiv, Odessa.

Many of the league's founders became prominent politicians, like George Gvazava, George Dekanozishvili, Archil Jorjadze, Tedo Sakhokia, Jacob Pantskhava, Niko Jakeli, Mikhail Kheltuplishvili, Vakhtang Ghambashidze, Ivan Eliashvili.

Out of the league emerged two leading historic Georgian parties – Social-Federalists in 1904 and National Democrats in 1917.

Among actively supporters of the league were well-known public figures of the Sixtiers generation – writers Cyril Lordkipanidze, David Mikeladze (one of the sessions of the league's founding was held in his apartment), educator Silovan Khundadze and others.

Most of the league's members were arrested by Tsarist gendarmes in the spring of 1893. Persecutions took place till 1896.
