= Zaza Korinteli =

Georgia musician

Zumba
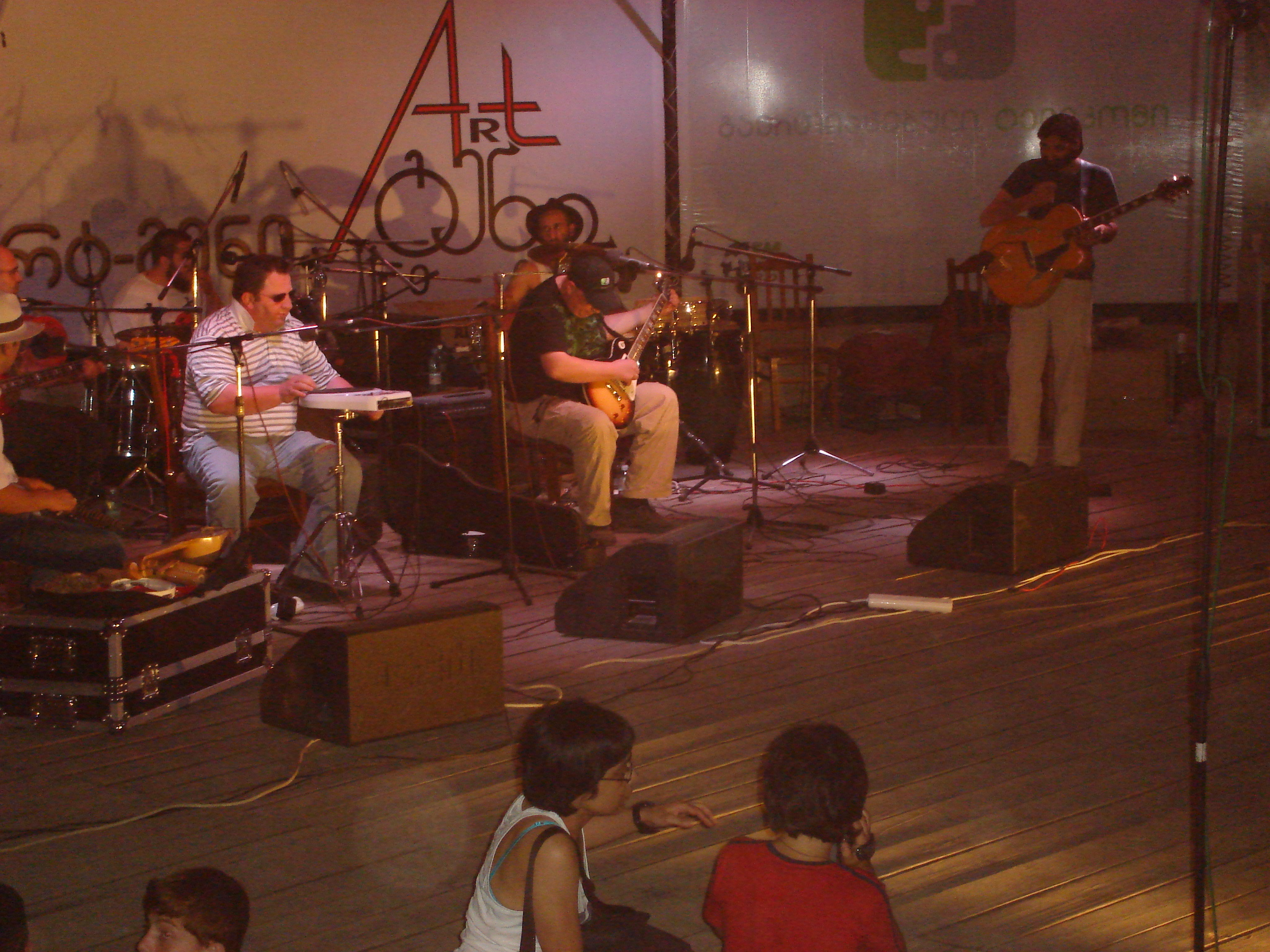
- ZumbaLand at the Art-Gene festival in Tbilisi 2008

Background information
- Born: Zaza Korinteli; 29 December 1973 (age 52)
- Genres: Georgian folk tradition, rock, reggae
- Occupations: Musician, folklorist
- Instruments: Vocals, bass, percussion, guitar
- Members: ZumbaLand
- Website: www.zazakorinteli.com

Zaza Korinteli (Georgian: ზაზა კორინთელი) (born 29 December 1973), better known by his stage name Zumba, is a Georgian rock musician, folklorist and civil activist. His music fuses a wide variety of genres, principally Georgian folk tradition, rock, and reggae. A multi-instrumentalist who plays guitar, bass, wind instruments, percussion, and a vocalist, he leads the band ZumbaLand and collaborates on several other musical projects. His stage name is an acronym of the Georgian phrase zogjer ubralod moindome, bolos agisruldeba (ზოგჯერ უბრალოდ მოინდომე ბოლოს აგისრულდება), which translates as "Just wish sometimes – it will eventually come true."

== Biography ==
Born in Tbilisi, Korinteli graduated from the Department of Psychology at Tbilisi State University and later studied at the Kraków Academy of Modern Music and Jazz (1997–2000). He founded his first band, ZumbaLand, in 1993. The group initially performed in the streets, parks and metro stations of Tbilisi and recorded its debut album "I Am Waiting for the Sunrise" in 1995. It went on to win two nationwide rock music festivals in 1996.

In 1997, Korinteli disbanded the group and moved to Kraków, Poland, where the band was reincarnated with Georgian, Polish, Ukrainian, and American musicians. This line-up toured Poland at the end of the 1990s and recorded the album "Project Union" in 2000. The same year, Korinteli returned to Georgia and assembled a new band, which has maintained a stable lineup since then. The band has recorded three studio albums: "Euroremonti" (2002), "Jolo" (2004) and "Adila" (2006). It has staged nationwide tours and performed at various festivals and concerts in Georgia, Ukraine, and Russia, including jamming with the American jazz musicians Alfred "Pee Wee" Ellis and Richard Bona.

He has composed soundtracks for the films "Travelling in Folklore", "Adila", and "Everything Will Be All Right". His theater credits include music for "New Year's Tale" (Poland) and "People from Yesterday" (Liberty Theatre).

In 2003, he founded the annual summertime folk culture festival Art-Gene, hosted by the Open Air Museum of Ethnography in Tbilisi. The festival also tours across Georgia, popularizing traditional culture and collecting lesser-known examples from the countryside. He is often called the Ambassador of Georgian Culture.

In 2007 Zaza Korinteli's song "Hello, Abkhazia" won the national competition "Patrinote".

In 2009, Korinteli recorded the album "AstroGeorgia", a world music project (sometimes referred to as "World Music from Georgia"). The project's first tour took place in the Baltic countries (Estonia, Latvia, and Lithuania). He has also performed at the Art-Gene Festival in Georgia and the Black Sea Jazz Festival, where he shared the stage with musicians such as Hugh Masekela, Mike Stern, Dave Weckl, Randy Brecker, Chris Minh Doky, and Roy Hargrove.

In 2009, he founded the non-profit organization Tsami, which aims to develop both traditional and modern culture and art.

Korinteli founded the World Music Festival in Mestia. His band ZumbaLand performed at the festival in August 2010.

Zaza Korinteli was the main organizer of the "5 Star October" event in Batumi.

In 2012, in recognition of his significant contribution to Georgian culture, he was awarded the Presidential Order of Excellence by President Mikheil Saakashvili.

Zaza Korinteli is also a member of the jazz, funk, and fusion group ReroRera, which performs in the San Francisco Bay Area.

== Albums ==
- MultiTest (2011, Lithuania)
- AstroGeorgia (2010)
- Adila (2006)
- Mgzavruli (2005)
- Jolo / Raspberry (2004)
- EuroRemont (2002)
- Project Union (2000, Poland)
- I'm Waiting for the Sunrise (1995)
