= Malkhaz Abdushelishvili =

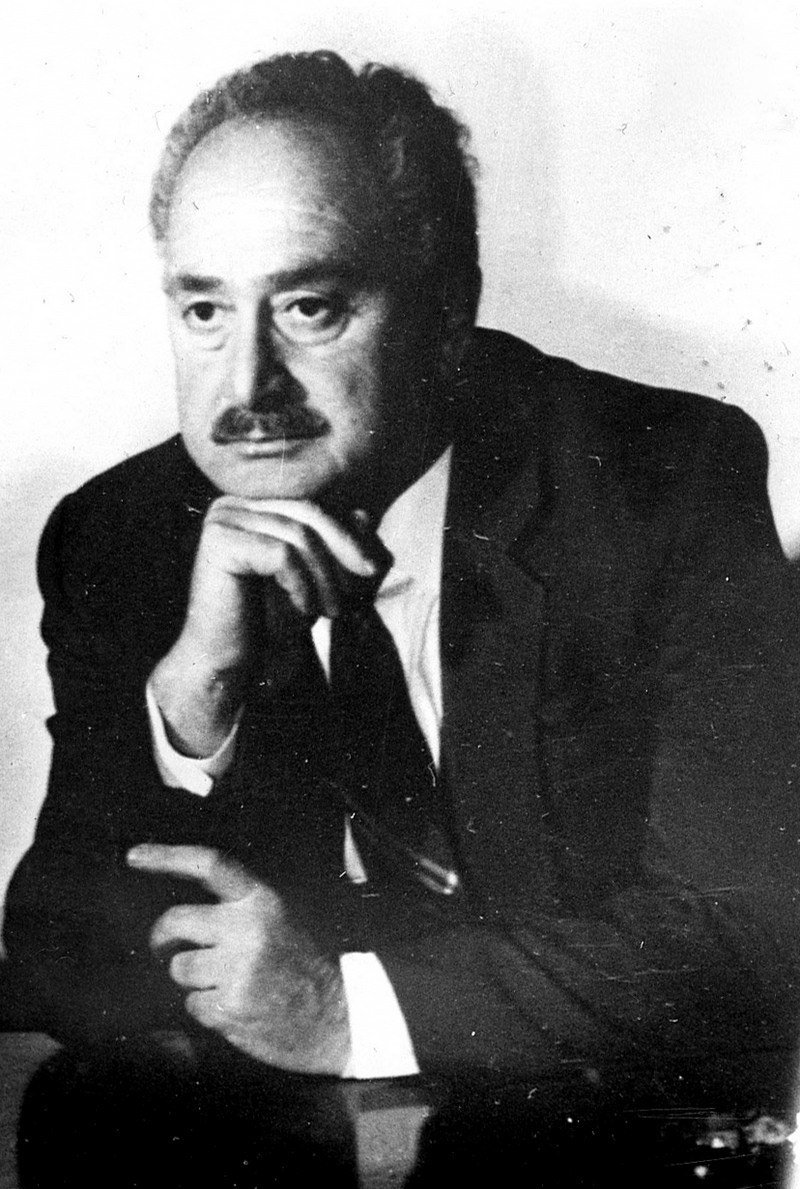
Photo of Malkhaz Abdushelishvili

Malkhaz Grigorʹevich Abdushelishvili (Georgian: მალხაზ აბდუშელიშვილი; February 28, 1926 – February 23, 1998) was a famous Soviet and Georgian scientist, one of the founders of the Georgian scientific school of Anthropology, Academician of the Georgian Academy of Sciences (GAS), Meritorious Scholar of Georgia, Doctor of Historical Sciences, Professor.

He was born in 1926, in Tbilisi. In 1948 he graduated from the Tbilisi State Medical University. He received a PhD degree in 1952, and in 1964 a degree of the Doctor of Historical Sciences.

Between 1948 and 1998 Abdushelishvili was a research fellow (1948–1952), senior research fellow (1952–1959), and head of the Department of Anthropology of the Institute of History and Ethnology of the Georgian Academy of Sciences (GAS).

From 1964 to 1998, Abdushelishvili was a professor of the Tbilisi State University (TSU).

In 1993 he was elected as academician of the Georgian Academy of Sciences.

Main fields of scientific activity of Professor Abdushelishvili were: anthropology of the population of Georgia and the Caucasus, anthropology of the population of India, kranology of the population of the Caucasus, etc. He was author about 200 scientific-research works and more than 10 monographs.

He was a chief expert of UNESCO in anthropology (1964–1998), an honorary member of the European Anthropological Association (1973), and honorary member of the Indian Society of Human Genetics (1975).

Abdushelishvili died in Tbilisi in 1998 (aged 71).

The award-winning popular science book on human evolution Who Asked the First Question? Origins of Human Choral Singing, Intelligence, Language and Speech (2006) is dedicated to the memory of Abdushelishvili and his lifelong friend, Russian anthropologist Valery Alekseyev.

== Select bibliography ==
- "Anthropology of the population of old and modern Georgia" (a monograph), Tbilisi, 1964 (in Russian)
- "Kranology of the population of the old and modern Caucasus" (a monograph), Tbilisi, 1966 (in Russian)
- "The genesis of the aboriginal population of the Caucasus in the light of Anthropological data" (a monograph), Tokyo, 1968 (in English)
- "New data of Anthropology of Northern India" (a monograph), Moscow, 1980 (in Russian, English summary)
- "New material about the Anthropology of Western India" (a monograph), Moscow, 1982 (in Russian, English summary)
- "Paleostomatology of Georgia" (a monograph), Tbilisi, 1989 (Co-author M. Inashvili. In Georgian, English summary)
- "Methodics of anthropological investigations" (a monograph), Tbilisi, 1992 (in Russian, English summary)
