= Mariam Jambakur-Orbeliani =

Georgian aristocrat and feminist (1852–1941)

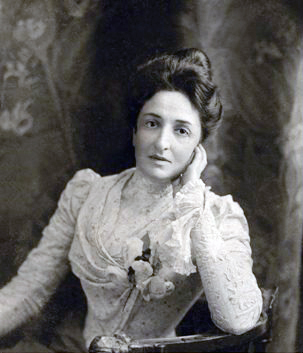
Mariam Jambakur-Orbeliani.

Princess Mariam Jambakur-Orbeliani (Georgian: მარიამ ჯამბაკურ-ორბელიანი; 1852–1941) was a Georgian noblewoman, philanthropist, educator, public figure and feminist.

== Background ==
Princess Mariam Orbeliani was the daughter of a Georgian poet General, Prince Vakhtang Orbeliani and Ekaterina. Mariam had a brother, Prince Nikolai Orbeliani, who was a jurist. In 1870 Mariam completed her studies at Tbilisi Women's Courses and was elected to the School of Nobility Careteker Society.

== Social activism ==
In 1879 Orbeliani became a founding member of the Society for the Promotion of Literacy among Georgians. For 33 years, she also led the Society of Women Teachers, focus of which was on protecting the rights of female teachers and hiring of women into educational institutions. Additionally, Orbeliani raised money to open the first Georgian Women's School in the country and was part of the Tbilisi Childcare Society.

In 1894 Orbeliani published the full collection of poems written by her father, who had died four years earlier Orbeliani was an active participant in the movement to establish the Tbilisi State University (TSU) in 1918. The Georgian National Center of Manuscripts maintains an archive dedicated to Orberliani, which contains 1123 units of material concerning her biography and social activities, creative works and correspondence.

== Later years ==
Following the Red Army invasion and Georgia's subsequent forced absorption into the Soviet Union in 1921, Mariam continued pedagogical and translation work but was reportedly marginalized and gradually removed from social activism. She died in 1941 at the age of 89.
