= Bachana =

Bachana could refer to:

- Bachaana, 2016 Pakistani romantic thriller film
- Bachana (song), 2009 song by Bilal Khan
- Bachana (given name), masculine given name
