= Giorgi Akhvlediani =

Georgian linguist (1887–1973)

- Born: 13 April 1887; Derchi, Tsqaltubo Municipality, Russian Empire
- Died: 7 July 1973 (aged 86); Tbilisi, Georgian SSR, Soviet Union
- Citizenship: Russian Empire; Democratic Republic of Georgia; Soviet Union
- Education: Kharkov University; Petrograd University
- Scientific career
- Fields: Linguistics

Giorgi Akhvlediani (Georgian: გიორგი ახვლედიანი; April 13, 1887 – July 7, 1973) was a Georgian linguist whow was member of the Georgian Academy of Sciences (1941) and a corresponding member of Academy of Sciences of the Soviet Union from 1939. He was one of the founders of the Tbilisi State University (1918). Honored Scientist of the Georgian SSR (1943). A member of the International Society of Experimental Phonetics (1932) and Linguistic Society of America (1940). A member of the Communist Party of the Soviet Union from 1942.

== Biography ==
Akhvlediani was born on 13 April 1887 in the village of Derchi of Tsqaltubo Municipality. In 1910 he was enrolled at the historical-philological faculty of Kharkov University, where he received fundamental education in Indo-European linguistics and classical philology. In 1915 Akhvlediani continued his studies at the chair of comparative Indo-European linguistics of Kharkov University, preparing for professorship. Soon he was sent to Petrograd University where he attended the lectures of such prominent scholars as Nikolai Marr, Carl Salemann, Fyodor Shcherbatskoy, Lev Shcherba and others.

At the newly founded Tbilisi University Akhvlediani pioneered the teaching of such disciplines as general linguistics and phonetics. As a scholar of wide education Akhvlediani lectured in diverse fields of linguistics, namely, introductory and general courses of linguistics, history of linguistic theories, general phonetics, Sanskrit, Greek, history and dialectology of the Russian language, and comparative grammar of Indo-European languages. Akhvlediani was decorated with the Order of Lenin, the Order of the Red Banner of Labour, the Badge of Honour, the Order of the October Revolution and with medals.
