= Tedo Zhordania =

Georgian historian, philologist and educator

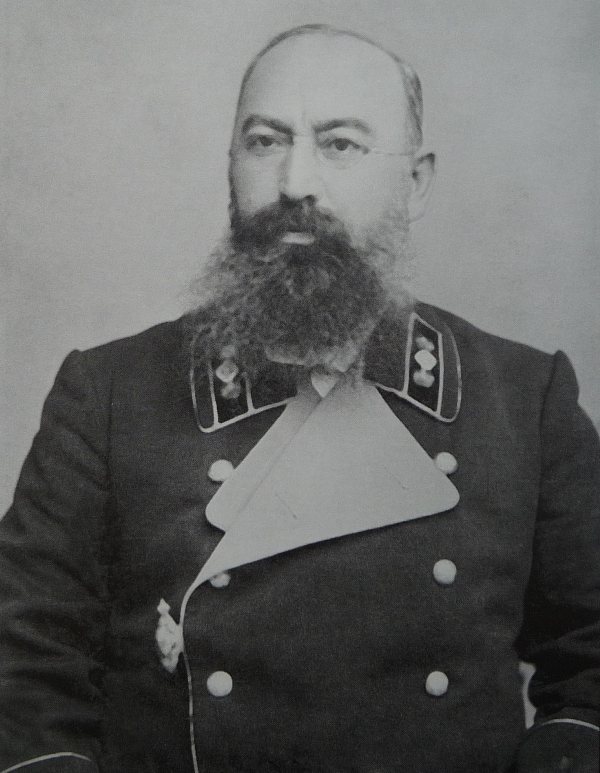
Tedo Zhordania

Tedo Zhordania (Georgian: თედო ჟორდანია; 10 April 1854 – 22 October 1916) was a Georgian historian, philologist, and educator.

Born in an Orthodox priest's family in the village of Mokvi, then part of the Russian Empire, Zhordania studied theology in Kutaisi, Tbilisi, and Moscow. The leading Russian historian of that period, Vasily Klyuchevsky, recommended the young Georgian student to pursue his career in Moscow, but Zhordania returned to Tbilisi, where he taught geography at a theological college and supervised church schools. An amateur historian, Zhordania revealed, studied, and published a number of hitherto unknown historical records. Many of these sources were subsequently lost and are known to us exclusively from Zhordania's publications. He died in Kaspi. He was subsequently buried at the Didube Pantheon in Tbilisi.
