= Giorgi Chubinashvili =

Georgian art historian

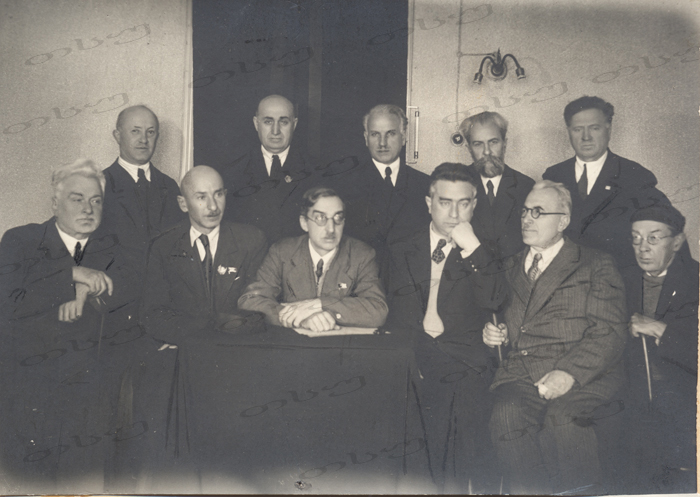
Chubinashvili - second from the right in the second row

Giorgi Chubinashvili (Georgian: გიორგი ჩუბინაშვილი Георгий Николаевич Чубинашвили; November 21, 1885 – January 14, 1973) was a Georgian art historian.

Born in St. Petersburg, Russian Empire he studied psychology at the universities of Leipzig and Halle (1907–12), and Georgian-Armenian-Persian philology at the Petrograd University (1916–17).

Returning to Georgia, he served as a professor at the Tbilisi State University (1918–31, 1937–48). He was one of the founding fathers and the first rector of Tbilisi State Academy of Arts (former Fine Arts (1922–28). From 1941 until his death, he directed the Institute of the History of Georgian Arts at the Georgian Academy of Sciences (now the National Centre for Georgian Art History and Heritage Preservation) which has been named after him. His works are chiefly focused on medieval Georgian and Armenian architecture, as well as on wall painting and sculpture.
