= Bachana (given name) =

Bachana (Georgian: ბაჩანა) is a masculine given name. Notable people with the name include:

- Bachana Akhalaia, Georgian politician
- Bachana Arabuli (born 1994), Georgian football striker
- Bachana Khorava (born 1993), Georgian long jumper
- Bachana Tskhadadze (born 1987), Georgian former football forward
