= Simon Kaukhchishvili =

Georgian historian and philologist (1895–1981)

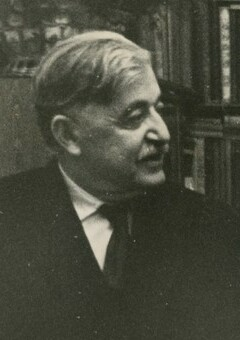
Simon Kaukhchishvili in 1963

Simon Kaukhchishvili (Georgian: სიმონ ყაუხჩიშვილი; October 1, 1895 in Kutaisi – May 11, 1981 in Tbilisi) was a Georgian historian and philologist known for his critical editions of old Georgian chronicles; Doctor of Historical Sciences (1927), Professor (1930), Academician of the Georgian National Academy of Sciences (1968).

He was born to a Georgian Catholic family in Kutaisi, western Georgia (then part of Russian Empire). In 1917, he graduated from the Saint Petersburg University and returned to Georgia where he was assigned to the recently established Tbilisi State University where he attained to the title of Professor in 1930 and chaired the departments of the Byzantine studies (1927–38) and of the Classical Philology (1940-1954). From 1960 until his death, he headed the Department of the Byzantine Studies at the Institute for Oriental Studies in Tbilisi. Under Joseph Stalin, he was persecuted by the Soviet authorities, being sacked twice, in 1938 and 1953, but survived the Great Purge.

Having left a diverse literary and scholarly legacy and commonly regarded as the founder of the Byzantine studies in Georgia, his crowning achievements are the critical editions of the Georgian Chronicles ("Kartlis Tskhovreba") and Prince Vakhushti’s historical-geographical treatise. He also translated and critically edited a collection of Byzantine sources on Georgia and Georgians published as Georgica in eight volumes from 1934 to 1970.
