= Nikoloz Berdzenishvili =

Georgian historian (1895-1965)

- Born: 9 January 1895; Gogolesubani, Russian Empire
- Died: 16 July 1965 (aged 70); Tbilisi, Georgian SSR
- Education: Tbilisi State University
- Scientific career
- Fields: History

Nikoloz (Niko) Aleksandres dze Berdzenishvili (Georgian: ნიკოლოზ (ნიკო) ალექსანდრეს ძე ბერძენიშვილი; January 9, 1895 – July 16, 1965) was a Soviet and Georgian historian who served as a Vice President of the Georgian Academy of Sciences from 1951 to 1957 and chaired the Department of History at Tbilisi State University from 1946 to 1956.
