= Society for the Spreading of Literacy among Georgians =

Former non-governmental organisation in Georgia (1879–1927)

Museum and library of the Society. Photo by Alexander Roinashvili

The Society for the Spreading of Literacy among Georgians (Georgian: ქართველთა შორის წერა-კითხვის გამავრცელებელი საზოგადოება, romanized: kartvelta shoris ts'era-k'itkhvis gamavrtselebeli sazogadoeba; also translated as the Society for the Extension of Literacy among the Georgians) was a charity founded by a group of leading Georgian intellectuals in May 1879 in order to promote a cultural renaissance among the peasantry of Georgia, then part of the Russian Empire. It survived into the early Soviet period and operated until 1926/7.

Organized by the noblemen Ilia Chavchavadze, Dimitri Kipiani, and local educators like Iakob Gogebashvili and Mariam Jambakur-Orbeliani, the Society ran a network of schools, bookshops and libraries throughout the country; trained teachers, and sponsored Georgian-language journals and magazines. Prince Chavchavadze, a prominent writer, went on to play a leading role in the Society, succeeding the first chairman Kipiani in 1885 until his assassination in 1907. The organization, tolerated by the imperial authorities, involved virtually all active Georgian men of letters, several philanthropists and officials, and was instrumental in Georgian national revival in the latter half of the 19th century.
