= Simon Janashia =

Georgian historian and public figure

- სიმონ ჯანაშია
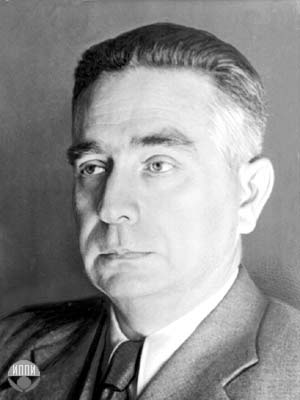
- Born: July 13, 1900; Makvaneti, Kutaisi Governorate, Ozurgeti uezd, Russian Empire
- Died: November 5, 1947 (aged 47); Tbilisi, Georgian SSR
- Occupation: Historian

Simon Janashia (Georgian: სიმონ ჯანაშია; July 13, 1900 – November 5, 1947) was a Georgian historian and public figure. He was a professor of history and one of the founding members of the Georgian Academy of Sciences.

Janashia was born in 1900, in Makvaneti in the southwestern Georgian province of Guria. His father, Nikoloz Janashia (1872-1918), was an educator and ethnographer, born in Abkhazia. In 1922, Simon Janashia graduated from the Tbilisi State University. From 1924 to 1947, he served as a lecturer (1924–1930), associate professor (1930–1935) and professor (1935–1947) there. In 1941, he was one of the founders of the Georgian Academy of Sciences (GAS), and from 1941 to 1947, he was vice-president of the academy and director of the Institute of History of the GAS. In 1943, Janashia was elected as a member of the Academy of Sciences of the Soviet Union (now the Russian Academy of Science). In the 1940s, he organized archaeological excavations in Mtskheta and Armazi in eastern Georgia.

Janashia's main fields of his research were the ethnogenesis of the Georgians and other Caucasian peoples, the history of feudalism in Georgia and the Caucasus, the history and archaeology of ancient Georgia, the history of Colchis and Caucasian Iberia, the history of Christianity in Georgia, and source studies of the history of Georgia and the Caucasus. He was an author of more than 100 scholarly works, including about 10 monographs. A full collection of Janashia's works was published in four volumes in Tbilisi between 1949 and 1968. Simon Janashia died in Tbilisi in 1947.

== Literature ==
- Simon Janashia, Tbilisi, 1948 (in Georgian)
- Shota Meskhia Tbilisi, 1960 (in Georgian)
- Simon Janashia (1900-1947). Bibliography, Tbilisi, 1976 (in Georgian, English and Russian)
