= Giorgi Chitaia =

Georgian ethnographer

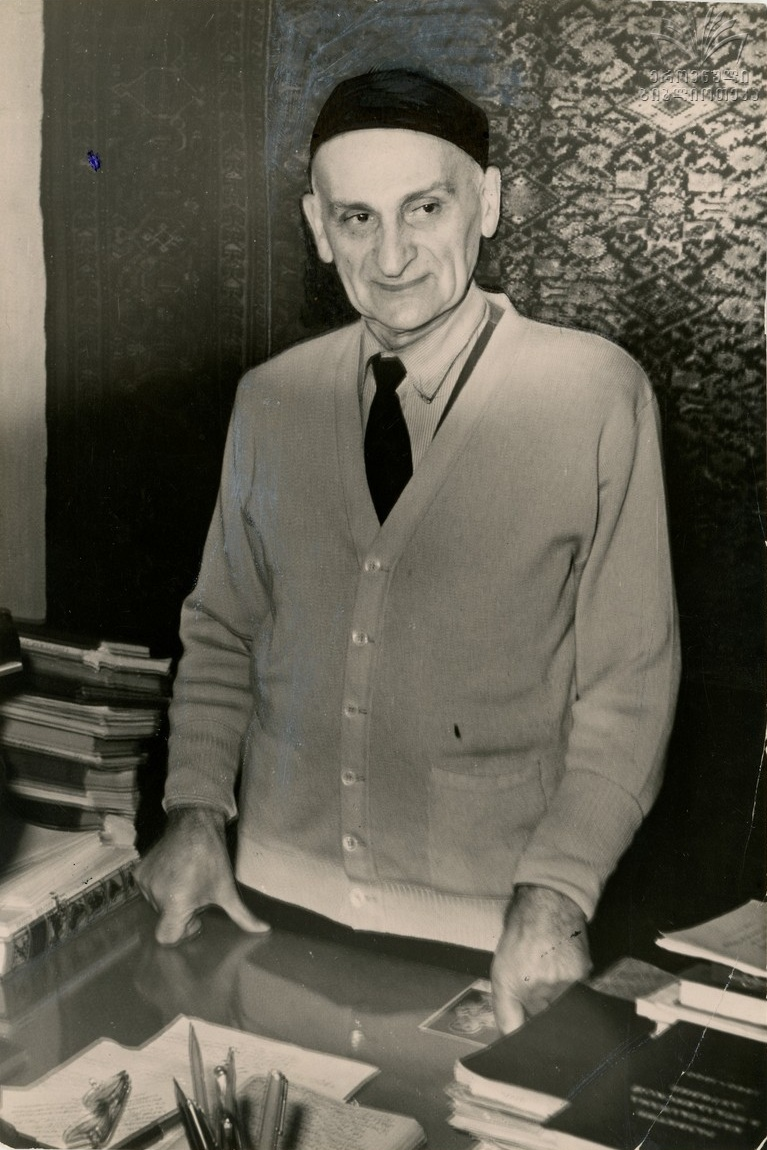
Giorgi Chitaia in 1970

Giorgi Chitaia (Georgian: გიორგი ჩიტაია, November 10, 1890, Poti – August 24, 1986, Tbilisi) was a Georgian ethnographer who worked at the university of Tbilisi. During his fieldwork he travelled throughout the country documenting regional cultures. Giorgi Chitaia was married to another well-known ethnographer Vera Baradavelidze (1899–1970). Chitaia played a vital role in preserving cultural heritage in Georgia during the Soviet occupation and rule. In 1922 he got the position to lead the newly created section of ethnography at Georgian National Museum. He held this position until his death in 1986.

In the 1960s he planned to construct a national open-air museum in Tbilisi. In 1966 the Giorgi Chitaia Open Air Museum of Ethnography was founded.

== General references ==
- Jacobsen, Gaute and Hans Jørgen Wallin Weihe (2012): Anders Sandvig og Maihaugen, Lillehammer, ISBN nr. 978-82-8217-202-8
- Tsereteli, Z. and Tsagareishvili, T. (2010): Georgia - Traditions, beliefs and Arts. Tbilisi: Foundation for Preservation of Georgia's Ethnographic Heritage.
