= Archil Jorjadze =

Georgian politician (1872–1913)

- არჩილ ჯორჯაძე
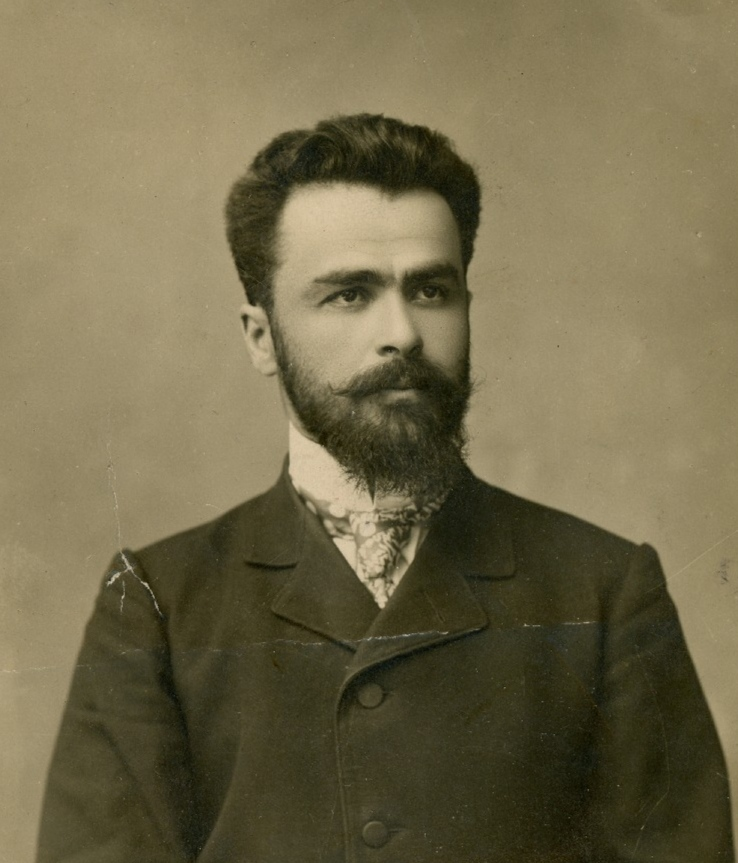
- Born: January 10, 1872; Tiflis, Caucasus, Russian Empire
- Died: March 21, 1913 (aged 41); Batumi, Russian Empire
- Resting place: Didube Pantheon
- Education: Tiflis Gymnasium
- Occupation: Politician
- Political party: Georgian Socialist-Federalist Revolutionary Party

Archil Konstantinovich Jorjadze (Georgian: არჩილ კონსტანტინეს ძე ჯორჯაძე, January 10, 1872, Tiflis – March 21, 1913, Batumi) was a Georgian politician, one of the founders and the main ideologist of the Georgian Socialist-Federalist Revolutionary Party.

== Biography ==
Jorjadze lived in England in a Tolstoyan colony. He collaborated in the journal Northern Herald, published under the pseudonym A. Sabuisky.

Jorjadze graduated from Tbilisi Gymnasium in 1892 and went on to continue his education at various universities in England, France, Switzerland, and Russia. In 1900, Jorjadze returned to Tbilisi. Jorjadze founded the publication Tsnobis Furceli.

In 1904, Jorjadze was a representative of the Socialist-Federalist party during the Interparty Conference in Geneva, Switzerland.

Jorjadze died as a result of tuberculosis.

== Thought ==
Titsian Tabidze, a Georgian poet and a leading figure of the Georgian symbolist movement, said that Jorjadze "directly connected the restoration of the torn thread of Georgian philosophy and the restoration of national consciousness to the leading school of symbolism". Tabidze wrote that Jorjadze believed that it was possible "for art to conquer national particularism".

Jorjadze said that "The state is a coercive organization, where the minority has authority on the majority, and this authority is so powerful when the kingdom is bigger. Therefore, the essence of the state is to seek expansion and occupation".

According to Iveta Gogava, Jorjadze "presented the problem of the uncertainty of the Georgian nation in terms of questions of nationality". In Gogava's view, Jorjadze saw the "two main elements of Georgian self-identification" to be "the Monarchy and the periods of war". Jorjadze emphasised "the unity of the nation-state and considered ethnographic relations as one of the key elements of national identity". Jorjadze summarised his view of the nation and national identity by saying: "The nation is a group of self-educated people, and nationality is the understanding of connections within the group for mobilization against a common enemy".

At the 1904 Interparty Conference in Geneva, Jorjadze's views on autonomy and Georgia's future were articulated through five points:

1. A full democratic regime should be established with extensive local self-government; 2. All non-Georgian nationals who live in Georgia should be allowed to satisfy their cultural, civil and other needs without delay; 3. Faith should be regarded as a private affair, a matter of man's conscience; 4. It is necessary to eliminate the conditions by which the revival and connection of free associations are hindered; and 5. It is necessary to remove conditions which restrict private and collective initiatives.

== Works ==
- ზ. ბაბუნაშვილი, თ. ნოზაძე, «მამულიშვილთა სავანე», გვ. 431, თბ., 1994
- Jorjadze A., Homeland and Patriotism: The National Problem in Georgia, Tbilisi University Press, 1990
