= Merab Turava =

Georgian jurist and professor

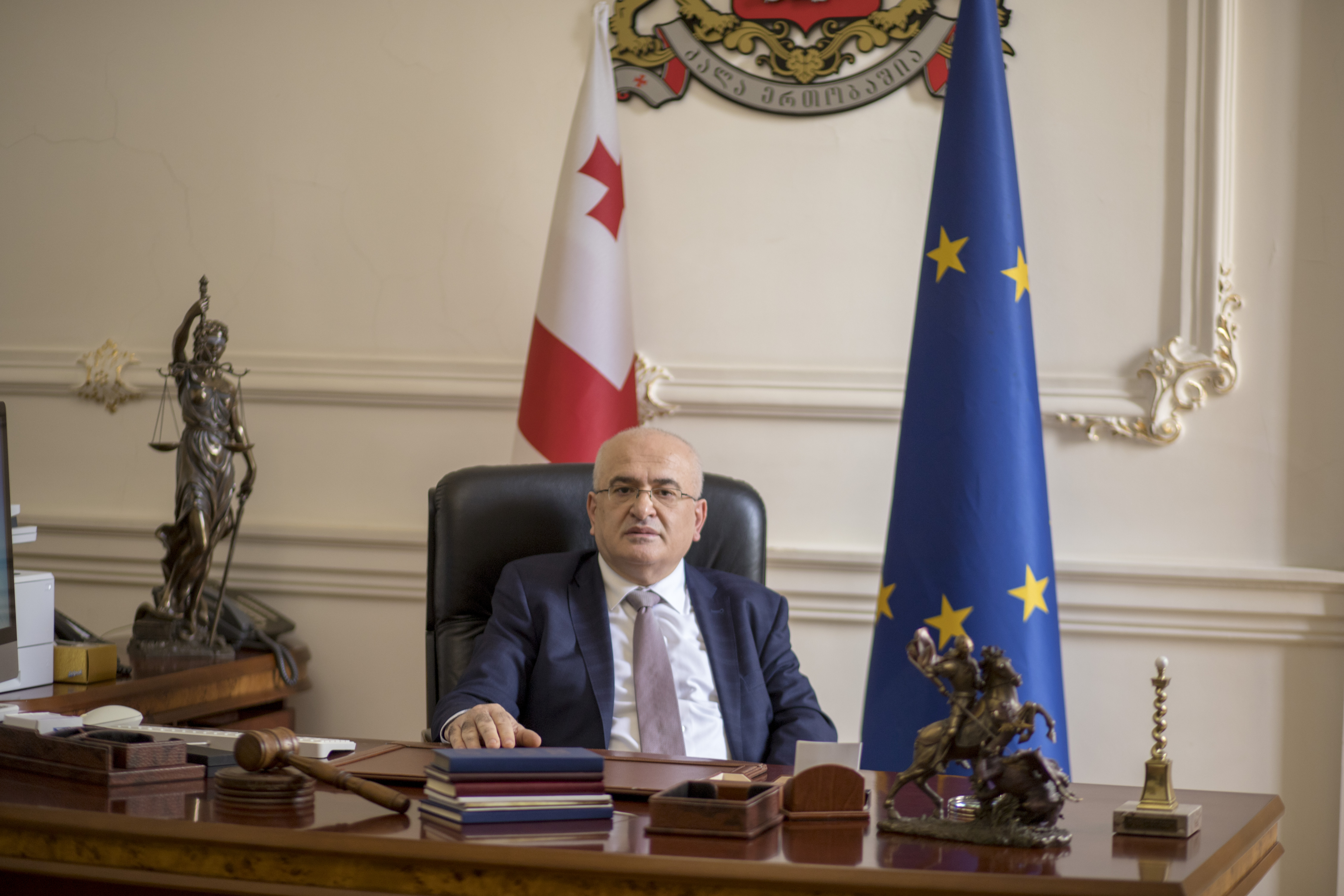
- Merab Turava in his office

President of the Constitutional Court of Georgia
- In office 25 June 2020 – 25 March 2025
- Preceded by: Zaza Tavadze

Personal details
- Born: 23 September 1964 (age 61)

Merab Turava (born 23 September 1964) is a Georgian jurist and professor serving as the Deputy Minister of Justice since April 29, 2025. He previously held the position of the President of the Constitutional Court of Georgia from June 25, 2020, to March 25, 2025. He has also held the office of a Justice and the Vice President of the Constitutional Court of Georgia.

== Biography ==
From 1999 to 2006, Merab Turava served as a judge of the Supreme Court of Georgia. From 2000 to 2005, he held the office of the Chairman of the Criminal Chamber and the Vice President of the Supreme Court of Georgia. Merab Turava was appointed as the Justice of the Constitutional Court of Georgia by the Parliament of Georgia on March 20, 2015. He started to exercise his authority as the Justice of the Constitutional Court on March 30, 2015, after taking the oath. On November 2, 2016, he was elected as the Secretary of the Constitutional Court of Georgia by the Plenum of the Constitutional Court. On January 12, 2018, he was elected as the Vice President and the Chairman of the First Board of the Constitutional Court of Georgia by the Decision of the Plenum of the Constitutional Court of Georgia. On June 25, 2020, Merab Turava was elected as the President of the Constitutional Court for a five-year term by the Plenum of the Constitutional Court of Georgia. His 10-year judicial term came to an end in March 2025.

== Academic and Research Career ==
Merab Turava graduated from the Faculty of Law of the Ivane Javakhishvili Tbilisi State University in 1990 with honors. From 1989 to 1990, he studied law at the Friedrich Schiller University Jena. From 1990 to 1991, he was a post-graduate student (Aspirant) at the Faculty of Law of the Ivane Javakhishvili Tbilisi State University. From 1992 to 1997, he was a doctoral candidate at the Faculty of Law of the Humboldt University of Berlin and a research fellow at the Institute of Criminal Law Sciences. In 1997, he defended his doctoral thesis under the supervison of Prof. Dr. Detlef Krauß and was awarded the degree of Doctor of Laws by the Faculty of Law of the Humboldt University of Berlin.

From 1998 to 2005, he was a docent at the Faculty of Law of the Ivane Javakhishvili Tbilisi State University, as well as a board member and lecturer of the training center for judges at the Ministry of Justice of Georgia (later called Judicial Training Center). During this period, he also had study visits at the German Judicial Academy (in Wustrau), the Academy of European Law (in Trier), at the German Federal Constitutional Court, the German Federal Court of Justice, the Federal Supreme Court of Switzerland and at international and European courts. From 1998 to 2001, he was a member of the working group of the State Legal Reform Commission of Georgia that elaborated the draft of the Criminal Code of Georgia. In the years 1999–2001, he was an expert of the judicial training project of TACIC-EU, in the field of criminal law.

In the years 2001–2003, he collaborated with the International Committee of Red Cross (ICRC) as an expert on the issues of the compatibility of the legislation of Georgia with the Statute of the International Criminal Court (the Rome Statute) and the implementation of the Rome Statute in Georgia, in cooperation with the German Professor, Claus Kreß. In 2002, Merab Turava was a research fellow at the Max Planck Institute for Foreign and International Criminal Law in Freiburg and conducted his scientific research in the field of international criminal law. During 2001–2004, he was the Head of the working group elaborating the draft Criminal Procedure Code of Georgia within the State Commission for the institutional reform of the system of the Georgian security and law enforcement agencies. In December 2004, he participated in the Fifth International Conference of the Chief Justices of the World in Lucknow, India. From 2005 to 2008, Merab Turava was an associate professor at the Faculty of Law of Ivane Javakhishvili Tbilisi State University. In 2008–2009, he was the Director of the research project of the Shota Rustaveli National Science Foundation -, For the Development of European Criminal Law in Georgia“. In 2008, he participated in the research on the compatibility of the Georgian legislation with the framework decisions of the European Union, carried out by the Georgian–European Policy and Legal Advice Centre (GEPLAC). From 2007 to 2012, he was a professor at the School of Law of the University of Georgia and served as the Head of the Criminal Law Department of the University of Georgia. In the years 2003–2010, Merab Turava had several research stays at the universities in Berlin, Jena and Basel. From 2006 to 2011, he participated in the academic project of the Volkswagen Foundation in the field of criminal law, conducted in partnership with the Friedrich Schiller University Jena (with Prof. Dr. Heiner Alwart) and Humboldt University of Berlin (with Prof. Dr. Martin Heger and Prof. Dr. Bernd Heinrich). Within the research scholarship of the Alexander von Humboldt Foundation, he worked as a visiting professor at the research institutes of the law faculties of the Humboldt University of Berlin, the Friedrich Schiller University Jena and the University of Cologne from 2011 to 2013. He was also a member of the Interagency Coordination Council of Georgia on the Criminal Justice Reform (starting from 2012).

Since 2013, Merab Turava has been a professor at the Faculty of Law of the Ivane Javakhishvili Tbilisi State University and the School of Law of the Grigol Robakidze University, as well as the Director of the Institute of Comparative and Transnational Criminal Law.

Merab Turava is the author of many academic articles and textbooks, such as: International Court of Criminal Law (2005); European Criminal Law (2010); The Doctrine of the Crime (2011); Criminal Law. The Overview of the General Part (9th edition 2013); The Fundamentals of International Criminal Law (2015). He is also the head of the editorial council of the Journal of Constitutional Law; publisher and member of the editorial team of the journal Deutsch-georgische Strafrechtszeitschrift (DGStZ); member of the editorial team of the journal Law and World; member of the international editorial team of the journal Kriminalpolitische Zeitschrift (KriPoZ).

In November 2025, Turava's editorship at the KriPoz was ended among some public controversy.

== Criticism and Sanctions ==
Critics say that the Constitutional Court under the leadership of Turava has become more deferential to the authorities, and repeatedly failed to challenge actions by the Georgian Dream government. In a controversial decision in 2022, under Turava's leadership, the Constitutional Court allowed for the abolishing of the State Inspectorate's Service, which widely had been seen as a safeguard mechanism. Among other judgements that aligned with Georgian Dream preferences, the Court under Turava's leadership in 2023 ruled that President Salome Zourabichvili could be impeached by parliament. According to some reporting, Turava voted for the impeachment. Under Turava's leadership, the court also rejected an appeal against the "Law on Foreign Influence" in October 2024, which had been widely criticized by human rights bodies, including the Venice Commission.

In its 2018 finding on Turava's appeal against his dismissal in 2006, the European Court of Human Rights criticized Turava for failing to "divulge relevant information", and added that the "Court further attaches importance to the fact that the [...] applicant is himself a highly qualified lawyer who has moreover been represented before the Court by two other professional lawyers. In other words, he knew or should have known about the nature of his procedural obligations before the Court [...]." The ECHR concluded that Turava had "failed to participate effectively in the proceedings of his or her own motion or provide information requested by the Court or otherwise fails to participate effectively in the proceedings."

In 2020, independent news media reported that Turava has received property concessions in the upmarket Tsavkisi suburb, showing documentary evidence that the municipality gifted a strip of land to his daughter. Critics have linked this concession to judgments that were seen as favourable to the Georgian Dream government.

Turava has been sanctioned by Lithuania, under its Magnitsky Amendments, intended for people involved in "gross human rights violations."
