= Zestaponi =

Zestaponi ზესტაფონი
- City
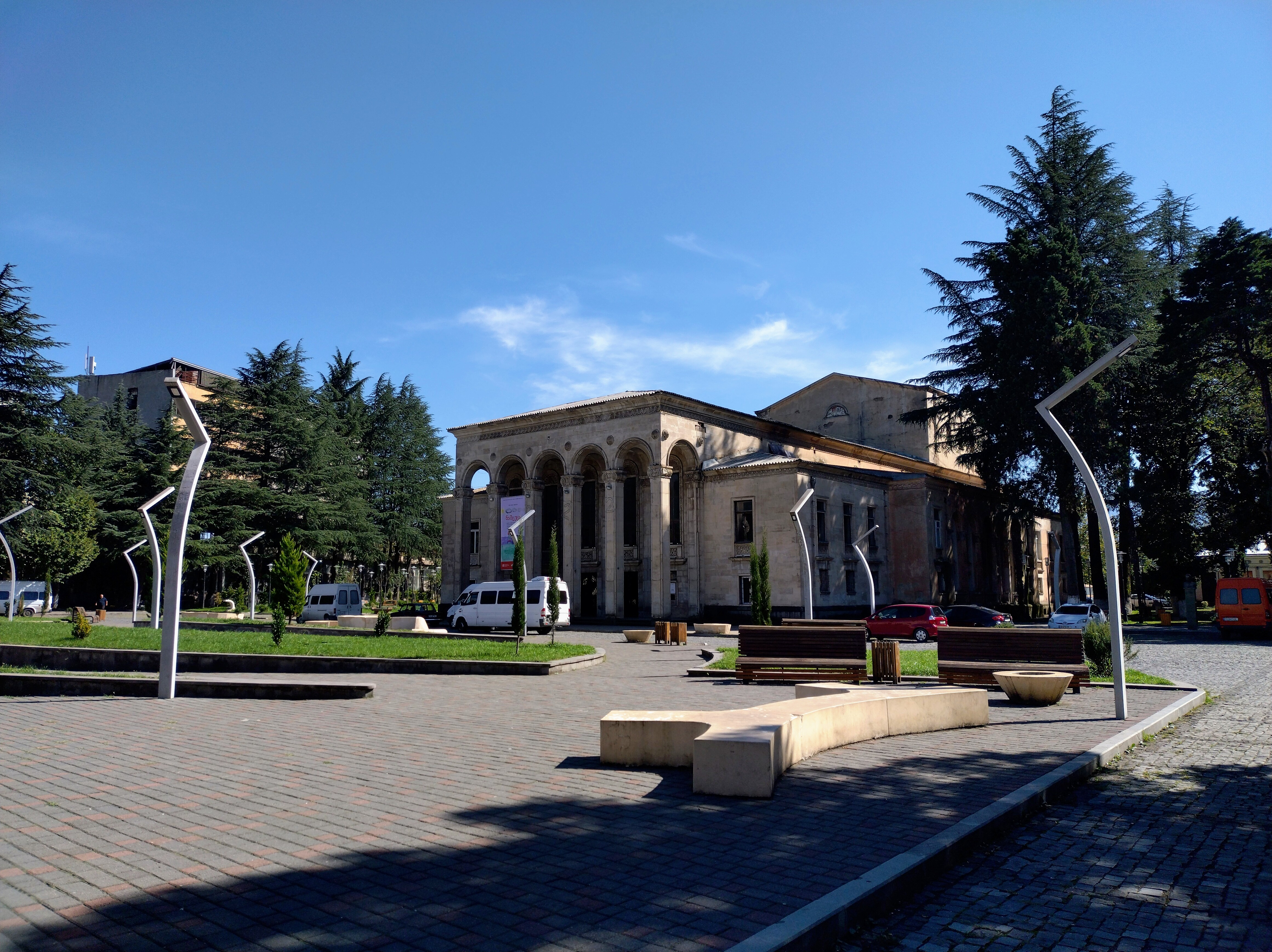
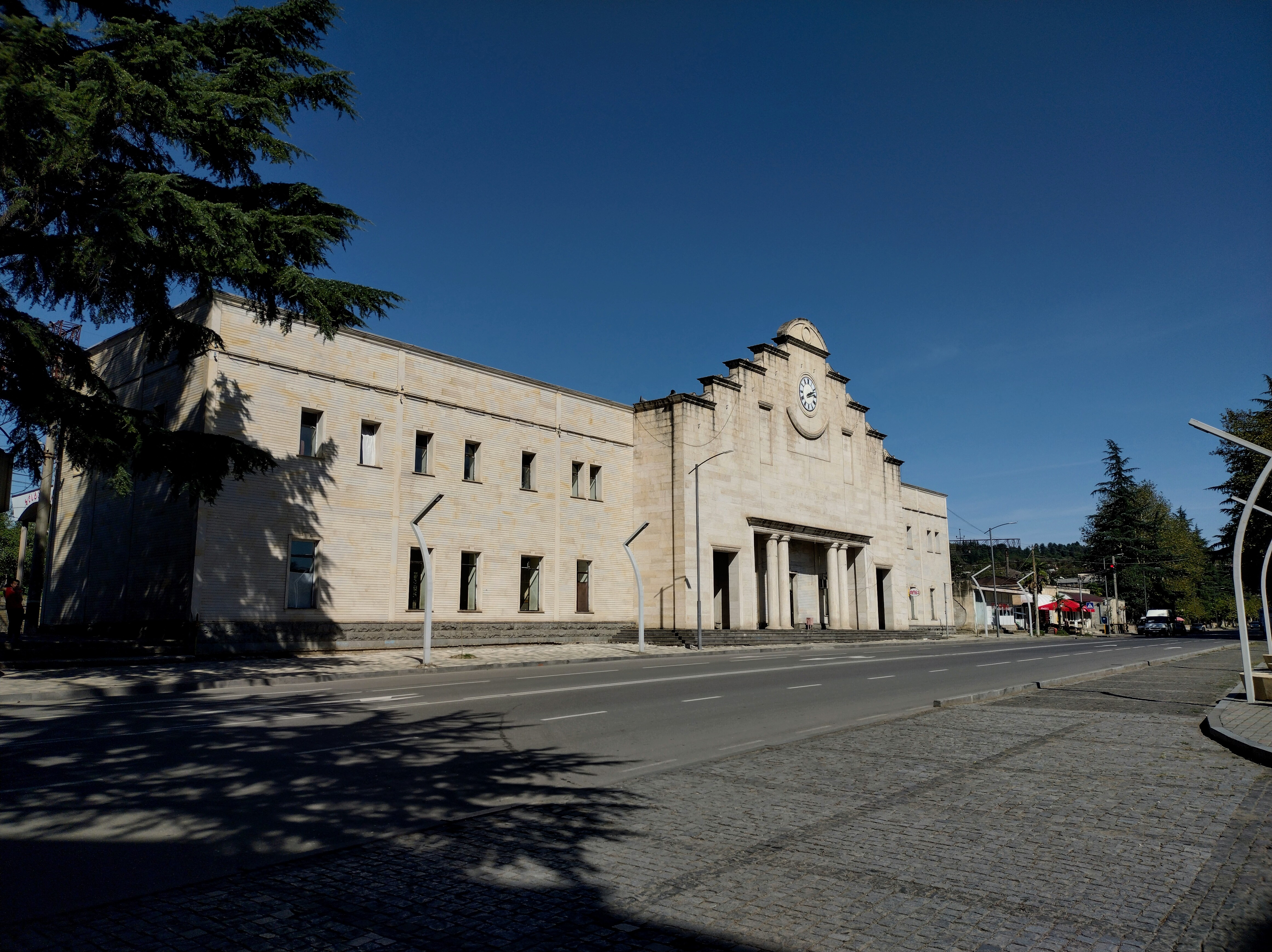
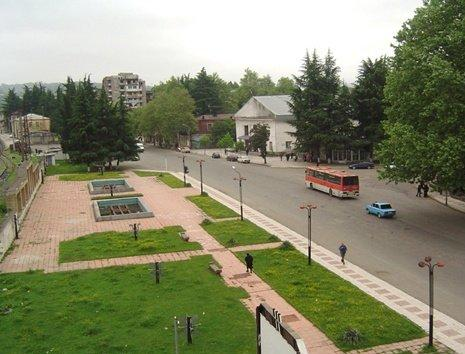
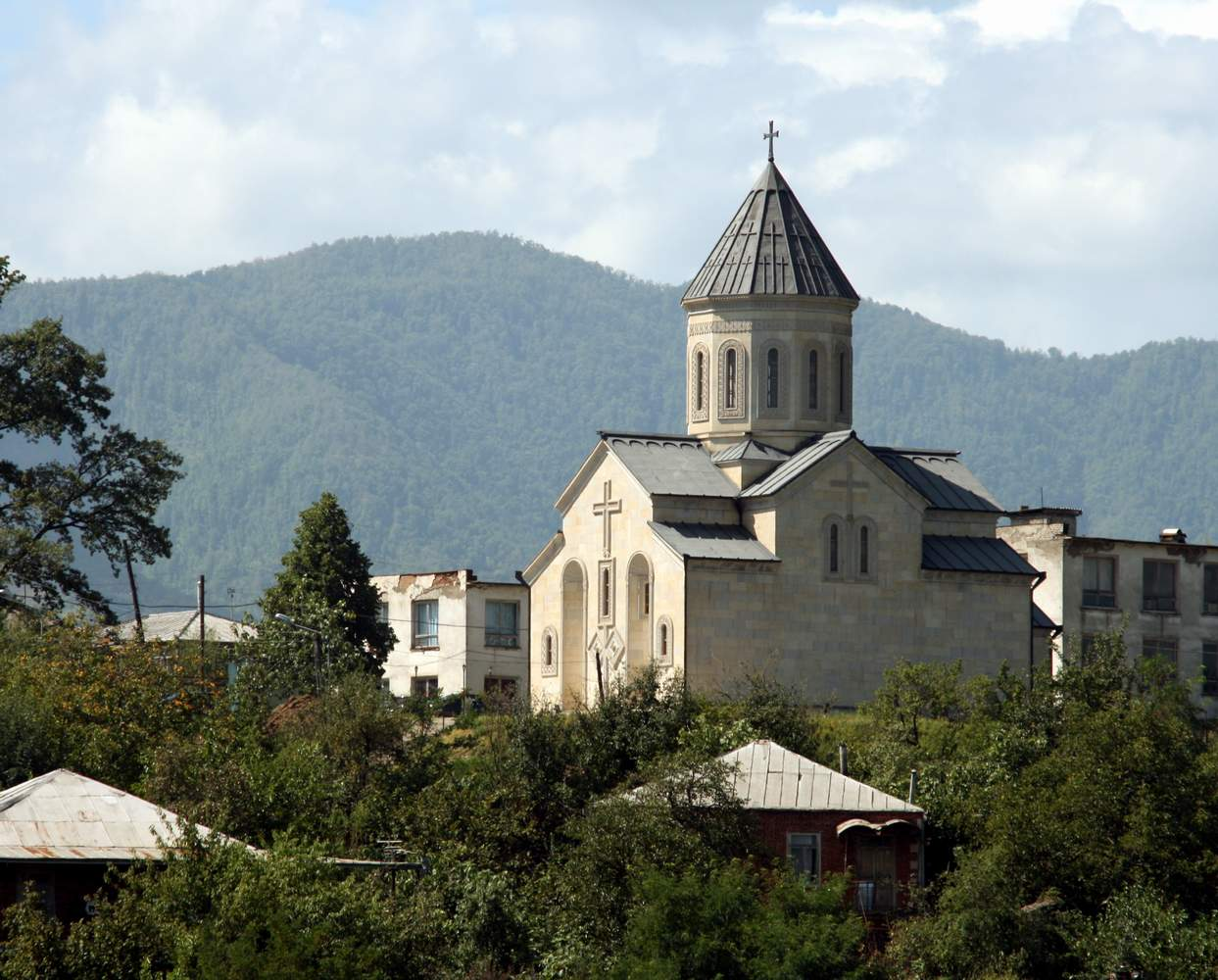
- Zestafoni Theatre Zestafoni Railway Station Central square Church of the Assumption of the Virgin Mary
- Interactive map of Zestaponi
- Location of the town of Zestaponi in Georgia Zestaponi (Imereti)
- Coordinates: 42°06′30″N 43°02′30″E
- Country: Georgia (country)
- Mkhare: Imereti
- District: Zestaponi
- Elevation: 520 ft (160 m)

Population (January 1, 2024)
  - Total: 20,212
- Time zone: UTC+4 (Georgian Standard Time)
- Postal code: 2000
- Climate: Cfa

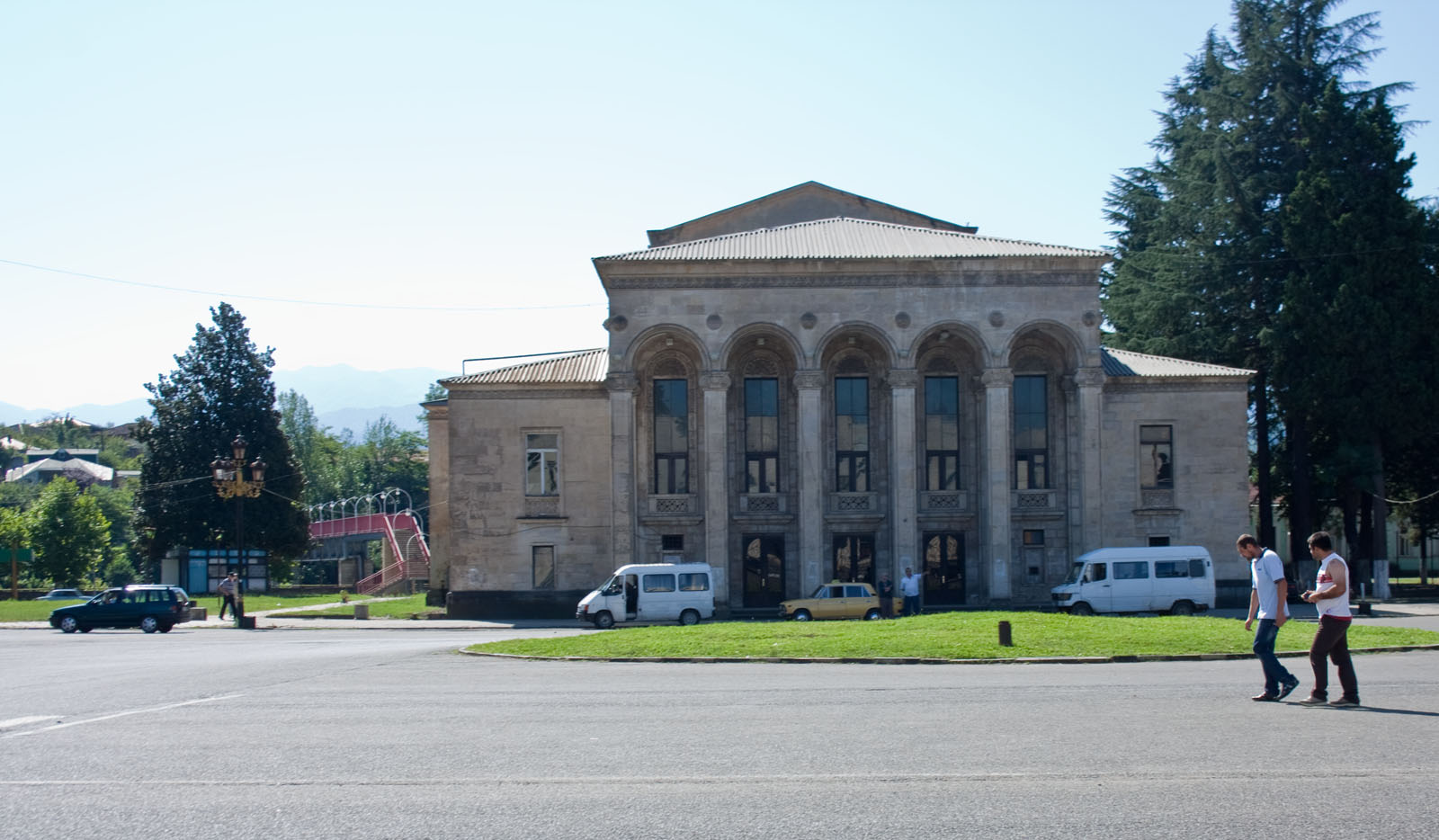
Zestaponi Theatre

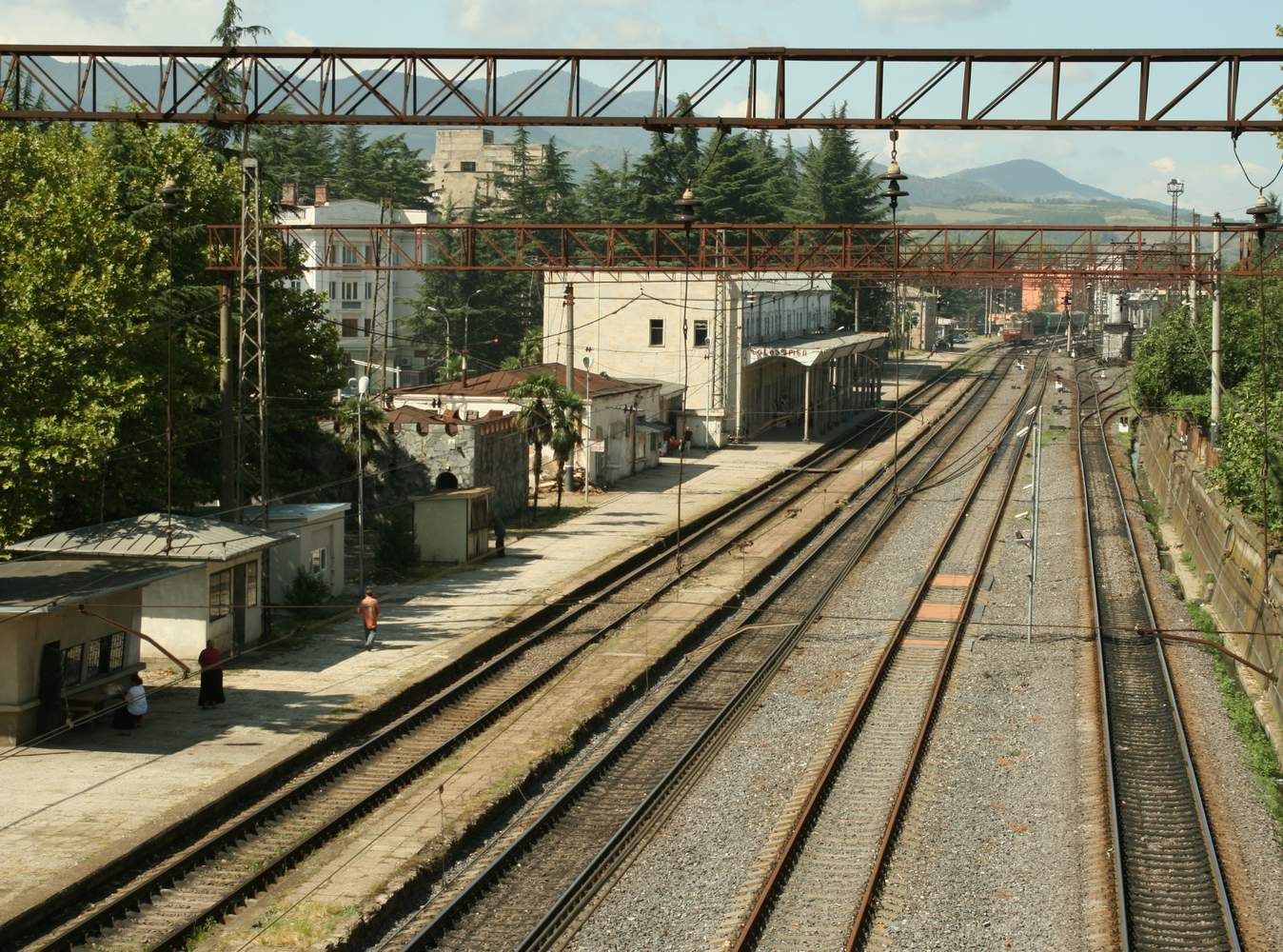
Zestaponi railway station

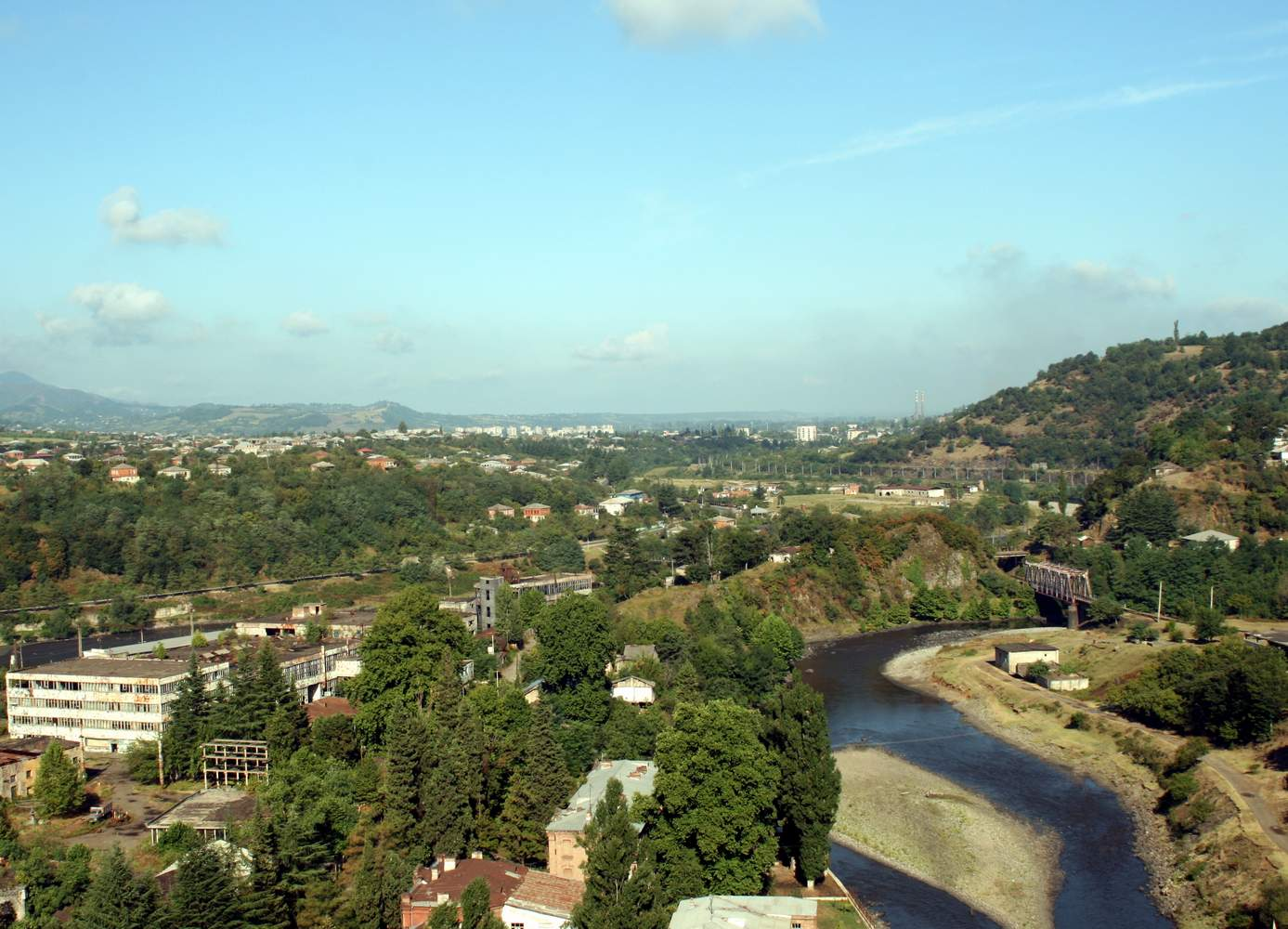
View from Shorapani fortress

Zestaponi (Georgian: ზესტაფონი, romanized: zest'aponi, Georgian pronunciation: [zestʼapʰoni]), also transliterated as Zestafoni, is the administrative center of Zestaponi District in Western Georgia. Zestaponi is the center of an ancient, historical part of Georgia – Margveti, which is a part of Imereti province. Zestaponi is the center of Margveti's Eparchy of the Georgian Orthodox Church. Zestaponi is situated in the furthest east of the Colchis Plateau, and is built on both banks of the Qvirila River.

It is an important industrial center, with a large ferro-alloy plant processing manganese ore from nearby Chiatura. Zestaponi is in the Kolkheti lowlands, a semi-tropical region with relatively cold winters averaging −4 °C (25 °F) in January and hot summers averaging 24 °C (75 °F) in August. The surrounding countryside is a wine-growing region.

== Industry ==
The town of Zestaponi and the smaller neighboring town of Shorapani are industrial centers. The Zestaponi ferro-alloy plant processes raw manganese ore shipped by rail down the Kvirila valley from Chiatura, supplying 6% of world demand. The largest ferroalloy plant in the country, in 1998 it produced 35,000 tonnes of silicomanganese and 11,000 tonnes of medium-carbon manganese alloy. This was well below its previous peak production of 110,000 tonnes of manganese-based alloys. The British steel trading company Stemcor acquired the ferro-alloy plant in February 2006.

On October 20, 2024, the ferroallow plant ceased operations for 6 months, after having operated nonstop for 365 days a year since opening in 1933.

Two other plants in the Zestaponi / Shorapani area produce electrical products, aluminum and copper cable and wire. There were more plants in the Soviet era producing fireproof clay, marble and clothing. Zestaponi is also one of the winery centers of Georgia. Wine prepared from the Tsitsqa and Tsolikouri species is widely known.

== History ==
Zestaponi lies 2 kilometres (1.2 miles) west of the small but ancient fortress town of Shorapani, founded by Pharnavaz I of Iberia in the 3rd century BC. The town of Zestaponi is first mentioned in historical records in the 1560s. The name of the city is connected with the bank of river Kvirila (Georgian: poni), upper bank (Georgian: Zeda poni), that was used by the local population and foreign travelers from ancient times.

In the 1820s a Cossack army was posted in the town, which was then called "Kvirila" after the river that runs through it. During the Russian Empire, the city was the administrative center of the Shorapani Uyezd of the Kutaisi Governorate. In 1920, the name was changed again to "Jugeli", after a famous revolutionary. In 1921, the city regained its historical name.

There are many historical monuments in the Zestaponi region: Zeda Saqara (11th century), Tabakini (6th century), Tseva (11th century), Sanakhshire and other churches, and castles from the early Middle Ages in Shrosha and Shorapani. Shorapani (Sarapanis) is the toponymy, that is mentioned in old Greek mythology. That was Sarapanis that Jason and his Argonaut friends approached during their travel in old Colchis (Kolkhida).

== Sports and culture ==
The local football club, FC Zestaponi, plays in the top league in Georgia and twice won the Georgian championship in the 2010-11 and 2011-12 season. The local women's basketball team was champion of Georgia in 2011. The city's stadium was built by Zestaponi Ferro-alloy Plant in 1952 and since its renovation has a capacity of 4,600.

The writer Boris Akunin and philosopher Tengiz Tsereteli were born in Zestaponi. The psychologist and philosopher Dimitri Uznadze was born in the nearby village of Sakara in 1886. Famous Georgian actors Shalva Ghambashidze, Ushangi Chkheidze, Sergo and Bukhuti Zakariadze were also born in Zestaponi. World wrestling (Greco-Roman) champion Mikhail Saladze is from Zestaponi.

== Climate ==
Climate data for Zestaponi (1991–2020)
Month	Jan	Feb	Mar	Apr	May	Jun	Jul	Aug	Sep	Oct	Nov	Dec	Year
Record high °C (°F)	22.3 (72.1)	25.5 (77.9)	30.0 (86.0)	36.2 (97.2)	39.0 (102.2)	38.8 (101.8)	42.0 (107.6)	42.5 (108.5)	39.5 (103.1)	34.3 (93.7)	27.0 (80.6)	25.0 (77.0)	42.5 (108.5)
Mean daily maximum °C (°F)	9.1 (48.4)	10.4 (50.7)	14.6 (58.3)	20.0 (68.0)	24.7 (76.5)	28.4 (83.1)	30.5 (86.9)	31.6 (88.9)	28.1 (82.6)	22.9 (73.2)	16.2 (61.2)	11.5 (52.7)	20.7 (69.3)
Mean daily minimum °C (°F)	1.8 (35.2)	2.1 (35.8)	5.0 (41.0)	8.8 (47.8)	13.7 (56.7)	17.6 (63.7)	20.3 (68.5)	20.6 (69.1)	16.7 (62.1)	12.4 (54.3)	6.7 (44.1)	3.4 (38.1)	10.7 (51.3)
Record low °C (°F)	−7.9 (17.8)	−12.0 (10.4)	−5.0 (23.0)	−5.0 (23.0)	4.0 (39.2)	8.0 (46.4)	13.0 (55.4)	11.4 (52.5)	5.3 (41.5)	0.3 (32.5)	−2.4 (27.7)	−8.3 (17.1)	−12.0 (10.4)
Average precipitation mm (inches)	140.2 (5.52)	123.9 (4.88)	126.8 (4.99)	91.0 (3.58)	81.7 (3.22)	82.7 (3.26)	63.3 (2.49)	63.5 (2.50)	81.6 (3.21)	132.6 (5.22)	143.0 (5.63)	131.6 (5.18)	1,261.9 (49.68)
Average precipitation days (≥ 1.0 mm)	12.2	11.8	12.9	10.3	10.3	9.6	8.1	7.1	8.0	9.3	9.3	10.7	119.6
Source: NOAA

== Notable people ==
- Dimitri Uznadze - psychologist
- Boris Akunin - writer
- Shalva Dadiani - novelist, playwright and actor
- Zaza Tavadze - is a former chairman of the Constitutional Court of Georgia

== Twin towns – sister cities ==
Zestaponi is twinned with:

- Tauragė, Lithuania
- Kiryat Bialik, Israel

== See also ==
- Imereti
