= Sakara =

Sakara can refer to:

== Music ==
- Sakara drum, an instrument played by the Yoruba and Hausa peoples of Nigeria.
- Sakara music, a Nigerian musical form using Sakara drums and other traditional instruments
- Sakara Records, a Finnish metal / rock record label

== Places ==
- Saqqara, a huge, ancient burial ground in Egypt near Giza
- Kveda Sakara, a village in the Caucasian country of Georgia
- Zeda Sakara, a village in the Caucasian country of Georgia

== People ==
- Alessio Sakara (born 1981), an Italian mixed martial arts fighter
- Julia Sakara (born 1969), a retired Zimbabwean middle distance runner
- Lasse Sakara, a Finnish acoustic guitarist who appeared on the 2005 album Country Falls by Husky Rescue
- Michele Sakara, an actress who appeared in the 1954 Italian-French comedy film A Slice of Life
- Sakara Pandi, a fictional character in the 2007 Tamil film Vel

== See also ==
- Sakkara (disambiguation)
