= Eva Gotsiridze =

Georgian constitutional justice

- ევა გოცირიძე

Justice of the Constitutional Court of Georgia
- Incumbent
- Assumed office 12 January 2018
- Preceded by: Lali Papiashvili

Personal details
- Born: 7 July 1963 (age 63) Tbilisi, Georgian SSR, Soviet Union
- Children: 1
- Education: Tbilisi State University

Eva Gotsiridze (Georgian: ევა გოცირიძე; born 7 July 1963) is a Georgian lawyer. She has been justice of the Constitutional Court of Georgia since 2018 and previously served as member of the High Council of Justice between 1997 and 2000, and between 2013 and 2017.

== Early life and education ==
Gotsiridze was born on 7 July 1963 in Tbilisi, then Georgian SSR. She graduated in law from the Tbilisi State University in 1987. She did a scientific internship in Wayne State University between 1996 and 1997. In 1998 she got her first PhD from Tbilisi State University with thesis Impeachment in the United States (Constitutional Dilemmas), and in 2006 Gotsiridze got a PhD in international law with a thesis entitled Freedom of expression in the context of fair balance of conflicting values.

== Career ==
Between 1992 and 2000, she held several senior positions at the Supreme Court of Georgia, including Chief Consultant and Head of the Department for the Unification of Judicial Practice. She was member of the governmental commission's drafting committee of the Georgian Criminal Code. Gotsiridze served as member of the High Council of Justice between 1997 and 2000, and between 2013 and summer 2017.

From 2000 to 2005, she directed the Human Rights Centre that she founded, later serving as Adviser on the European Convention on Human Rights at the Supreme Court of Georgia. Between 2007 and 2013, she worked as a contractor for the European Court of Human Rights on the processing and translation of its case law, and from 2009 to 2013 she practiced as a defence lawyer in cases involving proceedings before the Court.

Since 2012, she has been a professor at Saint Andrew Georgian University, teaching constitutional law, fundamental rights, European human rights law, and the law of the European Court of Human Rights. She has also served on national judicial reform bodies, acted as a UNDP national trainer on human rights, and has been a full member of the Abkhazian National Academy of Sciences since 2016.

In early 2017, she was one of the candidates for the post of judge of the European Court of Human Rights with respect to Georgia, but her nomination was rejected along two other candidates by the Parliamentary Assembly of the Council of Europe.

In November 2017 she was nominated by the government as justice of the Constitutional Court of Georgia to succeed Lali Papiashvili whose term ended in December 2017. Her nomination was criticised by civil society organisations, which alleged that Gotsiridze lacked political neutrality. On 1 December 2017, she was elected within 90 votes by the Parliament of Georgia as a justice of the Constitutional and officially assumed office on 12 January 2018 after taking the oath.

In August 2024, the court held a preliminary hearing on the appeal against the controversial Law on Transparency of Foreign Influence, which had sparked street protests. During the hearings, Gotsiridze focused on the legal substance of the legislation, questioning whether challenges related to its terminology were distinct from broader concerns regarding its effects and implementation. She also examined issues related to constitutional standards of review, freedom of expression, protection of journalistic sources, and personal data safeguards.
