= Gvenetadze =

Gvenetadze is a Georgian surname (Georgian: გვენეტაძე. Notable people with the surname include:

- Koba Gvenetadze (born 1971), Governor of the National Bank of Georgia
- Nino Gvenetadze (born 1964), Georgian magistrate, former President of the Supreme Court
