= Mzia =

Mzia (Georgian: მზია) is a feminine given name. Notable people with the name include:

- Mzia Amaglobeli (born 1975), Georgian journalist
- Mzia Todua (born 1956), Georgian lawyer and judge
