= Todua =

Todua (Georgian: თოდუა, Russian: Тодуа) is a Georgian surname. Notable people with the surname include:

- Alexander Todua (born 1987), Georgian rugby union player
- David Todua (footballer, born 1998), Russian footballer
- David Todua (footballer, born 2000), Russian footballer
- Elvira Todua (born 1986), Abkhazian football goalkeeper
- Mzia Todua (born 1956), Georgian lawyer and judge
- Natia Todua (born 1996), Georgian-German singer
- Sevasti Todua (born 1976), Georgian football player
- Nugzar Todua (born 1964), Georgian Professor
