= Uznadze =

Uznadze is a surname. Notable people with the surname include:

- Dimitri Uznadze (1886–1950), Georgian psychologist
- Iraklı Uznadze (born 1972), Georgian-Turkish judoka
