= Grand Chamber =

Grand Chamber may refer to:

- Full court, a court of law sitting with a greater than normal number of judges.
- Grand Chamber of the European Court of Human Rights, the last instance court of the European Court of Human Rights
- A judicial formation of the European Court of Justice
- The Supreme Court of Georgia (country)
- A historic court in the Parlement of Rennes
