= Supreme Court of Georgia =

Supreme Court of Georgia may refer to:

- Supreme Court of Georgia (country)
- Supreme Court of Georgia (U.S. state)
