= Sakkara (disambiguation) =

Sakkara is an ancient burial ground in Egypt.

Sakkara may also refer to:

- Abba Sakkara (1st century), an insurrectionary leader of Palestine
- Sakkara (novel), a superhero novel by Michael Carroll
- Sakkara, one of the names of the comic book character Purgatori

== See also ==
- Saccara (disambiguation)
- Sakara (disambiguation)
