= Saccara =

Saccara may refer to:

- Saqqara (also spelled "Saccara"), an ancient Egyptian necropolis

== See also ==
- Sakkara (disambiguation)
