= Manana Kobakhidze =

Georgian lawyer and politician

Manana Kobakhidze (Georgian: მანანა კობახიძე; born February 3, 1968) is a Georgian lawyer and politician. She served as a Member of the Parliament of Georgia from 2012 to 2017 and as First Vice-Speaker of the Parliament of Georgia from 2012 to 2016. Since 2017, she has served as the Judge of the Constitutional Court of Georgia.

== Biography ==
Manana Kobakhidze graduated from the Tbilisi State University with a degree in history in 1990 and from the Tbilisi Institute of Law in 2003. She worked in Georgian State Television as a reporter from 1990 to 1991. She was a teacher at Tbilisi 54th School from 1991 to 2001 and then a specialist at Pedagogical Innovations Center of Tbilisi Education Division from 1994 to 1995. She joined the Tbilisi-based human rights advocacy organization Article 42 of the Constitution in 2003. She became executive director of this organization in 2009. In 2012, she joined the new opposition party Georgian Dream - Democratic Georgia (GDDG) founded by the tycoon Bidzina Ivanishvili. On April 21, 2012, Kobakhidze became the GDDG's temporary chairperson as Ivanishvili was not allowed to lead the political party due to his being stripped of Georgian citizenship. Kobakhidze held this post until February 2013. The GDDG won a parliamentary plurality in the October 1, 2012 election, resulting in Kobakhidze being elected for the Sachkhere District.

On October 21, 2012, she was elected to become First Vice-Speaker of the Parliament of Georgia.

During the 2016 Georgian parliamentary election, Kobakhidze was 11th on the GDDG's proportional list. The GDDG got 44 mandates with its proportional list, resulting in Kobakhidze becoming an MP, serving her 2nd term.

On February 8, 2017, she was elected as the Judge of Constitutional Court of Georgia by parliament, and as a result, left the Georgian parliament.
