= Nino Kadagidze =

Georgian judge (born 1969)

- ნინო ქადაგიძე

President of the Supreme Court of Georgia
- Incumbent
- Assumed office 17 March 2020
- Preceded by: Nino Gvenetadze; Mzia Todua (acting)

President of the High Council of Justice of Georgia
- Incumbent
- Assumed office 15 October 2020
- Preceded by: Nino Gvenetadze

Personal details
- Born: 30 July 1969 (age 57) Tbilisi, Georgian SSR, Soviet Union
- Education: Tbilisi State University

Nino Kadagidze (Georgian: ნინო ქადაგიძე; born 30 July 1969) is a Georgian lawyer and judge. She has been judge of the Supreme Court of Georgia since 2019 and its president since 2020. She is also the chairwoman of the High Council of Justice since 2020.

== Early life and education ==
Kadagidze was born on 30 July 1969 in Tbilisi, then Georgian SSR. She obtained a law degree from the Tbilisi State University in 1993, thereby qualifying to practise law.

== Career ==
She began working at the Ministry of Justice between 1994 and 2000, holding various positions of responsibility, particularly in the fields of economic legislation and international legal relations. Subsequently, Kadagidze was judge of the Tbilisi District Court between 2000 and 2002, of the Administrative Chamber of the Supreme Court of Georgia between 2002 and 2012 and of the Administrative Chamber of the Tbilisi Court of Appeal between 2013 and 2019.

On 12 December 2019 Kadagidze was named judge of the Supreme Court of Georgia. She was its vicepresident and presided the Administrative Chamber.

The High Council of Justice nominated her on 10 March 2020 as president of the Supreme Court. Kadagidze was elected president of the Supreme Court on 17 March 2020 by the Parliament of Georgia, receiving 82 votes in a sitting boycotted by the opposition. She was appointed to fill the vacancy left by Nino Gvenetadze, who resigned for health reasons in August 2018. Both her appointment and her election were criticised by judges, opposition politicians and civil society groups.

On 15 October 2020 Kadagidze was elected chairwoman of the High Council of Justice, also to fill the vacancy of Gvenetadze.
