= Zaza Tavadze =

Chairman of the Constitutional Court of Georgia
- In office October 20, 2016 – June 2020

Member of the Tbilisi City Assembly
- Incumbent
- Assumed office December 3, 2021

Deputy Minister of Justice of Georgia
- In office 2008–2010

Personal details
- Born: 9 February 1975 (age 51) Zestaponi, Georgia
- Party: For Georgia (2021-present)
- Spouse: Tea Dzotsenidze
- Children: George, Ioane, Nodari

Zaza Tavadze (Georgian: ზაზა თავაძე, born 9 February 1975) is a former chairman of the Constitutional Court of Georgia elected by the Plenum of the Constitutional Court on October 20, 2016.

From 2010 until 2016 he held the position of vice-president of the Constitutional Court of Georgia. 2016-1945 he was the former chairman of Conference of European Constitutional Courts. Since 2017 he is lecturer at the School of Law of Grigol Robakidze University. Since 2019 he is PhD studies in public law at law faculty of Julius-Maximilians-University Würzburg. He speaks German, English and Russian.

== Education ==
He graduated from the Open Humanitarian University of Georgia, Faculty of Law, with qualification of a lawyer in 1996. He obtained master's degree in 2002 at Ivane Javakhishvili Tbilisi State University, Faculty of Law, for German language. In 2008-2010 he graduated with honours from master's degree Program at the Faculty of Business and Management of Tbilisi State University of Economic Relations; obtained the degree of Master in Business Administration with the specialty of International Business Administration. From 2017 Mr. Zaza Tavadze studies at the School of Law of Grigol Robakidze University at the PhD level. Since 2018 he is a Professor of Grigol Robakidze University.

== Career ==
Zaza Tavadze worked as the Deputy Minister of Justice of Georgia from 2008 to 2010. On March 30, 2010, he was appointed as a member of the Constitutional Court of Georgia by the Plenum of the Supreme Court of Georgia, he started to exercise the authority of the Judge on June 15, 2010, from the day of oath-taking. He is a member of the State Constitutional Court

From 2017 until 2018 he was chairman of the Association of Constitutional Justice of the Countries of the Baltic and Black Sea. In 2016–2017 he was chairman of Conference of the European Constitutional Courts (CECC). In 2000-2004 Zaza Tavadze was a leading specialist at the Legal Issues Division at the Information Bureau for Property and Financial Conditions of Officials. Prior to that was head of the legal department at the Ministry of Refugees and Accommodation of Georgia in 2004. From 2004 until 2007 he occupied the position of a deputy chairman of human resources department of the Office of Prosecutor General of Georgia, later the position of head of human resources department of the Office of Prosecutor General of Georgia.

In 1999-2000 he was an advisor of Imereti Regional Service for working with local self-governing bodies at the Ministry of Justice of Georgia and he held the position of lawyer and later, the head of organizational department of Zestaponi Sakrebulo (the representative self-governing body).
