= Nino Gvenetadze =

Georgian judge

- ნინო გვენეტაძე
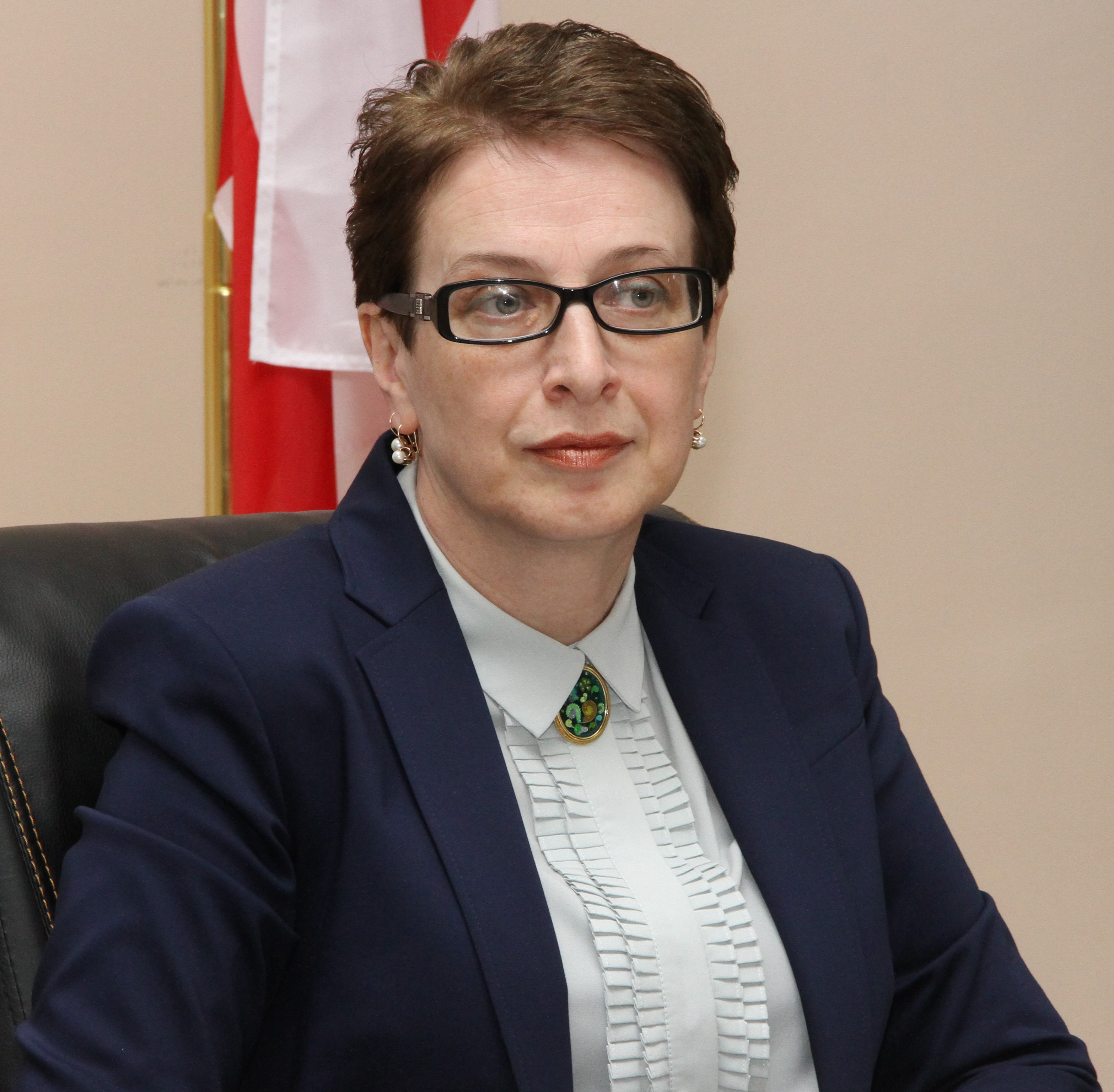
- Nino Gvenetadze in 2017

President of the Supreme Court
- In office 20 March 2015 – 2 August 2018
- President: Giorgi Margvelashvili
- Prime Minister: Irakli Garibashvili; Giorgi Kvirikashvili; Mamuka Bakhtadze
- Preceded by: Konstantine Kublashvili
- Succeeded by: Mzia Todua (acting); Nino Kadagidze

Personal details
- Born: January 27, 1964 (age 62) Khashuri, Georgia SSR, Soviet Union
- Education: Tbilisi State University

Nino Gvenetadze (Georgian: ნინო გვენეტაძე; born 27 January 1964), is a Georgian magistrate, President of the Supreme Court between 20 March 2015 until her resignation on 2 August 2018, first female ever appointed to this office in country's history.

== Early life ==
Nino Gvenetadze was born on 27 January 1964 in Khashuri, in the current administrative region of Shida Kartli. From 1985 to 1990 she studied at the from 1990 she studied at the Tbilisi State University, graduating from the Faculty of Laws with honors and becoming doctor in Laws in 1995. Between 1990 and 1993 studied a post-graduate in Criminal Law for the Institute of State Law of the Georgian National Academy of Sciences. Become Associate Professor in the Tbilisi University in 1999 in the Criminology Institute, until 2008, and named Professor of the School of Law in 2007. Between 1994 and 2001 was member of the Drafting Committee of the new Criminal Code, and president of the Young Lawyer's Association since 1998 until 1999.

== Judicial career ==
She entered in the Supreme Court on 1999 until 2006 as member of the Chamber of Criminal Cases.

On 20 March 2015 the Parliament of Georgia approved Gvenetadze as the new Chairwoman of the Supreme Court after President Giorgi Margvelashvili selected her, taking the oath on the same for a period of 10 years. On 9 November 2017 was about to resign after her opposition on appointing 34 new judges without term, but finally resigned on 2 August 2018 claiming health problems, being succeeded ad interim by Mzia Todua, the second female to preside the High Court.
