= Kveda Sakara =

Kveda Sakara ქვედა საქარა
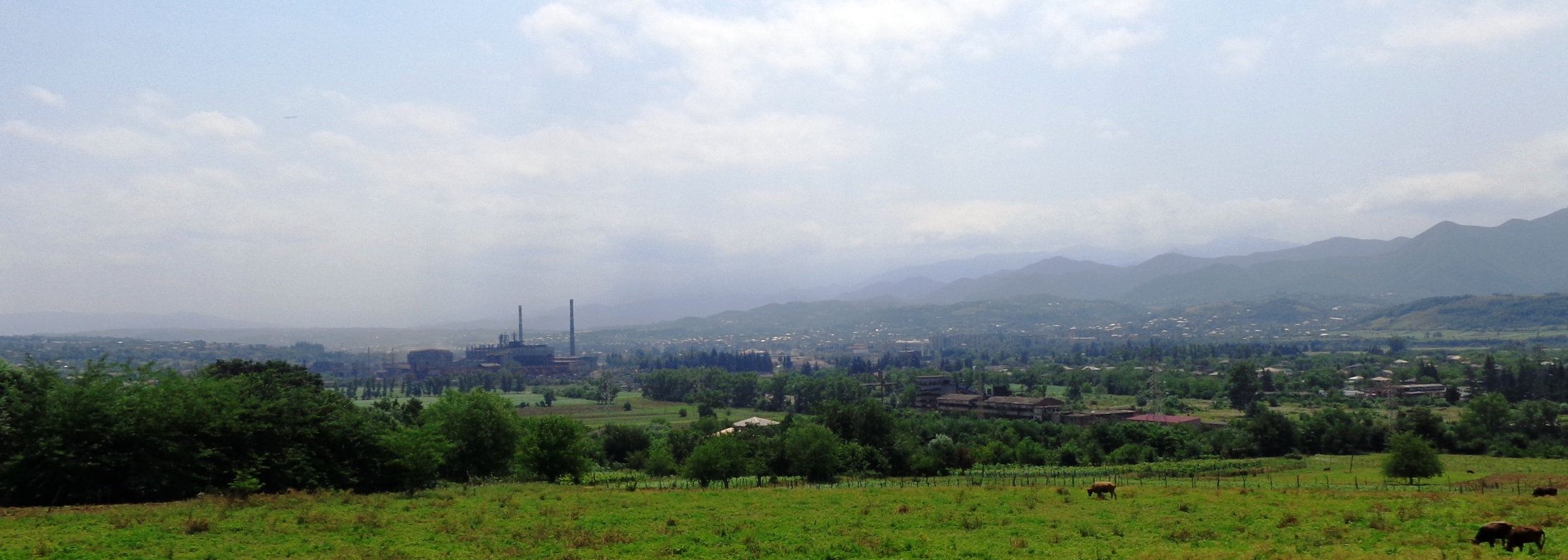
- Kveda Sakara

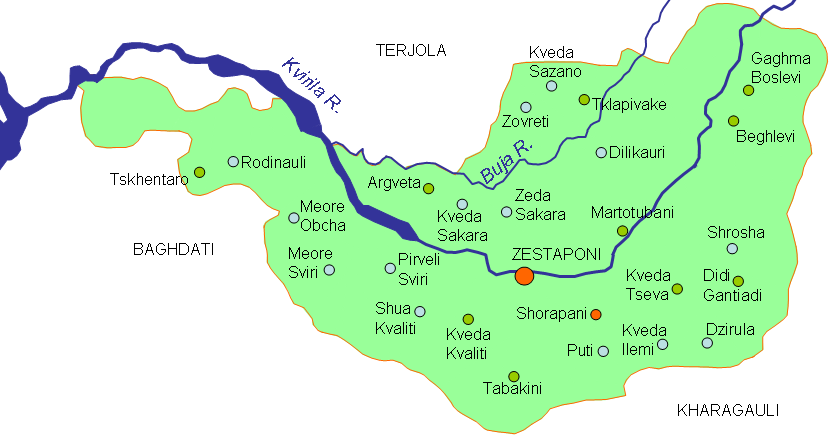
- Zestaponi region. Kveda Sakara is to the northwest of Zestaponi town

- Location of Kveda Sakara in Georgia
- Coordinates: 42°7′32″N 43°1′52″E
- Country: Georgia
- Mkhare: Imereti
- Municipality: Zestaponi Municipality
- Elevation: 560 ft (170 m)

Population (2014)
  - Total: 1,989
- Time zone: UTC+4 (Georgian Time)

Kveda Sakara (Georgian: ქვედა საქარა) is a community in the west of Georgia, about 40 km to the southeast of Kutaisi at an elevation of about 263 m, in the Zestaponi District of the Imereti province (not to be confused with nearby Zeda Sakara in the same region. The community includes the villages of Kveda Sakara, Argevta and Chalatke. The economy is primarily agricultural, based on fruit growing. Kveda Sakara is known for the medieval Cholabauri bridge.

There is a kindergarten in Chalatke and a public school in Kveda Sakara. Recently the village benefited from a project to rehabilitate the high voltage electricity network undertaken by the Georgia Employment and Infrastructure Initiative (GEII), which is funded by USAID. The community was also approved for funding for a fruit collection and processing enterprise under the Zestaponi Municipal Economic Development Plan for 2008–2011, also part of GEII.

== See also ==
- Imereti
