= Constitutional Court of Georgia =

- საქართველოს საკონსტიტუციო სასამართლო
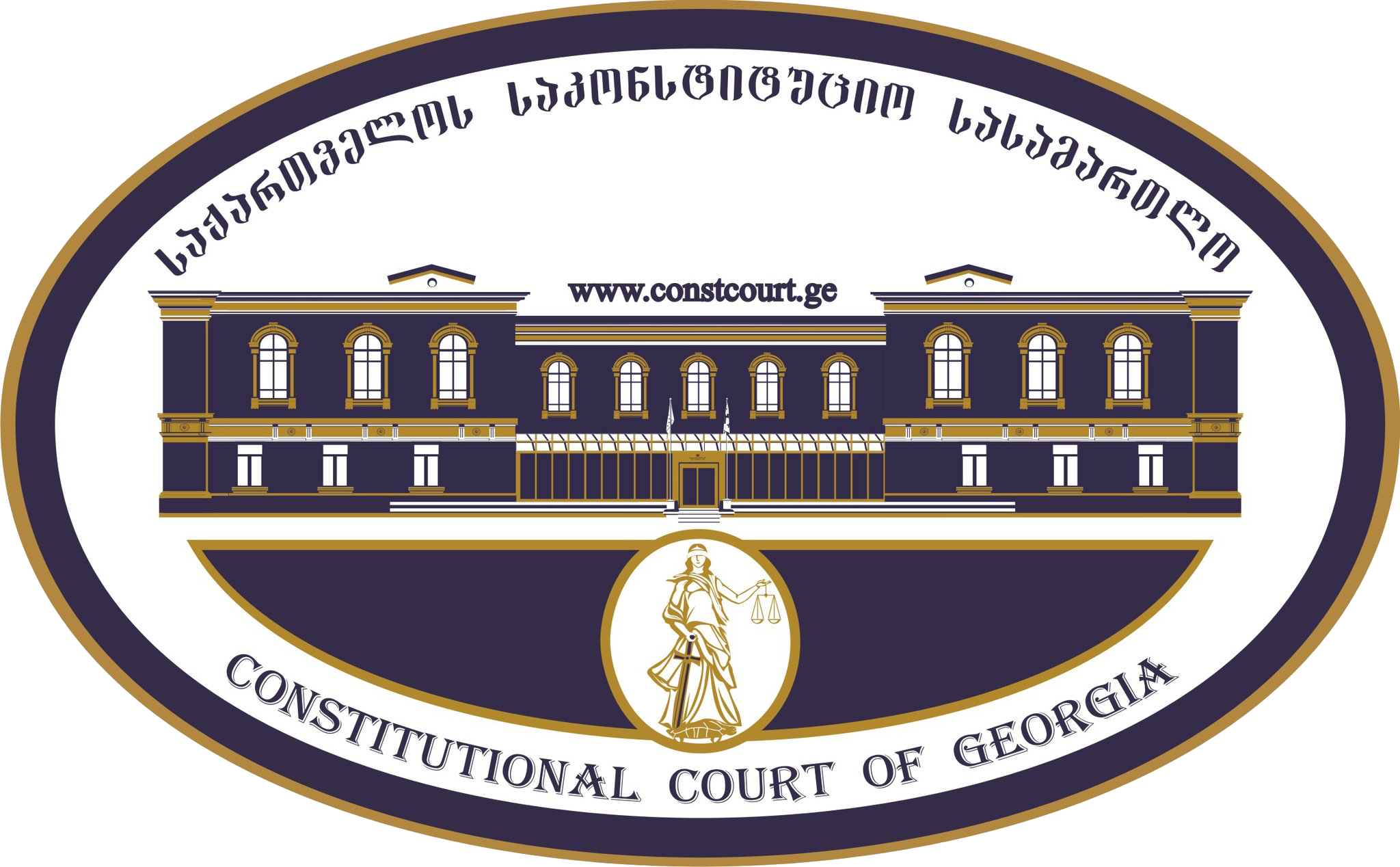

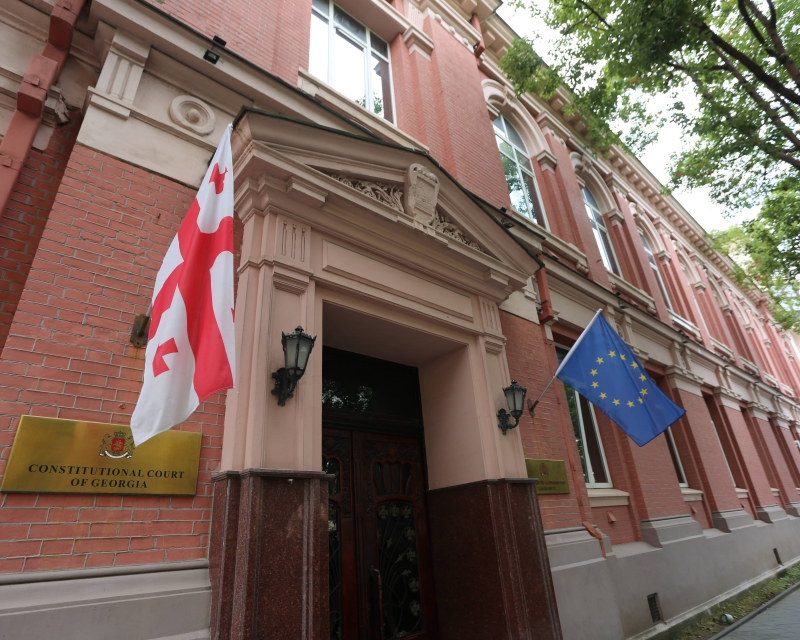
- Court Building in Batumi
- Established: 1996; 30 years ago
- Location: Batumi, Georgia
- Composition method: 3 Judges Appointed by the President of Georgia; 3 Judges Elected by the Parliament of Georgia; 3 Judges designated by the Supreme Court of Georgia
- Authorised by: Constitution of Georgia; Organic Law On the Constitutional Court
- Judge term length: 10 years
- Number of positions: 9
- Website: constcourt.ge

President of the Constitutional Court
- Currently: Revaz Nadaraia
- Since: April 16, 2025; 18 months ago

The Constitutional Court of Georgia (Georgian: საქართველოს საკონსტიტუციო სასამართლო, romanized: sakartvelos sak'onst'it'utsio sasamartlo) is the constitutional court of Georgia, the country's judicial body of constitutional review, having the greatest significance with the view of securing constitutional provisions and separation of powers, and protecting human rights and freedoms.

The Constitutional Court was established in 1996. The legal basis of its organisation and activity is the Constitution of Georgia, the Organic Law of Georgia "On the Constitutional Court of Georgia", and the Rules of the Constitutional Court. The legislation underwent several amendments from 2002 to 2018, the constitutional legal proceedings being made simplified and more expeditious. The Constitutional Court of Georgia was moved from Tbilisi, the capital of Georgia, to Batumi, the main city of the Autonomous Republic of Adjara, as part of the process of government decentralization, on 5 July 2007.

== Structure and composition ==
The Constitutional Court of Georgia consists of nine judges appointed for a term of 10 years. All three branches of state powers participate in the formation of the Constitutional Court on an equal basis—three members are appointed by the President of Georgia, three members are elected by the Parliament by a majority of at least three fifths of the total number of its members, and three members are appointed by the Supreme Court.

A judge of the Constitutional Court can be a citizen of Georgia no younger than 35, with a higher legal education and at least 10 years of professional experience. A judge can not have previously held this office. The Constitutional Court elects a chairperson from among its members for a term of 5 years. A person who has already held the position of chairperson of the Constitutional Court can not be re-elected.

== Powers ==
The Constitutional Court of Georgia has several duties and powers such as to:

- review the constitutionality of a legal act with respect to the fundamental human rights on the basis of a claim submitted by a natural person, a legal person, or the Public Defender of Georgia;
- make decisions on the constitutionality of a legal act on the basis of a claim submitted by the President of Georgia, by at least one fifth of the Members of Parliament, or by the Government;
- on the basis of a submission by a common court, review the constitutionality of a normative act to be applied by the common court when hearing a particular case, and which may contravene the Constitution according to a reasonable assumption of the court;
- review disputes about the competences of a respective body on the basis of a claim submitted by the President of Georgia, Parliament, the Government, the High Council of Justice, the General Prosecutor, the Board of National Bank, the General Auditor, the Public Defender or the supreme representative or executive body of an autonomous republic;
- review the constitutionality of international treaties on the basis of a claim submitted by the President of Georgia, the Government, or by at least one fifth of the Members of Parliament;
- review the constitutionality of activities of a political party, or of the termination of powers of a member of the representative body elected upon nomination by this political party, on the basis of a claim submitted by the President of Georgia, the Government, or by at least one fifth of the Members of Parliament;
- review the constitutionality of Parliament's decision to acknowledge or prematurely terminate the powers of a Member of Parliament, on the basis of a claim submitted by at least one fifth of the Members of Parliament or the respective individual;
- review disputes related to norms regulating referendums or elections, and the constitutionality of referendums and elections held or to be held based on these norms, on the basis of a claim submitted by the President of Georgia, by at least one fifth of the Members of Parliament, or by the Public Defender;
- review the constitutionality of a normative act on the basis of a claim submitted by the representative body of a local self-government.

A judgment by the Constitutional Court is final. An act or a part thereof that has been recognized as unconstitutional ceases to have a legal effect as soon as the respective judgment by the Constitutional Court is made public, unless otherwise envisaged by the relevant judgment.

== Current composition ==
- Revaz Nadaraia, president
- Vasil Roinishvili, vice president
- Manana Kobakhidze, vice president
- Giorgi Tevdorashvili, secretary
- Eva Gotsiridze
- Giorgi Kverenchkiladze
- Teimuraz Tughushi
- Giorgi Modebadze
