= Zestaponi Municipality =

Coordinates: 42°06′20″N 43°02′09″E

Zestaponi Municipality ზესტაფონის მუნიციპალიტეტი
- Municipality
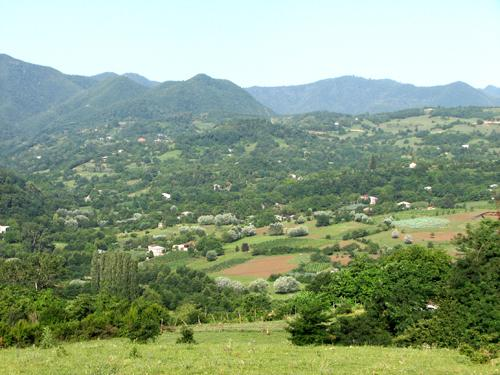
- Tabakini Church near Argveti

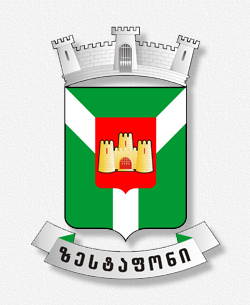
- Flag Seal

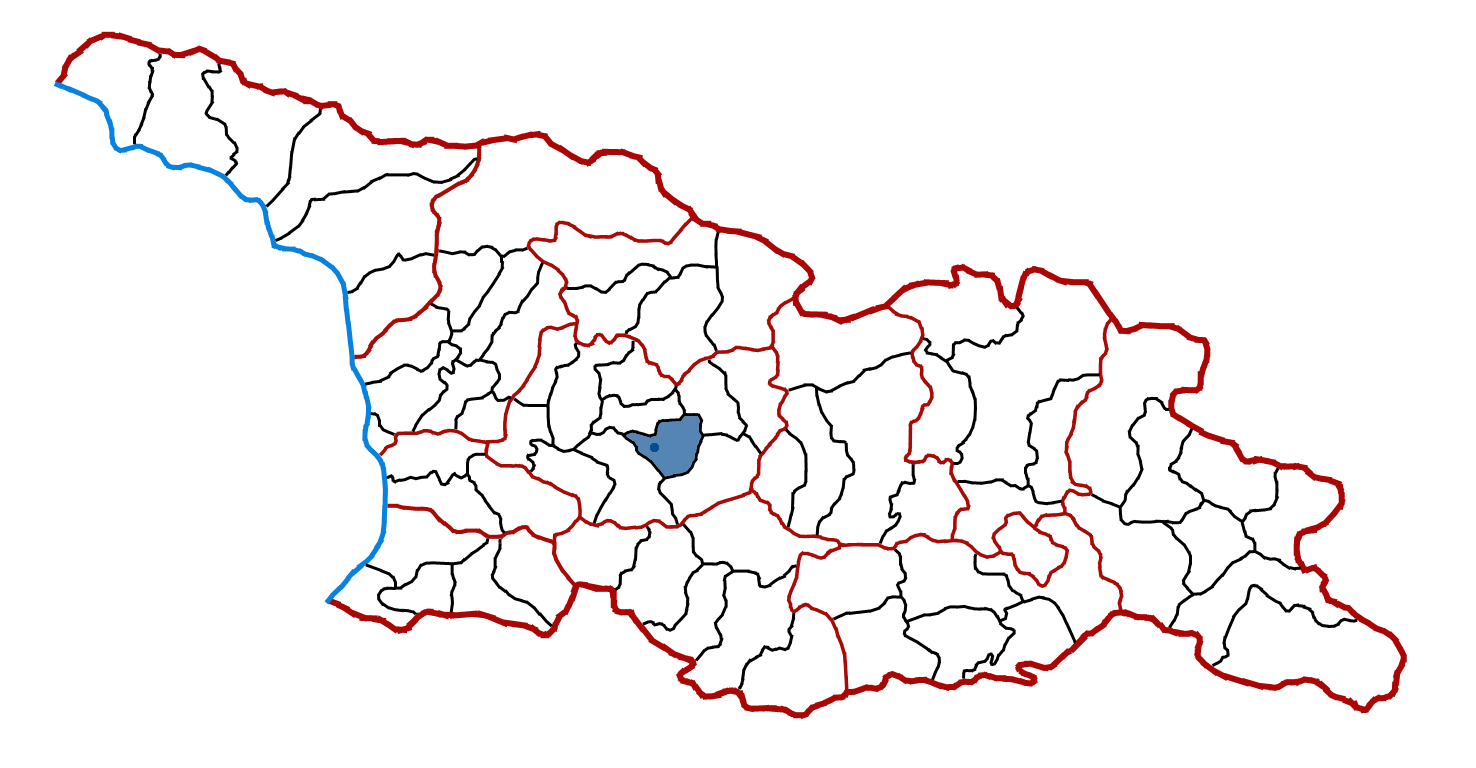
- Location of the municipality within Georgia
- Interactive map of Zestaponi Municipality
- Country: Georgia
- Region: Imereti
- Capital: Zestaponi

Government
  - Type: Mayor–Council
  - Body: Zestaponi Municipal Assembly
  - Mayor: Giorgi Goglichidze (Georgian Dream)

Area
  - Total: 423 km^{2} (163 sq mi)

Population (2014)
  - Total: 57,628

Population by ethnicity
  - Georgians: 99.5 %
  - Russians: 0.2 %
  - Armenians: 0.1 %
  - Ukrainians: 0.1 %
- Time zone: UTC+4 (Georgian Standard Time)

Zestaponi (Georgian: ზესტაფონის მუნიციპალიტეტი) is a municipality of Georgia, in the region of Imereti. The municipality covers a total area of 423 square kilometres and as of 2014 it had a population total of 57,628 people. Its main town is Zestaponi which is an important industrial center, with a large ferro-alloy plant processing manganese ore from nearby Chiatura. The municipality is a notable wine-growing region.

== Geography ==
The municipality to the west of the town of Zestaponi is part of the Kolkheti lowlands at a height of 90-200 m, with the land rising to the east to the Imereti plateau at 500 m through a hilly zone with narrow rocky gorges. The region is bounded to the south with a low range of mountains rising to about 1,000 m. The lowland zone has relatively cold winters averaging -4 °C in January, with hot summers averaging 24 °C in August. Precipitation is about 1190 mm annually. In the higher areas the temperature is lower and there is more rainfall. The Kvirila River runs through the region from east to west, fed by many smaller rivers. Flooding is common in the spring.

The municipality is forested with hornbeam, oak, beech, chestnut, alder and many other tree species. The southern range has beech, maple, lime and Imeretian oak. The land has been partly cleared for agriculture in the lowlands and hilly areas, but is more densely forested in the southern mountain range. The forests are home to wolf, fox, jackal, badger, rabbit and smaller animals.

== Settlements ==
=== Towns ===
The town of Zestaponi and the smaller neighboring town of Shorapani are industrial centers. The Zestaponi ferro-alloy plant processes raw manganese ore shipped by rail down the Kvirila valley from Chiatura, supplying 6% of world demand. It is the largest ferroalloy plant in the country. There were more factories in the Soviet era, but many have closed down.

=== Rural areas ===
The rural areas include the communities of Boslevi, Dilikauri, Dzirula, Ilemi, Kldeeti, Kvaliti, Kveda Sakara, Kveda Sazano, Meore Sviri, Puti, Pirveli Sviri, Rodinauli, Sanakhshire, Shrosha, Tskhratskaro, Zeda Sakara and Zovreti. Each community typically includes two or three villages. There are medieval castles in several villages, notably the Shorapani and Sviri castles in the historical village of Argveti and a castle from the 6th-7th centuries in Tabakini. There are old churches, ancient wine cellars and other points of interest for tourism.

The Zestaponi Municipality has 5,000 hectares of vineyards accounting for 80% of all farmland. The Sakara Viticulture and Winemaking Scientific-Research Station plays an important role in developing viticulture in the Zestaponi Region. Other crops include maize and vegetables, cattle breeding and swine production.

The district's main settlements are:

Rank	Settlement	Population
1	Zestaponi	20 814
2	Zeda Sakara	2 099
3	Kveda Sakara	1 989
4	Puti	1 564
5	Zovreti	1 513
6	Shorapani	1 258

== Politics ==
Zestaponi Municipal Assembly (Georgian: ზესტაფონის საკრებულო, Zestaponis Sakrebulo) is a representative body in Zestaponi Municipality, consisting of 39 members which are elected every four years. The last election was held in October 2021.

Party	2017	2021	Current Municipal Assembly
Georgian Dream	29	27	
United National Movement	3	10	
For Georgia		2	
European Georgia	2		
Alliance of Patriots	2		
Total	36	39	

== Gallery ==
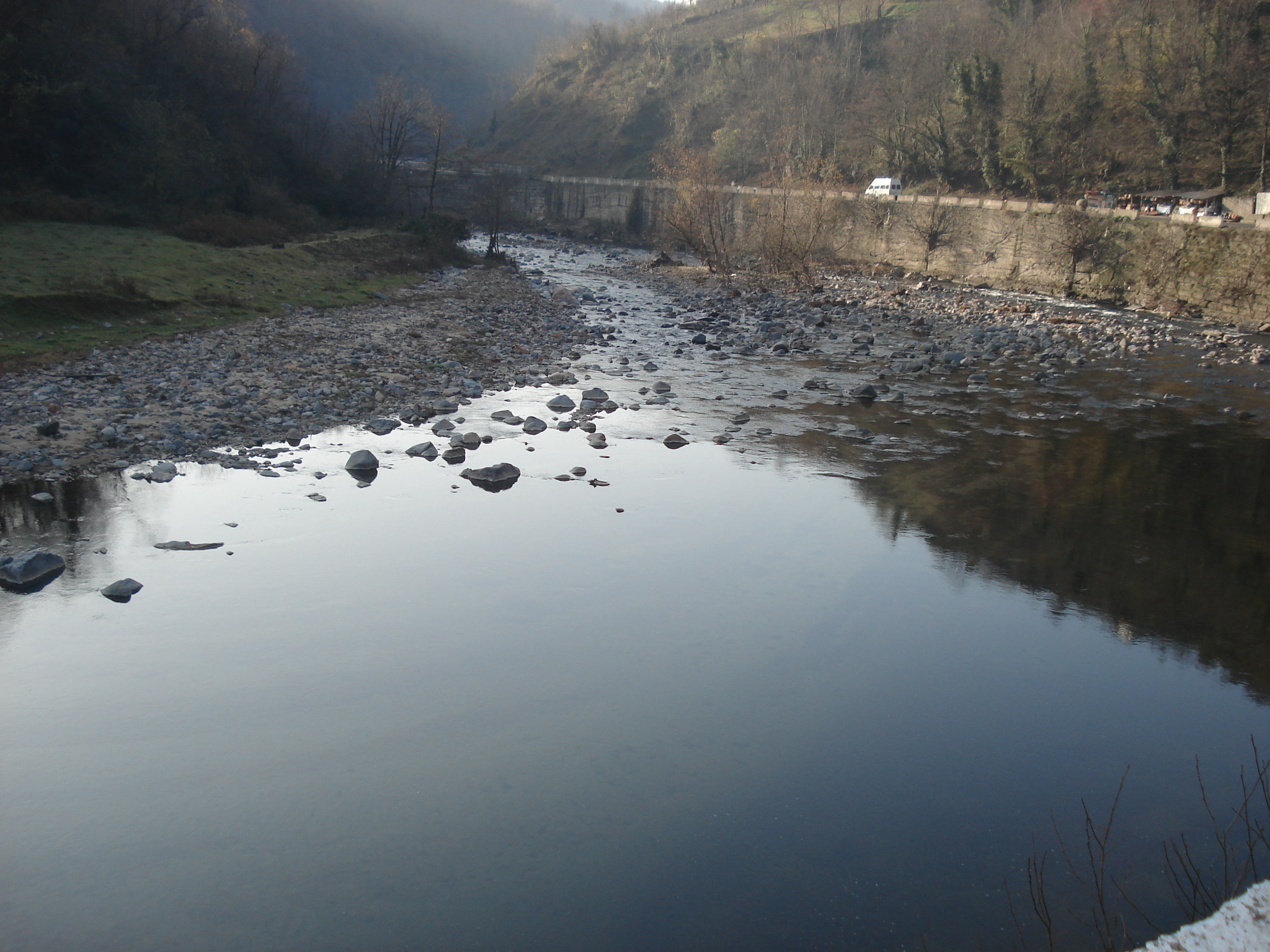
River near Shrosha, Zestaponi

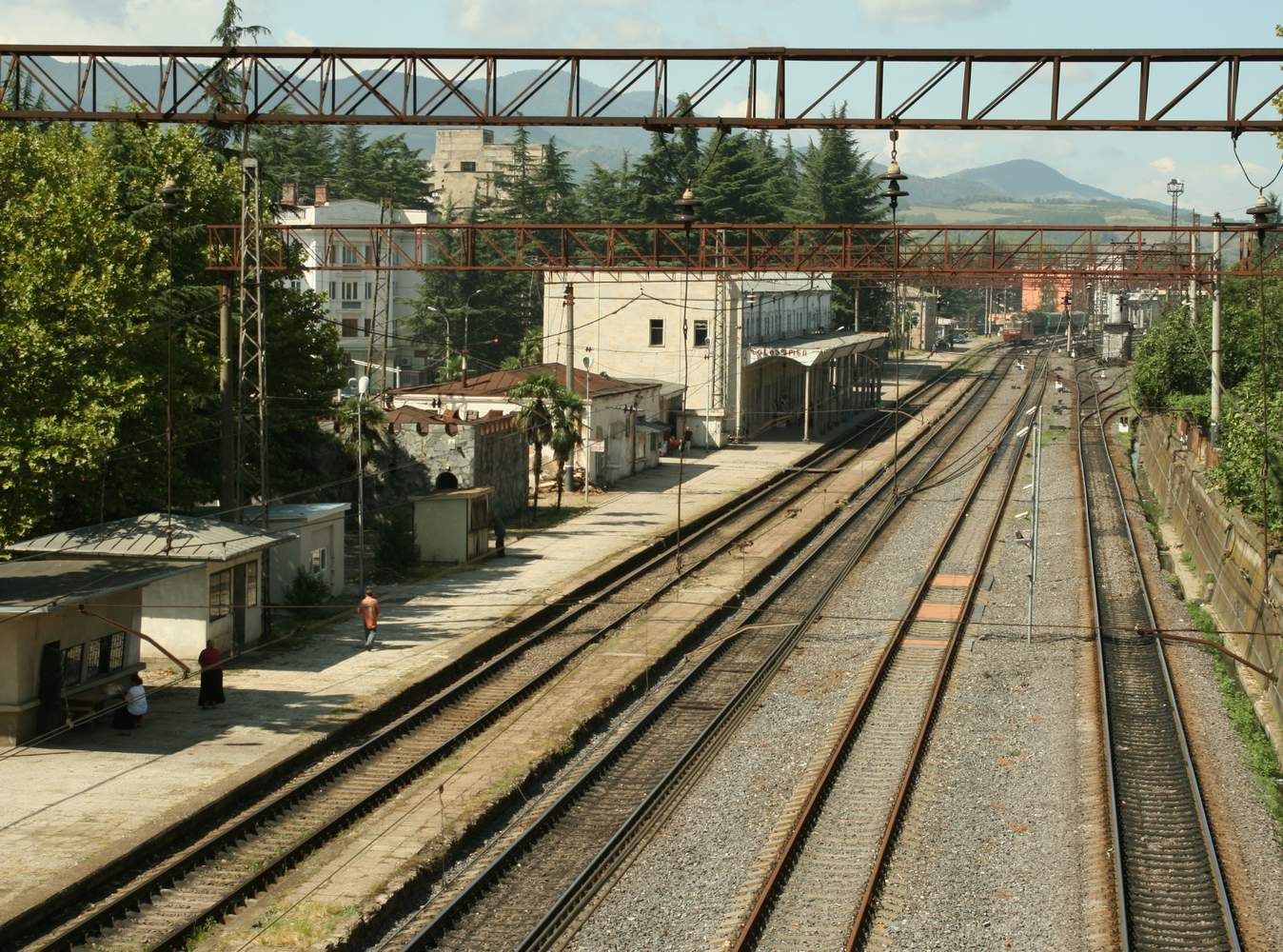
Zestaponi railway station

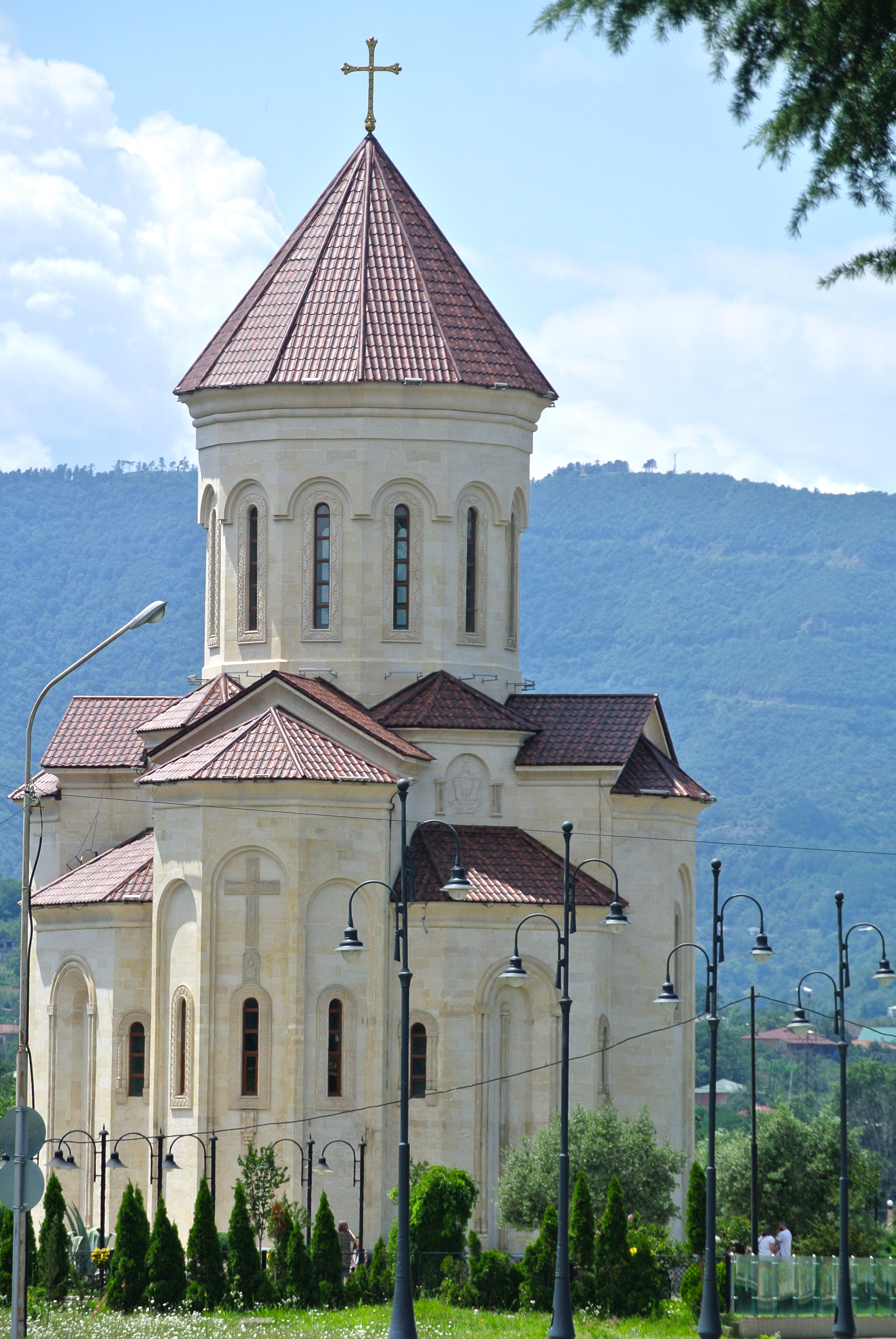
Orthodox church in Zestaponi

== See also ==
- List of municipalities in Georgia (country)
