= Zeda Sakara =

Zeda Sakara ზედა საქარა
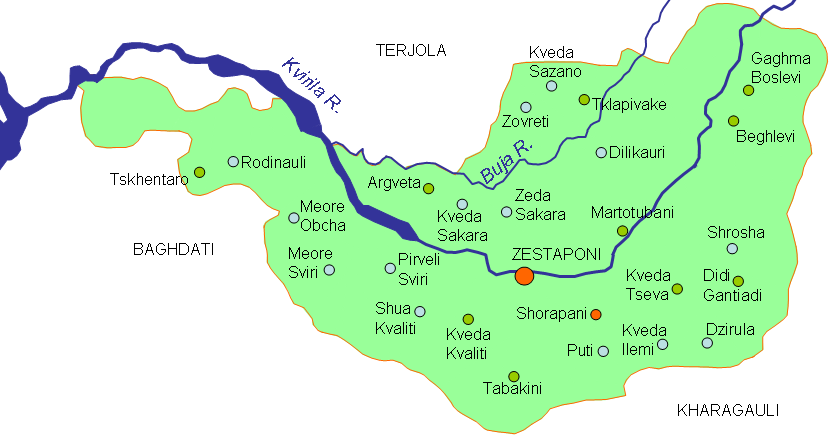
- Zestaponi region. Zeda Sakara is to the north of Zestaponi town

- Location of Zeda Sakara in Georgia
- Coordinates: 42°8′33″N 43°3′59″E
- Country: Georgia
- Mkhare: Imereti
- Municipality: Zestaponi Municipality
- Elevation: 980 ft (300 m)

Population (2014)
  - Total: 2,099
- Time zone: UTC+4 (Georgian Time)

Zeda Sakara (Georgian: ზედა საქარა) is a community in the west of Georgia, about 40 km to the southeast of Kutaisi at an elevation of about 264 m, in the Zestaponi District. The village is about 1 km to the east of Kveda Sakara.

The psychologist and philosopher Dimitri Uznadze was born in this village in 1886.

The Sakara Testing Station of Horticulture, established in 1932, had many varieties of apples and pears. There are also many varieties of local Georgian grapevine. The Sakara Viticulture and Winemaking Scientific-Research Station plays an important role in developing viticulture in the Zestaponi Region. There is tourist potential: Zeda Sakara has a castle that dates to the 11th century.

== See also ==
- Imereti
