= Mzia Todua =

Georgian lawyer and judge (born 1956)

- მზია თოდუა

President of the Supreme Court Acting
- In office 2 August 2018 – 17 March 2020
- President: Giorgi Margvelashvili; Salome Zourabichvili
- Prime Minister: Mamuka Bakhtadze; Giorgi Gakharia
- Preceded by: Nino Gvenetadze
- Succeeded by: Nino Kadagidze

Personal details
- Born: 24 January 1956 (age 70) Akhalsopeli, Georgia SSR, Soviet Union
- Education: Tbilisi State University

Mzia Todua (Georgian: მზია თოდუა; born 24 January 1956), is a Georgian lawyer and judge, acting President of the Supreme Court of Georgia between 2018 and 2020.

== Biography ==
Todua was born in the village of Akhalsopeli, now part of the Georgian administrative region of Samegrelo-Zemo Svaneti and graduated in Laws for the Tbilisi State University.

== Career ==
Between 1978 and 1979 was the legal consultant of the silk textile company "Khooni", and was the Head of the Registry Office of the Khoni Municipality since 1979 until 1985, when was named judge of the municipality's Court, being appointed the Head of this Court for 1991 until 1998. In 1998 entered in the Tbilisi Appeal Court, office she hold as a judge until 1999. She was also president of the Judges Conference of Georgia between 2003 and 2005.

Since 2008 is the Associate Professor at the Georgian-American University and since 2011 at the Caucasus University.

In 2015 is appointed magistrate, Vice-President of the Supreme Court and Chairperson of the Chamber of Civil Cases. On 2 August 2018, Nino Gvenetadze, the President of the High Court resigned and Mzia Todua, as the Deputy Chairperson took the office ad interim until the Parliament approves a new candidate.
