= Shorapani =

Shorapani შორაპანი
- Town
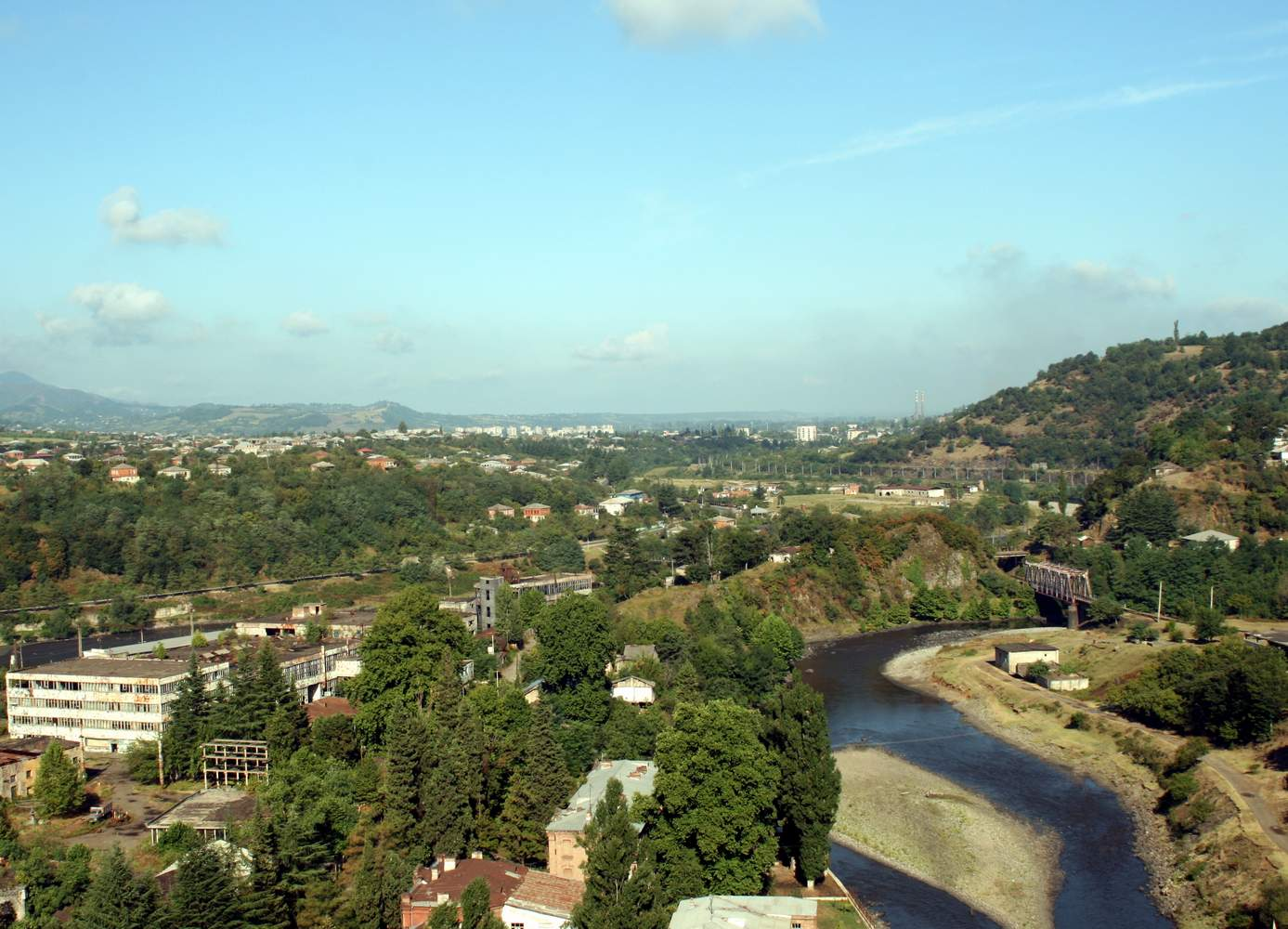
- View from Shorapani fortress

- Seal
- Interactive map of Shorapani
- Location of the town of Shorapani in Georgia Shorapani (Imereti)
- Coordinates: 42°05′44″N 43°04′55″E
- Country: Georgia
- Mkhare: Imereti
- District: Zestaponi District
- Elevation: 560 ft (170 m)

Population (2014)
  - Total: 1,258
- Time zone: UTC+4 (Georgian Standard Time)
- Climate: Cfa

Shorapani (Georgian: შორაპანი [ʃo̞ɾäpʼän̪i]) is a small Georgian town, situated in the Zestaponi District, part of the region of Imereti. Founded in the 3rd century BC, it served as a residence of the eristavi (dukes) of Argveti (also known as the Duchy of Shorapani) in the Antiquity and the early Middle Ages.

Near the town are the ruins of a fortress, mentioned as Sarapana by Strabo and Sarapanis by Procopius as a strong position on the road that led from Colchis to Iberia.

== Legends ==
Shorapani (Sarapanis) is the toponymy, that is mentioned in old Greek mythology. That was Sarapanis that Jason and his Argonaut friends approached during their travel in old Colchis (Kolkhida).

== See also ==
- Imereti
