= Puti, Georgia =

Puti ფუთი
- Location within Imereti Location within Georgia
- Coordinates: 42°04′18″N 43°05′41″E
- Country: Georgia
- Mkhare: Imereti
- Municipality: Zestaponi
- Elevation: 320 m (1,050 ft)

Population (2014)
  - Total: 1,564
- Time zone: UTC+4 (Georgian Time)

Puti (Georgian: ფუთი) is a village in the Zestaponi Municipality of Imereti in western Georgia.
