= Dimitri Uznadze =

Georgian psychologist

Bust of Uznadze at Tbilisi State University

Dimitri Uznadze (Georgian: დიმიტრი უზნაძე; December 20, 1886 – October 9, 1950) was a Georgian psychologist and professor of psychology, co-founder of the Tbilisi State University (TSU) and of the Georgian Academy of Sciences (GAS).

== Life and works ==
Dimitri Uznadze was born in 1886 to a peasant family, in the small village of Sakara in the province of Kutaisi (Western Georgia). He was expelled from Kutaisi high school for taking part in the 1905 revolution. That same year, Uznadze moved to Germany, where he began attending the University of Leipzig studying philosophy. Uznadze studied under Wilhelm Wunt (1832-1920) and soon became considered one of the best students and graduated in 1909. Shortly after graduating, Uznadze earned a PhD at the University of Wittenberg (Halle, Germany) for his work Vladimir Solovev: His Epistemology and Metaphysics (1909). After defending his dissertation, Uznadze returned to his home of Kutaisi, and began teaching within the community. Uznadze taught history at the local high school for boys, psychology and the history of education at the local high school for girls, and psychology and logic in the church secondary school for girls. Uznadze helped initiate the creation of a Sinatle girls’ school and became the headmaster of from 1915 to 1917.

After the October Revolution, Uznadze helped establish the Tbilisi State University (TSU). From 1918 to 1950, Uznadze was Professor and Head of the Department of Psychology of TSU.

In 1935, he received Dr.Sci. degree in Psychology. In 1941, Uznadze co-founded the Georgian Academy of Sciences (GAS). From 1941 to 1950, he was first Director of the Institute of Psychology of the GAS (now the Uznadze Institute of Psychology). In 1946, Uznadze received title of Meritorious Science Worker of Georgia.

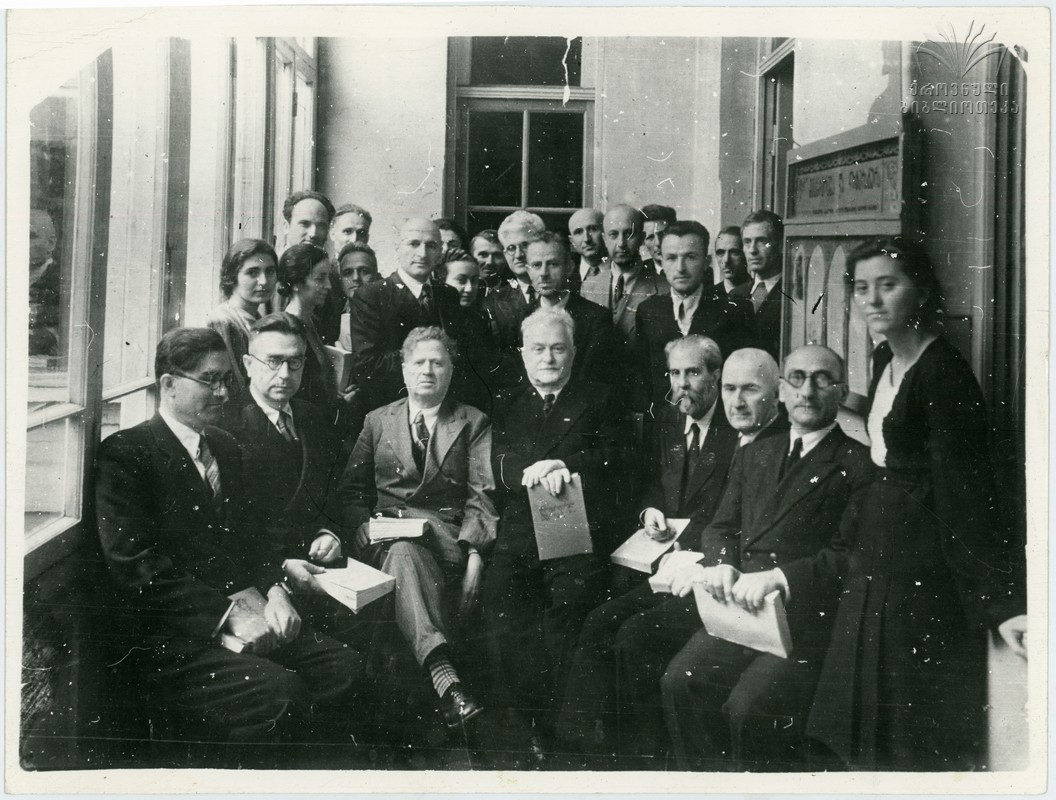
Conference at the Georgian Academy of Sciences, Uznadze sitting second from the right

The two main fields of scientific activity of Uznadze were philosophy and psychology. He was author of The Psychology of Set and founder of Georgian school of the psychology of pedagogics. Uznadze's main scientific works are: "Wladimir Solowjow: seine Erkenntnistheorie und Metaphysik" (a monograph, in German, Halle, 1910); "Henri Bergson" (a monograph, in Russian, Tbilisi, 1923); "Untersuchungen zur Psychologie der Einstellung" ("Acta Psychologica", Vol.IV, No.3, 1939, in German); "The Psychology of Set" (a monograph, in English, New York City, 1966); "Psychological Investigations" (In Russian, English summary, Moscow, 1966).

Uznadze died on October 9, 1950, in Tbilisi. He is buried in the garden of the Tbilisi State University.

== See also ==
- List of Georgians
- List of psychologists
