= High Council of Justice (Georgia) =

- საქართველოს იუსტიციის უმაღლესი საბჭო
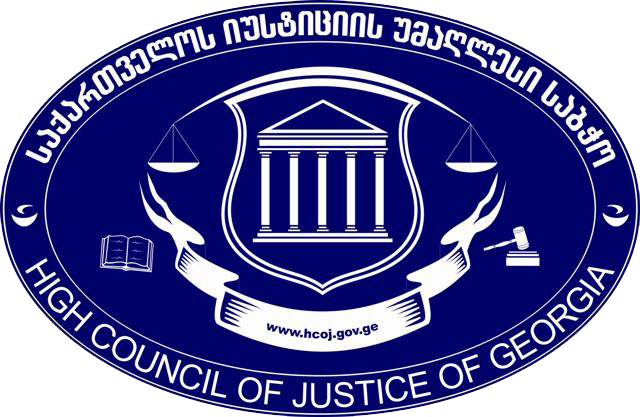
- Logo of HCoJ
- Established: 1997
- Jurisdiction: Georgia
- Location: Tbilisi
- Authorised by: Constitution of Georgia
- Number of positions: 14
- Website: www.hcoj.gov.ge

Chairwoman
- Currently: Nino Kadagidze

The High Council of Justice (Georgian: საქართველოს იუსტიციის უმაღლესი საბჭო, romanized: sakartvelos iust'itsiis umaghlesi sabch'o) is the supreme oversight body in charge of regulating the judiciary in Georgia. It was established on 13 June 1997.

The High Council of Justice is tasked with ensuring the independence and efficiency of the common courts, appointing and dismissing judges and performing other tasks defined by the law. As of the 2018 constitutional amendments, the Council consists of 14 members appointed for a term of 4 years and the Chairperson of the Supreme Court. More than half of the members are elected from among the judges by the self-governing body of judges of the common courts. In addition, one member is appointed by the President of Georgia and the remaining members are elected by a majority of at least three fifths of the total number of the Members of Parliament. The Chairperson of the High Council of Justice is elected for a 4-year term by the High Council of Justice from among its judge members.

As of 2025, the list of members of the High Council of Justice is

- Nino Kadagidze
- Nikoloz Marsagishvili
- Levan Murusidze
- Dimitri Gvritishvili
- Mikheil Chinchaladze
- Levan Nemsadze
- Levan Mikaberidze
- Irakli Bondarenko
- Vasil Mshvenieradze
- Levan Tevzadze
- Tristan Benashvili
- Giorgi Gzobava
- Zurab Guraspashvili
- Goga Kikilashvili
- Manucher Kakojashvili

as listed on its Georgian-language website.

== Criticism ==
The High Council of Justice has come under significant criticism, from 2020 onward. In May 2025, the German judge Ulrich Hagenloch, who had worked with the Georgian judiciary, suggested that the High Council of Justice needed to be dissolved, if the Georgian judiciary was to be saved.

In July 2025, an oped in Lithuania similarly argued that all members of the High Council of Justice should be sanctioned, in case the journalist Mzia Amaghlobeli received a high sentence for what was widely seen as a provoked incident, to ensure a "swift and certain" reaction to perceived participation of the judiciary in repression.
