= Supreme Court of Georgia (country) =

Highest court in the country of Georgia

- საქართველოს უზენაესი სასამართლო
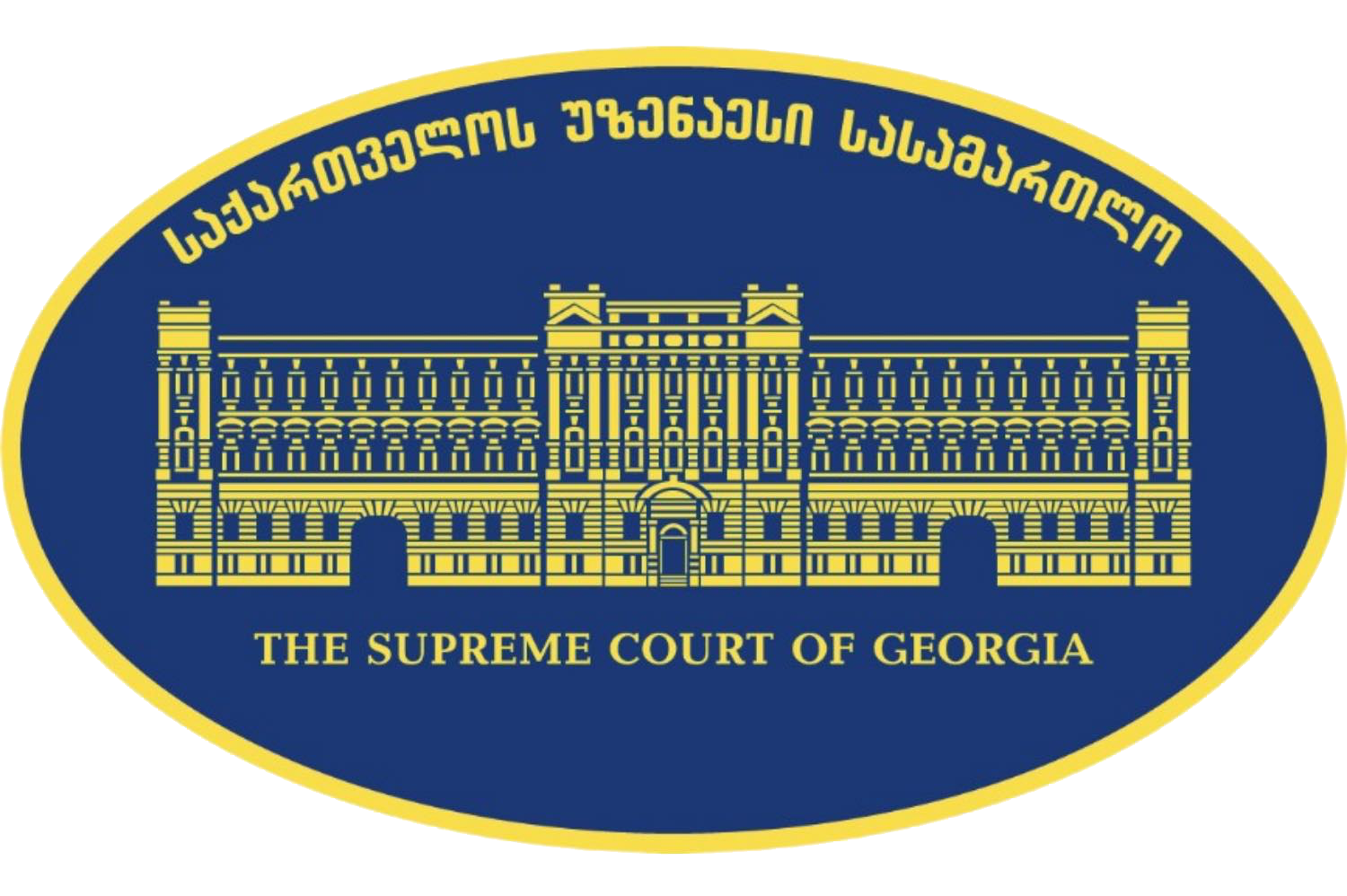
- Logo of the court
- 41.6988°N 44.7946°E
- Established: 2005; 20 years ago
- Location: Tbilisi, Georgia
- Coordinates: 41.6988°N 44.7946°E
- Composition method: High Council of Justice nomination with Parliament confirmation
- Authorised by: Constitution of Georgia
- Judge term length: No term limit (mandatory retirement at 65)
- Number of positions: ≥28
- Website: www.supremecourt.ge

Chairperson
- Currently: Nino Kadagidze
- Since: 17 May 2020; 4 years ago

The Supreme Court of Georgia (Georgian: საქართველოს უზენაესი სასამართლო, romanized: sakartvelos uzenaesi sasamartlo) represents the court of the highest and final administration of justice in the country. It was established in 2005 as the cassation instance court. It is located in Tbilisi, the capital of Georgia, in a building designed by Aleksander Szymkiewicz and built in 1894.

The Supreme Court oversees the administration of justice at common courts. Its activities are to be guided by the principles of legality, collective nature, publicity, equality of parties and competitiveness, as well as the irremovability, immunity and independence of judges.

The Supreme Court of Georgia considers claims on judgments made by the Courts of Appeal. It supports the introduction of the unified interpretation of the law and the establishment of common judicial practice.

Through the substantiated clarification and comparison of legal norms and by establishing court practice, the Court of Cassation is intended to ensure prompt and streamlined functioning of the judiciary.

== Structure, elections and appointments ==
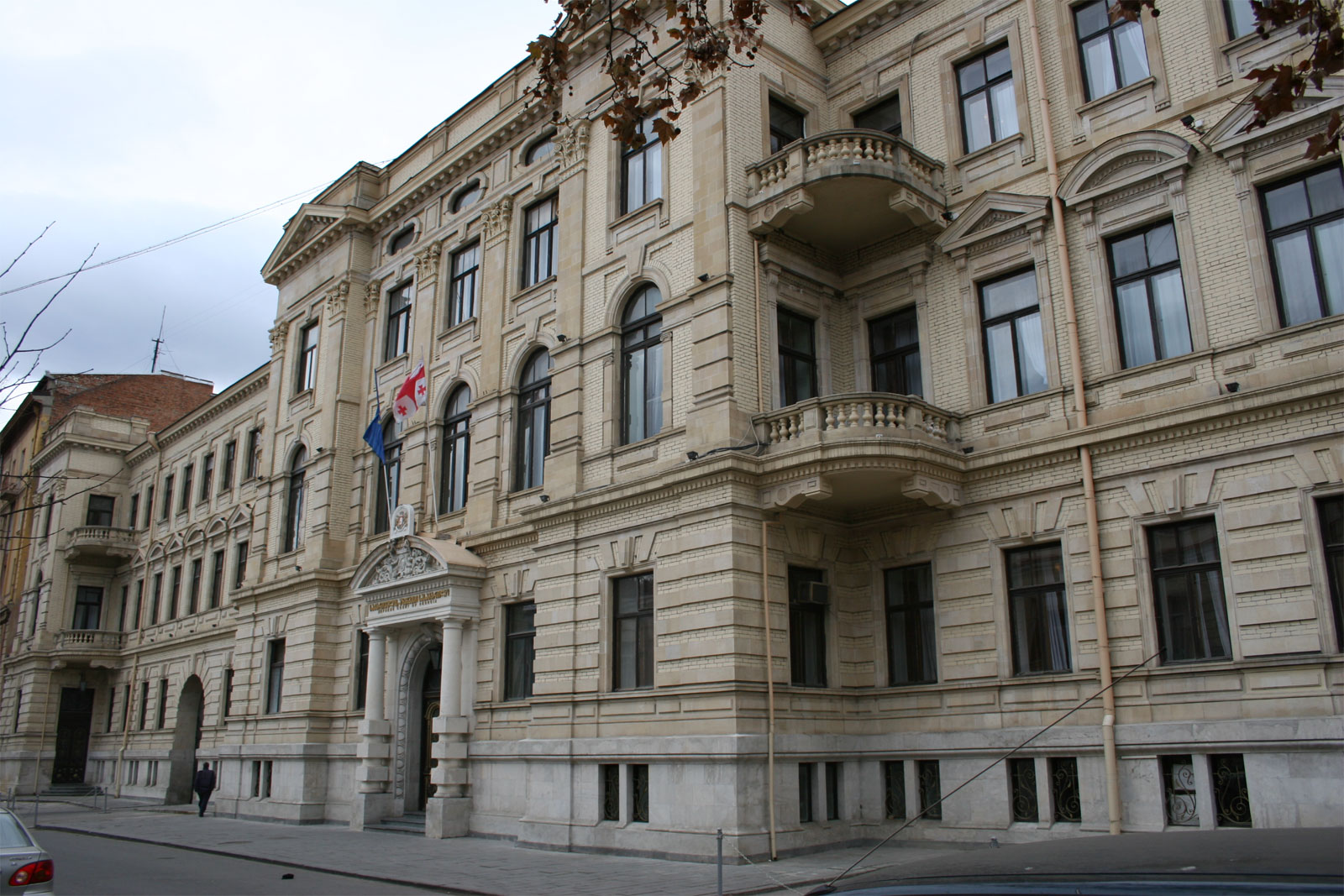
The Palace of Justice, a Supreme Court building in Tbilisi.

The Supreme Court consists of at least 28 judges. The judges of the Court are elected for a lifetime term by a majority of the Parliament from the nominal list as submitted by the High Council of Justice. The Chairperson of the Supreme Court is also elected by the Parliament upon nomination by the High Council of Justice for a term of 10 years. A person who has already held the position cannot be re-elected.

A judge enjoys immunity. Criminal proceedings against a judge, their arrest or detention, and searches of their place of residence, place of work, vehicle or person are permitted only with the consent of the High Council of Justice unless a judge is caught at the crime scene. Unless the High Council of Justice consents to the detention, the detained judge must be released immediately.

The Supreme Court consists of several structural units:

- Chamber of Civil Cases
- Chamber of Administrative Cases
- Chamber of Criminal Cases
- Grand Chamber
- The Plenum
- Disciplinary Chamber
- Qualification Chamber.

== Duties of Chambers ==
The Chamber of the Supreme Court considers cassation claims on judgments of the Courts of Appeal determined by procedural law and other cases assigned within its jurisdiction as defined by the law and rules. A Disciplinary Chamber is established at the Supreme Court of Georgia, which reviews claims against the judgments made by the Disciplinary Panel of Judges of Common Courts of Georgia.

The Chamber considers cases collectively, in a panel of three judges. The judgments (decisions) of the Chamber of Cassation are final and may not be appealed.

A Grand Chamber consists of the Chairman of the Supreme Court, Chairmen of the Chambers and no less than 12 judges elected by the Plenum for the term of 2 years. The Grand Chamber is chaired by the Chairman of the Supreme Court, or a chairman of one of the Chambers of the Supreme Court, as assigned by him.

Article 16.3 of the Organic Law on Common Courts of Georgia states that the Chamber reviewing the case at the cassation level may transfer a case with motivated judgment to the Grand Chamber. The Grand Chamber with its 9 judges considers the most complex cases if:

- the case with its contents represents a rare legal problem;
- the hearing Chamber does not share the legal evaluation already made by either the Cassation Chamber or the Grand Chamber.

== Duties of Plenum ==
Article 18 defines the structure and functions of the Plenum. According to the law, the Plenum consists of the Chairman of the Supreme Court, First Deputy chairman, deputy chairmen, Judges of the Supreme Court and the Chairpersons of the Appellate Courts.

Activities of the Plenum are led by the Chairman of the Supreme Court of Georgia. The Plenum defines the number of judges of the Supreme Court and is authorized to resolve organizational and legal issues within its competence.

== Other activities ==
The Plenum of the Supreme Court approves the Regulation of the Staff of the Supreme Court proposed by the Chairman of the Supreme Court.

The structure of the staff and rules of its activities are determined by the Regulation. The aim of the staff is to ensure unimpeded court activities. The court staff is led by the Chairman of the Supreme Court. The Head of Staff, employees and other members of staff are appointed and dismissed by the Chairman of the Supreme Court.

The Staff follows the following structural units:

- Bureau of the chairman, which also includes Media and Public Relations
- Common Department, which consists of the Chambers and Secretariat of Disciplinary Collegium, Human Recourses and Citizens Relation Sector
- Court Practice Research and Generalization, which also includes Periodical Publications, Library Sector and Human Rights Center
- Court Statistics and Generalization
- Finance;
- Service of the Court Police (Mandaturi)

On behalf of the judiciary power, the Supreme Court maintains close and active cooperation with various international organizations, which make important contribution to the development and promotion of the Georgian justice.

Cooperation is carried out in system development, capacity building and public awareness, which from its side includes the promotion of the judiciary power and its certain institutes.

The Supreme Court is actively cooperating with German Technical Cooperation; United Nations Development Program, Norwegian Mission of Rule of Law Advisers to Georgia (NORLAG); United States Agency for International Development Council of Europe, US Department of Justice and European Commission program – EC / TAIEX.

Transparency and the principle of publicity represent important conditions for the success of judicial reform. A serious step was taken towards establishment of a transparent relationship between the court and the public, and an institute of Speaker Judges was activated at the Supreme Court as well as in the System of Common Courts. Speaker judges enable the court to inform the public. Comprehensive information is posted on the website of the Supreme Court concerning the judiciary system, reform strategy and fundamental rights and freedoms of citizens.

The Supreme Court proactively engages with students. Judiciary officials meet with students to discuss judicial reform and the role of the judiciary. The Supreme Court supports various type of public activities such as Olympiads for law students in form of moot court competitions.

Preparation of journalists working in the justice sphere is vital for proper communication with the public. The Supreme Court organizes workshops for journalists regarding the New Criminal Procedure Code of Georgia and prepares the "Court Guidebook" to inform journalists on procedural matters.

== Judicial Independence ==
In 2021, the OSCE reported, that the appointment procedure of the Supreme Court judges carried out by the Georgian Parliament lacked integrity and credibility, and lacked adequate safeguards.
