= Igor Svanidze =

Georgian neurohistologist (1926–2018)

- იგორ კონსტანტინეს ძე სვანიძე
- Born: 31 August 1926; Leningrad, Russian SFSR, Soviet Union
- Died: 30 January 2018 (aged 91); Tbilisi, Georgia
- Other name: I. K. Svanidze
- Education: Tbilisi State University (1951)
- Known for: Introducing nervous-tissue culture to Georgia
- Awards: Order of Honor; Honored Scientist of Georgia
- Scientific career
- Fields: Neurohistology, histochemistry, neurobiology
- Workplaces: Beritashvili Institute of Physiology; Tbilisi State University

Igor Konstantinovich Svanidze (Georgian: იგორ კონსტანტინეს ძე სვანიძე; 31 August 1926 – 30 January 2018), who published as I. K. Svanidze, was a Georgian neurohistologist and neurobiologist. He founded and headed the Laboratory of Neuromorphology at the Beritashvili Institute of Physiology in Tbilisi and taught cytology and histology at Tbilisi State University for more than four decades. He is credited with introducing the culture of nervous tissue to Georgia and was among the country's first researchers in neurohistochemistry, working together with Alexander Roitbak.

== Early life and education ==
Svanidze was born on 31 August 1926. He grew up in Tbilisi and studied at Tbilisi State University, graduating from the Department of Biology in 1951. He later received the degrees of Candidate of Sciences and Doctor of Biological Sciences.

== Career ==
Svanidze taught in the Department of Cytology, Histology and Embryology of the Faculty of Biology at Tbilisi State University from 1959 to 2006, where he lectured on cytology and pathological histology and gave a special course in pathological histology for master's students.

At the Institute of Physiology of the Academy of Sciences of the Georgian SSR, later named after Ivane Beritashvili, he founded a Laboratory of Histochemistry in 1967. He later founded and headed the institute's Laboratory of Neuromorphology. He continued research at the institute, by then the Ivane Beritashvili Center of Experimental Biomedicine, until his death.

Over his career he supervised several doctoral and candidate dissertations.

== Research ==
Svanidze's early work concerned quantitative changes in protein functional groups and nucleic acids in neurons and glial cells during development and under increased functional activity, the subject of his 1974 monograph on nucleic acids in the pyramidal cells of the cerebral cortex. He also identified monosynaptic pathways linking the retina to the visual cortex and other brain regions.

He introduced organotypic and dissociated cultures of nervous tissue to Georgia. Using these methods he studied neuromuscular connections and types of axon growth, the role of contacts between cells in protein synthesis, and the reconstruction in dissociated culture of a structure analogous to the claustrum. His 1981 monograph summarized this work.

Other research topics included the differentiation and repair of central nervous system (CNS) cells during ontogenesis and in disease, and the stimulation of recovery after CNS injury by pharmacological and physical factors. With the Centre of Experimental and Clinical Medicine of the Polish Academy of Sciences he studied changes in central nerve cells under acute hypoxia. He also studied the function of the cilia of ependymal cells lining the cerebral aqueduct, including the effects of weakened and strengthened magnetic fields on them.

In his later years Svanidze's laboratory studied the effects of prenatal exposure to ethanol and toluene on neurogenesis, metabolism and behavior in the limbic and motor systems of rats, and the protective effect of antioxidants. The work found that such exposure reduced the proliferation of ependymal stem cells and of progenitor cells in the dentate gyrus of offspring, disrupted neuronal and glial migration, and reduced exploratory activity, findings the group linked to fetal alcohol and toluene syndromes. His last project, funded by the Shota Rustaveli National Science Foundation from 2015 to 2018, examined the stimulating effect of low (hormetic) doses of ethanol on limbic neurogenesis.

== Honours and memberships ==
- Order of Honor
- Honored Scientist of Georgia
- Soros Foundation science prize (1993)
- Full member of the New York Academy of Sciences (1996)
- Member of the International Brain Research Organization, the Federation of European Neuroscience Societies and Sigma Xi

== Selected works ==
Svanidze was the author of more than 100 scientific papers, as well as monographs and textbooks.

=== Monographs ===
- Svanidze, I. K. (1974). Количественный анализ нуклеиновых кислот в пирамидных нейронах коры головного мозга [Quantitative Analysis of Nucleic Acids in Pyramidal Neurons of the Cerebral Cortex] (in Russian). Tbilisi: Metsniereba. p. 166.
- Svanidze, I. K. (1981). Некоторые аспекты культивирования нервной ткани [Some Aspects of Nervous Tissue Cultivation] (in Russian). Tbilisi: Metsniereba. p. 148.

=== Textbooks ===
- Svanidze, I. K. (1976). Руководство по культивированию нервной ткани [Manual for Cultivating Nerve Tissue] (in Russian).

=== Selected papers ===
The following papers are indexed in PubMed.

- Svanidze, I. K. (1957). "K sravnitel'noi gistologii slizistoi obolochki zhel'chnogo puzyria pozvonochnykh" [Comparative histology of the mucous membrane of the gallbladder in vertebrates]. Arkhiv Anatomii, Gistologii I Embriologii (in Russian). 34 (5): 74–79. PMID 13488790.
- Svanidze, I. K. (1964). "Strukturnye izmeneniia v zritel'nom analizatore belykh krys posle enukleatsii" [Structural changes in the visual analyzer in white rats following enucleation]. Doklady Akademii Nauk SSSR (in Russian). 158: 743–744. PMID 14256087.
- Svanidze, I. K.; Bregvadze, I. A. (1965). "Dinamika sul'fgidril'nykh grup v glial'nykh kletkakh zritel'noĭ kory v usloviiakh tkanevykh kul'tur" [The distribution of SH-groups in glial cells of the optic cortex under tissue culture conditions]. Tsitologiia (in Russian). 7 (5): 628–633. PMID 5872596.
- Svanidze, I. K. (1966). "O Fel'gen-polozhitel'nykh granulakh v tsitoplazme glial'nykh kletok, kul'tiviruemykh vne organizma" [On Feulgen-positive granules in the cytoplasm of glial cells cultured outside the organism]. Doklady Akademii Nauk SSSR (in Russian). 169 (4): 945–946.
- Svanidze, I. K.; Bregvadze, I. A. (1968). "Effect of neurotropic drugs on nucleic acid content of glial and nerve cells in tissue culture and on neuroglial motor activity". Neuroscience Translations. 2 (4): 977–984. doi:10.1007/BF01124750.
- Roitbak, A. I.; Svanidze, I. K.; Didimova, E. V. (1973). "Effect of potassium ions on the motility of cortical glia". Doklady Akademii Nauk SSSR. 211 (6): 1450–1452. PMID 4584492.
- Didimova, E. V.; Svanidze, I. K. (1972). "Rost i differentsirovka kletok neĭroglii kory golovnogo mozga na rannykh étapakh kul'tivirovaniia" [Growth and differentiation of neuroglial cells of the cerebral cortex at early stages of cultivation]. Tsitologiia (in Russian). 14 (10): 1279–1284. PMID 4637832.
- Svanidze, I. K.; Didimova, E. V. (1974). "Izuchenie dinamiki sukhogo vesa zhivykh glial'nykh kletok" [A change in the dynamics of the dry weight of live glial cells]. Tsitologiia (in Russian). 16 (2): 187–192. PMID 4478033.
- Didimova, E. V.; Svanidze, I. K.; Macharashvili, D. N. (1974). "Osobennosti mitoticheskogo deleniia makroglial'nykh kletok posle travmy kory golovnogo mozga" [Peculiarities of mitotic division of macroglial cells after injury of the cerebral cortex]. Arkhiv Anatomii, Gistologii I Embriologii (in Russian). 67 (11): 63–66. PMID 4441293.
- Svanidze, I. K.; Didimova, E. V. (1975). "Mezhkletochnye kontakty i sinkhronizatsiia kolebaniĭ sukhogo vesa glial'nykh kletok" [Intercellular contacts and the synchronization of fluctuations in the dry weight of glial cells]. Tsitologiia (in Russian). 17 (10): 1226–1228. PMID 1191401.
- Svanidze, I. K.; Didimova, E. V. (1977). "Vliianie strikhnina, morfina i serotonina na dinamiku sukhogo vesa kul'tiviruemykh glial'nykh kletok" [Effect of strychnine, morphine and serotonin on dry weight dynamics in cultivated glial cells]. Tsitologiia (in Russian). 19 (8): 882–887. PMID 919033.
- Svanidze, I. K.; Didimova, E. V.; Kakabadze, I. M. (1980). "Poluchenie kolonok tkani tsentral'noĭ nervnoĭ sistemy dlia tseleĭ kul'tivirovaniia" [Obtaining columns of central nervous system tissue for culture purposes]. Tsitologiia (in Russian). 22 (12): 1458–1459. PMID 7210185.
- Lazriev, I. L.; Svanidze, I. K.; Tsitsishvili, A. Sh.; Dzamoeva, E. I. (1980). "Ul'trastrukturnye osobennosti neĭronov i sinapsov golovnogo mozga pri tsirkuliatornoĭ gipoksii" [Ultrastructural characteristics of neurons and synapses in the cerebral cortex during circulatory hypoxia]. Tsitologiia (in Russian). 22 (2): 139–143.
- Didimova, E. V.; Svanidze, I. K. (1980). "Agregatsiia nervnykh i glial'nykh kletok mozzhechka kurinogo émbriona v dissotsiirovannykh kul'turakh" [Neural and glial cell aggregation of the chick embryo cerebellum in dissociated cultures]. Ontogenez (in Russian). 11 (5): 536–538. PMID 7003465.
- Svanidze, I. K.; Didimova, E. V. (9 September 1982). "Plane reconstruction of the structure of mesencephalic tectum from hen embryos in dissociated culture". Brain Research. 247 (1): 121–128. doi:10.1016/0006-8993(82)91034-4. PMID 7127108.
- Museridze, D. P.; Svanidze, I. K. (1982). "Osobennosti povedeniia nervnykh i myshechnykh kletok v smeshannykh kul'turakh skeletnoi myshtsy i spinnogo mozga kurinykh émbrionov" [Behavior characteristics of nerve and muscle cells in mixed cultures of chick embryo skeletal muscle and spinal cord]. Tsitologiia (in Russian). 24 (5): 610–612. PMID 7101460.
- Svanidze, I. K.; Didimova, E. V. (1983). "Razmnozhenie kletok v kul'ture éksplantov gippokampa" [Cell multiplication in a culture of hippocampal explants]. Tsitologiia (in Russian). 25 (3): 342–344. PMID 6679428.
- Museridze, D. P.; Tsaishvili, Ts. S.; Gigineishvili, Ts. V.; Svanidze, I. K. (1985). "Morfofunktsional'nye osobennosti neĭronov spinnogo mozga na rannikh étapakh kul'tivirovaniia" [Morphofunctional characteristics of spinal cord neurons in the early stages of cultivation]. Tsitologiia (in Russian). 27 (12): 1407–1410. PMID 4089965.
- Bregvadze, I. A.; Gigineishvili, Ts. V.; Tsaishvili, Ts. S.; Svanidze, I. K. (1986). "Morfofunktsional'nye osobennosti kletok prozrachnoĭ peregorodki v tkanevoĭ kul'ture u novorozhdennykh krys" [Morpho-functional characteristics of septum pellucidum cells in a tissue culture in newborn rats]. Ontogenez (in Russian). 17 (2): 207–212. PMID 3703474.
- Didimova, E. V.; Svanidze, I. K. (1988). "Sokratitel'naia aktivnost' i prizhiznennye kolebaniia sukhogo vesa glial'nykh kletok v odnosloĭnykh kul'turakh" [Contractile activity and intravital fluctuations in the dry weight of glial cells in monolayer cultures]. Ontogenez (in Russian). 19 (5): 487–490.
- Museridze, D. P.; Svanidze, I. K.; Sikharulidze, N. V. (1989). "Studies of dry weight of cortical neurons under conditions of osmotic brain edema development in rabbits". Neuropatologia Polska. 27 (1): 77–84. PMID 2586797.
- Svanidze, I. K.; Museridze, D. P. (1990). "Rost aksonov v organotipicheskoĭ kul'ture spinnogo mozga" [Growth of the axons in organotypic culture of the spinal cord]. Biulleten' Eksperimental'noi Biologii I Meditsiny (in Russian). 109 (2): 186–188. PMID 2337660.
- Svanidze, I. K.; Museridze, D. P.; Gegenava, L. G. (1991). "Osobennosti agregatsii kletok kryshi srednego mozga émbrionov kur i kory golovnogo mozga novorozhdennykh krys v smeshannykh kul'turakh" [The characteristics of the cell aggregation of the tectum mesencephali in chick embryos and of the cerebral cortex in newborn rats in mixed cultures]. Tsitologiia (in Russian). 33 (10): 94–98. PMID 1814036.
- Svanidze, I. K.; Museridze, D. P. (1993). "Stimulation of the growth and differentiation of axons and dendrites of the spinal neurons in tissue culture". Bulletin of Experimental Biology and Medicine. 116 (6): 1561–1564. doi:10.1007/BF00785501.
- Svanidze, I. K.; Sandodze, V. Ya.; Didimova, E. V.; Chkhikvadze, T. I.; Portnoi, V. N.; Razdol'skii, A. S. (1994). "Izuchenie vliianiia gipo- i gipermagnitnogo poleĭ na dvigatel'nuiu aktivnost' resnitchatogo apparata épendimnykh kletok" [The effect of hypo- and hypermagnetic fields on the motor activity of the ciliary apparatus of the ependymal cells]. Radiatsionnaia Biologiia, Radioecologiia (in Russian). 34 (1): 100–104. PMID 8148963.
- Sandodze, V. Ya.; Svanidze, I. K.; Didimova, E. V. (1995). "Effekty vliianiia gipomagnitnogo polia na dvigatel'nuiu aktivnost' resnitchatogo apparata épendimnykh kletok v usloviiakh tselogo organizma" [Effects of hypomagnetic fields on motility of the cilia of ependymal cells in vivo]. Radiatsionnaia Biologiia, Radioecologiia (in Russian). 35 (1): 19–22. PMID 7719425.
- Svanidze, I. K.; Tsaishvili, Ts. S.; Kokaia, Z. G.; Godziashvili, S. B.; Kokaia, M. G. (1997). "Differentsirovka neĭronov golubovatogo mesta posle ikh allotransplantatsii v predvaritel'no denervirovannyĭ gippokamp belykh krys" [The differentiation of locus coeruleus neurons after their allotransplantation into the preliminarily denervated hippocampus of white rats]. Morfologiia (in Russian). 111 (2): 35–39. PMID 9244545.
- Svanidze, I. K.; Didimova, E. V.; Tsaishvili, Ts. S. (2001). "Proliferativnaia aktivnost' matrichnykh kletok bokovykh zheludochkov i granuliarnykh kletok zubchatoĭ izviliny gippokampa krys v usloviiakh pre- i postnatal'noĭ alkogol'noĭ intoksikatsii" [Proliferative activity of the matrix cells in lateral ventricles and granule cells in the dentate gyrus of the hippocampus in rats after pre- and postnatal alcoholic intoxication]. Izvestiia Akademii Nauk. Seriia Biologicheskaia (in Russian) (1): 117–120.
- Museridze, D. P.; Sanikidze, T. V.; Svanidze, I. K. (2006). "Metabolic activity of cells in brain cortex after alcohol intoxication and correction of changes with Dolivin". Bulletin of Experimental Biology and Medicine. 142 (3): 283–285. doi:10.1007/s10517-006-0347-1. PMID 17426830.
- Svanidze, I. K.; Museridze, D. P.; Didimova, E. V.; Gvinadze, N. N.; Gegenava, L. G.; Bregvadze, I. A. (2007). Izvestiia Akademii Nauk. Seriia Biologicheskaia (in Russian) (3): 325–328.
- Davitashvili, D. T.; Museridze, D. P.; Svanidze, I. K.; Gegenava, L. G.; Sanikidze, T. V. (2009). Georgian Medical News (177): 73–77.
- Davitashvili, D. T.; Museridze, D. P.; Svanidze, I. K.; Pavliashvili, N. S.; Sanikidze, T. V. (2010). Georgian Medical News (180): 56–60.
- Svanidze, I. K.; Museridze, D. P.; Didimova, E. V.; Sanikidze, T. V.; Gegenava, L. G.; Gvinadze, N. N. (2012). "Disorders of neurogenesis of cortical and subcortical structures in rat brain limbic system during fetal alcohol syndrome formation". Morfologiia (in Russian). 141 (2): 18–22. PMID 22913132.
