= Geology of Georgia (country) =

The geology of Georgia is dominated by the Caucasus Mountains at the junction of the Eurasian Plate and the Afro-Arabian Plate, and rock units from the Mesozoic and Cenozoic are particularly prevalent. For much of its geologic history, until the uplift of the Caucasus, Georgia was submerged by marine transgression events. Geologic research for 150 years by Georgian and Russian geologists has shed significant light on the region and since the 1970s has been augmented with the understanding of plate tectonics.

== Stratigraphy and tectonics ==
The Georgian Block in the Dzirula Massif is part of the Main Range zone of the Greater Caucasus and the Lesser Caucasus fold system. The south slope of the Greater Caucasus has exposed Paleozoic rocks in the Svaneti Zone, including black shale, phthanite chert, sandstones, turbidites, small amounts of marble and andesite or dacite volcanic rocks. These rocks, which belong to the Dizi Series are up to two kilometers thick and date to the Devonian, Carboniferous and Permian. Weakly metamorphosed Paleozoic sedimentary rocks are also found in the Dzirula Massif—namely, allochthon phyllite that contact Paleozoic granitoids and Precambrian gabbro, amphibolite and serpentinite.

Late Carboniferous and Early Permian conglomerate, sandstone, limestone and argillite are identified by marine fossils. The Dzirula and Khrami massifs contain rhyolite and coal-bearing argillite.

=== Mesozoic (251-66 million years ago) ===
Triassic sediments such as quartz sandstone and siltstone, together with dacite and rhyolite are part of the Dizi Series, with thicknesses of 80 to 500 meters. Jurassic black shales, sandstone, turbidite and rhyolite sequences are up to five kilometers thick. In the Late Jurassic, limestone and marl formed in a shallow marine environment, with alternating layers of basalt-andesite-dacite volcanic rocks exposed on the western edge of the Khrami Massif and in the Lock-Karabakh Zone.

The Early Cretaceous is marked by clastic limestone and greywacke siltstone flysch 750 meters to 1.6 kilometers thick in the Mestia-Tianeti flysch zone. Within the Georgian Block, the crystalline rocks of the Dzirula Massif are overlain by Early Cretaceous rocks 300 to 550 meters thick, primarily limestone but also glauconite sandstone, marl and clay. Elsewhere in the Adjara-Trialeti Zone, calc-alkaline basalt from the Albian is common. Within the Arthvin-Bolsini Block is a 1.2 kilometer sequence of carbonates, shallow water limestones and marl as well as tuff.

=== Cenozoic (66 million years ago-present) ===
In the Cenozoic, greywacke and siltstone flysch, 600 to 850 meters thick, deposited during the Paleocene and Eocene. In the Georgian Block, limestone and marl from this period ranges between 30 and 400 meters thick. Turbidite, and both tholeiite and shoshonite basalt deposited during a Middle Eocene event, up to five kilometers thick. In the Locki Crystalline Massif, basalt, andesite, dacite and rhyolite up to 2.7 kilometers thick overlaps older Cretaceous and Jurassic rocks.

Marl, clay and gravel are hallmarks of the Late Eocene in the Adjara-Trialeti Zone, grading to volcanic rocks in the west. Throughout the Oligocene, layers of gypsum bearing clays intermingled with sandstone and accumulated fish scales. This sequence continued to deposit into the Miocene and is exposed in the Gagra-Djava Zone. Marine molasse deposits with clays, sandstones, conglomerates, limestone and marl were laid down during the Miocene. River terraces, glacial moraines and volcanic rocks from the last 2.5 million years of the Quaternary are present, but erratically distributed. Georgia experienced three periods of glaciation during the Pleistocene.

== Tectonics ==
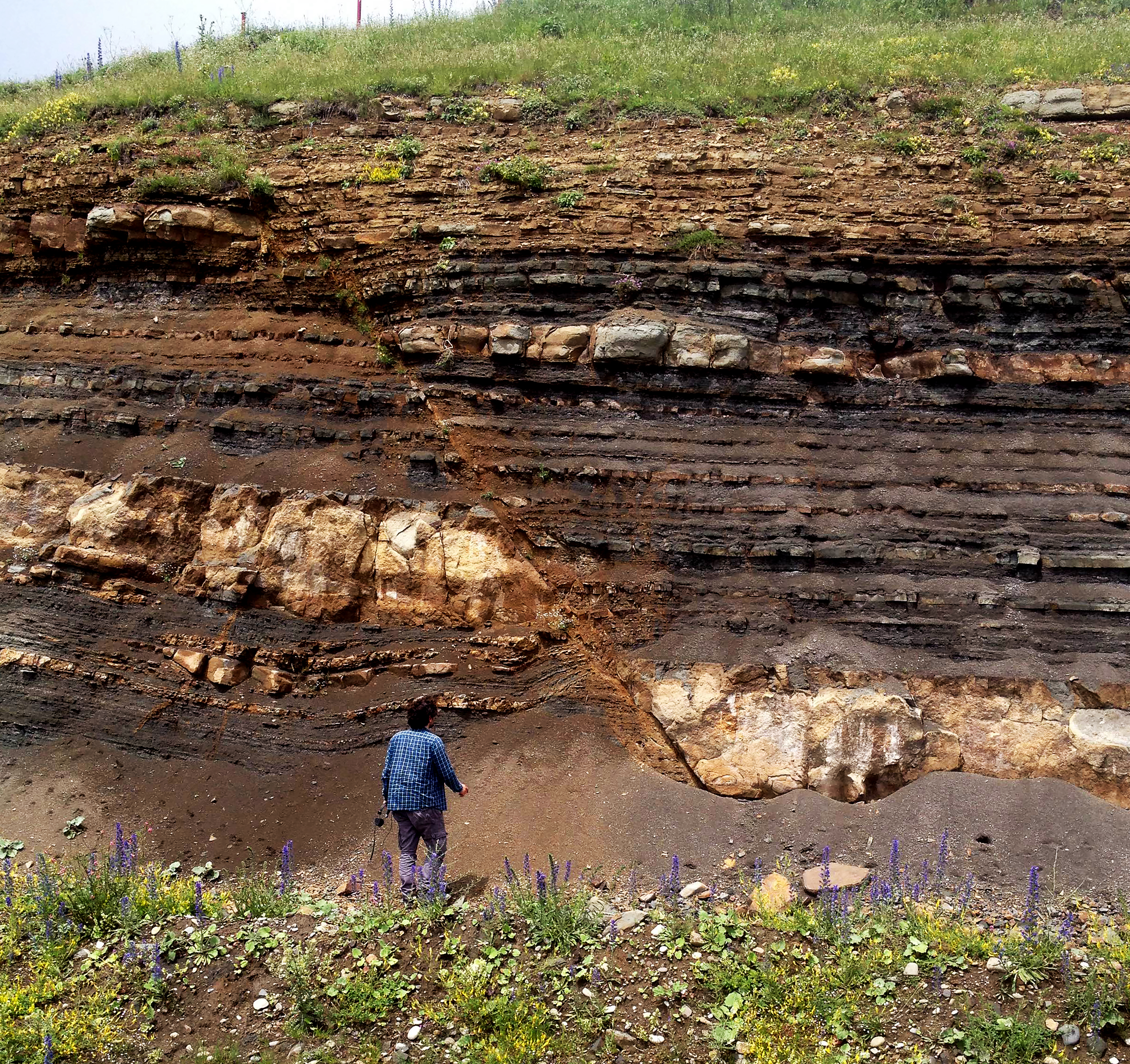
Layers of sedimentary rock cut by a normal fault (due to extension of the bedrock) near Tbilisi. Layers on the right have moved downwards relative to layers on the left.

Northeastern Georgia has asymmetric, isoclinal folding on the southern slope and poorly folded, or monoclinal structures on the northern slope of the Greater Caucasus. Nappe structures are directed toward the south and are evidence of the underthrusting of the Georgian Block beneath the Greater Caucasus. The northern boundary of the Georgian Block is a deep fault, that manifests in the sedimentary cover. To the east, the overlying sedimentary rocks are detached and shifted towards the south, along with the nappes.

The Adjara-Trialeti Zone of the Lesser Caucasus is situated south of the Georgian Block and is anticlinorium with block-fold structures. There is an overthrust nappe along the northern margin of this zone, to the west of the Dzirula Massif. The Artvini-Bolnisi Block has two tectonic units. The gently folded Cenozoic volcanic rocks of the Javakhen Zone contain two seismic faults, associated with lava tubes. The Bolnisi Zone has the Khrami salient horst, with steep folds south of the sedimentary cover. The northeast wedge of the Locki-Karabakh Zone is also situated in Georgia, with crystalline rock from before the Jurassic exposed in the Locki anticlinorium.

== Natural resource geology ==
Georgia has deposits of iron and manganese ore, as well as rare, small deposits of copper, lead, zinc, tin, cobalt, astatine, and molybdenum. Oil, coal and peat deposits are found in some parts of the country. Barite, calcite, bentonite, diatomite, talc, zeolite, andesite, limestone, dolomite are all used in the chemical industry and some rocks, like chalcedony, spongolite and agate are used for building stones and paint.

== Alexandre Janelidze Institute of Geology ==
In 1925 city of Tbilisi was established Geological research Institute, where many famous geologists worked in, included Alexander Janelidze, Alexander Tvalchrelidze, Kalistrate Gabunia, Ivane Kacharava, Ivane Kakhadze, Savle Chikhelidze, Petre Gamkrelidze, Giorgi Dzotsenidze, Archil Tsagareli, Giorgi Tvalchrelidze, Nikoloz Skhirtladze, Erekle Gamkrelidze and other.
