= Nikolos Landia =

- Born: January 26, 1919; Kutaisi
- Died: February 25, 1984 (aged 65)

Nikolos Aleksandrovich Landia (January 26, 1919, Kutaisi – February 25, 1984) was a Soviet scientist in inorganic chemistry and physical chemistry.

Academician of the Academy of Sciences of the Georgian SSR (1974-1984).

== Biography ==
Nikolos Landia graduated from the Georgian Polytechnic Institute (1940), and then worked there in 1945-1960.

In 1960-1972 - Director of the Institute of Inorganic Chemistry and Electrochemistry of the Academy of Sciences of the Georgian SSR.

In 1972-1981 - Academician-Secretary of the Academy of Sciences of the Georgian SSR.

In 1981-1984 - Vice-President of the Academy of Sciences of the Georgian SSR.

== Science contribution ==
Nikolos Landia's main works are devoted to chemical thermodynamics. In 1945, he developed a new method for obtaining calcined and caustic soda from sodium sulfate, coal and water vapour. In 1946-1962, he defined the thermodynamic characteristics of a number of inorganic compounds and chemical processes. He created a method for accurate calculation of the high-temperature heat capacity of solid inorganic compounds, widely used in thermodynamic studies of high-temperature metallurgical processes, silicate technology, and inorganic technology. Since 1961, he developed research on experimental thermodynamics, achieving high accuracy results. In 1965-1979, he studied the high-temperature enthalpy and heat capacity of many individual ferrites and their solid solutions. He experimentally measured the heats of transformations (including magnetic ones) in the immediate vicinity of the transition points. He established the relationship between the composition and properties, as well as between the magnetic and thermal properties of ferrites.

== Awards ==
- Order of the Red Banner of Labour
- Order of Friendship of Peoples
- Order of the Badge of Honour.
