= Elguja =

Elguja (Georgian: ელგუჯა) is a Georgian masculine given name that may refer to the following notable people:

- Elguja Amashukeli (1928–2002), Georgian sculptor and painter
- Elguja Burduli (1941–2022), Soviet and Georgian film actor
- Elguja Gugushvili (born 1946), Georgian football manager and former player
- Elguja Gvazava (born 1952), Georgian politician
- Elguja Khintibidze (born 1937), Georgian philologist
- Elguja Lobjanidze (born 1992), Georgian football player
- Elguja Medzmariashvili (born 1946), Georgian scientist and military figure
