= Geology of Georgia =

Geology of Georgia may refer to:

- Geology of Georgia (U.S. state)
- Geology of Georgia (country)
