= Alexander I. Roitbak =

Soviet and Georgian physiologist

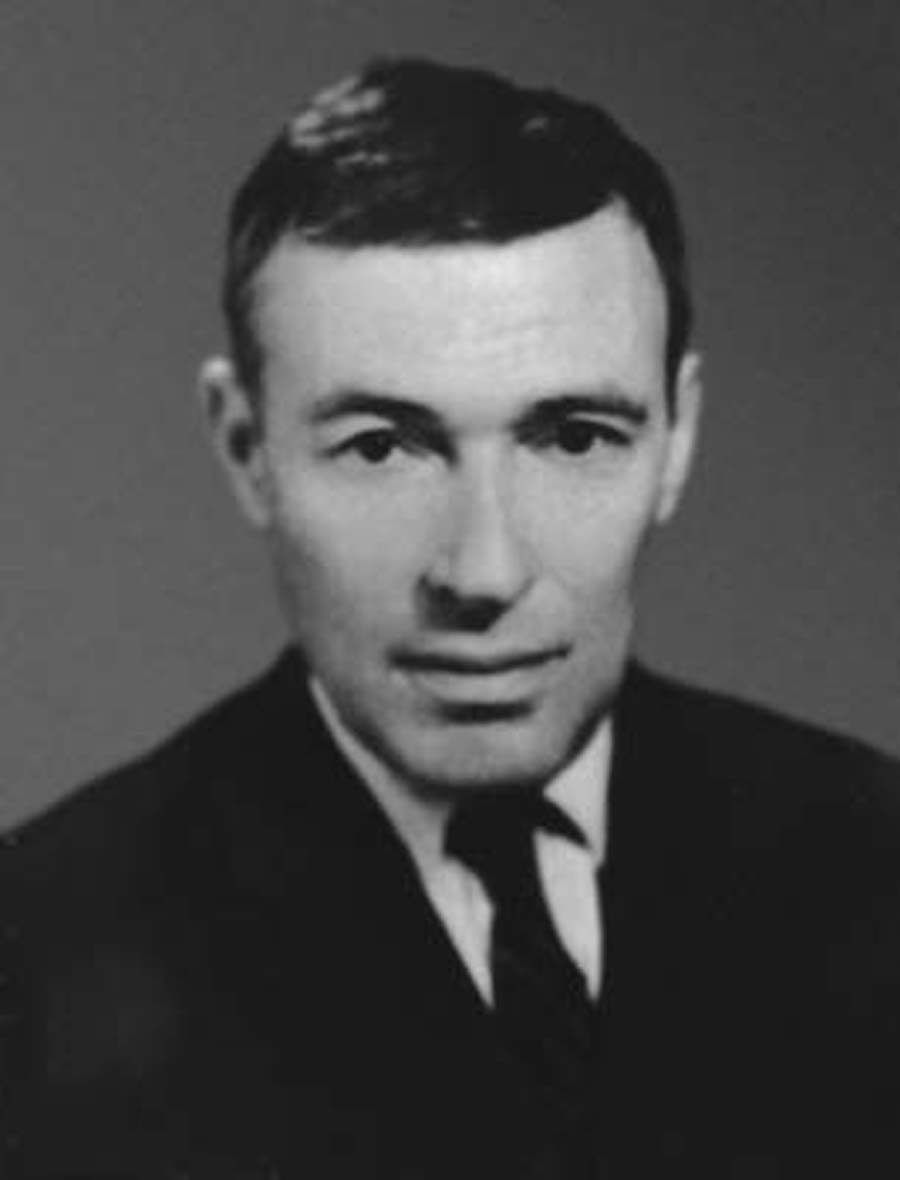
A. I. Roitbak

Alexander Illich Roitbak (February 17, 1919, Odessa — December 24, 1991, Tbilisi) was a Soviet and Georgian physiologist. Member of the Academy of Sciences of the USSR (1968) and the International Brain Research Organization.

== Biography ==
A. I. Roitbak graduated from the Kiev Medical Institute in 1941. In 1944 he joined the staff in the Institute of Physiology of the Georgian Academy of Sciences in Tbilisi under its founder and first director, Professor Ivane Beritashvili. He earned his first research degree under Beritashvili's direction, and remained his collaborator and friend for life. In 1960 he became head of the Laboratory of General Cerebral Cortex Physiology. Roitbak and his wife, Ciala Dedabrishvili, a fellow physiologist, had two daughters, Maria and Tamara.

Roitbak's principal works are focused on neurophysiology. He is one of the pioneers of electrophysiological investigation of the central nervous system, and considered the first neurophysiologist in the Soviet Union to investigate electrical potentials of the cerebral cortex during its direct electrical stimulation. Roitbak discovered that by rhythmically stimulating the cortex of the large hemispheres it is possible to create a focus of excitation, or a dominant. In recordings of field potentials he recognized that the dendritic potential evoked by direct cortical stimulation corresponded to the EPSP generated by apical dendrites. Later research areas included the relationship of sustained potential shifts, potassium levels, and glial potentials. Roitbak proposed a hypothesis on the role of neuroglia in the formation of the temporary connections that are the basis of conditioned reflexes.

The list of publications of A.I. Roitbak exceeds 260 titles. He organized scientific symposia on Slow Electrical Potentials of the Nervous System (1966), Mechanisms of Temporary Connections (1975), and Functions of Neuroglia (1976, 1984, 1989)

== Selected works ==
- Bioelektricheskie javleniia ν kore bol’shikh polusharii, part 1 - Tbilisi, 1955
- A New Hypothesis Concerning the Mechanism of Formation of the Conditioned Reflex - Acta Neurobiol. Exp. 30: 81-94, 1970
- Neirogliia i obrazovanie novykh nervnykh sviazei ν kore mozga - Mekhanizmy formirovaniia i tormozheniia uslovnykh refleksov. Moscow, 1973
- Neuroglia: Eigenschaften, Funktionen, Bedeutung - Fischer Verlag, Germany, 1983
- S. Beritashvili and his school in the critical period of 1948-1953 - Fiziol Zh SSSR Im I M Sechenova. Dec;76(12):1806-15, 1990
- Slow Potential Changes in the Brain - Bikhauser Verlag, Germany, 1992
- Glia and its Role in Nervous Function - Nauka, St. Petersburg, 1993
