= Beritashvili Institute of Physiology =

Georgian research institute

The Beritashvili Institute of Physiology of the Georgian Academy of Sciences, located in Tbilisi, Georgia, is one of the leading Georgian research institutes specializing in the fields of neurobiology, atomic force microscopy, molecular biology, biochemistry, and physiology. It was founded in 1935 by Soviet physiologist Ivan Beritashvili.
