= Janelidze =

Janelidze, Djanelidze or Dzhanelidze (Georgian: ჯანელიძე) is a Georgian surname that may refer to the following people:

- Alexander Janelidze (1888–1975), Georgian geologist and statesman
- Davit Janelidze (born 1973), Georgian football player
- Giorgi Janelidze (born 1989), Georgian football midfielder
- Mikheil Janelidze (born 1981), former Vice Prime Minister of Georgia
- Mindia Janelidze (born 1978), Georgian Minister of Defense
- Nana Janelidze (born 1955), Georgian film director and screenwriter
- Yustin Djanelidze (1883–1950), Soviet cardiac surgeon pioneer
