= Elguja Medzmariashvili =

Georgian scientist and major-general

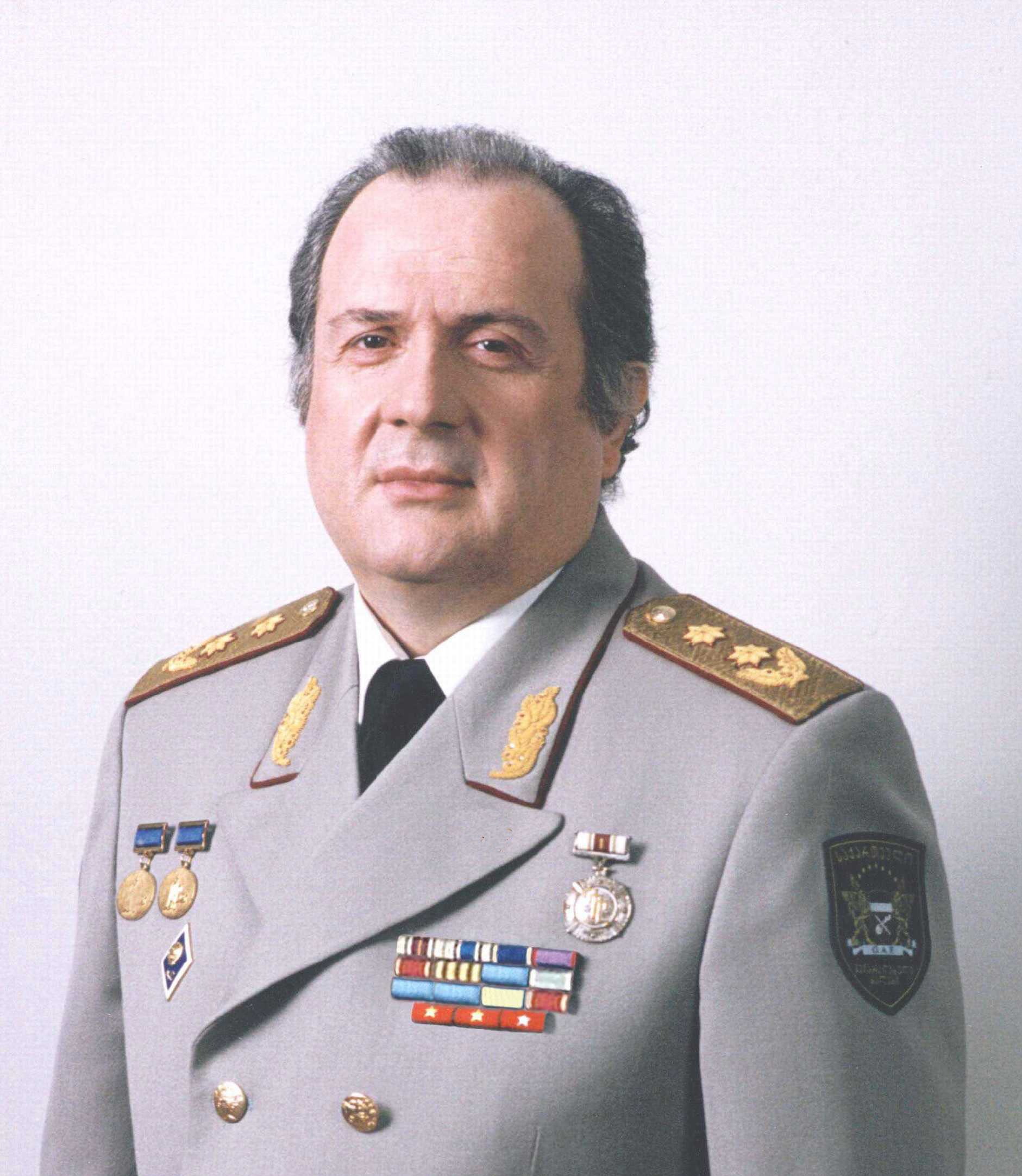
- Major-General Elguja Medzmarishvili
- Born: Elguja medzmariashvili 17 August 1946 (age 79); Batumi, Georgia
- Known for: General Constructor of the First Georgian Space Object
- Spouse: Manana Tkeshelashvili
- Awards: Vakhtang Gorgassali I degree Order (for developing space and military engineering technologies in Georgia and designing the first Georgian space satellite system). Order of Honor – for creating terrestrial test bench complex for space systems in Georgia and for saving and retaining thereof under extreme conditions. Georgia State Prize laureate medal (achievements in space mechanics). Medal for “Service in Battle” (Georgia). Medals of 9 local and international organizations.
- Scientific career
- Fields: space technology and mechanics Military engineering sciences Military technological sciences
- Institutions: Georgian Technical University; Institute of Constructions, Special Systems and Engineering Maintenance

Elguja Viktoris dze Medzmariashvili (Georgian: ელგუჯა ვიქტორის ძე მეძმარიაშვილი; born August 17, 1946, in Batumi, Georgia), Georgian scientist and military figure, Doctor of Military Science, Doctor of Technical Science, Professor, Major-General, academician of the Georgian National Academy of Sciences. E. Medzmariashvili is General Constructor of the first Georgian space object launched into orbit on July 23, 1999, and, shifted to an independent orbit on July 28 after its deploying and testings. He established and developed the scientific, academic and applied areas in the fields of space technology and military engineering. He is a companion of the highest military state award – Vakhtang Gorgassali I degree order.

== Biography ==
In 1964, he graduated from Batumi first high school with gold medal.

In 1969, graduated from the Georgian Technical University Department of Civil Engineering, and went through the course of post graduate study in the field of spatial constructions in 1972.

Since 1973 to present he has been working in Georgian Technical University. He was a head of the Civil Engineering Constructions Department in 1985–1995, and then, in 1995–2004, the head of the special constructions department founded by himself. Currently he is a full professor in the Georgian Technical University.

In 1979 he established the Georgian Institute of Space Constructions whereat he holds the post of the general constructor and general director. There are numerous space and terrestrial military engineering complexes and constructions developed in the institute.

In 1978–1989, being the chief of Tbilisi branch of the Moscow Central Scientific-industrial Corporation KOMETA and general constructor of its military space technology, Elguja Medzmariashvili, due to the state commission decision and for coping with a special task, was cooperating with the scientific technical committee of the engineer corps of the Ministry of Defense, facultyies of the general staff and military engineering academy, Korolev Rocket Space Corporation ENERGY, Khrunichev Rocket Building Factory, Moscow mechanics problems and aviation institutes as well as special scientific institutions, universities and institutes in Dnepropetrocsk, Siktivkar, Dubna, Nakhabino, Podlipsk, Kharkov and other cities.

Since 1995 to present, being the research manager and direct member of the working group, he has been fulfilling the orders of the German company “Daimler-Benz Aerospace” - "Dornier-Satelliten systeme, Italian company Alenia Aerospazio, Munich technical University Institute of lightweight Constructions (LLB, Technical University of Munich) and European Space Agency (ESA).

On July 23, 1999, the first Georgian space object was launched into orbit, which, after successful deployment and testings, was shifted from the orbital station to an independent satellite orbit. Elguja Medzmariashvili is the general constructor of the first Georgian space object.

In 1999-2002 he was an adviser to the defense minister of Georgia in the field of engineering support of troops.

In 1999-2004 he was elected member of the Georgian parliament wherein he initially held the industry subcommittee chief's post and then the posts of parliamentary group chief and parliamentary thematic majority leader.

In 2000 he established the military Engineering Academy of the general staff of the Georgian armed forces, where he held the post of the academy President.

In 2006, in result of reorganization of the Georgian Space Constructions Institute and Military Engineering Academy of general staff of Georgian armed forces, the Institute of Constructions, Special Systems and Engineering Maintenance of Georgian Technical University was established on his own initiative, where Elguja Medzmariashvili is still holding the posts of the general constructor and president of the scientific council.

He has published more than 250 scientific works, including monographs, manuals, articles, and inventions.

Elguja Medzmariashvili is the creator of the transformable engineering systems theory and unique transformable military and civil, space and terrestrial deployable complexes. He established the scientific, technical and academic base of development of the military engineering field in Georgia.

He has a spouse and four children.

== Honours and prizes ==
Vakhtang Gorgassali I degree Order (for developing space and military engineering technologies in Georgia and designing the first Georgian space satellite system).

Order of Honor – for creating terrestrial test bench complex for space systems in Georgia and for saving and retaining thereof under extreme conditions.

Medal "For Labour Valour"

Georgia State Prize laureate medal (achievements in space mechanics).

Medal for “Service in Battle” (Georgia).

Medals of 9 local and international organizations.

== Academic degree ==
- Doctor of Military Science
- Doctor of Technical Science

== Academic status ==
Member of the National Academy of Sciences of Georgia; Professor

== Notes ==
NOTES:

1. Decree of August 20, 1986 of the USSR Supreme Council Presidium.

2. Decree No. 615 of the President of Georgia dated on September 18, 1996.

3. Decision of 1996 of Georgian Committee of State Prizes in the field of Science and Technology, existing at the President of Georgia.

4. Decree No. 896 of the President of Georgia dated on July 26, 1999.

5. Decree No. 674 of the President of Georgia dated on May 25, 2002.

== Citations ==
- MEDZMARIASHVILI ELGUJA. V. – Who's Who in Science and Engineering, 2006–2007; 2008–2009. MARQUIS WHO'S WHO PUBLICATION. USA.
- MEDZMARIASHVILI ELGUJA. V. – Who's Who in the World, 2008- 2009. MARQUIS WHO'S WHO PUBLICATION. USA.
- MEDZMARIASHVILI ELGUJA. V. – IBC Foremost Engineers of the World – 2008. Cambridge, England.
- Who's Who in Georgia. "Bibliographic Directory". Tbilisi. 2010.

Tbilisi. Encyclopedia. "Georgian encyclopedia: Tbilisi 2002

- Generals from Georgia. Levan Dolidze. Three centuries messenger of the Georgian general officers. Tbilisi 2003.
