= Elguja Khintibidze =

Georgian philologist

- Born: June 7, 1937; Georgia
- Citizenship: Georgia
- Education: Tbilisi State University
- Scientific career
- Fields: Georgian literature
- Workplaces: Tbilisi State University
- Doctoral advisor: Korneli Kekelidze

Elguja Khintibidze (born June 7, 1937) is a Georgian philologist, Doctor of Philological Sciences; professor at Ivane Javakhishvili Tbilisi State University; academician of The Georgian National Academy of Sciences; Member of Société Internationale pour l'Étude de la Philosophie Médiévale – S.I.E.P.M.

== Biography ==
Khintibidze graduated from the Faculty of Philology at Tbilisi State University in 1960. At the moment he is head of the Institute of Georgian Literature at the Faculty of Humanities of TSU and president of the International Association for the Promotion of Georgian/Kartvelian Studies. He worked as Dean of the Faculty of Philology at TSU (1976–1986); deputy rector for scientific research at TSU (1986–1993) and head of the chair of old Georgian literature at TSU (2000–2006). The main field of Khintibidze's research is medieval Georgian literature and Georgian-Byzantine literary contacts, also especially Rustaveli studies and source studies. Khintibidze was editor of the journal Literary Research (Proceedings of Tbilisi University) (1976–2004); member of the editorial board of the journal Georgica (1978 →); founder and editor of the journal The Kartvelologist (Journal of Georgian Studies) (1993 →). Founder and head of the centre and the Fund for Kartvelian Studies (1992 →); founder of the programme of International Summer School in Kartvelian Studies (1995 →). Organiser and convener of six International Symposia on Kartvelian Studies. Participant in international congresses and symposia in medieval studies (SIEPM) and Byzantine studies and deliverer of lectures at a number of universities of the world. Author about of 220 scholarly publications and monographs.

Khintibidze studies the process of Georgian-Byzantine contacts and is the author of some theories on this field, namely :

(a) Establishment and argumentation of the standpoint of the Georgian origin of 4th century Cappadocians Holly Fathers – Basil the Great and Gregory of Nyssa.

(b) Argumentation of viewpoint of authorship of the Byzantine novel Barlaam and Ioasaph by Euthymius the Athonite.

(c) Study of the relationships between Georgian and Greek texts of the novel Barlaam and Ioasaph , and dating of the Greek text of the Barlaam and Ioasaph.

The works (articles and monographs) about these issues were published in Georgia as well as abroad and delivered at international Congresses of the Byzantine Studies.

On the topic of source studies it is noteworthy to single out the following innovations:

1. Discovery in the archives of Spain the letters of the Spanish monarchs Isabelle and Ferdinand written as a reply to the letter by the Georgian King Konstantine II dated to the end of the 15th century.

2. Discovery in the British Museum of two unknown fragments of an 11th-century Georgian manuscript one of which is the authograph of Giorgi the Athonite.

3. Discovery of unknown Georgian books and manuscripts in the library of Iviron (Mount Athos)

4. Discovery of Greek and Latin 13th century translations of a part of The Life of Giorgi Athonite

5. Discovery and re-publication of the speech delivered by Alaverdi Khan Undiladze at the court of Shah Abbas, at the end of the 16th century and published in England in the 17th century.

6. Translation and publication of the records about Georgia by a Spanish traveller of the beginning of the 15th century, Rui Gonsalez Klavikho.

Among the works of Prof. Khintibidze regarding the source studies ought to be singled out his theory about the etymology of the designations of Georgians. Khintibidze was awarded International Order of Merit, mention “International Order of Merit for Service to Kartvelian Studies” (Cambridge, 1994); Order of Merit of Georgia ( Tbilisi, 2003); Ivane Javakhishvili Scholarly Prize (1984)

== Issues regarding The Man in the Panther Skin ==
In the articles and monographs by E.Khintibidze on The Man in the Panther Skin (MPS) on the basis of an analysis of the key elements of the artistic structure, as well as key philosophical and theological terms of the Poem, an attempt is made to define the religious, philosophical and literary thought and the place of Rustaveli in Medieval thinking. Khintibidze's research on this field includes the following spheres: theological, philosophical, ethical and astrological. The scholastic terms in the MPS are studied also. The antique philosophical stream in The Man in the Panther Skin is discussed by Khintibidze. Namely, the Aristotelian definition of soul popular in the Medieval centuries; attitude of friendship in the MPS to the Aristotelian concept of friendship; the concept of the best middle; Rustvelian concept of vice in relation to Plato's ethical conception; It is found the trace of Plato's theory of perfection in the epic by Rustaveli; Significant part of the research to this field is assigned to a study of Rustaveli's ethical views, largely in the context of Christian and Classical (Plato and Aristotle) moral conceptions. The decision of murdering the groom; meeting at the castle of Kaj, categories of abundance and courage in The Man in the Panther Skin Special research is dedicated to the study of the concept of the human being in the MPS; For instance, regarding friendship as love. Prof. Khintibidze proposes a new interpretation of love in the epic of Rustaveli, according to which there is no sharp division between divine and human love: love is the one essence, one unity, a divine emotion, and only its manifestation between human beings can be depicted in literature. From this point of view, love also includes friendship. According to the theoretical discussion in the prologue of this poem, this concept takes rise from the interpretation of love mentioned in the New Testament and belongs to the type manifested later in European reality in Dante and Petrarca (but a different way) as a form of manifestation of the divine love in human love.

Prof. Khintibidze reveals the following cosmological model in The Man in the Panther Skin: God Heavenly forces Human world The scholar substantiates this model in specific studies. According to Khintibidze the world view of the MPS is introducing the ideas of Renaissance into the social attitudes of the late Middle Ages, the most significant of which is the emphasis on a human being, trust in his logical and analytical thinking. According to this theory, the Rustavelian world view is the harmonious synthesis of the Medieval and the Renaissance thought which does not imply the negation of the Medieval but complements it with the new philosophy – the Renaissance. According to the scholar, the belief in the values of this reality, perception of the beauty of the human world, belief in the human mind and intellect in Rustaveli's epic is directly connected to the traditional Christian ideals – beliefs in the immortality of the soul, eternity of the Good and Gracious Creator and the hope of union with the infinite God after death. This belief in the dual ideals – human and divine – had to be surrounded by a deep feeling of inner peacefulness and glory. This feature of the worldview must also condition those great poetic features which the poem still retains. The similar stage in the process of the Christian thought on the level of European literary and social thought is testified from the 13th-14th centuries. In the case of Rustaveli this starts with the Christian theology and is theoretically substantiated based on specific means and is weaving within the artistic system.

According to the final conclusion by Khintibidze, Of its contemporary and immediately following or proceeding great literary creations The Man in the Panther Skin is one of the first that expresses – with maximum conceptualization and consistency – the new world view, i.e. romantically coloured realistic outlook established in medieval transcendental Weltanschauung. Rustaveli is the youth of our contemporary thinking. Trusting in the beauty of life, power of reason and highest spiritual and emotional ideals, he dreams of man's happiness and sees this happiness – along with eternal life – in the triumph of good in earthly life and in man's love for human beings. Love and friendship are turned by Rustaveli into an ideal, which imparts divine elevation to man's earthly life. And the essence of human, man's cognitive life is seen precisely in this human relationship: friendship and love. The striving of the great intellectuals of the Late Middle Ages, including Rustaveli, towards establishing divine harmony in worldly reality, in later centuries developed under the primacy of search for material well-being in this world, gradually leading to a breakdown of medieval faith. The new period easily renounced the Renaissance ideals of search for man's moral and physical perfection and fame, setting up idols of money, accumulation of wealth and carnal pleasure. As though the moral foundation gained through the millennial history of mankind is being totally shaken: You shall not commit murder; you shall not commit adultery; you shall not give false evidence against your neighbor. The Biblical formula: “Where do you come from? Where are you going?” (Judg. 19.17) is acquiring a new shade and intonation. Considerable time will pass and a long process will set in of man's striving towards regaining the divine bearings of faith, hope and love, which will be followed from the start by a desire of gaining divine love in worldly relations. (gv. 790, msoflmxedvelobidan.) It is revealed by the scholar that Rustaveli's thinking not only finds parallels in the development of European literary thinking (Troubadours, Dante, Petrarcha), but the trace of the MPS is directly demonstrated in the European literary works. As revealed by Khintibidze, the plot of The Man in the Panther Skin is used by the English dramatists of the 17th century – William Shakespeare, Francis Beaumont and John Fletcher. The trace of the MPS's plot is evident in popular plays of the 17th century: Shakespeare's Cymbeline, Beaumonte and Fletcher's Philaster and King and No King. The author reveals an assumed way through which Rustaveli's epic must have reached the highest intellectual circles of Shakespearean England.

The monographs and papers by Prof. E. Khintibidze published in English on the topics of the MPS:

1. Rustaveli's The Man in the Panther Skin and European Literature, London, "Bennett and Bloom", 2011

2. Medieval and Renaissance Trends in Rustaveli's Vepkhistqaosani (The Man in the Panther's Skin), Tbilisi, 1993

3. Probleme der Weltanschauung im Epos Der Mann im Pantherfell von Schota Rustweli, Tbilisi, 1975.

4. The Man in Panther-skin in England in the Age of Shakespeare, Tbilisi, 2008

5. The World View of Rustaveli's Vepkhistqaosani (The Man in the Panther's Skin), Tbilisi, 2009

6. Aristotle and Rustaveli. – “Proceedings of the World Congress on Aristotle”, Athens, 1981, pp. 107–110

7. Elements of Medieval Sciences in Rustaveli's Poem (12th Century). – “Knowledge and Sciences in Medieval Philosophy” (Proceedings of the Eighth International Congress of Medieval Philosophy), Vol. III, Helsinki, 1990, pp. 440–445

8. The Outlook or Rustaveli and the Medieval Process of Religious, Philosophical and Literary Thought. – “An International Shota Rustaveli Symposium. History, Insight, Poetry” (Proceedings), Turku, 1991, pp. 18–26

9. Expanded Summary. – Medieval and Renaissance Trends in Rustaveli's Vepkhistqaosani (The Man in the Panther's Skin) by Elguja Khintibidze, Tbilisi, 1993, pp. 262–295

10. General Features of Georgian Literature in the Eyes of a Foreign Kartvelologist. – “The Kartvelologist”, #5, Tbilisi, 1999, pp. 6–12

11. An Example of Classical Greek Thought in Old Georgian Literature. – “Phasis”, Vol. 2-3, Tbilisi, 2000, pp. 194–197

12. Philosophy in Georgia in the Middle Ages. – “Studi dell’ Oriente Cristiano”, 5, Roma, 2001, pp. 153–163

13. Towards the Scholarly Value of the Study of Georgian Literature in Europe. – “Georgian Literature in European Scholarship”. Edited by Elguja Khintibidze, Amsterdam, 2001, pp. 171–779

14. Lancelot and Avtandil. – “The Kartvelologist”, #9, Tbilisi, 2002, pp. 30–46

15. The Rustavelian Interpretation of the Virtue of Fear of God and Medieval European Patristics. – “The Kartvelologist”, # 10, Tbilisi, 2003, pp. 89–95

16. Rustaveli, Dante, Petrarca. Reinterpretation of Love from the Middle Ages to the Renaissance. – “The Kartvelologist” #11, Tbilisi, 2004, pp. 78–125

17. Aristotelian Definition of Soul in Rustaveli's Poem (12th century). – “Intellect and Imagination in Medieval Philosophy”, Vol. IV, Porto, 2004, pp. 65–68

18. Reference to Plato in The Man in the Panther's Skin and its World View Purport. – “The Kartvelologist”, #12, 2005, pp. 66–82

19. A Free Interpretation of Plato's Viewpoint on Injustice in Rustaveli's Poem (12th century). – “XII International Congress of Medieval Philosophy (Abstracts),” Palermo, 2007, p. 71.

20. “Towards Rustaveli’s Place in Medieval European-Christian Thought”: Georgian Christian Thought and Its Cultural Context. Brill. Leiden, Boston, 2014, pp. 285–307

21. Love of The Man in the Panther Skin – a New Philosophical Concept, http://kartvelologi.tsu.ge/index.php/en/journal/inner/75

22. The Man in the Panther Skin – Shakespeare's Literary Source, "The Kartvelologist” #19, 2013, pp. 108–136

23. The Man in the Panther Skin and Cymbeline, "The Kartvelologist", #20, 2013, pp. 47–75 http://kartvelologi.tsu.ge/index.php/en/journal/inner/67

24. Rustaveli's The Man in the Panther Skin: Cultural Bridge from East to West and the Georgians of Safavid Iran. http://kartvelologi.tsu.ge/index.php/en/journal/inner/4

25. "Towards Rustaveli’s Place in Medieval European-Christian Thought”: Philalethes – Shalva Nutsubidze Memorial Volume, 2015 Brill publishing house, Leiden.

26. Reinterpretation and Renewal of the Concept of Love from the Middle Ages to the Renaissance International Medieval Congress 2015 – 6 – 9 July. “Reform and Renewal”:, Leeds, UK, 2015 - "Modification of the Byzantine Story Barlaam and Ioasaf; Changes in Its Scholarly Investigation and Further Perspective of the Study Problem“: 23rd International Congress of Byzantine Studies, Belgrade 2016. http://www.byzinst-sasa.rs/eng/uploaded/Plenary%20papers.pdf

27. "The Man in the Panther Skin: Cultural Bridge from East to West and from Middle Ages to the Renaissance": David Shemoqmedeli (ed.). The Knight in the Panther Skin – a Masterpiece in the World Literature, New York, 2016

Main monographs:

1. Georgian Versions of Basil the Great’s “Asceticon”. "Tbilisi University Press", Tbilisi, 1968, 215 p., (in Georgian).

2. Byzantine-Georgian Literary Contacts, "Tbilisi University Press", Tbilisi, 1969. 200p. (In Georgian)

3. Problems of Weltanschauung in The Man in the Panther Skin, "Tbilisi University Press", Tbilisi, 1975, 480 p. (in Georgian).

4. Concerning the Relationship of the Georgian and Greek Versions of Barlaam and Ioasaph. Paris, 1976. 36 p. (in English)

5. On the History of Georgian-Byzantine Literary Contacts. "Tbilisi University Press", Tbilisi, 1982. 450 p.

6. On Mt. Athos Georgian Literary School. "Ganatleba Publishers", Tbilisi, 1982. 145 p. (in Russian) Афонская грузинская литературная школа. «Издательство Ганатлеба», Тбилиси, 1982, 145 стр

7. Georgian-Byzantine Literary Contacts. "Tbilisi University Press", Tbilisi, 1989. 335 p (In Russian); Грузинско-Византийские литературные взаимоотношения, "Издательство Тбилиского университета", Тбилиси, 1989. 335 стр.

8. Medieval and Renaissance Trends in Rustaveli’s “Vepkhistkaosani” (The Man in the Panther Skin). "Tbilisi University Press", Tbilisi, 1993. 320 p. (In Georgian).

9. Georgian-Byzantine Literary Contacts. "Adolf M. Hakkert Publisher", Amsterdam 1996, 345 p. (In English)

10. The Designation of the Georgians and their Etymology. "Tbilisi University Press", Tbilisi, 1998. 160 p. (In Georgian and English).

11. Georgian Literature in European Scholarship (edited by E. Khintibidze). "Adolf M. Hakkert Publisher", Amsterdam, 2001. 390 p (in English).

12. Love in Vepkhistkaosani (The Man in the Panther Skin). “Kartvelologi”, Tbilisi, 2005. 140 p. (In Georgian)

13. "The Man in Panther-skin" in England in the Age of Shakespeare. "Kartvelologi", Tbilisi, 150 p. (in Georgian and in English).

14. The World View of Rustaveli's "Vepkhistqaosani" (The Man in the Panther Skin), "Kartvelologi", Tbilisi, 2009. 860 p. (In Georgian).

15. Rustaveli's ”The Man in the Panther Skin” and European Literature. "Bennett and Bloom", London, 2011 (205 p.) (in English).

16. "The Man in a Panther-skin" in the English Dramaturgy of Shakespeare and his Contemporaries, Tbilisi 2016, "Sachino", p. 308 (in Georgian).

17. Medieval Georgian Romance "The Man in a Panther-Skin" and Shakespeare's Late Plays. Adolf M. Hakkert-Publisher, Amsterdam, 2018 (in English).
