= Archil Tsagareli =

Georgian geologist (1913–1988)

- Born: 5 December 1913; Tbilisi, Georgia
- Died: 25 November 1988 (aged 74); Tbilisi, Georgia
- Education: Tbilisi State University
- Scientific career
- Fields: Geology

Archil Tsagareli (Georgian: არჩილ ცაგარელი; December 5, 1913 – November 25, 1988) was a prominent Georgian geologist. Member of the Georgian Academy of Sciences (1969). Honorary member of the Geological Society of London (1975). Doctor of Geological and Mineralogical Sciences (1951), professor (1954), Honored Scientist of the Georgian SSR (1966).

== Biography ==
Archil Tsagareli was born on 5 December 1913 in the Tbilisi. In 1936 he finished the Tbilisi State University. Since 1954 he worked as a pedagogue at Tbilisi State University. He had been working at Alexander Janelidze Institute of Geology from 1940 until his death, where he headed the department of regional geology. He was director of the Alexandre Janelidze Institute of Geology from 1979 to 1981. Since 1980 Tsagareli was academician-secretary Earth's sciences department of the Georgian Academy of Sciences. In 1951 defending his Doctor's degree.

Archil Tsagareli's scientific works concerned stratigraphy, paleontology, quaternary science and regional geology. He is the author of more than 100 scientific works, of which 7 is monograph. Most of his work contain important material of scientific significance and are being used to the present day. Tsagareli developed new scheme of the neotectonical stage Caucasus development. He also proposed chronology of the Caucasus alpine movement; set his age. In 1964 Geological Institute published on the collective, fundamental and generalizing work: "The Geology of Georgia", to be included in the All-Union series "The Geology of the USSR" as its 10-th volume. Tsagareli undertook to write the "physiographic description", "late cretaceous", "quaternary system", "history of geological development", "geomorphology" and "some issues of economic geology" chapter. Archil Tsagareli was also co-author and co-editor this work.

He perfectly spoke Russian, English and French languages. He was awarded a State Prize of the Georgia in 1973. He was also laureate of Alexander Janelidze Prize of the Georgian National Academy of Sciences.
