= Tinatin Sadunishvili =

Georgian biologist and academic (born 1952)

Tinatin Sadunishvili (Georgian: თინათინ სადუნიშვილი; born 22 December 1952) is a Georgian biologist and academic. A member of the Georgian National Academy of Sciences since 2015, her research focuses on plant biochemistry.

== Career ==
Sadunishvili was born on 22 December 1952 in Tbilisi, Georgian Soviet Socialist Republic. She got a degree in biology in 1975 from the Tbilisi State University and got a doctor of science in biology from the Institute of Plant Biochemistry of the National Academy of Sciences of Georgia in 1995 with a thesis on studies on structure, kinetics and regulation of nitrogen metabolism enzyme and ammonia assmimilation pathways in plants.

Between 1994 and 2004, Sadunishvili worked as professor of the Georgian Technical University. She has worked as head of Laboratory at Durmishidze Institute of Biochemistry and Biotechnology of the Sergi Durmishidze Institute of Biochemistry and Biotechnology of the Agricultural University of Georgia since 2005 and since 2013 she is full professor and head of department of plant biochemistry and biotechnolgy.

In 2009 Sadunishvili was appointed corresponding member of the Georgian National Academy of Sciences and in 2015 full member. In 2022 she was elected member of the The World Academy of Sciences directory.

She has been invited professor and researcher at foreign universities such as Eötvös Loránd University (Hungary), University of Murcia, (Spain), Lawrence Berkeley National Laboratory, (USA) and Meisei University (Japan).

Sadunishvili is also member of the European Plant Science Organization and has worked on mentoring young scientists, especially women. She is also member of the editorial boards of scientifics journals such as Agrarian Science, Microbiology and Biotechnology and the Bulletin of the Georgian National Academy of Sciences.

== Books ==
- Plants for a Healthy Environment (co-author), Batumi, Sak. Sci. Acad. Biochem. and Biotech. In-T, 2005, p. 232
