= Nikolai Vvedensky =

Russian physiologist

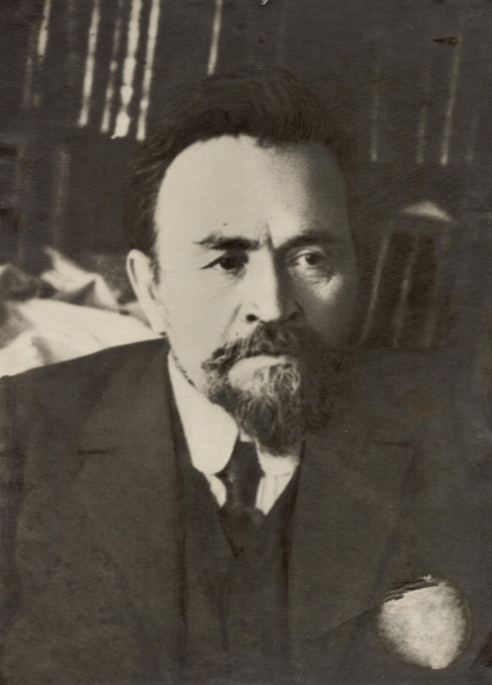

Nikolai Evgenievich Vvedensky (Russian: Николай Евгеньевич Введенский; 28 April 1852 - 16 September 1922) was a physiologist who came up with a theory of parabiosis which examined the phenomenon of anaesthesia and was among the first to use electrical sensors to study nerve activity and physiology. He was from the Russian Empire.

Vvedensky was born in Kochkovo, Vologda where his father was a village priest. After a basic education at home, he joined the Vologda Theological School in 1862. He joined St Petersburg University to study law in 1872 but quickly transferred to the natural sciences. In 1874 he was arrested for revolutionary activities and after three years in prison he graduated in 1879 and studied physiology with I. M. Sechenow, receiving a master's degree in 1884 after which he spent time in Germany, Austria and Switzerland. He became a professor at Moscow in 1889 and moved to St. Petersburg University in 1895. He began to examine nerve excitation in frogs and he chose to use a telephone device to capture nerve activity. He examined how nerve impulses caused a prolonged contraction of attached muscles. He introduced the idea of parabiosis or the reduction of normal excitation by the application of repeated stimuli. He identified narcosis as a form of inhibition produced by stimulation. Vvedensky parabiosis is now explained in terms of cell membrane depolarization. In 1908 he became the a professor at the Psychoneurological Institute founded by V.M. Bekhterev. He organized the first congress of Russian physiologists in 1917 and influenced psychophysiology research.
