= Jaba Samushia =

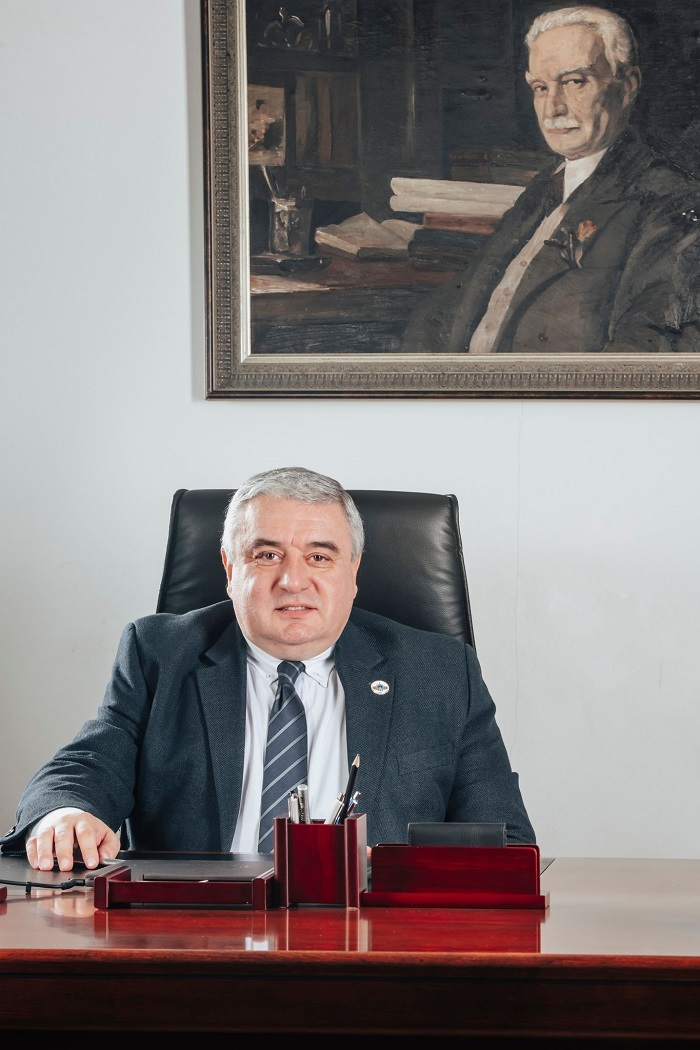

Rector of Tbilisi State University
- Incumbent
- Assumed office 20 October 2022
- Preceded by: George Sharvashidze

Director General of Shota Rustaveli National Science Foundation
- In office 2020–2022
- Preceded by: Zviad Gabisonia
- Succeeded by: Erekle Astakhishvili

Personal details
- Born: ჯაბა სამუშია 15 August 1971 (age 54)
- Children: 3

Jaba Samushia (born 15 August 1971) is a Georgian political and public figure, historian, Doctor of Historical Sciences (2002), Professor, Academician of the Georgian National Academy of Sciences (2022), Full Professor of Ivane Javakhishvili Tbilisi State University (2012), Acting Rector of Tbilisi State University since October 20, 2022 and elected Rector since December 27, 2022; Editor-in-Chief of "Istoriani" magazine; Director General of Rustaveli National Science Foundation since 2020.

In 2002–2010, he was the chronicler of the Holy Trinity Cathedral; in 2010–2014, he served as the deputy chairman of the Tbilisi City Assembly; a member of the scientific council of the Studia Orientalne Magazine; the laureate of the highest award of the University of Warsaw – the University Award; a member of the National Committee of Historians of Georgia; the President's Scholar in 2003; the laureate of the highest award of the University of Warsaw - the University Award for his contribution to the deepening of Georgian-Polish relations.

== Career ==
He participated in the preparation of a number of publications, such as the Dictionary of Georgian Diplomacy, Ivane Javakhishvili Encyclopedic Dictionary, the Democratic Republic of Georgia (1918-1921), Encyclopedic Dictionary, etc. Under his leadership several large-scale projects were implemented: five volumes of the works of Ivane Javakhishvili Tbilisi State University and 30 volumes of the Illustrated History of Georgia. From 2014 to 2017, he was the head of the project Georgian Fortresses of Tao-Klarjeti” funded by Shota Rustaveli National Science Foundation.

Since 2010, Samushia has been the author and host of the radio program „Istoriani with Jaba Samushia. In 2008-2009, he participated in the Channel One media project "Great Ten" as a chief expert; in 2007, he was a co-author and expert of the script of the television series "History of Georgia" (TV company "Mze"); in 2006-2008 - an expert of the TV series "Mkhedartmtavari" (Commander-in-Chief; TV company "Georgia").

In 2018, Samushia was appointed deputy director of Rustaveli National Science Foundation and on August 11, 2020, he became the director of the same foundation.

On October 20, 2022, Samushia was elected acting rector of Tbilisi State University and later on December 27, he became the 30th rector of TSU.

== Personal life ==
Jaba Samushia is married. He has a wife, Nino Grdzelidze (born August 13, 1982) and three children: Tsotne Samushia (born June 11, 2007); Tornike Samushia (born December 7, 2009) and Davit (Data) Samushia (born September 18, 2013).

== Works ==
- Essays from the history of medieval Georgia, Book 1, Tbilisi, 1999.
- From the history of one ideological campaign (USSR territorial pretensions towards Turkey in 1945–1953), Tbilisi, 2003.
- The Bagrationi Royal Family (XI-XII centuries), genealogical essay, Tbilisi, 2003.
- King Giorgi II (co-author R. Metreveli), Tbilisi 2003 (2nd updated edition, Tbilisi 2018).
- Artanuji Fortress, Tbilisi 2008.
- The Great Struggles of Georgia, Tbilisi, 2009.
- This is how the Holy Trinity Cathedral was built, Tbilisi, 201000 p.
- Mystery of King Tamar's Grave, Tbilisi 2010.
- Bagrat III, Tbilisi, 2012 (2 nd updated edition, Tbilisi 2018).
- Military History of Georgia (essays), Tbilisi, 2015.
- Genghis Khan, Tbilisi, 2018
- King Giorgi II, Tbilisi, 2018
- King Bagrat IV, Tbilisi, 2018
- King Giorgi I, Tbilisi, 2019
- Old Tbilisi, historical essay, a series of popular scientific books, volume 10, Tbilisi, 2019
- David Ulu, Tbilisi, 2019
- David Narini, Tbilisi, 2019
- David III Kouropalates, Tbilisi 2020
- Ashot Kouropalates, Tbilisi, 2020
- Georgian Fortresses of Tao-Klarjeti, volume 1, under the editorship of G. Bagrationbi, B. Kupatadze and J. Samushia, Tbilisi, 2020.
- Georgian Fortresses of Tao-Klarjeti, volume 2, under the editorship of G. Bagrationbi, B. Kupatadze and J. Samushia, Tbilisi, 2020.
- Georgian Fortresses of Tao-Klarjeti, volume 3, under the editorship of G. Bagrationbi, B. Kupatadze and J. Samushia, Tbilisi, 2020.
- Battle of Didgori, "Dzlevai Sakvirveli", Tbilisi, 2021
- Essays from the History of Georgia, Tbilisi, 2022
- Historical Research, Tbilisi, 2022
