= Alexander Tvalchrelidze =

Georgian geologist (1881–1957)

- Born: 1 December 1881; Stanitsa Batalpashinskaya, Russian Empire
- Died: 29 July 1957 (aged 75); Tbilisi, Soviet Union
- Education: Moscow University
- Scientific career
- Fields: Geology

Alexander Tvalchrelidze (Georgian: ალექსანდრე თვალჭრელიძე; December 1, 1881 – July 29, 1957) was a Georgian geologist. Member of the Georgian Academy of Sciences (1941). Doctor of Geological and Mineralogical Sciences (1947), professor (1919), Honored Scientist of the Georgian SSR (1946). He led numerous expeditions that discovered useful deposits of metals, marble, and in particular, clay deposits. The mineral of Tvalchrelidzeite is named after Alexander Tvalchrelidze.

== Biography ==
Alexander Tvalchrelidze was born on 1 December 1881 in the Stanitsa Batalpashinskaya in the family of the distinguished teacher and public figure Anton Tvalchrelidze. In 1900 Alexander Tvalchrelidze finished the stavropol gymnasium and in the same year entered the Moscow University.

On the 29th of May 1912 he graduated from the Moscow University with the first-class diploma. In his student years Alexander Tvalchrelidze established close relations with his teacher Academician Vladimir Vernadsky and with Alexander Fersman, who at the time was a young scientist and subsequently became and academician. In 1918 Alexander Tvalchrelidze received an invitation from the adminisitration of the newly opened University of Tbilisi, but on account of the Civil War he succeeded in coming to Tbilisi only in 1919.

In October 1919 he was elected a professor and holder of the mineralogy and petrography chair. In March 1920 he published in the Georgian language the first textbook on geometrical crystallography. In the autumn of 1924 he starts to explore the Dzirula massif. Later on, his first attempts developed in the systematic exploration of the ancient massifs of Georgia. In the 20s he began his investigations — which one might regard as classical — of the Georgian bentonites.

In the spring 1928, to study the properties of the clay from Cumbri he ran a series of tests first in the Central Laboratory of the "Azneft" and next in the laboratory of the oil syndicate in Batumi and in the laboratory of the Tbilisi University. He was awarded two Order of Lenin and three Order of the Red Banner of Labor.
