= Kochukovo =

Kochukovo Кочуково
- Village
- Location within Vladimir Oblast Location within Russia
- Coordinates: 56°04′N 39°57′E
- Country: Russia
- Region: Vladimir Oblast
- District: Sobinsky District
- Time zone: UTC+3:00

Kochukovo (Russian: Кочуково) is a rural locality (a village) in Kurilovskoye Rural Settlement, Sobinsky District, Vladimir Oblast, Russia. The population was 1 as of 2010.

== Geography ==
Kochukovo is located on the Vorsha River, 13 km north of Sobinka (the district's administrative centre) by road. Rybkhoz Vorsha is the nearest rural locality.
