= Alexander Janelidze =

Georgian geologist and statesman

- Born: 5 November 1888; Nikortsminda, Ambrolauri district, Georgia
- Died: 16 January 1975 (aged 86); Tbilisi, Georgia
- Education: University of Paris; Kazan University
- Scientific career
- Fields: Geology; Paleontology

Alexander Janelidze (Georgian: ალექსანდრე ჯანელიძე; November 5, 1888 – January 16, 1975) was a Georgian geologist and statesman. Member of the Georgian Academy of Sciences (1941). Doctor of Geological and Mineralogical Sciences (1923), professor (1925), Honored Scientist of the Georgian SSR (1946). A member of the Communist Party of the Soviet Union from 1942.

Alexander Janelidze was born on 5 November 1888 in the village of Nikortsminda, Ambrolauri district, Georgia. In 1910 he finished the University of Paris, and in 1916 Kazan University. He served Rector of the Tbilisi State University (1942–1945).

Alexander Janelidze founded the faculty of Geology and Paleontology at the Georgian Technical University and acted as the head of the faculty for many years. For 30 years, Alexander Janelidze ran the Institute of Geology which was founded by him in 1925 at Tbilisi State University. He also established Georgian Geological Society, which he devotedly chaired until his death. Museum of Paleontology was established under the Alexander Janelidze in 1924.

His scientific works concerned Paleontology, Stratigraphy, Tectonics, Engineering geology, Hydrogeology, Geomorphology, Theoretical geology et al. Alexander Janelidze is the author of more than 150 essays, among them monographs and textbooks. Alexander Janelidze died in Tbilisi in 1975 and was buried there, at the Didube Pantheon.
