= Ivane Beritashvili =

Georgian physiologist

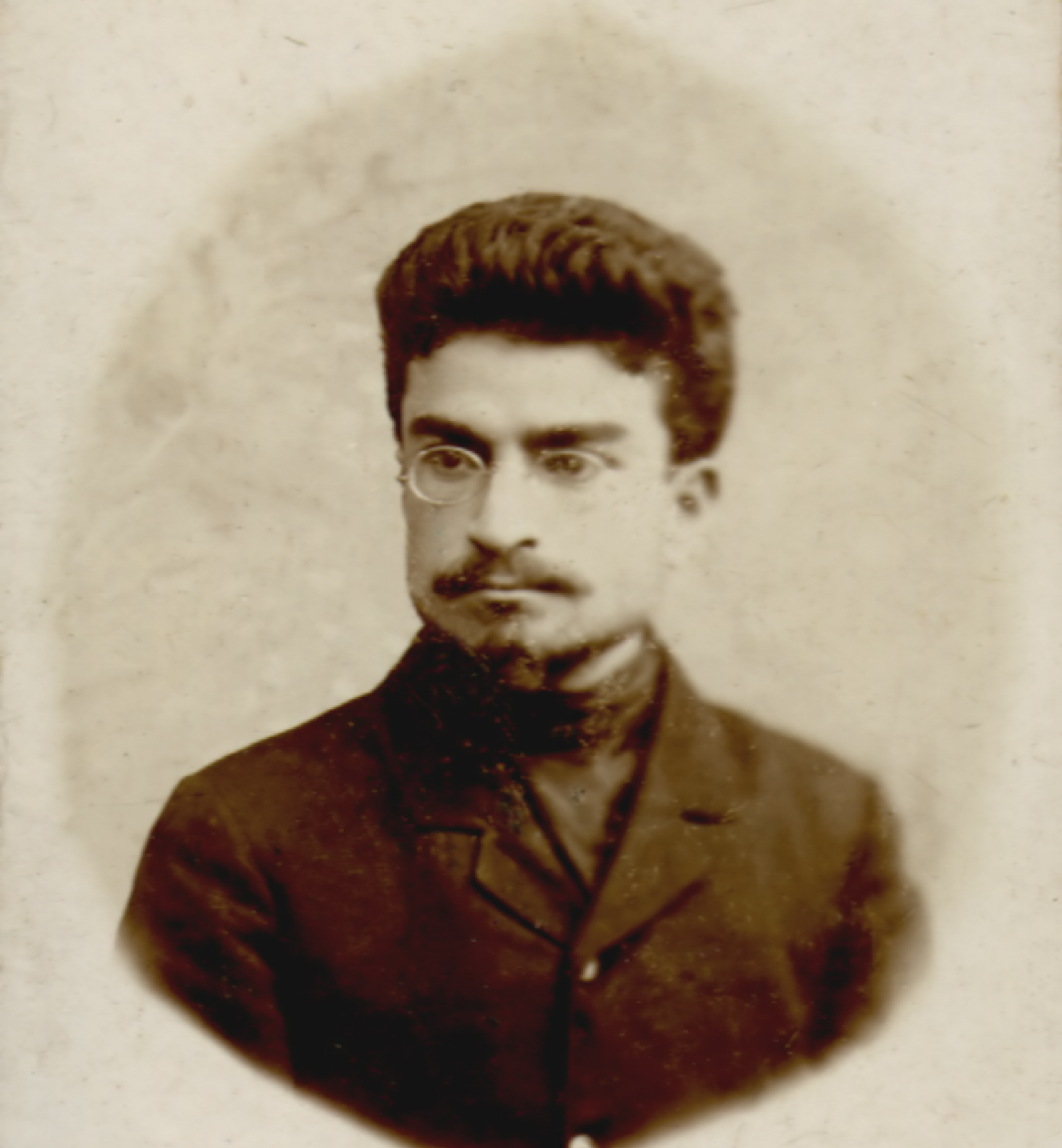
- Ivane Beritashvili as a student of St. Petersburg University (1910)
- Born: 10 January 1885; Vejini, Gurjaani Municipality, Russian Empire
- Died: 29 December 1974 (aged 89); Tbilisi, Georgian SSR, Soviet Union
- Education: Saint Petersburg State University
- Awards: Hero of Socialist Labour (1964)
- Scientific career
- Fields: physiology

Ivane Beritashvili (Georgian: ივანე ბერიტაშვილი; 10 January 1885 – 29 December 1974), was one of the great Georgian physiologists, one of the founders of the modern biobehavioral science. He was a founder and director of a school of physiology in Georgia; academician of the Academy of Sciences of the USSR (1939), founding member of the Academy of Medical Sciences of the USSR (1944) and of the Academy of Sciences of the Georgian SSR (1941). In 1964 Beritashvili received Hero of Socialist Labor award. For more than a half-century of his activity, Beritashvili was considered a leader among neurophysiologists of Central and Eastern European countries and the former Soviet Union. In the study of higher brain functions he tried to bridge the gap between physiology and psychology and did much to bring them closer together. In 1958–1960 together with Herbert Jasper and Henri Gastaut, he was one of the founders of the International Brain Research Organization (IBRO).

== Life ==
Britashvili was born in Tiflis Governorate on 19 December 1884 into the family of a Georgian Orthodox priest in the small village of Vejini in Kakheti, in the Eastern region of Georgia (at that time part of the Russian Empire). Following in his fathers footsteps he studied for the priesthood at the theological seminary in Tiflis (Tbilisi). Because he came to dislike the prospect of becoming a priest, the young Ivane took examinations for the school-leaving certificate at the 2nd Tiflis gymnasium in 1906. In the same year he enrolled in the Natural Division of the Department of Physical and Mathematical Sciences of St. Petersburg University and soon attracted the attention of the professors of their abilities and hard work. Beritashvili began his experimental research early, as a third year student under the supervision of the eminent Russian physiologist Prof. Nikolay E. Wedensky (1852–1922). Beritashvili studied the problem of reciprocal innervation of skeletal musculature in frogs showing that local strychninization of the dorsal horn did not disrupt the coordination of the “wiping” reflex. The results of his first work were published in 1911. In the preceding year he graduated from the university and was invited by Wedensky for the first 2.5 years and then for a further 2 years to work in the University Physiological Laboratory.

At the recommendation of Wedensky, Beritashvili left for Kazan in autumn 1911 to work with Prof. A. P. Samoilov (1867–1930) to master the method of registering electric currents in nerves and muscles by the string galvanometer that, in turn, Samoilov had learned from Willem Einthoven (1860–1927) in Leiden in 1904. Later, in the spring of 1914, again with Wedensky's support, Beritashvili joined Rudolf Magnus (1873–1927) in Utrecht to study the techniques of mammalian neurosurgery (decebreration, sectioning the dorsal roots, etc.), the principles of body posture and tonic neck and labyrinthine reflexes in mammals (later the Magnus–de Kleijn reflexes). At the start of the World War I Beritashvili had to cease his research and return to St. Petersburg.

In 1915 Beritashvili had to leave St. Petersburg and move to Odessa as a Senior Assistant to Prof. V. V. Zavyalov at the Chair of Physiology in the Physical and Mathematical Department of Novorossyisk University. This Chair was established by Ivan Sechenov (1829–1905) who had held the Chair for six years, from 1870 to 1876. One year later, after Beritashvili had been appointed a private docent, he began giving lectures in the course on the physiology of the nerve-muscle system. During that period he studied defensive reflexes in dogs by the method of Vladimir Bekhterev (1857–1927).

After the Russian Revolution in 1917, Georgia attained freedom and independence for the short period between 1918 and 1921. During it, in 1918, Ivane Javakhishvili established the first University of Tiflis and Beritashvili received an invitation to organize its physiological department and the course instruction in physiology. In 1919 he set up this Department and from that time onward Beritashvili succeeded in progressively developing intensive physiological teaching and research in Georgia. By 1920–1921 he had published in Tiflis the first Georgian-language textbook on physiology, in two volumes and with a practical guide, and in 1922 in the Russian language. At the same time, he founded a physiological research laboratory and started intensive work. Beritashvili thus realized what for Ivane R. Tarkhnishvili (Ivan Tarkhanov, Tarchanoff) (1846–1908), the Georgian-Russian physiologist discoverer of the psychogalvanic reflex, had been only a dream—to establish a laboratory in his native land.

Later, in 1937, Beritashvili published a comprehensive handbook in Moscow in Russian entitled General Physiology of Nerve and Muscle Systems. For this book he was awarded the Stalin Prize in 1941. Later revised and enlarged—in 1947 and 1959—this book guided many generations of “Soviet” physiologists. A number of other fundamental handbooks, General Physiology of the Central Nervous System (1948), the third revised and enlarged edition of 1966, and Structure and Function of the Cerebral Cortex of 1969, were also published in Moscow in Russian.

During this period Beritashvili was one of the organizers and founders of the Georgian Academy of Sciences. He was initially Head of the Biological Division of the Caucasian Branch of Academy of Sciences of the USSR (1933–1941), and after the foundation of the Georgian Academy of Sciences he was Head of its Department of Biomedical Sciences (1941–1974).

In 1938 Beritashvili was awarded the Pavlov Prize for important contributions to the study of the peripheral and central nervous systems, and higher brain functions. In 1962 he was also awarded the Sechenov Prize for his book Neural Mechanisms of Higher Vertebrate Behavior, which, with the support of H. Jasper, was translated from Russian into English and published in Boston (1965).

In 1939 Beritashvili established the Georgian Society for Physiology, Biochemistry and Pharmacology (since 1957 the Georgian Physiological Society). In the same year he was elected an Academician of the Academy of Sciences of the USSR and in 1944 became a founding member and an Academician of the Academy of Medical Sciences of the USSR.

During his long life Beritashvili was the author of almost 400 research and review papers, many chapters in books, a dozen monographs, and the comprehensive three volume handbook and the two-volume textbook that were republished many times. He wrote his first book in 1916, at the age of 32, and his last, revised and expanded, was published in 1974, the year of his death when he was almost 90 years old. Ivane Beritashvili died of acute pneumonia on 29 December 1974 in Tbilisi, two weeks before his 90-year jubilee. He was buried in the square of Tbilisi State University, alongside the founder of the university, Ivane Javakhishvili.

== Research ==
=== Neurophysiology ===
On the basis of experiments with local strychninization of the spinal cord in frogs, Beritashvili determined in 1910 that the coordinating apparatus for flexure reflexes is located in the dorsal horn of the segment where the sensory fibers of the corresponding receptive field entered. It was his first work, 40 years later, with the same experimental design but using the oscilloscope and registration of electrical potentials of the sensory and motor roots, he confirmed the correctness of the principles he had formulated earlier. In particular, he showed in 1950 that even when poisoned with strychnine, intercalary or internuncial neurons (“interneurones”) of one segment excited through the appropriate dorsal root fibers activated motor neurons in the given segment but without involving the existing interneurons.

In Wedensky's laboratory, and at the same time as Charles S. Sherrington (1857–1952), Beritashvili used the string galvanometer to study the central coordination of spinal reflexes in the registration of action currents of antagonist muscles. In 1913–1914 he discovered the rhythmic nature of reciprocal inhibition. Ten years later, in 1924, E. D. Adrian, J. F. Fulton, and E. T. Liddell (1924) confirmed these findings.

As early as 1912 his supervisor Alexei Ukhtomsky (1875–1942) proposed that Beritashvili should study reciprocal excitation and inhibition in cats and two years later they resumed work on tonic reflexes and electric potentials of muscle in decerebrated cats. After returning from working with Magnus, Beritashvili renewed his experiments on cervical and labyrinthine tonic reflexes with even more success. He showed that during the rotation of the neck around the body in which the receptors of the neck muscles were stimulated, and during changes of head position, in which labyrinthine receptors were stimulated, the only effect was an increase of excitability of certain tonic centers. By 1915 he concluded that the tonic reflex appeared to be due to excitation of these tonic centers in response to additional peripheral stimulation. R. Magnus included these data in his famous book Körperstellung of 1924.

Beritashvili was greatly interested in the problems of general inhibition. Together with collaborators he showed that this phenomenon, first discovered by Ivan Sechenov in 1863, could be induced by the stimulation of the skin, the sensory and autonomic nerves, the visceral organs, and the surface of the brain. Beritashvili concluded that general inhibition was an indispensable component of the central nervous system (CNS) response to any stimulation, even subthreshold stimulation that evoked an outward reaction. The biological significance of general inhibition consists in the fact that: (1) in response to stimuli important for life, excitation is restricted to the nerve centers responsible for the appropriate outward reaction; (2) under weak stimulation, general inhibition protects the organism from the wasteful expenditure of energy. In 1936–1937 Beritashvili arrived at the very interesting conclusion that general inhibition was a function of what he called the “neuropil” of the brainstem that not only exerted general inhibition but also general excitation on the CNS. What Beritashvili called the neuropil is the structure, which is now well known as the reticular formation. Sadly, his four papers on this problem were published only in Soviet journals and the world physiological community did not pay them proper attention. In 1949 Horace Winchell Magoun and Giuseppe Moruzzi rediscovered and described this phenomenon precisely.

While studying single reflex contractions of muscles in cats in 1941, Beritashvili demonstrated, independently of B. Renshow, the antidromic inhibitory effect. Moreover, he showed that antidromic inhibition extends through several segments and even both sides of the spinal cord. Beritashvili was one of the first physiologists to appreciate fully the role of dendrites and in 1941 formulated the notion that dendrites generate local, non-conductive currents in response to impulses. Now this principle is well proven for apical dendrites of pyramidal neurons.

Before World War II, Beritashvili began an extraordinary line of experimentation that, figuratively, ultimately provided the giant's shoulders on which Roger Wolcott Sperry (1913–1994) stood to receive his 1981 Nobel award. From 1936 to 1940, interrupted by the war and never resumed, Beritashvili with his assistant Nina Chichinadze (1896–1972) performed a series of ingenious experiments, testing the ability of one cerebral hemisphere to search out memories initially laid down in the other. Although the puzzle posed by the “two brains” and the huge band of fibers connecting them, had been recognized for centuries, and desultorily explored, almost nothing was known concerning hemispheric interchange, if any. They showed that training the pigeon via one eye, to distinguish different colored patterns, conveyed no advantage to learning with the other, untrained eye. In other words, for these complex visual stimuli what had been learned with one hemisphere was inaccessible to the other. Then they showed that, with the same stimuli and procedure, switching eyes with cats or puppies did not disturb the memory for the discrimination; either the bilaterality of the optical input had allowed each hemisphere to learn simultaneously, or one hemisphere had behaviorally effective access to memories held in the other. Possibly consequent to the ensuing war, this paper seems often to have escaped attention, despite its being the foundation for the extensive investigation of interhemispheric mnemonic processes in the last half of the 20th century.

=== Behavior ===
Beritashvili began to investigate animal behavior while studying conditioned reflexes in Tbilisi in the 1920s. He introduced a new experimental approach allowing the free movement of animals. In contrast to Pavlov, he declined to use a stand for dogs and observed the behavior of animals (rabbits, cats, dogs, monkeys) during unrestricted locomotion within the experimental space. It was a good and bold decision, which provided more natural conditions for the study of acquired reflexes and behavior. Through this peculiar method, Beritashvili made an important contribution to the science of animal behavior.

==== "Free Behavior" ====
Early on in the Tbilisi period (1919–1941), Beritashvili grew dissatisfied with the unnatural restraints that the conditioning procedure imposes on the animal, and went on to develop a paradigm of “free behavior” in most of his subsequent work on goal-directed behavior. Among his most important decisions, he abandoned the Pavlov/Bekhterev paradigm for the study of conditional reflexes. He was highly critical of this approach, as well as of the behaviorism, prevalent in North America at that time. Instead, he was attracted by the common knowledge of the ability of dogs to find their way to food, and the brief experiments of Wolfgang Köhler (1887–1967) testing this ability in dogs as well as in chimpanzees. However, unsatisfied with Köhler's few observations, as well as with Pavlov's explanation of them as examples of conditional reflexes, Beritashvili committed himself to testing behavior in freely moving animals—a method that was inherently natural and versatile. The prototypical example of such learning is that of a hungry dog, brought for the first time into a particular room and fed there at a specific place. Following such a single exposure, the animal would run directly to that place of food immediately upon entering that same room, even if this occurred several months later.

==== Image-driven behavior ====
In the study of conditioned reflexes by the method of free movements, Beritashvili was confronted with actions that could not be explained by or described as conditioned reflexes. For instance, if the animal only once found food at a given place, on that and following days it ran to the same place. Beritashvili concluded that in higher vertebrates an image of the food and its location arose during the animal's perception of the food. This image was reproduced when the animal was in the same situation; moreover the animal later behaved in the same manner by sniffing, etc., if it returned to the place where it had first found the food. This orientating, or investigatory image-guided behavior, supposed the projection of the image of the object the animal recognized onto the outer environment where it had first perceived the food. Such image-regulated behavior was termed by Beritashvili psychoneural, or later image-driven behavior. He assumed this behavior to be a complex of voluntary movements peculiar to higher vertebrates and mammals as well as to little children. He supposed that whenever a feeding behavior is learned that is directed towards a particular food box, it originally conforms to the reproduced food image. The image of the food box's location is also reproduced and can play an accessory role. Thus, Beritashvili straightforwardly called the total feeding behavior of an animal “image-driven”, in case its movements during the task were unrestrained. While such descriptive terminology carries some prejudice from the days of behaviorism as being hopelessly anthropomorphic, denying the validity of the term is equally suspect. Given the manifold similarities not only in the anatomy, but also in the psychophysics of many lower primates and man, it is strange to deny that equivalent anatomy and physiology generate similar percepts. Human “image-driven” behavior is itself a sufficiently general experience so that a diminished form thereof seems defensibly lucid in describing the equivalent phenomenon among mammals.

==== Beritashvili – "Anti-Pavlovian" ====
In 1947, Beritashvili first summarized his theory in the book Basic Forms of Neural and Psychoneural Activity, and then extended it in his next monograph Neural Mechanisms of Higher Vertebrate Behavior (1961, translated into English in 1965). Meanwhile, he had studied problems of spatial orientation in mammals in a special book published in 1959. On the background of the country's difficult political situation, however, the new lines of research opened up in these works received negative reactions from the Pavlovian school—particularly after the publication of his 1947 book. Beritashvili's conclusion that psychoneural activity differed in principle from conditioned reflexes led to a dispute among Russian physiologists, and provided the basis for classifying Beritashvili among the “anti-Pavlovians.” Before the death of Stalin and the ensuing abatement of terror, Beritashvili and many of his leading fellow physiologists — Leon Orbeli, Pyotr Anokhin, A.D. Speransky, Lina Stern, N.A. Rozhansky, and others—were called before the 1950 joint scientific sessions (of the USSR Academy of Sciences and the USSR Academy of Medical Sciences) to confess to being “enemies of the doctrine of Pavlov”.This atmosphere of terror and repression kept Beritashvili and most Soviet scientists crucially isolated and, in great many instances (e.g., Lysenkoism, Pavlov “worship”), hobbled by political restraint. Bravely, Beritashvili followed his own path, and held to a course of highly original experimentation after the period of seclusion from 1950–1955. However, he had to remain sensibly cautious in his Western contacts, being especially vulnerable due to his previous “foreign” publications.

==== Spatial Orientation ====
Between 1955 and 1959, after his rehabilitation, Beritashvili focused his research on problems of spatial orientation in higher vertebrates, infants, and man. Spatial orientation in the environment manifests in the ability to project or localize the position of a perceived object in the outer environment in relation to oneself and other external objects. Beritashvili established that various sensory receptors are involved in producing the image of spatial orientation, but that only the stimulation of visual, auditory and labyrinthine receptors can induce images of the spatial arrangement of external objects in the environment and their spatial relations to the animal's location. With subtle experiments he demonstrated that the stimulation of labyrinthine receptors during animal locomotion is highly important for spatial orientation in the environment, and that proprioceptive excitation is not involved in producing the image of the route the animal has traveled. However, upon repeated traversal of the route, the stimulation of proprioceptors turns into conditional signals for movements that then proceed automatically like chain-conditioned reflexes. Experiments extirpating various cortical regions in dogs and cats demonstrated that the front half of the suprasylvian fissure is responsible for spatial orientation under labyrinthine and auditory stimulation.

Beritashvili concluded that spatial orientation in higher vertebrates is reflected in their ability to project an object into space and localize its position in relation to itself or to other objects, and this after a single perception of the respective object by the animal. Also, spatial orientation is required to approach the object or to move from one object to another when the animal neither sees them nor perceives the objects through any other senses. Moreover, all sensory information from receptors may play an important role in spatial orientation. However, the optic receptors and vestibular semicircular canals, utricle, and saccule play a most significant part, since their exclusion renders normal orientation in space impossible.

In infant ontogenesis spatial images arise first via visual perception, then through vestibular, and finally through auditory perception. Special spatial orientation studies in the blind showed that the latter judged obstacles in the distance by sensations in the face area, based on cutaneous receptor stimulation resulting from conditional reflex constriction of facial muscles. All these investigations were included in Beritashvili's book Nervous Mechanisms of Spatial Orientation in Mammals, published in Russian (1959).

In our view, Beritashvili, as the first to study spatial navigation in higher vertebrates, in parallel with Edward C. Tolman (1886–1959), deserve a mention in the Nobel background document for 2014 Nobel Prize in Physiology or Medicine to John O'Keefe, and Edvard I. Moser and May-Britt Moser. His contribution warrant reappraisal, as do these of many other scientist who worked in the former Soviet Union and Central and Eastern European countries, and who were often vilified and isolated from the international scientific community.

==== Vestibular System ====
Beritashvili was acutely aware that image-driven behavior referred not only to an object or event, but also a location. Thus, returning to his early experiments with Rudolf Magnus on the eve of World War I in Utrecht, he performed an extensive analysis of the role of the vestibular system, as opposed to muscular proprioception, in guiding orientation in space. The results were clear, both in cats and dogs, and in children. In the absence of vision, the labyrinthine system, and not muscular proprioception, provides the information necessary for orientation and path registration. Labyrinthectomized animals, even after several months of recovery and specific training, were unable to follow a newly given path when vision was absent (due to blindfolds). With sufficient repetition, they could be trained to pursue a particular path in an unchanging sequence. In other words, they could learn a sequence of turns, but lacking vision as well as the vestibular system, they were wholly disoriented. This has now been fully confirmed with rats. Recent work with human subjects passively translocated through space has suggested that cues other than those provided by the otoliths are important for perceiving features of lateral movement. However, Beritashvili's observations on deaf-mute children definitively demonstrate that in the absence of vision, the labyrinths are essential for orientation and for subsequent following of a path along which these children have been led, or even passively transported. The deaf-mutes lacking labyrinthine function were totally disoriented in this situation, whereas blind children performed significantly better than normal, blindfolded children.

==== Image-driven Memory ====
Beritashvili's work in the last decade of his life was devoted to memory research. Using multiple variations of this investigation, Beritashvili studied the mnemonic capabilities of various vertebrates from fish to microcephalic and normal children, the effect of restricted sensory input, and the removal of various portions of the CNS in animals. He distinguished three types of vertebrate memory: image-driven memory, emotional memory, and conditioned-reflex memory. In his experiments, image-driven memory was investigated by the method of delayed responses during free movement. Together with his collaborators, Beritashvili carried out fundamental research on the phylogeny of the image-driven memory and found that particularly in fish, amphibians and reptiles, only short-term memory images are formed, but in birds (hens, pigeons) long-term memory images also exist. In the phylogenetic development from fish to monkey, short-term memory extends from several seconds in fish to some dozens of minutes in higher vertebrates. Long-term memory extends from several minutes in birds to several months in dogs and monkeys. According to Beritashvili, image-driven memory in all vertebrates is a result of forebrain activity; with the development of the cortex, image-driven memory becomes its most important function. For instance, the associative areas of the proreal fissure and temporal lobe play a key role in the retention of the images of recognized objects. Beritashvili considered the substrate of image-driven memory to be located in the neural circuits between the proreal fissure, the visual cortex, the inferior temporal cortex, and the hippocampus.

Beritashvili's book on memory, Vertebrate Memory, its Characteristic and Origin, was first published in Russian in Tbilisi (1968) and soon translated into English (1971). The second, revised and enlarged edition was published in Moscow (1974) not long before his death.

== Selected publications ==
- Beritov, I.S. (1916) Uchenie ob osnovnykh elementakh tsentral’noi koordinatsii skeletnoi muskulaturi [Theory on Basic Elements of Central Coordination of Skeletal Musculature]. Petrograd, Stasyulevich printing-office.
- Beritoff, J.S. (1924). "On the fundamental nervous processes in the cortex of the cerebral hemispheres. I. The principal stages of the development of the individual reflex: its generalization and differentiation". Brain. 47 (2): 109–148. doi:10.1093/brain/47.2.109.
- Beritoff, J.S. (1924). "On the fundamental nervous processes in the cortex of the cerebral hemispheres. II. On the principal cortical elements in the arcs of the individual reflexes". Brain. 47 (3): 358–376. doi:10.1093/brain/47.3.358.
- Beritoff, J.S. (1927). "Über die individuell-erworbene Tätigkeit des Zentralnervensystems". J. Psychol. Neurol. 33: 113–335.
- Beritov, I.S. (1932) Individual’no-priobretennaia deiatel’nost’ tsentral’noi nervnoi sistemy [Individually-Acquired Activity of the Central Nervous System]. Tiflis, State Printing House of Georgia.
- Beritov, I.S. (1947) Ob osnovnykh formakh nervnoi i psikhonervnoi deiatel’nosti [Concerning Basic Forms of Neural and Psychoneural Activity]. Moscow and Leningrad, Academy of Sciences of the USSR Press.
- Beritashvili, I.S. (Beritov) (1959) O nervnykh mekhanizmakh prostranstvennoi orientatsii vysshikh pozvonochnykh zhivotnykh. [Nervous Mechanisms of Spatial Orientation of Mammals]. Tbilisi, Georgian Academy of Sciences Press.
- Beritashvili, I.S. (1963). "Les mécanismes nerveux de l'orientation spatiale chez l'homme". Neuropsychologia. 1 (3): 233–249. doi:10.1016/0028-3932(63)90018-6.
- Beritashvili, I.S. (Beritoff)(1965) Neural Mechanisms of Higher Vertebrate Behavior. (Trans. and Ed. Liberson, W.T.) Little Brown & Co, Boston. (Original Russian, Tbilisi, 1961).
- Beritashvili, I.S. (1966). "Preparatory chapter: From the spinal coordination of movements to the psychoneural integration of behavior". Annu. Rev. Physiol. 28: 1–16. doi:10.1146/annurev.ph.28.030166.000245. PMID 5322976.
- Beritashvili, I.S. (Beritoff) (1969) Concerning psychoneural activity of animals. In: Cole M, Maltzman I, eds., A Handbook of Contemporary Soviet Psychology. New York and London, Basic Books, chapter 22, pp. 627–670.
- Beritashvili, I.S. (1971) Vertebrate Memory. Characteristics and Origin [Pamiat’ pozvonochnykh zhivotnykh, ee kharakteristika i proiskhozhdeni] (Trans. J.S. Barlow, Еd. W.T. Liberson). NY, Plenum Press. (Original Russian, Tbilisi, 1968).
- Beritashvili, I.S. (Beritoff) (1972) Phylogeny of memory development in vertebrates. In: Karczmar AG, Eccles JC, eds., Brain and Behavior. New York, Springer-Verlag, pp. 341–351.
- Beritashvili, I.S. (1974) Pamiat’ pozvonochnykh zhivotnykh, ee kharakteristika i proiskhozhdenie. [Vertebrate Animal Memory. Characteristics and Origin], 2nd revised and enlarged edition. Moscow, Nauka.
- Beritashvili, I.S. (1975) Izbrannye Trudy: Neirofiziologiia i neiropsikhologiia [Selected Works: Neurophysiology and Neuropsychology]. Moscow, Nauka.
- Beritashvili, I.S. (1984) Trudy: Voprosy Fiziologii Myshts, Neirofiziologii, Neiropsikhologii' [Works: Problems of Muscle Physiology, Neurophysiology and Neuropsychology]. Tbilisi, Metsniereba.
