= Georgian Technical University =

Technical university in Tbilisi, Georgia

Coordinates: 41°43′01″N 44°46′41″E

- საქართველოს ტექნიკური უნივერსიტეტი
- Coat of Arms of GTU
- Latin: GEORGIAE UNIVERSITAS RERUM TECHNICI
- Motto: Knowledge is power Latin: Scientia Potestas Est Georgian: ცოდნა ძალაა
- Type: Public
- Established: January 16, 1922; 104 years ago
- Head: David Gurgenidze
- Academic staff: 8
- Undergraduates: 20,000
- Postgraduates: 3,000
- Location: Tbilisi, Georgia
- Campus: 9
- Member of: EUA
- Colors: White & Dark Red
- Website: www.gtu.ge

University rankings

Global – Overall
- QS World: 1001-1200 (2026)

Regional – Overall
- QS Emerging Europe and Central Asia: 251-300 (2022)

Georgian Technical University (GTU, formerly V.I. Lenin Georgian Polytechnical Institute) is the main and largest technical university of Georgia. It is located in the capital city of Tbilisi.

== History ==
Georgian Technical University was founded in 1922 as a polytechnic faculty of the Tbilisi State University. The first lecture was read by Georgian mathematician Professor Andrea Razmadze.

Transformed in 1928 into an independent "Georgian Politechnical Institute" it achieved University status by 1990.

== Faculties and departments ==
All faculty deans and heads of departments are full professors.

- Faculty of Civil Engineering (Acting Dean: Zurab Gvishiani)
1. Department of Mechanical Engineering
2. Department of Civil and Industrial Engineering
3. Department of Hydro-Engineering
- Faculty of Power Engineering and Telecommunications (Acting Dean: Elene Shatakishvili)
1. Department of Telecommunication
2. Department of Thermal and Hydro-Power Engineering
3. Department of Electric Power Engineering, Electrics and Electromechanics
- Faculty of Mining and Geology (Dean: Anzor Abshilava)
1. Department of Geodesy Engineering
2. Department of Mining Technology
3. Department of Geology
4. Department of Oil and Gas Technology
- Faculty of Chemical Technology and Metallurgy (Dean: Nugzar Tsereteli)
1. Department of Chemical Technology and Biotechnology
2. Department of Metallurgy, Metals Science and Metal
- Faculty of Architecture, Urban Planning and Design (Dean: Nino Imnadze)
1. Department of Architecture and Urbanistics
2. Department of Theory and Basics of Architecture
- Faculty of Informatics and Control Systems (Dean: Zurab Tsveraidze)
1. Department of Artificial Intelligence
2. Department of Computer Engineering
3. Department of Cybernetics Engineering and Instrument-Making
4. Department of Organizational Control
5. Department of Physics
6. Department of Mathematics
- Faculty of Transportation and Machine-Building (Dean: Otar Gelashvili)
1. Department of Machine-Building
2. Department of Transportation
3. Department of Roads
4. Department of Graphics Engineering and Technical Mechanics
- Faculty of Business Technologies (Dean: Rusudan Kutateladze)
- Faculty of Engineering Economics, Media-Technology and Social Sciences (Dean Ivane Jagodnishvili)
- Faculty of Law and International Relations (Dean Irakli Gabisonia)
- International Design School (Dean Nikoloz Shavishvili)
- Faculty of Agricultural Sciences and Bio-systems Engineering (Dean Giga Qvartskhava)

== Structure ==
- Rector of the Technical University of Georgia — David Gurgenidze (Doctor of Technical Sciences, Professor )
- Vice-Rector — Levan Klimiashvili (Doctor of Technical Sciences, Professor )
- Deputy Rector for Research — Zurab Gasitashvili (Doctor of Technical Sciences, Professor )
- Head of the Administration (Chancellor) — Karlo Kopaliani (Doctor of Social Sciences)
- Head of the Quality Assurance Service — Irma Inashvili
- Perspective Development Office — Tamaz Batsikadze (Doctor of Technical Sciences, Full Professor )
- International Relations and Standards Office — Otar Zumburidze (Doctor of Technical Sciences, Professor )
- Academic Council — David Gurgenidze, Rector of the Technical University of Georgia
- Council of Representatives (Senate) — Jemal Gakhokhidze (Doctor of Political Science)

=== Structural Units ===
- Department of Education | Head of the Department - Tamar Tsereteli
- Department of Sciences | Head of the Department – David Tavkhelidze
- Department of Commercialization | Head of the Department – Mamuka Matsaberidze
- University Library | Director - Vazha Papaskiri
- Logistic Department | Head of the Department - Nikoloz Nebieridze
- Human Resource Management | Head of the Section - Khatuna Chkhikvishvili
- Chancellery | Head of the Chancellery - Eliko Okhanashvili
- Section of Law | Head of the Section- Beka Maisuradze
- Planning-Finance Section | Head of the Section –
- Accounting Section | Head of the Section - Tamaz Urtmelidze
- Life-Long Learning and Correspondence Education | Head of the Section – Lali Gogeliani
- Publishing House "Technical University" | Chairman of the Guardian Council – Marina Medzmariashvili
- Students and Alumni Relations, Sport and Culture Section | Head of the Section - Revaz Gurgenidze
- Information Technologies Section | Head of the Section - David Chikovani
- Geoecology Monitoring Section | Head of the Section – Dimitri Abzianidze
- Diplomas Sector | Head of the Sector - Roseta Mgaloblishvili
- Archive | Head of the Archive - Rusudan Tatarashvili
- Military Mobilization Sector | Head of the Sector - Nino Chubinidze
- Monitoring Group | Head of the Group – David Gorgidze
- Purchasing Group | Head of theGroup – Eka Ivanishvili
- Scientific-Technological Centre for Sensory Electronics and Materials Sciences | Head of theCentre – Merab Tabutsadze
- Polytechnic Museum | Director – Manana Tevzadze

== Organization ==
Georgian Technical University has more than 22 000 students and around 2 500 faculty and staff members. Major faculties of the university are as follows:

- Civil Engineering
- Power Engineering and Telecommunication
- Mining and Geology
- Chemical Technology and Metallurgy
- Architecture, Urban planning and Design
- Informatics and Control Systems;
- Transportation and Machine-Building
- Humanities and Social

Georgian Technical University has provided over 60% of Georgia's engineering, chemistry and scientific industry specialists for the last eighty years. While its major counterpart Tbilisi State University focuses on popular specialties like Civil Law or Economics, GTU continues its fine tradition of providing technical specialists to the industry and exact sciences. Additionally, over the recent years GTU added more establishments, "Caucasus Business School" — A joint project of GTU, Tbilisi State University and Georgia State University (Atlanta, Georgia, USA), German Studies faculty, a Franco-Georgian Studies Faculty and a "Cisco Networking Academy". GTU also has thirteen offspring institutes all over the country.

GTU uses the ECTS grading scale and awards degrees and diplomas in Diploma of Specialist, Bachelor of Science, Bachelor of Arts, and Master of Science. The first three degrees require four to four-and-one-half years of full-time studies; the Master of Sciences degree requires a year-and-one-half to two years of full-time studies. Most students (apart from those in humanities or arts specialties) undergo rigorous training in mathematics and fundamental sciences while studying at the GTU. GTU is known for its strong ties with "Andrea Razmadze Institute of Mathematics of Georgia", the leading mathematical research institute in Transcaucasia.

GTU also awards scientific Ph.D.s that require three or more years of advanced studies depending on specialty.

All degrees are also provided as part-time and distance studies; these may take much longer to complete.

GTU's scientific library is one of the largest libraries in Georgia, comprising 1,254,000 books of which many are unique and rare finds, and 500,000 periodic materials. Plans are underway for digitizing this large collection of knowledge.

== Notable alumni and faculty ==
- Anahit Ananyan (1909–1987), Armenian agronomist
- Irakli Khakhubia (1971–2022), Georgian politician
- Rusudana Nikoladze (1884–1981), Georgian chemist and educator
- Tinatin Sadunishvili (born 1952), Georgian biologist and academic
