= Georgian National Academy of Sciences =

National science academy

Coordinates: 41°42′11″N 44°47′27″E

Georgian Academy of Sciences, Tbilisi

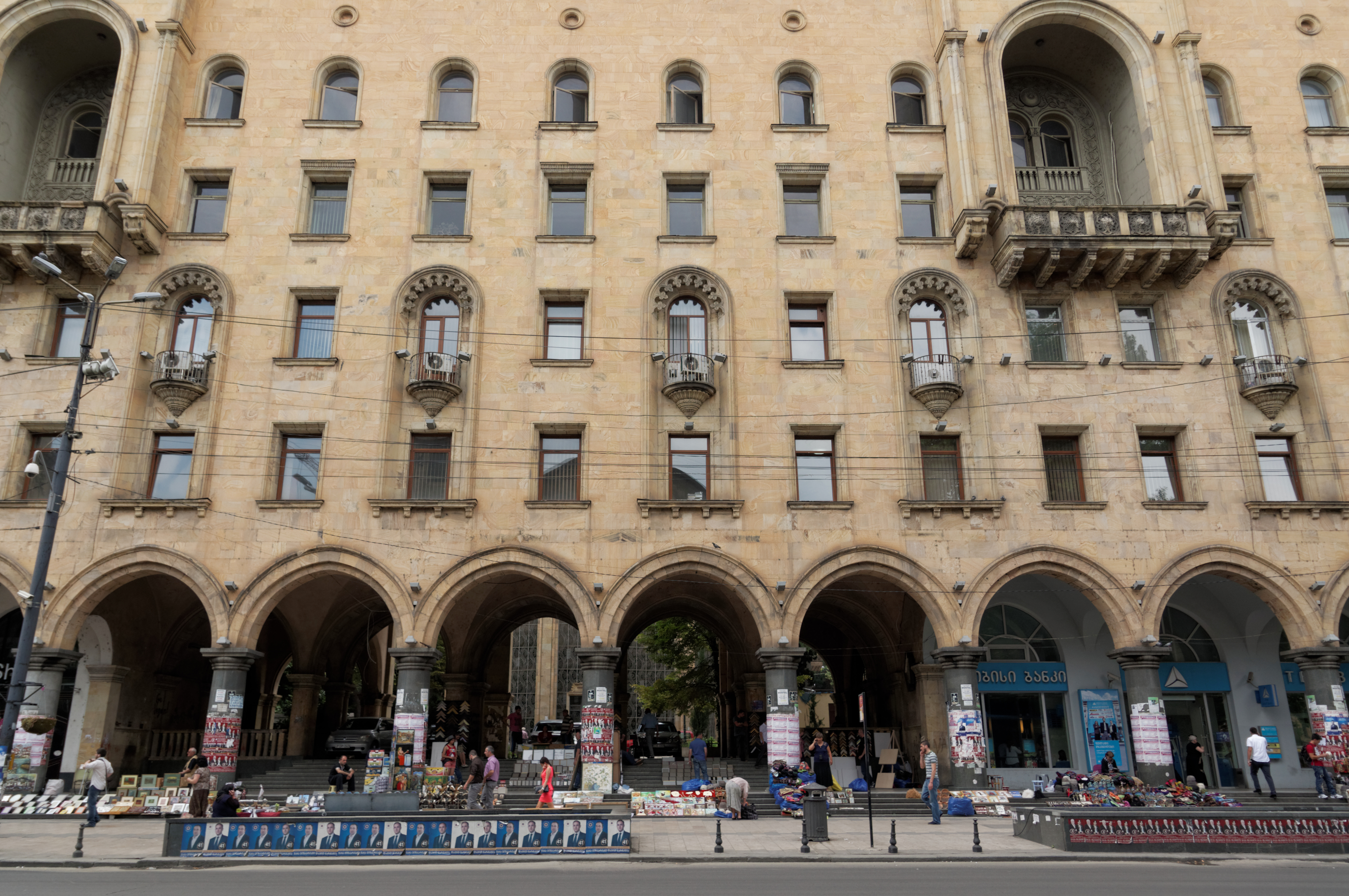
Arches

The Georgian National Academy of Sciences (GNAS) (Georgian: საქართველოს მეცნიერებათა ეროვნული აკადემია, romanized: sakartvelos metsnierebata erovnuli ak'ademia) is the main learned society of Georgia. It was named the Georgian SSR Academy of Sciences until November 1990. The Academy coordinates scientific research in Georgia and develops relationships with the academies and scientific centers of foreign countries.

== History ==
GNAS was established in February 1941, in Tbilisi. It integrates 9 scientific research institutions of the Georgian branch of the All-Soviet Academy of Sciences, as well as the Georgian National Museum, the Geological Institute, the I. Beritashvili Institute of Physiology, etc., a total of 14 scientific research institutions, covering linguistics, physiology, mathematics, botany, geology and other fields, divided into the Department of Mathematics and Natural Sciences and the Department of Social Sciences. The founder Academicians of the Academy were Giorgi Akhvlediani (linguistics), Ivane Beritashvili (physiology), Arnold Chikobava (Ibero-Caucasian languages), Giorgi Chubinashvili (arts), Simon Janashia (history), Alexander Janelidze (geology), Korneli Kekelidze (philology), Niko Ketskhoveli (botany), Tarasi Kvaratskhelia (subtropical cultures), Niko Muskhelishvili (mathematics, mechanics; first President of the Academy), Ilia Vekua (mathematics; second President of the Academy), Akaki Shanidze (linguistics), Alexander Tvalchrelidze (mineralogy), Dimitri Uznadze (psychology), Kiriak Zavriev (constructive mechanics) and Philip Zaitsev (zoology).

Other notable members of the Academy include Ekvtime Takaishvili (history), Sergi Jikia (turkology), Shalva Nutsubidze (philosophy), Giorgi Tsereteli (oriental studies), Simon Kaukhchishvili (classical philology), Rene Schmerling (art history), Konstantine Gamsakhurdia (literature), Giorgi Melikishvili (history), Nikoloz Berdzenishvili (history), Revaz Dogonadze (physics), Malkhaz Abdushelishvili (anthropology), Guram Mchedlidze (paleobiology), and Levan Chilashvili (archaeology).

== Current members ==
Since 2023, the members of the Academy Presidium are: Roin Metreveli (president), Ramaz Khurodze (vicepresident), Vladimer Papava (secretary), Tamaz Chelidze (Earth sciences), Elizbar Javelidze (language, literature and art), George Japaridze (mathematics and physics), Ramaz Khetsuriani (physiology and medicine), Avtandil Korakhashvili (agricultural sciences), Tinatin Sadunishvili (biological sciences), Elguja Medzmariashvili (engineering sciences and information technology), Vladimer Tsitsishvili (chemistry and chemical sciences), Liana Melikishvili (social sciences), Khvedri Inasaridze, Joni Khetsuriani, Giorgi Kvesitadze, David Gurgenidze, Jaba Samushia and Tamaz Shilakadze.

Presidents of the Georgian National Academy of Sciences: Niko Muskhelishvili (1941–1972), Ilia Vekua (1972–1977), Evgeni Kharadze (1977–1986), Albert Tavkhelidze (1986–2005), Tamaz V. Gamkrelidze (2005–2013), Giorgi Kvesitadze (2013-2023), and Roin Metreveli (2023- ).

== Affiliations ==
GNAS is a National Scientific Associate of the International Council for Science (ICSU, France).

Among other science academies of Georgia are: the Abkhazian Regional Academy of Sciences (founded in 1995, in Tbilisi), the Georgian Academy of Agrarian Sciences (founded in 1991, in Tbilisi), and the Georgian Academy of Bio-Medical Sciences. By the GNAS is recognized also the Georgian National Section of Euroscience (ESGNS).
