= Kote Abkhazi =

Georgian military officer and politician

Prince Konstantine (Kote) Abkhazi
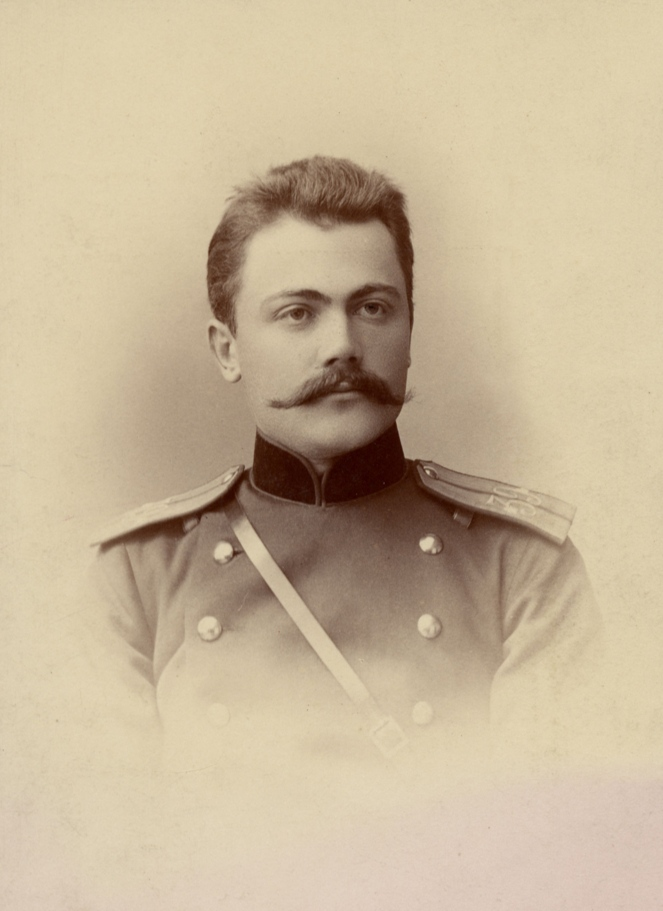
- Born: November 17, 1867; Kardenakhi, Kakheti, Russian Empire (now Georgia)
- Died: May 20, 1923 (aged 55); Tbilisi, Georgian SSR
- Education: Cadet Corps in Tbilisi. St. Petersburg's Military Academy
- Occupations: Commander, Politician and Public figure
- Known for: General-major of Artillery in the Tsar's army (1916) and in the national army of the Democratic Republic of Georgia (1918). Chairman of the Georgian National-Democratic Party.

Prince Konstantine (Kote) Abkhazi (Georgian: კონსტანტინე (კოტე) აფხაზი) (November 17, 1867 – May 20, 1923), was a Georgian military officer, politician and public figure. During the Imperial Russian rule, he was a General-major of Artillery in the Tsar's Imperial Russian Army (1916) and in the national army of the Democratic Republic of Georgia (1918), and a recognized leader of the liberal nobility of Georgia. After the Soviet Occupation of Georgia, he emerged as one of the leaders of an underground anti-Soviet, national-liberation movement. One of the founders of the Tbilisi State University in 1918 and Chairman of the Georgian National-Democratic Party in 1921–1923. In 1923, he was arrested and executed by the Soviet security police (so-called "Cheka"). In 2023, he was posthumously awarded the title and Order of National Hero of Georgia.

== Early life and career ==
Prince Konstantine (Kote) Abkhazi was born in the village of Kardenakhi, Kakheti (Eastern Georgia), to a wealthy aristocratic family, the son of the General-major of the tsarist Russian army, Prince Nikoloz (Niko) Abkhazi and Princess Nino née Chavchavadze, the sister of an outstanding Georgian writer and public figure Ilia Chavchavadze.

Abkhazi graduated from the Tbilisi Cadet Corps and the St. Petersburg Military Academy and joined the Imperial Russian Army in 1890. Later, he was actively involved in Georgia's public life and sponsored several social and economic projects, including the construction of the Kakhetian railway between 1906 and 1913. In 1913, he was elected the marshal of nobility of the Tiflis Governorate, but he was called to an active army service with the outbreak of World War I in 1914. Being promoted to major general in 1916, he commanded an artillery brigade from 1914 to 1916. In 1916, he was elected to the State Duma of the Russian Empire for Tiflis.

== Revolution ==
Returning to Georgia, he was reelected the marshal and helped found the National Democratic Party of Georgia in 1917. Under his leadership, the Georgian nobility declared its property national. Abkhazi was involved in the establishment of Tbilisi State University in February 1918, and in the proclamation of independence of the Democratic Republic of Georgia in May 1918. In 1917–1919 he was a Member of the National Council of Georgia. He became a Chairman of the National-Democratic Party in 1921. Early in 1921, Georgia was invaded and occupied by Soviet Russia's Red Army, forcing the Georgian government to flee the country. Abkhazi stayed in Georgia, however, and joined the underground movement Committee for Independence of Georgia where he headed its Military Center. He guided the organization of guerrilla groups in Pshavi-Khevsureti, and Kakheti (1921–23). However, in March 1923, Abkhazi and 14 other members of the Military Center (Alexander Andronikashvili, Varden Tsulukidze, Colonel Giorgi Khimshiashvili, Rostom Muskhelishvili, Mikheil Zandukeli, Simon Bagration, Parnaoz Karalashvili, Iason Kereselidze, Ivane Kutateladze, Simon Chiabrishvili, Alexandre Machavariani, Elizbar Gulisashvili, Levan Klimiashvili and Dimitri Chrdileli) were arrested by the GPU, and were shot for anti-Soviet activities on May 20, 1923. He is quoted to have said prior to the execution:

I’m dying with joy, because I’m given an honor to be sacrificed for Georgia. My death will bring victory to Georgia!

Abkhazi's son, Prince Nicholas (1900–1987) and his Shanghai-born spouse Peggy Pemberton Carter (died 1994) moved to Canada and, beginning from 1946, built a well-known "Abkhazi Garden" at Vancouver Island, Victoria, British Columbia.

== See also ==
- August uprising
- Sardion Tevzadze
- Simon Mchedlidze

== Literature ==
- (in Georgian) Ushangi Sidamonidze (1997), "Abkhazi, Konstantine". Encyclopedia "Sakartvelo", vol. I, Tbilisi, pp. 256–257.
- (in Georgian) Journal "Samshoblo", No: 21-22, Paris, 1937.
- (in Georgian) Journal "Mkhedari", Paris, No: 2, 1929, pp. 22–23.
- Alexander Mikaberidze (2007), Abkhazi, Constantine. The Dictionary of Georgian National Biography.
- (in Georgian) Levan Urushadze (2012), "For the Biography of General Konstantine (Kote) Abkhazi". Bulletin of the Georgian National Museum, Series of Social Sciences, No 3(48-B), pp. 230–246.
