= Noe Khomeriki =

Georgian politician

- ნოე ხომერიკი
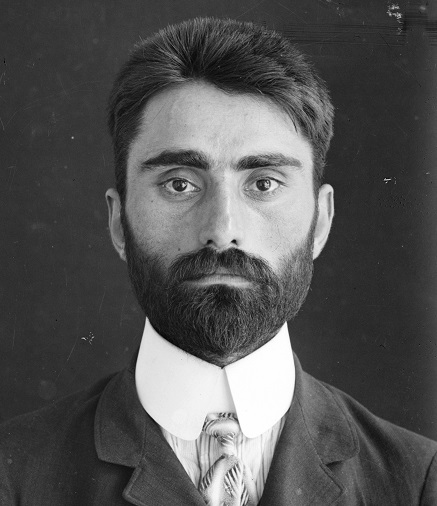
- Born: January 1, 1883; Shroma, Guria, Kutais Governorate, Imperial Russia
- Died: September 1, 1924 (aged 41); Rostov, USSR
- Cause of death: Execution by firing squad
- Occupation: politician
- Political party: Georgian Social Democratic Menshevik Party
- Movement: Committee for Independence of Georgia
- Opponent: Red Army
- Spouse: Ana Nikolaishvili
- Children: Victor Khomeriki

Noe Khomeriki (Georgian: ნოე ხომერიკი; 1 January 1883 – 1 September 1924) was a Georgian politician involved in the Social Democrat movement who was arrested for anti-soviet activity and shot during an uprising against the Soviet state.

== Biography ==
Born in the small village of Shroma, in the province of Guria (then part of Kutais Governorate, Imperial Russia), he engaged in local peasant movement and was a member of the Georgian Social Democratic (Menshevik) Party. He played a prominent role in the 1903-06 Gurian Republic, the first social-democratic self-governing territory within the Russian Empire. After the Russian Revolution of 1917, Georgia became an independent democratic republic in 1918 and Khomeriki was elected to the Constituent Assembly of Georgia. He then assumed the position of Minister for Agriculture in the Georgian government. During his tenure, Khomeriki authored a successful land reform (January 1919), which redistributed the land as private property, retaining only forests, rivers and some pastureland as state property. The Red Army invasion forced the Georgian cabinet into exile to France where Khomeriki remained a member of the Government of the Democratic Republic of Georgia in exile. In 1922, he secretly returned to Georgia to supervise the Committee for Independence of Georgia, an underground anti-Soviet organization. However, he was arrested by the Cheka in 1923 and shot during the 1924 purge in Georgia.

== See also ==
- Sardion Tevzadze
- Simon Mchedlidze
- Samson Dadiani
- Konstantine Andronikashvili

== Works ==
- N. Khomeriki, La Réforme agraire et l’économie rurale en Géorgie: Rapport au Congrès du Parti Social-Democrate de Géorgie, en juillet 1920 (Paris, 1921).

== Quotes ==
- "Comrade Koba told you that we were against you and demanded your sacking from the Committee, but I promise nothing of the sort happened and everything Koba told you was a malicious lie! Yes: a calumny to discredit us! I just wonder at the man's impudence. I know how worthless he is, but I didn't expect such 'courage.' But it turns out that he'll use any means if he thinks the ends justify them. The end in this case - the ambition - is to present himself as a great man before the nation. But... God didn't grant him the right gifts, so he has to resort to intrigues, lies and other 'bagatelles.' Such a filthy person wanted to pollute our sacred mission with sewage!"—Khomeriki's assessment of Joseph Stalin in a 1904 letter to a member of the Social Democratic Central Committee for the Caucasus region. Quoted by Simon Sebag Montefiore, Young Stalin, page 125.
