= Evgen Gvaladze =

Georgian politician and independence activist

Evgen (Geno) Gvaladze (Georgian: ევგენ (გენო) ღვალაძე) (May 13, 1900 – October 15, 1937) was a Georgian lawyer, journalist and politician, and one of the leaders of the anti-Soviet national-liberation movement in Georgia of 1921-1937.

He was born in a small village Sveri near the mining town of Chiatura, Imereti (Western Georgia), into the family of a Georgian retired cavalry officer Artem Gvaladze (1862-1918). Gvaladze was a descendant of David II, King of imereti in 1784-1790.

Having graduated from the Gymnasium at the Tbilisi State University in 1920, he joined the National Army of the Democratic Republic of Georgia in July, 1920 and took part in the battles against the invading Red and Turkish armies in Kojory-Tabakhmela (near Tbilisi) and Batumi in February–March, 1921. On February 20, 1921 Gvaladze was decorated with the Military Cross of "Tetri Giorgi" ("White Giorgi").

After the Bolshevik takeover of the Georgian government, he was demobilized. In 1926 Gvaladze graduated from the Department of Law of the Social-Economic Faculty of the Tbilisi State University (TSU). Since April, 1921 he was involved in the underground activities of the Georgian Menshevik Party to which he was a member in 1917-1923.

In 1926-1932 Gvaladze was a member of the Board of the Defending Lawyers of Georgia, and lectured at the Pedagogical Institute in Gori from 1935 to 1937. His articles were systematically published in the Georgian press of 1916-1928. In 1921-1932 Gvaladzes journalistic papers were published in the Georgian emigrant press also ("Tavisupali Sakartvelo", "Tetri Giorgi", etc. Pseudonyms: "G.", "Geno", etc.). In spite of continuing social activity under the Soviet government, he never abandoned his political positions and led, from 1926, the underground conspirative group of the Georgian national political organization Tetri Giorgi. Earlier, on May 26, 1922, on the fourth anniversary of the independence of Georgia, he was one of the organizers of the first mass anti-Soviet demonstration in Tbilisi and was arrested by the GPU. In 1923, he joined an underground anti-Bolshevik bloc of the Georgian political opposition known as the Committee for Independence of Georgia and represented it in the Kakheti district where he was involved in preparation of an armed rebellion in August, 1924. He was arrested on September 5, 1924, but was released due to a declared amnesty in March, 1925. On August 10, 1937, during the Great Purge, he was rearrested along with his associates from the "Tetri Giorgi" conspirative group and shot in Tbilisi on October 15, 1937.

== See also ==
- Konstantine Andronikashvili
