= Georgi Atarbekov =

Armenian Bolshevik/Soviet security police official

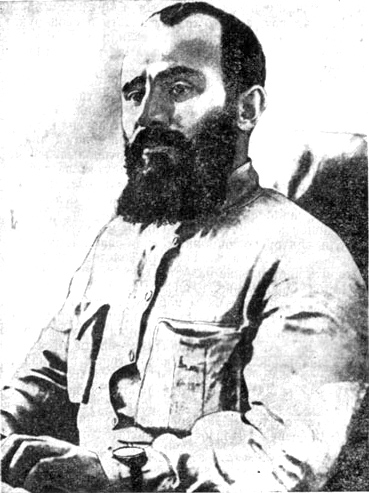
Georgi Atarbekov

Georgiy Aleksandrovich Atarbekov (Russian: Георгий Александрович Атарбеков; born Atarbekyan; March 2, 1891 – March 22, 1925) was an Armenian Bolshevik and Soviet security police official.

== Biography ==
Atarbekov was born in Echmiadzin (near Yerevan, Armenia), then part of the Russian Empire. He described himself as the son of a tradesman, and according to his obituary, his mother was so poor that they sent him as a child to live with relatives in Baku. Atarbekov joined the Russian Social Democratic Labour Party in 1908 and studied at the Moscow University from 1910 to 1911, and was arrested for his political activities. He was arrested again in Tiflis on the outbreak of war in 1914, but escaped. During the Russian Revolution of 1917 and the ensuing Russian Civil War, he took part in the Bolshevik attempts at gaining footholds in Alexandropol and Sukhumi. In 1918, he was transferred to Astrakhan, where Sergei Kirov was chairman of the military revolutionary committee. In 1919, he was appointed chairman of the North Caucasus Cheka and took part in fighting with the White Russian forces and the Muslim insurgents in the region. Afterwards he served as a VeCheKa plenipotentiary in Kuban, and Baku. In 1921, he was transferred to Armenia, to direct the suppression of the Dashnaks, and finally, after the final sovietization of the Caucasus, received a post of People's Commissar for Post and Telegraph in the Transcaucasian government.

== Personality ==
An ally of Joseph Stalin and – in the words of the modern British scholar Donald Rayfield – "Stalin's favourite killer of the Caucasus", Atarbekov acquired a reputation for exceptional violence during the civil war. On 31 October 1918, he chaired a session of Cheka which ordered the execution of 47 prisoners. He ordered the mass killing of hostages in Pyatigorsk on 1 November 1918, and boasted afterwards that he had personally stabbed General Nikolai Ruzsky to death.. He also machine-gunned a train-load of Georgian doctors and nurses returning to Georgia from the World War I fronts.

In July 1919, Atarbekov was removed from office and subsequently taken to Moscow under escort after the leader of the Astrakhan Bolsheviks, Mina Aristov had complained about his brutality. An initial investigation found against him, but Stalin and Kirov interceded for him, and arranged for his promotion and posting in the North Caucasus.

== Death ==
In March 1925, together with Solomon Mogilevsky and Alexander Miasnikian, Atarbekov boarded a plane from Tiflis to meet Trotsky who was in convalescence in Sukhum. But the plane caught fire while in the air. Atarbekov was killed along with Mogilevsky, Miasnikian, the pilot and flight engineer. According to eyewitness reports, people were seen jumping to their deaths on fire to escape the burning plane. According to one version, the young Georgian airman who was piloting the plane crashed it deliberately, killing himself and his high-ranking passengers to avenge the heavy-handed suppression of the 1924 revolt in the Georgian SSR. Another hypothesis suggests Lavrenty Beria’s role in arranging the catastrophe.
