= Tevzadze =

Tevzadze (Georgian: თევზაძე) is a Georgian family name predominantly found in the Imereti and Guria regions in Central Western Georgia, and due to migration also prevalent in the capital Tbilisi. It is especially common in the town of Samtredia where it the second most common surname, and in the cities of Kutaisi, Batumi and Rustavi.

== Notable people ==
- Sardion Tevzadze (1882 – 1924), member of parliament
- Valerian Tevzadze (1894–1987), soldier
- David Tevzadze (born 1949), soldier
