= Ambrosius of Georgia =

Catholicos-Patriarch of All Georgia (1921–1927)

His Holiness and Beatitude Ambrose
- The Catholicos-Patriarch of All Georgia, Archbishop of Mtskheta-Tbilisi
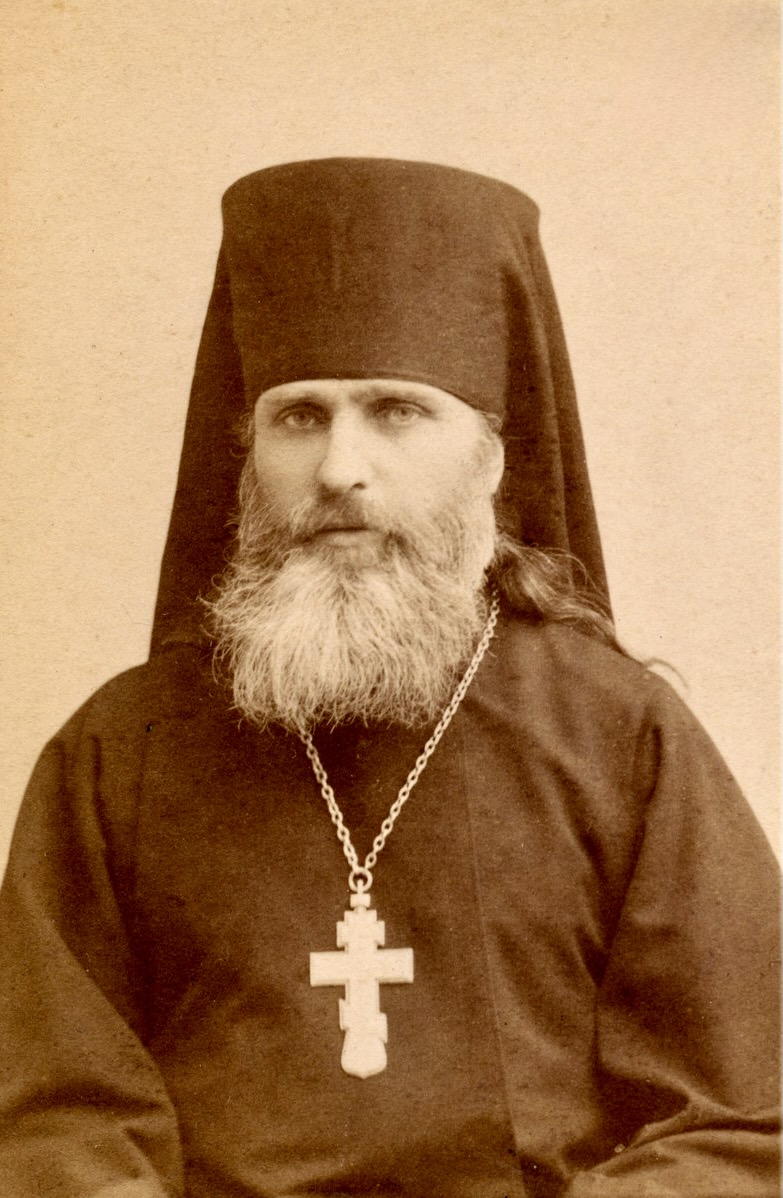
- Church: Georgian Orthodox Church
- Installed: October 14, 1921
- Term ended: March 29, 1927
- Predecessor: Leonide
- Successor: Christophorus III

Orders
- Ordination: 1885

Personal details
- Born: Besarion Zosime Khelaia; September 7, 1861 Martvili, Kutais Governorate, Caucasus Viceroyality. Russian Empire
- Died: March 29, 1927 (aged 65) Tbilisi, Georgian SSR, Soviet Union
- Denomination: Eastern Orthodox Church
- Occupation: Catholicos-Patriarch

St. Ambrosius (Georgian: ამბროსი, Ambrosi) (September 7, 1861 – March 29, 1927) was a Georgian religious figure and scholar who served as the Catholicos-Patriarch of All Georgia from 1921 to 1927. Best known for his opposition to the Soviet regime, he was canonized in 1995 by the Georgian Orthodox Church as Saint Ambrosius the Confessor (ამბროსი აღმსარებელი, Ambrosi Aghmsarebeli).

== Early life and career ==
Ambrosius was born as Besarion Khelaia (ბესარიონ ხელაია) in Martvili, Georgia, then part of Imperial Russia. He graduated from the Tiflis Theological Seminary in 1885 and was ordained to the priesthood in Abkhazia where he served as a priest in Sukhumi, New Athos, and Lykhny, and also delivered courses in the Georgian language. Under the pseudonym of Amber, he published a series of articles denouncing the policy of Russification in Abkhazia and accusing local Russian officials of fomenting anti-Georgian sentiments among the Abkhaz people. In 1896, he enrolled into the Kazan Theological Academy, from which he graduated in 1900, having authored a thesis, "the Struggle of Christianity against Islam in Georgia." Tonsured a Hieromonk in 1901, he returned in Georgia where he was made an archimandrite at the Chelishi Monastery in the province of Racha. In 1904, he was transferred to the Synodal Office in Tbilisi, and became an archimandrite of the Monastery of the Transfiguration.

== Autocephalist movement ==
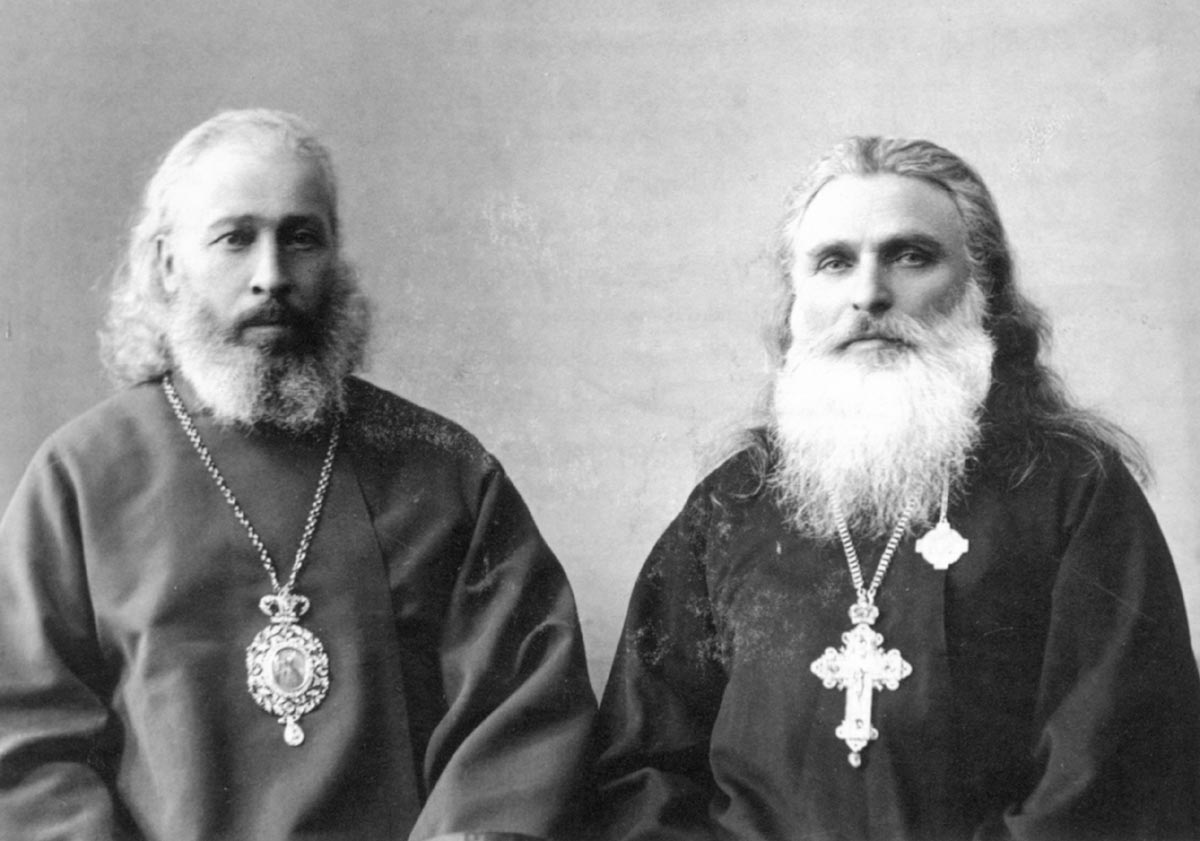
St. Ambrosius and Kyrion II.

In the 1900s, during the heated debates concerning the status of the Georgian church, he emerged as one of the leaders of the Georgian autocephalist movement, calling for the restoration of the autocephalous (independent) Orthodox Church of Georgia abolished by Imperial Russia in 1811. Waged for the most part in the press and church committees, the struggle peaked during the Russian Revolution of 1905 and occasionally evolved into violent clashes. The Georgian bishops pointed out that under the Russian exarches sent down from St. Petersburg to run Georgia's ecclesiastic affairs, the Georgian church lost some 140 million rubles’ worth of property and estates; church schools had been closed down, and the use of Georgian in the liturgy discouraged; twenty episcopal sees lay vacant and seven hundred and forty parishes were without pastors. The Georgians sent an appeal to the tsar, but nothing came of this. Autocephaly was denied. The conference of Georgian clergy which met at Tbilisi in 1905 was dispersed by police and several "autocephalists" were arrested. Ambrosius was banned from celebrating the liturgy and confined in the Troitsky Monastery at Ryazan. The struggle culminated in 1908, when the Russian Exarch of Georgia, Archbishop Nikon, was murdered on May 28 at his residence in Tbilisi by unidentified assassins, allegedly by a Georgian nationalist. No one was ever tried or convicted for the murder, and although the links of the Georgian autocephalists to the crime remained unclear, the initial police investigation concluded they had been behind the murder of Nikon, and the Russian authorities used the situation as a pretext for removing Georgian bishops from their posts. Ambrosius was also suspended from serving and deported to Russia. He was acquitted in 1910, but it was not until the 1917 events when he was allowed to return to Georgia. Although the Georgian autocephalist movement earned worldwide sympathies, the dispute dragged on indecisively for years, until the outbreak of World War I relegated it temporarily to the background.

The 1917 February Revolution in the Russian Empire and the ensuing turmoil in both church and state gave an opportunity to the Georgian Church to reassert its autocephalous status. On March 12, 1917, a group of Georgian clergymen proclaimed the autocephaly of their Church and elected Bishop Kyrion as Catholicos Patriarch. The Most Holy Synod of the Russian Orthodox Church refused to recognize the move, and the result was a break in communion between the two Churches. Ambrosius was soon consecrated Metropolitan of Chkondidi, western Georgia, and then transferred to Abkhazia.

== Catholicos Patriarch of All Georgia ==
The Soviet invasion of Georgia from February to March 1921 brought a short-lived independent Democratic Republic of Georgia to an end. Soon the Catholicos Patriarch Leonid died of cholera, and, on October 14, 1921, Ambrosius was elected as his successor.

Under the newly established Bolshevik regime, the Church was deprived of juridical status, and churches and monasteries began to be closed. The clergy was persecuted and the property of the churches and monasteries confiscated.

On February 7, 1922, Ambrosius addressed a memorandum to the Genoa Conference, in which he described the conditions under which Georgia was living since the Red Army invasion, protested in the name of the people of Georgia, deprived of their rights, against the Soviet occupation and demanded the intervention of civilized humanity to oppose the atrocities of the Bolshevik regime. In February 1923, Ambrosius and all members of the Patriarchal Council were arrested and put into prison by the Bolsheviks.

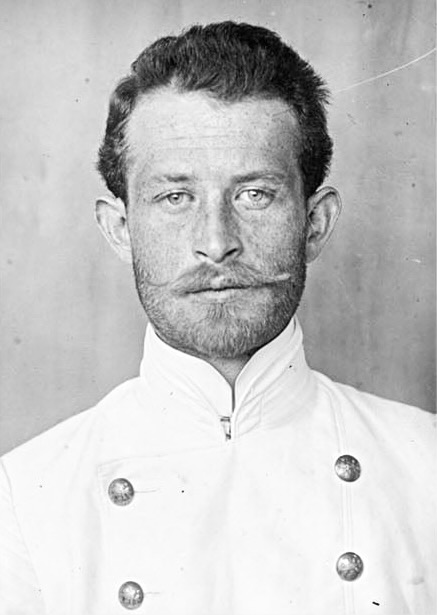
Samson Dadiani, Georgian lawyer who was part of a group defending the patriarch during show trials

In March 1924, the Soviet authorities staged a humiliating public trial. Besides sending an appeal to the Genoa Conference, Ambrosi was also accused of concealing of the historic treasures of the Church to preserve them from passing into the hands of the Soviet state. Ambrosius' defense team included Samson Dadiani, who had himself faced persecution. All the clerics arrested along with the Patriarch, showed their solidarity with Ambrosius, who assumed the entire responsibility for his acts, which he declared to have been in conformity with his obligations and with the tradition of the Church of Georgia. His concluding words were: "My soul belongs to God, my heart to my country; you, my executioners, do what you will with my body." Ambrosi was expected to be sentenced to death, but the Communists did not dare to execute him and condemned him to eight years imprisonment while his property was confiscated.

Shortly afterwards, the 1924 August Uprising broke out in several regions of Georgia against the Soviet Union and lasted for three weeks. Approximately 3,000 died in fighting, more than 12,000 were executed and 20,000 deported to Siberia. A number of clerics were also purged, Archbishop Nazari of Kutatisi and Gaenati being among those who were shot without a trial.

The extent of the Red Terror in Georgia and a public outcry caused by it forced the Soviets to relatively moderate their pressure on Georgia's society in the following years. In early March 1925 the Chairman of the All-Union Executive Committee, Mikhail Kalinin, visited Georgia and called for the amnesty of the participants of the August 1924 insurrection, and for the suspension of religious persecutions. In 1926, Ambrosi and several other clerics were released from prisons. He did not live much longer, however, and died on March 29, 1927, in Tbilisi.

Ambrosius is also a known as a prolific historian of church and researcher of primary Georgian sources. He authored a number of articles published in Russian and Georgian press, and discovered a hitherto unknown version of the medieval Georgian chronicle, Moktsevay Kartlisay ("The Conversion of Georgia") (the so-called Chelishi codex).

== Canonization ==
In 1995, the Holy Synod of the Georgian Orthodox Church canonized Ambrosius as the Holy Archpriest Ambrosius the Confessor and set March 16 (29, N.S.) as the day of his commemoration. In 2013, he was posthumously awarded the title and Order of National Hero of Georgia.

Eastern Orthodox Church titles
Preceded by Leonid	Catholicos-Patriarch of All Georgia; 1921–1927	Succeeded by Christophorus III
