= Simon Chiabrishvili =

Simon Chiabrishvili (Georgian: სიმონ ჭიაბრიშვილი; 1881 – May 20, 1923), was a Georgian politician, national-democrat and public figure. As a member of the anti-Soviet national-liberation movement in Georgia, he was arrested and executed by the Soviet security services.

== Early life and career ==
Simon Chiabrishvili was born in the town of Dusheti, Mtiuleti, Georgia.

== Death ==
On May 20, 1923, Chiabrishvili and fourteen other members of the Military Center for the Committee for the Independence of Georgia were shot on the orders of the Georgian Cheka.
