= Ioseb Iremashvili =

Ioseb Iremashvili (Georgian: იოსებ ირემაშვილი, German: Iosseb Iremaschwili, Russian: Иосиф Георгиевич Иремашвили, 1878–1945) was a Georgian politician and author. A boyhood friend, and later political adversary, of Joseph Stalin, he is primarily known for his book Stalin und die Tragödie Georgiens ("Stalin and the Tragedy of Georgia', Berlin, 1932), the first memoir of Stalin's childhood.

== Biography ==
Both Stalin and Iremashvili grew up in Gori, Georgia (then part of the Tiflis Governorate, Imperial Russia), where they attended a local church school. Later, they studied together at Tiflis Theological Seminary. A member of the Russian Social Democratic Labour Party, Iremashvili was involved in the revolutionary activities in Transcaucasia and joined the Menshevik faction which quickly became a dominant political force in Georgia. After 1917, he worked as a teacher at Tiflis and was elected to the Constituent Assembly of Georgia in 1919. In February 1921, the Soviet Russian Red Army invaded Georgia and put an end to its three-year independence. Iremashvili, like several other Georgian Mensheviks, was placed in the Metekhi prison, but was then released through the efforts of his sister who negotiated with Stalin during his visit to Tiflis in July 1921. In October 1921, sixty-two arrested Mensheviks, including Iremashvili, were deported to Germany where he was granted a political asylum. Having settled in Berlin, he engaged in Georgian émigré activities aimed at enlisting Europe’s support to the Georgian independence cause.

== Memoirs ==
In 1932, he published, in German, his memoirs, Stalin und die Tragödie Georgiens ("Stalin and the Tragedy of Georgia"). Published in emigration and immune to Soviet censure, the book, although hostile to Stalin, is considered the only independent contemporary account of Stalin's youth and his early years in Georgia, and has proven a vital source for Stalin biographers. In his memoirs, Iremashvili relates many details of the Gori life of Soso (Stalin's childhood name), with particular emphasis of his brutal treatment at the hands of his father, Vissarion Dzhugashvili. The primary deduction made by Iremashvili based upon his account was followed by several psychobiographers, most notably by Gustav Bychowski and Daniel Rancour-Lafferiere, which consider beatings the key psychological determination of the future dictator. Iremashvili also reports that the young Stalin voluntarily terminated his studies at the Seminary, and was not expelled for his revolutionary activity as stated in the Soviet leader's official biography. In addition, he claims that Soso's parents were ethnic Ossetians, thus explaining Stalin's particularly hard-line policy towards independent Georgia and his excessive harshness in suppressing anti-Soviet opposition in the Georgian SSR in the 1920s.
