= Order of the National Hero (Georgia) =

Highest honor of Georgia

Order of National Hero
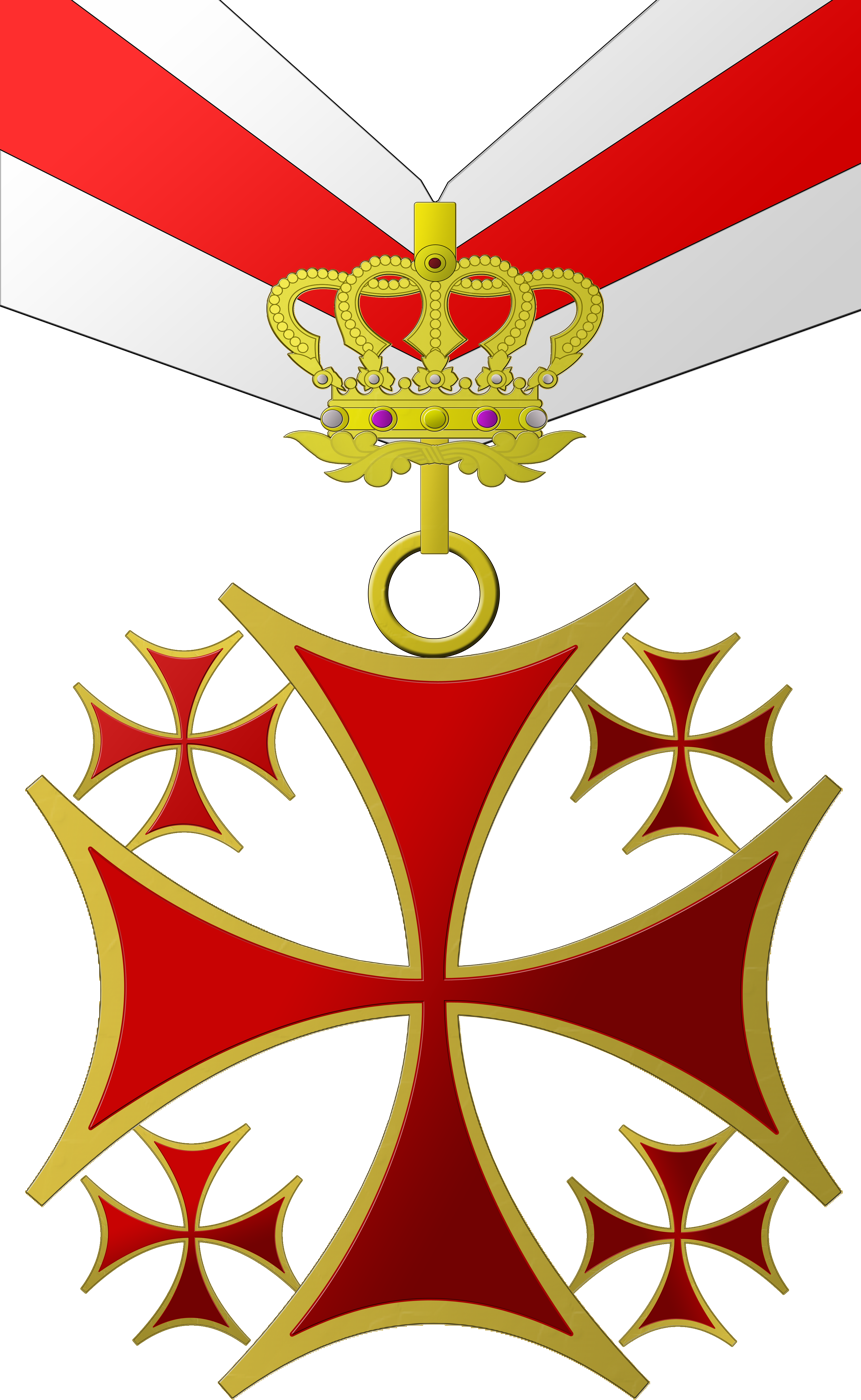
- Order of the National Hero

Awarded by Georgia
- Type: Single grade order
- Established: 24 June 2004
- Ribbon bar

The Order of the National Hero (Georgian: ეროვნული გმირის ორდენი, romanized: erovnuli gmiris ordeni) is the highest honor awarded by the government of Georgia together with the title of National Hero. It was established in 2004.

== Statute ==
The Order of National Hero was established on 24 June 2004. It is conferred on individuals for an "exceptional, distinguishable heroic" service to Georgia. The award carries the monetary grant of 10,000 Georgian lari.

== Recipients (partial list) ==
- Zhiuli Shartava – Georgian politician; posthumously, 2004.
- Zaza Damenia – Georgian army corporal; posthumously, 2004.
- John McCain – United States politician; 2010.
- Lech Kaczyński – President of Poland; posthumously, 2010.
- Zviad Gamsakhurdia – the first President of Georgia; posthumously, 2013.
- Merab Kostava – Georgian Soviet-era dissident; posthumously, 2013.
- Giorgi Mazniashvili – Georgian general; posthumously, 2013.
- Kakutsa Cholokashvili – Georgian military officer and a commander of an anti-Soviet guerrilla movement in Georgia; posthumously, 2013.
- Giorgi Kvinitadze – Georgian military commander; posthumously, 2013.
- Grigol Peradze – Georgian churchman and scholar; posthumously, 2013.
- Ekvtime Takaishvili – Georgian historian and archaeologist; posthumously, 2013.
- Ambrosi – Catholicos-Patriarch of Georgia; posthumously, 2013.
- Mikheil Tsereteli – Georgian historian; posthumously, 2013.
- Giorgi Antsukhelidze – Georgian army sergeant; posthumously, 2013.
- Zurab Iarajuli – Georgian Air Force officer; posthumously, 2013.
- Maro Makashvili – Georgian Red Cross nurse, the first woman to be awarded the Order; posthumously, 2015.
- Guram Gabiskiria – Mayor of Sukhumi during the separatist war in Abkhazia; posthumously, 2017.
- Zurab Chavchavadze – Soviet-era dissident; posthumously, 2018.
- Kote Abkhazi – Georgian military officer, politician and public figure; posthumously, 2023.
- Simon Bagration – Georgian military officer, member of the anti-Soviet national liberation movement; posthumously, 2023.
- Giorgi Khimshiashvili – Georgian military officer, member of the anti-Soviet national liberation movement; posthumously, 2023.
- Varden Tsulukidze – Georgian military commander, leader of the anti-Soviet national liberation movement; posthumously, 2023.
- Aleksandre Andronikashvili – Georgian military commander, leader of the anti-Soviet national liberation movement; posthumously, 2023.
- Jason Kereselidze – one of the leaders of the anti-Soviet national liberation movement, brother of Leo Kereselidze; posthumously, 2023.

== See also ==
- Orders, decorations, and medals of Georgia
- Order of Queen Tamara (2009)
