= Solomon Mogilevsky =

Soviet intelligence officer (1885-1925)

Solomon Mogilevsky Соломо́н Могиле́вский

Head of the Foreign Department of the Cheka/GPU
- In office August 5, 1921 – May 13, 1922
- Preceded by: Yakov Davydov
- Succeeded by: Ruben Katanyan
- Succeeded by: Mikhail Trilisser

Personal details
- Born: 1885 Pavlohrad, Russian Empire
- Died: March 22, 1925 (aged 39–40) near Tiflis, Georgian SSR, Soviet Union
- Party: Russian Communist Party (1918–1925)
- Other political affiliations: RSDLP (Bolsheviks) (1902–1918)

Military service
- Allegiance: Russian Empire (1916–1917); Russian Soviet Federative Socialist Republic (1917–1922); Soviet Union (1922–1925)
- Battles/wars: World War I Russian Civil War; August Uprising

Solomon Grigorevich Mogilevsky (Russian: Соломо́н Григо́рьевич Могиле́вский; 1885 – March 22, 1925) headed the Soviet foreign intelligence service, the INO of the GPU, from 1921 until May 1922. He was then sent to head the GPU in the South Caucasus region, where he was involved in the suppression of the 1924 August Uprising in the Georgian SSR. He died in a plane crash near Tiflis (Tbilisi) in unclear circumstances.

== Biography ==
Mogilevsky was born to Jewish parents in Pavlograd. In 1903 he joined the RSDRP and was arrested in 1904. In 1906 he left Russia for Switzerland where he met Vladimir Lenin, who recommended him to be admitted into Bolshevik section of the party. At the outbreak of World War I he returned to Russia and was a soldier on the front. Mogilevsky participated in the 1917 October Revolution. During the Russian Civil War he was appointed to various positions in the GPU. Since May 1922 Mogilevsky headed the Caucausian GPU and was responsible for intelligence in Iran and Turkey. He participated in the quelling of the August Uprising in the Georgian SSR. Mogilevsky was decorated with the Order of the Red Banner in 1924 for his outstanding activities in the suppression of the uprising.

== Death ==
Mogilevsky died in a plane crash in 1925 headed to a conference in Sukhumi. The plane, which also carried two other high-ranking Soviet security officials (Georgi Atarbekov and Aleksandr Myasnikyan), blew up in mid-air not far from Tiflis. The cause of the crash was never determined, despite the fact that three separate commissions later investigated the incident.

There has always been a strong suspicion that the young Georgian airman Ambako Sagaradze, who was piloting the plane, crashed deliberately, killing himself and his passengers. Another version linked Joseph Stalin and Lavrentiy Beria with Mogilevsky's death. Some alleged Beria arranged the catastrophe on Stalin's behalf. Others suspected Beria had his own motives for doing so and wanted to get rid of Mogilevsky in order to secure a succession to his post.
