= Simon Bagration =

Georgian military man and posthumously National Hero of Georgia

Simon Bagration of Mukhrani
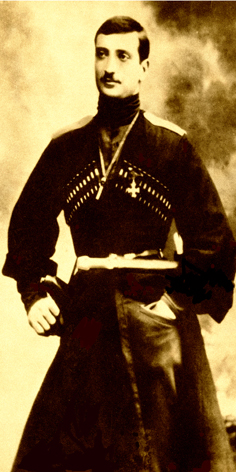
- Native name: სიმონ ბაგრატიონ-მუხრანელი
- Born: 1 September 1896 Tbilisi, Georgia, Russian Empire
- Died: 20 May 1923 (aged 26) Tbilisi, Georgian SSR
- Cause of death: Executed
- Allegiance: Russian Empire, Democratic Republic of Georgia, USSR
- Awards: Order of St. George, Order of St. Stanislav, Order of the National Hero (Georgia)

Simon "Simonika" Bagration of Mukhrani (b. 1 September 1896 – 20 May 1923) was a Georgian military officer and posthumous recipient of the Order of National Hero of Georgia. He served as captain of the national army of independent Georgia and member of the anti-Soviet national liberation movement from 1918 to 1921 and from 1921 to 1923, respectively.

== Biography ==
Simonika was born into a prominent aristocratic family. His father, Levan Bagration of Mukhrani (b. 1863 – 1901), the son of George Bagration and an older brother of Niko Bagration, was a representative of the Mukhrani branch of the formerly royal Bagrationi dynasty. Simonika's mother, Anastasia, was from the house of Tsereteli. Simonika himself married Nino Bagration-Davitashvili (b. 1897 – 1969). He graduated from Tbilisi Gymnasium and served in the army of the Russian Empire. He participated in World War I, fought on the western front in the ranks of the Tatar Cavalry Regiment, and was awarded the Order of St. George IV and III degrees (1914 and 1915) and the Order of St. Stanislav III degree (1917). He became an ensign in 1915 and returned to Georgia in 1917. Following Georgia’s declaration of independence in 1918, he served in the army of the Republic of Georgia as a captain of the Georgian Cavalry Regiment.

Simonika did not emigrate from Georgia after the Soviet invasion but instead continued his military service in the Red Army. He secretly sympathized with the National Democrats and, since 1922, was a member of the military organization of the National Democratic Party and the "Military Center" of the Independence Committee of Georgia. He participated in the organizing of public demonstrations against the Soviet regime and, in March 1923, was arrested in a hotel in Moscow. On May 20 of the same year, Simon was shot with other members of the "Military Center" in Tbilisi, in the territory of Vake Park. Simon Bagration's wife was soon exiled to Siberia.

On July 4, 2023, 100 years after his death, Simon Bagration of Mukhrani and other members of the military center were awarded the Order of National Hero and the title of the National Hero of Georgia by the decree of the President of Georgia, Salome Zourabichvili.
