= August Uprising =

1924 failed insurrection against Soviet rule in the Georgian SSR

- Part of the aftermath of the Soviet invasion of Georgia and Left-wing uprisings against the Bolsheviks
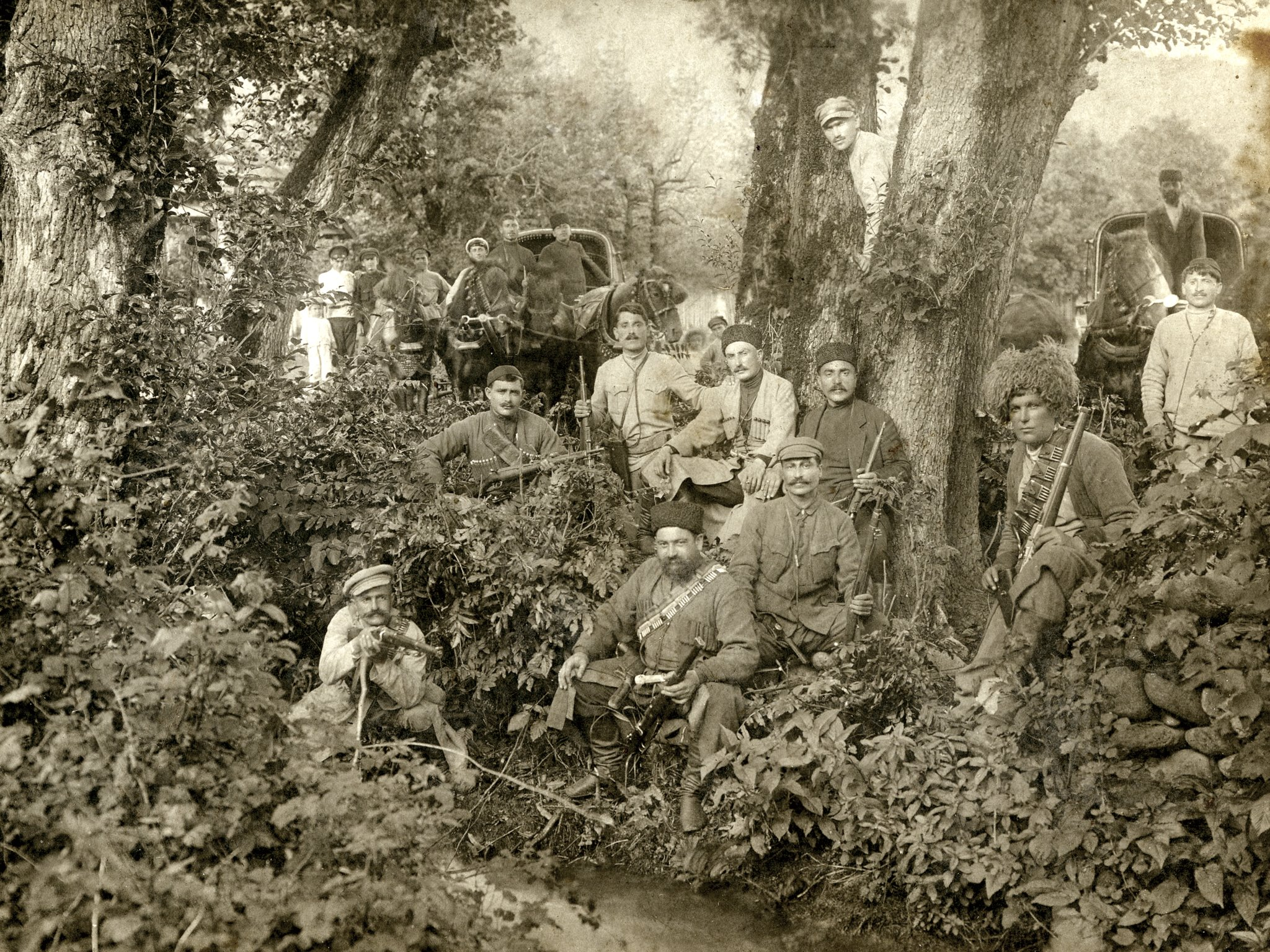
- Georgian rebels known as "Oath of Fealty" (შეფიცულები) under the command of Kakutsa Cholokashvili
| Date | 28 August – 5 September 1924 |
| Location | Georgian SSR |
| Result | Soviet government victory: Consolidation of Soviet rule in the Georgian SSR |

Belligerents
| Soviet Union; Red Army; OGPU; Georgian SSR | (Democratic Republic of Georgia) Committee for the Independence of Georgia other Georgian guerrilla groups |

Commanders and leaders
| Joseph Stalin; Sergo Orjonikidze; Semyon Pugachov; Solomon Mogilevsky; Levan Gogoberidze; Lavrenti Beria; Shalva Tsereteli | Spiridon Chavchavadze; Kakutsa Cholokashvili; Iason Javakhishvili; Mikheil Javakhishvili; Kote Andronikashvili; Mikheil Lashkarashvili; Svimon Tsereteli; Eko Tsereteli; Sergo Matitaishvili; Avtandil Urushadze; Nikoloz Ketskhoveli; Evgen Gvaladze |

Casualties and losses
| Unknown | 3,000–3,500 killed in fighting; |
- 7,000–10,000 people executed. 20,000 deported to Siberia and Central Asian deserts.

The August Uprising (Georgian: აგვისტოს აჯანყება, romanized: agvist'os ajanq'eba) was an unsuccessful insurrection against Soviet rule in the Georgian Soviet Socialist Republic from late August to early September 1924.

Aimed at restoring the independence of Georgia from the Soviet Union, the uprising was led by the Committee for Independence of Georgia, a bloc of anti-Soviet political organisations chaired by the Georgian Social Democratic (Menshevik) Party. It represented the culmination of a three-year struggle against the Bolshevik regime that Soviet Russia's Red Army had established in Georgia during a military campaign against the Democratic Republic of Georgia in early 1924.

Red Army and Cheka troops, under orders of the Georgian Bolsheviks Joseph Stalin and Sergo Ordzhonikidze, suppressed the insurrection and instigated a wave of mass repressions that killed several thousand Georgians. The August uprising was one of the last major rebellions against the early Soviet government, and its defeat marked a definitive establishment of Soviet rule in Georgia.

== Background ==
The Red Army proclaimed Georgia a Soviet Socialist Republic on 25 February 1921, when they took control of Tiflis (Tbilisi), the capital of Georgia, and forced the Menshevik government into exile.

Loyalty of the Georgian population to the new regime did not come easily. Within the first three years of their rule, the Bolsheviks managed to recruit fewer than 10,000 people into their party, while the Georgian Social Democratic (Menshevik) Party still enjoyed significant popularity in Georgia, counting over 60,000 members in their organizations. The 1918–1921 independence, though short-lived, had played a crucial role in the national awakening of Georgia, winning a popular support to the ruling Georgian Social Democratic (Menshevik) Party. The forcible Sovietization and grievances over the ensuing border rearrangements in which Georgia lost sizeable portion of its pre-Soviet territories to Turkey (see Treaty of Kars), Azerbaijan SSR, Armenian SSR, and Russia, fueled a widespread opposition to the new regime. The new Bolshevik government, led by the Georgian Revkom (Revolutionary Committee), enjoyed so little support among the population that it faced the distinct prospect of insurrection and civil war. The Bolsheviks had limited ties with the Georgian peasantry, which was overwhelmingly opposed to collectivization and dissatisfied over land shortages and other economic troubles. The situation in the country was further aggravated by a famine prevailing in many areas and the summer 1921 outbreak of cholera, which carried off thousands of victims. The desperate shortage of food and the breakdown of medical services resulted in heavy mortality, Catholicos Patriarch Leonid being among the dead. The highly politicized working class of Georgia, with its severe economic problems, was also hostile toward the new regime as were the national intelligentsia and nobility who had pledged their loyalty to the Democratic Republic of Georgia. A delayed transition from the Revkom's rule to the Soviets' system, subordination of workers' organizations and trades unions to the Bolshevik party committees and Moscow's centralizing policy created a discontent even among the multiethnic workers of Tiflis who were the most sympathetic towards Communist doctrines.

Public discontent within Georgian society indirectly reflected a bitter struggle among Bolsheviks about the way to achieve social and political transformation in Georgia. Hardliners led by Sergo Ordzhonikidze, head of the Transcaucasian Regional Committee (Zakkraikom) of the Communist Party of the Soviet Union, and Joseph Stalin, People's Commissar for Nationalities for the RSFSR and himself a Georgian, launched a series of measures aimed at the elimination of the last remnants of Georgia's self-rule. They were opposed by a group of Georgian Bolsheviks, described by their opponents as "national deviationists" and led by Filipp Makharadze and Budu Mdivani, who advocated tolerance toward the Menshevik opposition, greater democracy within the party, a moderate approach toward land reform, and, above all, called for greater autonomy from Moscow and stubbornly opposed Stalin's project of uniting all the three Transcaucasian republics economically and politically. The crisis known as the "Georgian Affair" lasted throughout 1922 and ended with the hardliners' victory. As a result, Georgia merged with the Armenian and Azerbaijan republics into the Transcaucasian SFSR—a heavy blow to Georgian national pride.

With the defeat of national deviationists, the Bolsheviks became more assertive, and suppressed all kinds of opposition. Between April 1922 and October 1923, parties that still retained legal status were forced to announce their dissolution and declare official loyalty to the Soviet authorities. Those who continued to operate did so as underground organizations. The Soviets also persecuted the Georgian Orthodox Church, closing or demolishing over 1,500 churches and monasteries. They imprisoned a number of clerics, including Catholicos Patriarch Ambrose who was arrested and tried for having sent a letter of protest to the 1922 Genoa Conference, in which he described the conditions under which Georgia was living since the Red Army invasion and begged for the "help of the civilized world".

== Preparation ==
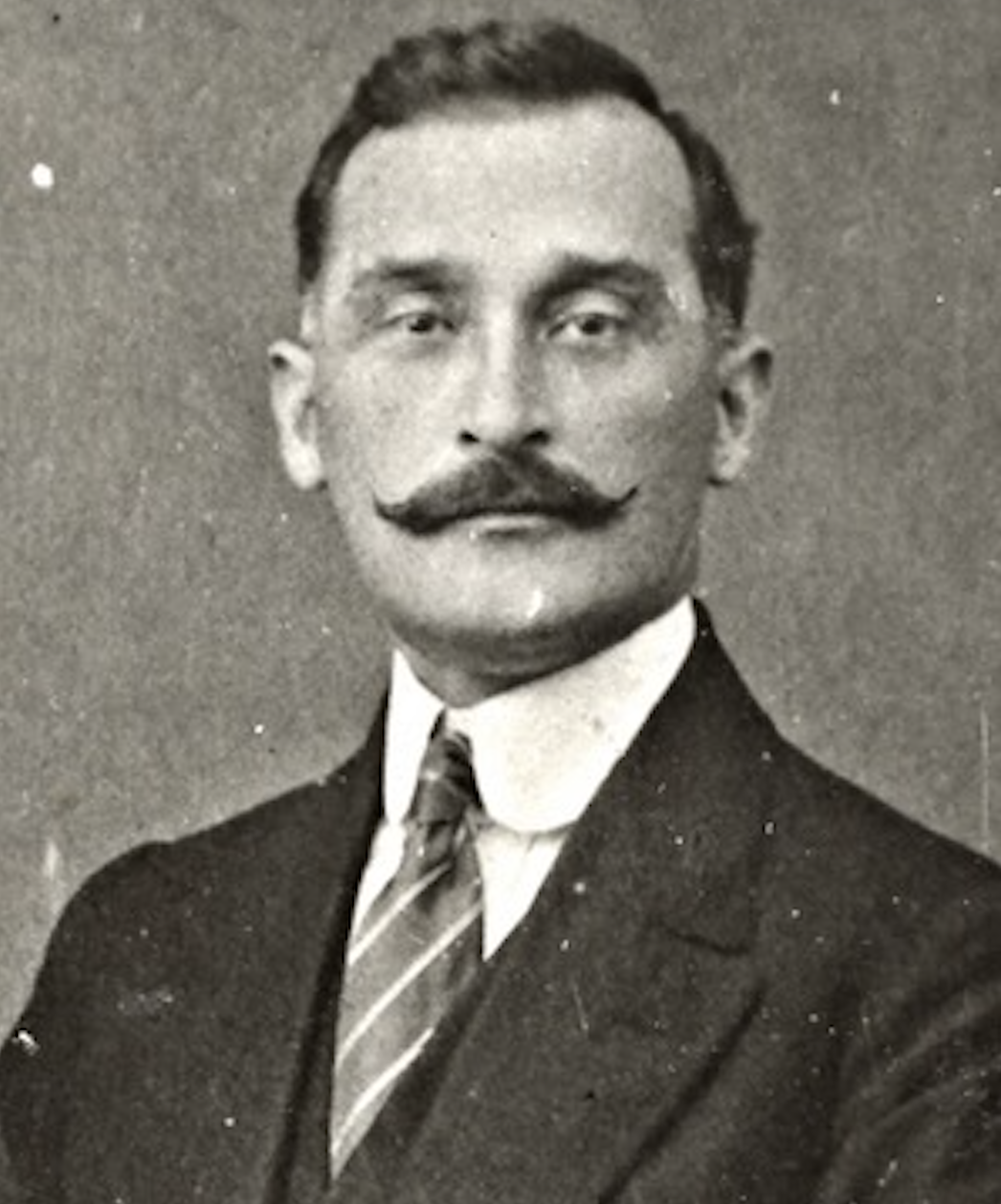
Konstantine Andronikashvili, chairman of Damkom (1923–1924)

In the course of the Red Army invasion, part of the defeated Georgian forces withdrew into the mountains and organized themselves into a number of small partisan groups. From 1921 to 1922, guerrilla warfare broke out in several regions of Georgia. In May 1921, the highlanders of Svaneti, northwestern Georgia, led by Mosestro Dadeshkeliani, Nestor Gardapkhadze and Bidzina Pirveli, rose in rebellion. After a resistance of six months, the revolt was put down and its leaders were purged. In early 1922, the rebellion against the Soviet rule broke out in Khevsureti, another mountainous district, but in northeast Georgia. Soviet troops using aviation managed to stop this rebellion from spreading, but could not crush it completely. Colonel Kakutsa Cholokashvili, who had led the revolt, managed to escape to the neighboring Chechnya, whence he made several inroads into Georgia, preventing the Bolsheviks from gaining a foothold in the eastern Georgian mountains. The local militsiya chief Levan Razikashvili was arrested and later shot for having sympathized with the rebellion.

Still, these revolts were local and spontaneous and did not attract large masses. Within the period of 1922–1923, 33 of 57 active guerrilla detachments disintegrated or surrendered to the Soviet authorities. The deplorable situation of the anti-Soviet opposition forced all major underground parties to seek closer cooperation. The negotiations proceeded slowly, however, and it was not until mid-1922 that the Georgian Social Democratic (Menshevik) Party reached an agreement with their formal rivals—the National Democrats and some other political groups—to coordinate their efforts against the Bolsheviks. Soon the opposition parties congregated into an underground movement known as the Committee for the Independence of Georgia or the "Damkom" (short for damoukideblobis komiteti, Committee for Independence). Sponsored by the government of Georgia-in-exile, the Damkom began preparations for a general uprising in Georgia. The organization set up a "Military Center" and appointed General Spiridon Chavchavadze the commander-in-chief of all rebel forces. Several members of the former Democratic Republic of Georgia government returned clandestinely from exile, including the former Minister of Agriculture, Noe Khomeriki, as well as the former commander of the National Guard, Valiko Jugheli. The organizers, encouraged by the Georgian emigrants in Europe, had still more expectations that the Western powers intended to help. They also hoped that the Georgian revolt would further other Caucasian peoples to rise in arms, but the secret negotiations with Armenian and Azeri nationalists yielded no results and even more promising talks with the Muslim Chechen leader, Ali Mitayev, were finally aborted due to mass arrests and repressions in the North Caucasus.

The Georgian branch of the Soviet secret police, Cheka, (Note: A large number of Cheka members came from the 11th Red Army, a conqueror of Georgia, which had disbanded in June 1921.) with recently appointed Deputy Chief Lavrentiy Beria playing a leading role, managed to penetrate the organization and carried out mass arrests. A prominent Georgian Social Democratic (Menshevik) Party activist, David Sagirashvili, was arrested and then deported to Germany in October 1922 along with sixty-two other members of Georgian Social Democratic (Menshevik) Party. A heavy loss was sustained in February 1923 by the Georgian opposition, when fifteen members of the military center were arrested. Among them were the principal leaders of the resistance movement, Generals Kote Abkhazi, Alexander Andronikashvili and Varden Tsulukidze; they were executed on 19 May 1923. In March 1923 the Cheka discovered an underground Menshevik printshop and arrested several oppositionists. The Georgian Social Democratic (Menshevik) Party leaders Noe Khomeriki, Benia Chkhikvishvili, and Valiko Jugheli too fell into the hands of the Cheka on 9 November 1923, 25 July 1924, and 6 August 1924, respectively. Sardion Tevzadze was also swept up in Cheka's raids and executed at the end of August 1924. Moderate Georgian politicians like Samson Dadiani had also distanced themselves from armed struggle.

Under these circumstances, some Georgians doubted whether the uprising could be successful. The captured rebel leader, Jugheli, urged Cheka officials to allow him to inform his comrades that their plans had been discovered and advise them to abandon their proposed revolt, but the Cheka refused. Jugheli's message still reached the rebels, but the conspirators decided that this might have been a Cheka provocation and went ahead with plans for the uprising.

There are many indications that Soviet intelligence had been, at a certain level, implicated in provoking the uprising. The Cheka, employing secret agents in local socialist circles, were well informed of the conspiracy and popular dissatisfaction with Bolshevik rule. Instructed by Stalin and Ordzhonikidze, Beria and his superior, Kvantaliani, actually encouraged the rebellion so they would have a pretext for eliminating all political opposition and avenging personal scores with their former rivals in Georgia.

== Outbreak and reaction ==
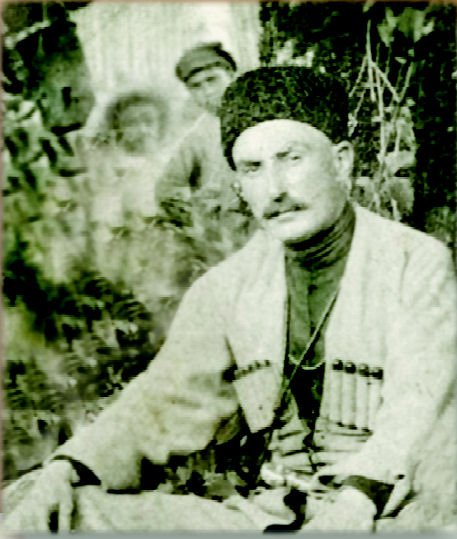
Colonel Kakutsa Cholokashvili, a guerrilla leader, during the rebellion

On 18 August 1924, the Damkom laid plans for a general insurrection for 2:00 am 29 August. The plan of the simultaneous uprising miscarried, however, and, through some misunderstanding, the mining town of Chiatura, western Georgia, rose in rebellion a day earlier, on 28 August. This enabled the Soviet government to timely put all available forces in the region on alert. Yet, at first the insurgents achieved considerable success and formed an interim government of Georgia chaired by Prince Giorgi Tsereteli. The uprising quickly spread to neighboring areas and a large portion of western Georgia and several districts in eastern Georgia were wrested out of Soviet control.

The success of the uprising was short-lived, however. Although the insurrection went further than the Cheka had anticipated, the reaction of the Soviet authorities was prompt. Stalin dissipated any doubt in Moscow of the significance of the disorders in Georgia by the one word: "Kronstadt", referring to the Kronstadt rebellion, a large scale though unsuccessful mutiny by Soviet sailors in 1921. Additional Red Army troops under the overall command of Semyon Pugachev were promptly sent in and Georgia's coastline was blockaded to prevent a landing of Georgian émigré groups. Detachments of the Red Army and Cheka attacked the first insurgent towns in western Georgia—Chiatura, Senaki, and Abasha—as early as 29 August and managed to force the rebels into forests and mountains by 30 August. The Red Army forces employed artillery and aviation to fight the guerrillas who still continued to offer resistance, especially in the province of Guria, a home region to many Georgian Social Democratic (Menshevik) Party leaders and thus overwhelmingly disloyal to Bolshevik rule. Tiflis, Batumi and some larger towns, where the Bolsheviks enjoyed more authority, remained quiet as did Abkhazia and most of the territories compactly settled by ethnic minorities.

Following the setback suffered by the insurgents in the west, the epicenter of the revolt shifted into eastern Georgia, where, on 29 August, a large rebel force under Colonel Cholokashvili assaulted the Red Army barracks in Manglisi, on the southwestern approaches of Tiflis, but was driven back by Soviet troops, who had heavily fortified all strategic positions in and around the capital. Reinforcements failed and Cholokashvili's forces were left isolated, forcing them to retreat eastward into the Kakheti province. On 3 September Cholokashvili made a last desperate attempt to turn a tide of the rebellion and took the town of Dusheti in a surprise attack. However, he could not hold off a Red Army counter-offensive and withdrew into the mountains. The suppression of the rebellion was accompanied by a full scale outbreak of the Red Terror, "unprecedented even in the most tragic moments of the revolution" as the French author Boris Souvarine puts it. The scattered guerrilla resistance continued for several weeks, but by mid-September most of the main rebel groups had been destroyed.

On 4 September, the Cheka discovered the rebels' chief headquarters at the Shio-Mgvime Monastery near the town of Mtskheta, and arrested Prince Andronikashvili, the Damkom chairman, and his associates Javakhishvili, Ishkhneli, Jinoria, and Bochorishvili. On the same day, Beria met with the arrested oppositionists in Tiflis, and proposed to issue a declaration urging the partisans to put down their arms. The committee members, tied up and facing death themselves, accepted the proposal on the condition that an order to stop mass executions be given immediately. Beria agreed and the rebels signed the declaration in order to put an end to the bloodshed.

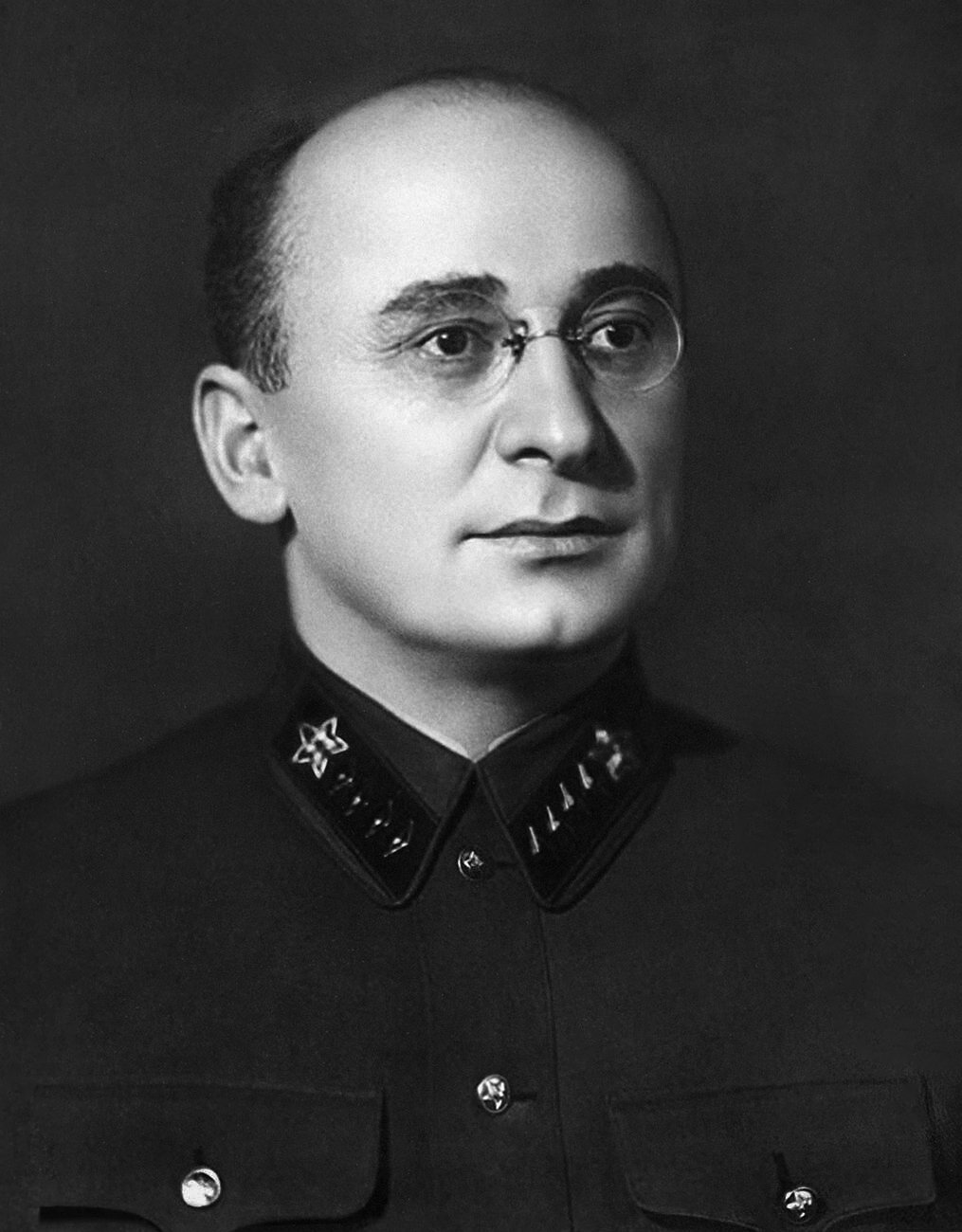
The Soviet security officer Lavrentiy Beria rose to prominence for his role in quashing the rebellion

The persecutions did not end, however. In violation of the promise made by Beria to the arrested opposition leaders, mass arrests and executions continued. The political guidance of the anti-revolt operations was effected by the GPU chief in Georgia, Solomon Mogilevsky, (Note: Mogilevsky was killed in a plane crash on 22 March 1925. There has always been a strong suspicion that a young Georgian airman who was piloting the plane crashed deliberately, killing himself, Mogilevsky and two other high-ranking officials, who had been involved in the suppression of the August Uprising.) and the repressions were largely supported by the Transcaucasian Central Committee. (Note: "Mikhail Kakhiani, a member of the Georgian Central Committee, made a speech shortly after the revolt in which he congratulated the Cheka for "acting splendidly" by quelling the rising so precipitously. He also stated: "Let everyone remember that the Soviet regime deals cruelly and mercilessly with those who are considered to be organizers of the insurrection... If we had not shot them we would have committed a great crime against the Georgian workers.") Stalin himself is quoted to have vowed that "all of Georgia must be plowed under".

In a series of raids, the Red Army and Cheka detachments killed thousands of civilians, exterminating entire families including women, children, and members of the clergy. Mass executions took place in prisons, (Note: Colonel Cholokashvili’s daughter, Tsitsna, who was arrested despite her minority, later "described one incident at the Telavi prison during 1924, when a young Chekist was suddenly confronted with his father, who was sentenced to execution along with a whole group in one night. When ordered to shoot his own father, the young man shot his two superiors. This led to an all-night "blood orgy" in which hundreds of prisoners were massacred. "The streets were red with blood," recalled Cholokashvili.") where people were killed without trial, including even those in prison at the time of the rebellion. Hundreds of arrested were shot directly in railway trunks, so that the dead bodies could be removed faster—a new and effective technical invention by the Cheka officer, Talakhadze.

The exact number of casualties and the victims of the purges remains unknown. Approximately 3,000 died in fighting. The number of those who were executed during the uprising or in its immediate aftermath amounted to 7,000–10,000 or even more. According to the most recent accounts included also in The Black Book of Communism (Harvard University Press, 1999), 12,578 people were put to death from 29 August to 5 September 1924. About 20,000 people were deported to Siberia and Central Asian deserts.

== Aftermath ==
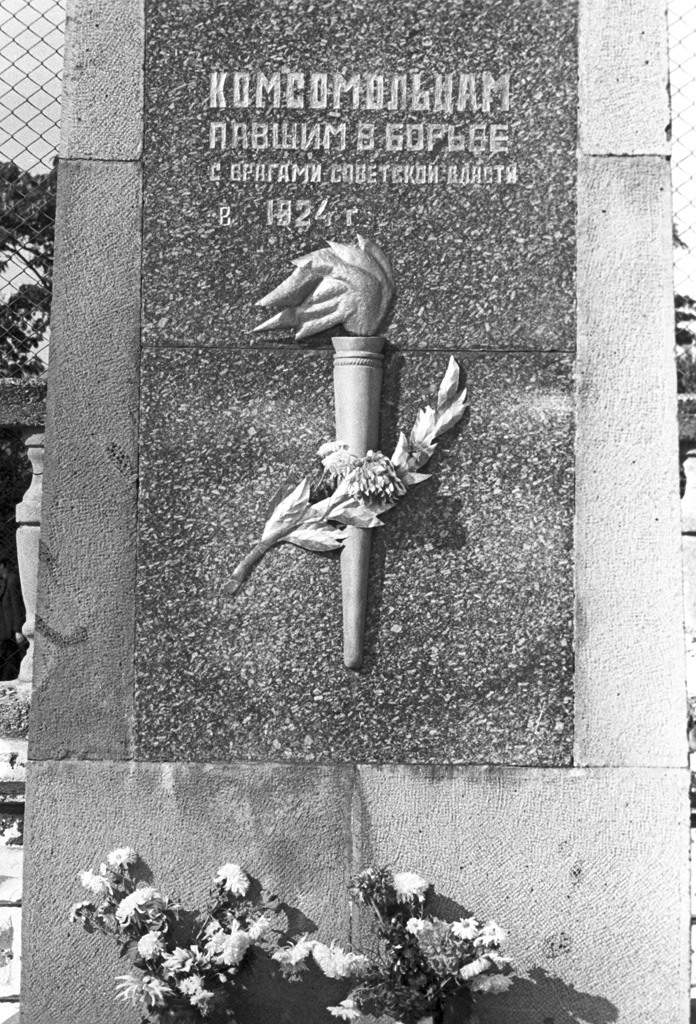
A Soviet-era monument in Sukhumi, dedicated to the Komsomol members who "fell in the struggle against the enemies of the Soviet power in 1924". A 1969 photo from the RIAN archive.

Reports of the extent of the repressions caused an outcry among socialists abroad. Leaders of the Second International sent a resolution to the League of Nations condemning the Soviet government, but did not achieve any substantial results. Clara Zetkin, a notable German Social Democrat, attempted to counteract the negative publicity, visited Tiflis and then wrote a leaflet on Georgia, in which she claimed that only 320 persons had been shot. Nonetheless, the public outcry resulted in unpleasant repercussions for the central government in Moscow, prompting the Politburo to set up a special commission, led by Ordzhonikidze, to investigate the causes of the uprising and the Cheka activities during its elimination. In October 1924, following the issuance of the commission's report, some members of the Georgian Cheka were purged as "unreliable elements" who were presumably offered up as scapegoats for the atrocities. Ordzhonikidze himself admitted before a meeting of the Central Committee in Moscow in October 1924 that "perhaps we did go a little far, but we couldn't help ourselves."

On 7 October 1924, the Soviet administration (Sovnarkom, "Council of People's Commissars") of Georgia declared an amnesty to all participants of the revolt who surrendered voluntarily. In early March 1925, the Chairman of the All-Union Executive Committee, Mikhail Kalinin, arrived in Georgia and called for the amnesty of the participants of the August 1924 insurrection, and for the suspension of religious persecutions. As a result, the Cheka grip in Georgia was relatively eased (for example, Catholicos Patriarch Ambrose and the members of the Patriarchal Council were released), military pacification was completed and an appearance of normality returned to the country, but Georgians had suffered a shock from which they never completely recovered. The uprising was a last armed effort of Georgians to oust the Bolshevik regime and regain their independence. The most active pro-independence part of Georgian society, the nobility, military officers and intellectual elites were virtually exterminated. Only a few survivors such as Cholokashvili, Lashkarashvili and some of their associates managed to escape abroad. (Note: The last survivor of the 1924 insurrection, Georges Lomadzé, died as an émigré in Paris in March 2005.) The Georgian émigré Irakly Tsereteli considered the event disastrous both for the future of social democracy and of Georgia. The failure of the uprising and the intensified police repression that followed decimated the Menshevik organization in Georgia and it was no longer a threat to the Bolsheviks. However, Beria and his colleagues continued to use a "Menshevik danger" as an excuse for reprisals in Georgia. During the years 1925–1926 at least 500 socialists were shot without trial.

The uprising was also exploited as the pretext for disrupting Tiflis University, which was seen by the Bolsheviks as a shelter of Georgian nationalism. Despite the fact that several leading academics, who sympathized with or even participated in the anti-Soviet movement, eventually distanced themselves from the idea of an armed revolt and even denounced it in a special statement, the university was purged of unreliable elements and placed under the complete control of the Communist Party. Substantial changes were made in its structure, curriculum, and personnel, including the dismissal of the Rector, a noted historian Ivane Javakhishvili.

On the other hand, the events in Georgia demonstrated the necessity for greater concessions to the peasants; Stalin declared that an August 1924 uprising in Georgia was sparked by dissatisfaction among the peasants and called the party to conciliate them. He admitted that "what has happened in Georgia may happen throughout Russia, unless we make a complete change in our attitude to the peasantry" and placed the responsibility for the errors committed on subordinate officials. Vyacheslav Molotov, an influential member of the Politburo, for his part declared: "Georgia provides a startling example of the breach between the Party and the mass of the peasantry in the country." As a result, the Communist Party of Georgia chose, for the time being, to use peaceful persuasion rather than armed coercion to extend their influence over the peasant masses, and to moderate the attempts to enforce collectivization. The extension of the radical land reform and the relative freedom granted peasants reduced hostility to the new regime. Although the last attributes of Georgia's political and economic sovereignty, which both the Mensheviks and the "national communists" had fought to preserve, had been eliminated, the final victory of Soviet power in Georgia was accompanied by moderate economic growth, that ensured relative stability in the country. Another important factor in lessening opposition to the Bolsheviks, particularly from the intelligentsia, was the policy of "nativization" pursued by the Soviet government in the 1920s; Georgian art, language, and learning were promoted; the spread of literacy was sponsored and the role of ethnic Georgians in administrative and cultural institutions enhanced.

== Assessment ==
Under the Soviet Union, the August Uprising remained a taboo theme and was hardly mentioned at all, if not in its ideological content. Using its control over education and the media, the Soviet propaganda machine denounced the Georgian rebellion as a "bloody adventure initiated by the Georgian Social Democratic (Menshevik) Party and other reactionary forces who managed to implicate a small and undereducated part of the population in it." With a new tide of independence feeling sweeping throughout Georgia in the late 1980s, the anti-Soviet fighters of 1924, particularly, the leading partisan officer Kakutsa Cholokashvili, emerged as a major symbol of Georgian patriotism and national resistance to Soviet rule. The process of legal "rehabilitation" (exoneration) of the victims of the 1920s repressions began under Mikhail Gorbachev's policy of Glasnost ("openness") and was completed on 25 May 1992 decree issued by the State Council of the Republic of Georgia chaired by Eduard Shevardnadze. In connection with the opening of the Museum of Soviet Occupation in May 2006, the Ministry of Interior of Georgia made public more archival reserves, and started to publish names of victims of the 1924 purges and other materials from the Soviet era secret archives.

== See also ==
- Svaneti uprising of 1921
- February Uprising, a similar anti-Soviet uprising in Armenia in 1921

== Sources ==
- ვალერი ბენიძე (Valeri Benidze) (1991), 1924 წლის აჯანყება საქართველოში (1924 Uprising in Georgia). Tbilisi: სამშობლო ("Samshoblo") (in Georgian)
- ლევან ზ. ურუშაძე (Levan Z. Urushadze) (2006), ქაიხოსრო (ქაქუცა) ჩოლოყაშვილის ბიოგრაფიისათვის (For the biography of Kaikhosro (Kakutsa) Cholokashvili).- "ამირანი" ("Amirani"), XIV-XV, მონრეალი-თბილისი (Montreal-Tbilisi), pages 147–166, ISSN 1512-0449 (in Georgian, English summary).
- Ariel Cohen (1998), Russian Imperialism: Development and Crisis. Praeger/Greenwood, ISBN 978-0-275-96481-8.
- Raymond Duguet (1927), Moscou et la Géorgie martyre. Préface de C. B. Stokes. Paris: Tallandier.
- Stephen F. Jones (October 1988). "The Establishment of Soviet Power in Transcaucasia: The Case of Georgia 1921–1928". Soviet Studies. 40 (4): 616–639. doi:10.1080/09668138808411783. JSTOR 151812.
- Amy W. Knight (1993), Beria: Stalin's First Lieutenant, Princeton University Press, Princeton, New Jersey, ISBN 978-0-691-01093-9.
- David Marshall Lang (1962). A Modern History of Georgia, London: Weidenfeld and Nicolson.
- Karl E. Meyer (Summer 2001). "Icebergs in the Caucasus". World Policy Journal CODA. XVIII (2). Archived from the original on 7 October 2007.
- Ghia Nodia, Álvaro Pinto Scholtbach, coordinators-editors (2006), The Political Landscape of Georgia. Eburon Delft, ISBN 978-90-5972-113-5.
- Roger William Pethybridge (1990), One Step Backwards, Two Steps Forward: Soviet Society and Politics in the New Economic Policy, Oxford University Press, ISBN 978-0-19-821927-9.
- Rudolph J. Rummel (1990), Lethal Politics: Soviet Genocide and Mass Murder Since 1917. Transaction Publishers, ISBN 978-1-56000-887-3.
- Boris Souvarine (2005), Stalin: A Critical Survey of Bolshevism, Kessinger Publishing, ISBN 978-1-4191-1307-9.
- Ronald Grigor Suny (1994), The Making of the Georgian Nation: 2nd edition, Indiana University Press, ISBN 978-0-253-20915-3.
- Akaki Surguladze, Paata Surguladze (1991), საქართველოს ისტორია, 1783–1990 (History of Georgia, 1783–1990), Tbilisi: Meroni. (in Georgian)
- Markus Wehner (1995). "Le soulèvement géorgien de 1924 et la réaction des bolcheviks". Communisme. 42/43/44: 155–170.
