= Sardion Tevzadze =

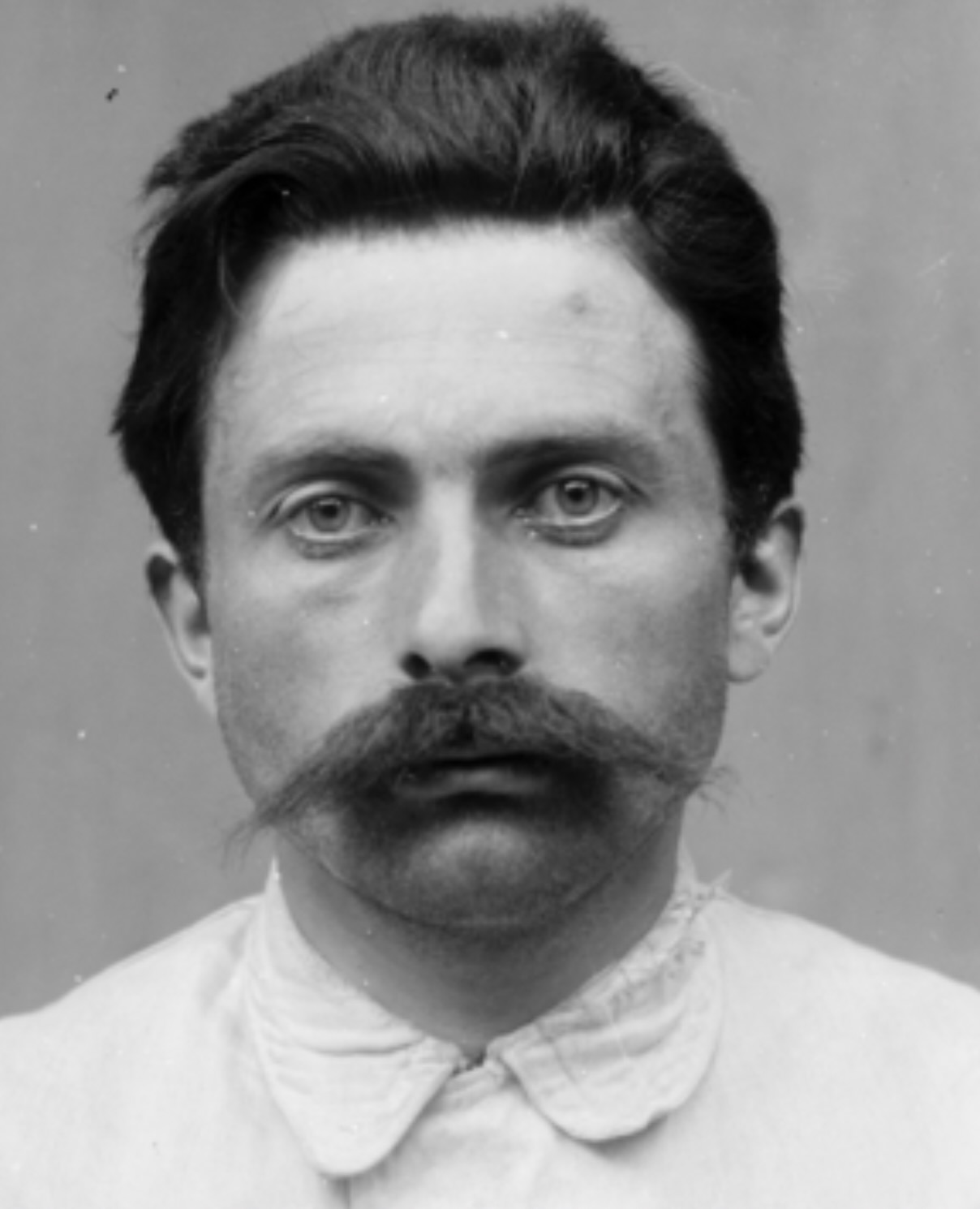
- Born: 1882; Samtredia Municipality, Kutaisi Governorate, Russian Empire
- Died: 30 August 1924 (aged 41–42); Tbilisi, Georgian Soviet Socialist Republic, Soviet Union
- Occupation: Politician
- Political party: Social Democratic Party of Georgia

Sardion Onisimes dze Tevzadze (Georgian: სარდიონ ონისიმეს ძე თევზაძე; 1882 – 30 August 1924) was a Georgian politician of the Social Democratic Party. He served as a member of the Georgian Parliament from 1919 to 1921.

Following the occupation of Georgia by Soviet Russia, Tevzadze joined the Georgian resistance movement against the invaders. His activities against the new Soviet authorities resulted in his arrest and execution in 1924.

== Biography ==
Tevzadze was born into a Georgian peasant family in the village of Tsiagobani, now part of Samtredia Municipality in western Georgia, then part of the Russian Empire. He became involved in agriculture in 1898. In 1904, he joined the Russian Social Democratic Labour Party and served on the Tbilisi district party committee between 1907 and 1908. During this period, he was arrested while working on the Tbilisi tram system; after four months in prison, he was expelled from the Tiflis Governorate. He was arrested again in 1911 and deported from the Caucasus region.

Following the February Revolution of 1917, Tevzadze returned to Tbilisi and became a member of the Tbilisi Council of Workers' and Soldiers' Deputies. In November 1917, he was elected to the National Council of Georgia. By 1918, he had become a member of the Constituent Assembly of Georgia representing the Social Democratic Party. In the Assembly, he served on the agrarian and central electoral commissions and as secretary of the economic commission.

After the Red Army invasion of Georgia in 1921, Tevzadze participated in the resistance movement before returning to his home village to work. On 10 June 1924, the Cheka issued a warrant for his arrest on charges of anti-revolutionary activities. Following the August Uprising, Tevzadze was executed by firing squad in Tbilisi on 30 August 1924, along with other political prisoners.

== See also ==
- Samson Dadiani
- Noe Khomeriki
- Leo Kereselidze
- Konstantine Andronikashvili
