= Aleksandre Andronikashvili =

Georgian military commander

Andronikashvili

Alexander Andronikashvili (Georgian: ალექსანდრე ანდრონიკაშვილი) also known as Andronikov (7 October 1871 – 19 May 1923) was a Georgian military commander and anti-Soviet resistance leader.

Of an old noble family, Andronikashvili served in the Imperial Russian army and was promoted to the rank of general in World War I. He then served for the General Staff of the military of the newly independent Democratic Republic of Georgia. After the republic's fall to the Soviets (1921) he became one of the leaders of an underground independence movement. Andronikashvili was arrested by the Cheka along with his associates and shot at the outskirts of Tbilisi on 19 May 1923. In 2023, he was posthumously awarded the title and Order of National Hero of Georgia.

== See also ==
- Konstantine Andronikashvili

== Sources ==
- Gogitidze, Mamuka; Bezhitashvili, Giorgi (2015). Faithfuls to the military oath. Tʻbilisi: Shota Rustaveli National University. ISBN 978-9941-0-7386-1.
