= Samson Dadiani =

Georgian politician and lawyer

- სამსონ დადიანი
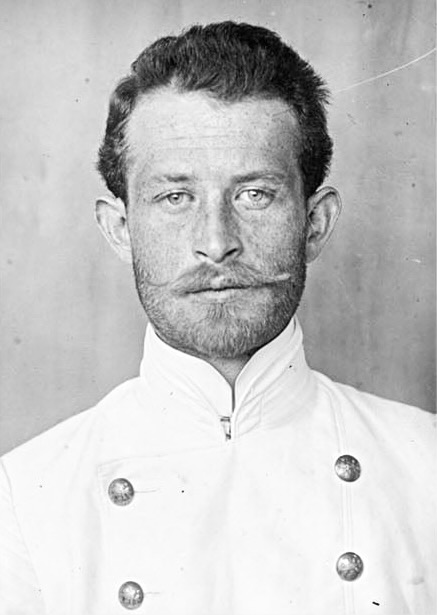
- Police mug shot of Dadiani, 1909
- Born: December 23, 1886; Modinakhe, Zugdidi Uyezd, Russian Empire
- Died: December 11, 1937 (aged 50); Tbilisi, Georgian SSR, Soviet Union
- Education: Saint Petersburg Imperial University
- Occupations: Politician, lawyer, playwright
- Political party: Georgian Socialist-Federalist Revolutionary Party
- Parent(s): Platon Dadiani (father), Salome Pagava (mother)

Samson Platonis dze Dadiani (Georgian: სამსონ პლატონის ძე დადიანი; December 23, 1886 – December 11, 1937) was a Georgian politician, lawyer, and publicist. A member of the Georgian Socialist-Federalist Revolutionary Party, he had a tense relationship with the Russian Imperial authorities. In 1917, he was elected to the National Council of Georgia, which presided over the declaration of independence from Russia. After the Democratic Republic of Georgia achieved its independence in 1918, Dadiani was elected to the new Georgian Parliament. He played a significant role in shaping the first Constitution of Georgia, which was considered one of the most progressive constitutions in the world.

Following the Red Army invasion of Georgia and the establishment of Soviet rule, Dadiani was persecuted by the new regime as well. Being a moderate politician, he was not in favor of armed rebellions, such as the August Uprising. However, he remained outspoken and his participation in the pro-independence committee made him an object of continued suspicion from the regime. He was also part of the defense team for Patriarch Ambrosius of Georgia during the highly publicized show trials. After years of friction with the Soviet authorities and multiple arrests, Dadiani was finally swept up in the Great Purge of 1937 and executed.

== Biography ==
Samson Dadiani was born to Georgian parents, Platon Dadiani and Salome Pagava, in the village of Modinakhe, located in the Zugdidi district of western Georgia. He graduated from the Georgian Gymnasium in Tbilisi before pursuing higher legal education at Saint Petersburg Imperial University, which he completed in 1908. During the 1905 Revolution, his father, Platon Dadiani, was killed by peasants after troops suppressing the rebellion were stationed on their estate.

From the 1910s, Dadiani became a frequent contributor to the Georgian press, writing on literature and art. He authored the drama At the Crossroads, dedicated to the 1905 Revolution, and the historical drama Giorgi Saakadze.

=== Political Career ===
In 1908, he joined the Socialist-Federalist Revolutionary Party of Georgia. The following year he was arrested by the Tsarist police in Tbilisi due to his political activities. In 1910 he was again arrested, along with several Ukrainian members of a student activist organization, and spent a week in detention. In the following years, under various pseudonyms he continued to publish subversive literature in Georgian publications that draw scrutiny from state censors and almost resulted in editors being arrested.

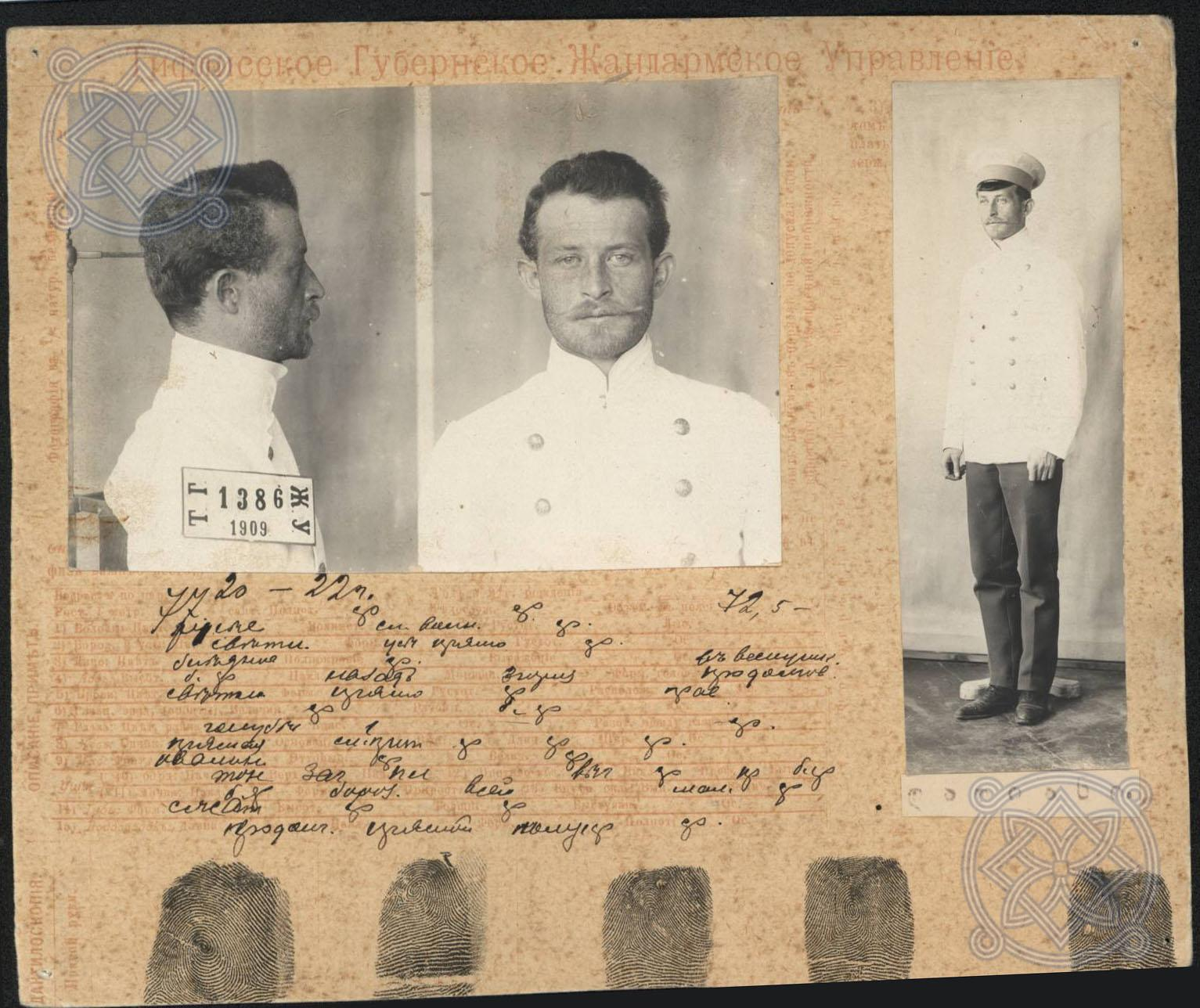
Reference card on Samson Dadiani maintained by the imperial gendarmerie in Tiflis, 1909

Following the Russian Revolution, he participated in the inter-party meetings of Georgian political groups in April 1917. In November 1917, at the first National Congress, he was elected as a member and secretary of the National Council of Georgia.

From June 1918, he served as a member of the National Council (parliament) of the independent Democratic Republic of Georgia within the Socialist-Federalist faction. In August 1919, he was elected to the Constituent Assembly of Georgia during supplementary elections. Dadiani played a significant role in drafting the first Constitution of Georgia, specifically authoring the fourteenth chapter concerning the "Rights of National Minorities." In January 1921, he was appointed as the deputy chairman of his party's central committee.

=== Soviet Period and execution ===
After the Red Army invasion of Georgia in 1921, Dadiani remained in Georgia as part of the "Right-wing Federalists," maintaining his stance on Georgian sovereignty. He worked as a legal advisor for banks and joined the College of Advocates of the Georgian SSR.

In 1921, he was briefly arrested after giving a speech to demonstrators gathered in front of Tiflis Military Cathedral. The event was meant to honor Georgian soldiers who had died defending Tbilisi from the Red Army just 40 days prior.

In February 1922, in order to suppress anti-Soviet demonstrations planned for the anniversary of the occupation of Georgia, the Cheka began preemptively arresting leaders and active members of opposition parties. Samson Dadiani was included in this list and was arrested in his house in Tbilisi. The Cheka Presidium sentenced him to 6 months of solitary confinement at the Metekhi “correctional house” No. 2, from which he was released on August 22, 1922.

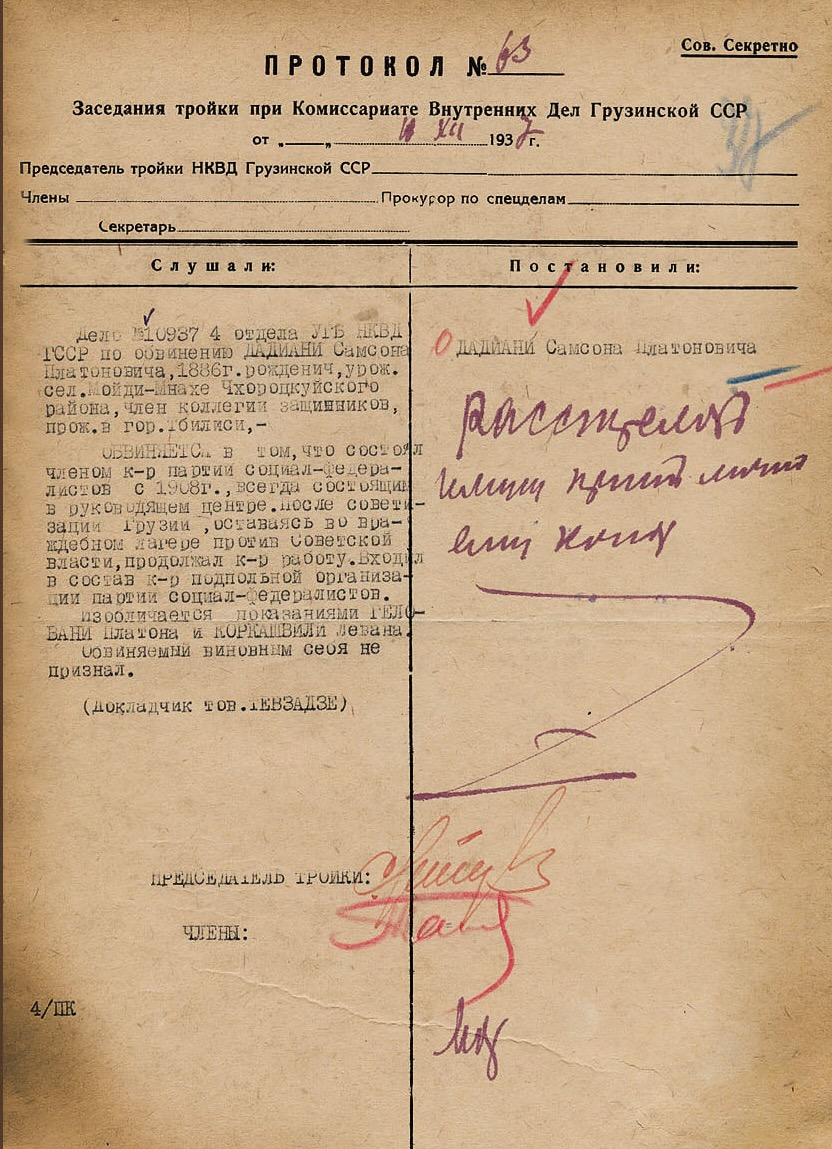
Decision of the NKVD troika condemning Samson Dadiani to execution due to "remaining a member of the enemy camp opposed to Soviet rule"

In 1924, he joined the Committee for the Independence of Georgia, representing the Socialist-Federalists, but later resigned as he opposed the plan for an armed uprising. This same year, he was involved in defending Ambrosius of Georgia, whom the authorities accused of anti-Soviet propaganda and concealing historic treasures of the church.

Despite his opposition to the uprising, he was arrested in 1924 in connection with the independence committee. He was sentenced to three years in prison but was initially released as the Soviet authorities deemed him "non-dangerous." However, during the Great Purge in 1937, he was arrested again. He was sentenced to death on December 10 and executed by firing squad the following night, December 11, 1937.

== See also ==
- Leo Kereselidze
- Sardion Tevzadze
- Konstantine Andronikashvili

== Bibliography ==
- Khvadagiani, Irakli (2016). The Constituent Assembly of Georgia 1919. Soviet Past Research Laboratory. pp. 173–174.
- Urushadze, L. (2012). Encyclopedia "Georgia", Vol. 2. p. 254.
- Shvelidze, D. (2018). Democratic Republic of Georgia (1918–1921): Encyclopedia-Dictionary. University Press. p. 107.
