= Simon Mchedlidze =

Georgian priest and martyr (1856–1924)

Saint Simon Mchedlidze
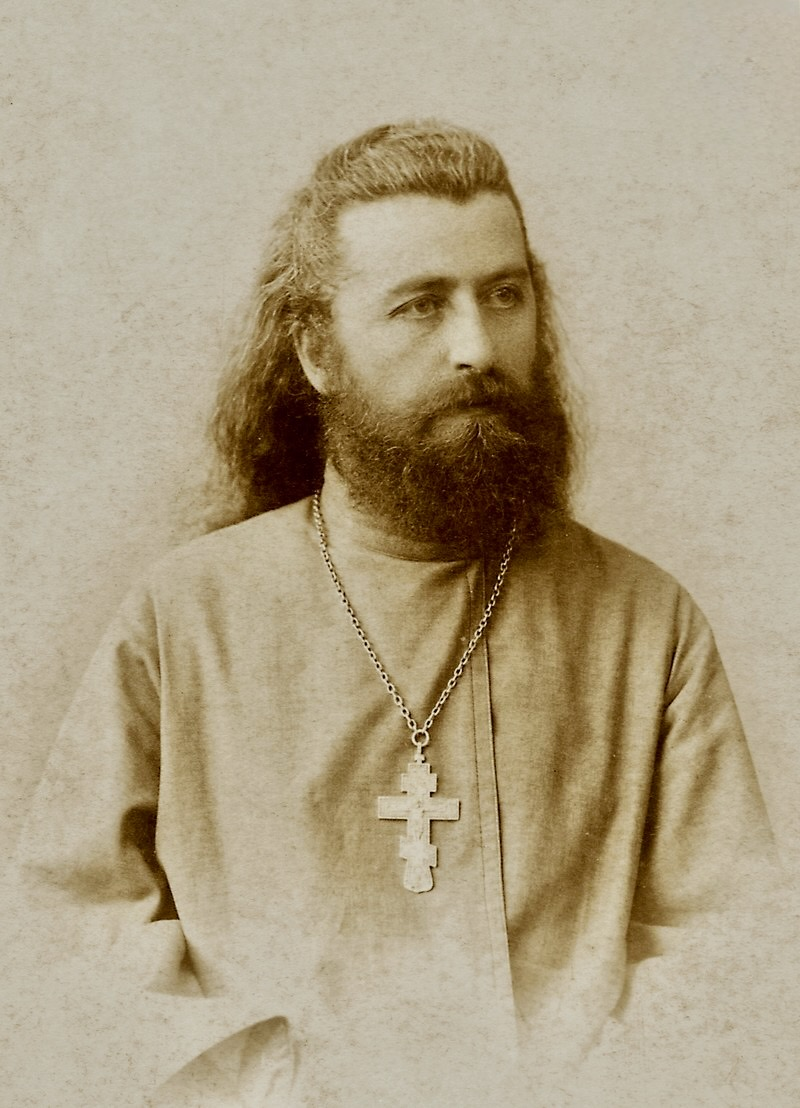
- Saint Simon Mchedlidze

Martyr
- Born: 1856; Sviri, Kutaisi Governorate, Russian Empire
- Died: September 1, 1924 (aged 68); Sapichkhia, Kutaisi, Georgian SSR
- Venerated in: Eastern Orthodox Church
- Canonized: 1995 by Georgian Orthodox Church
- Feast: 1 September

Simon Mchedlidze (Georgian: სიმონ მჭედლიძე; 1856 – 1 September 1924) was a Georgian clergyman, educator, and journalist. A prominent figure in the educational and ecclesiastical life of Western Georgia, Mchedlidze was executed by Soviet authorities during the repressions that followed the August Uprising of 1924. He was canonized as a martyr by the Georgian Orthodox Church in 1995.

== Biography ==
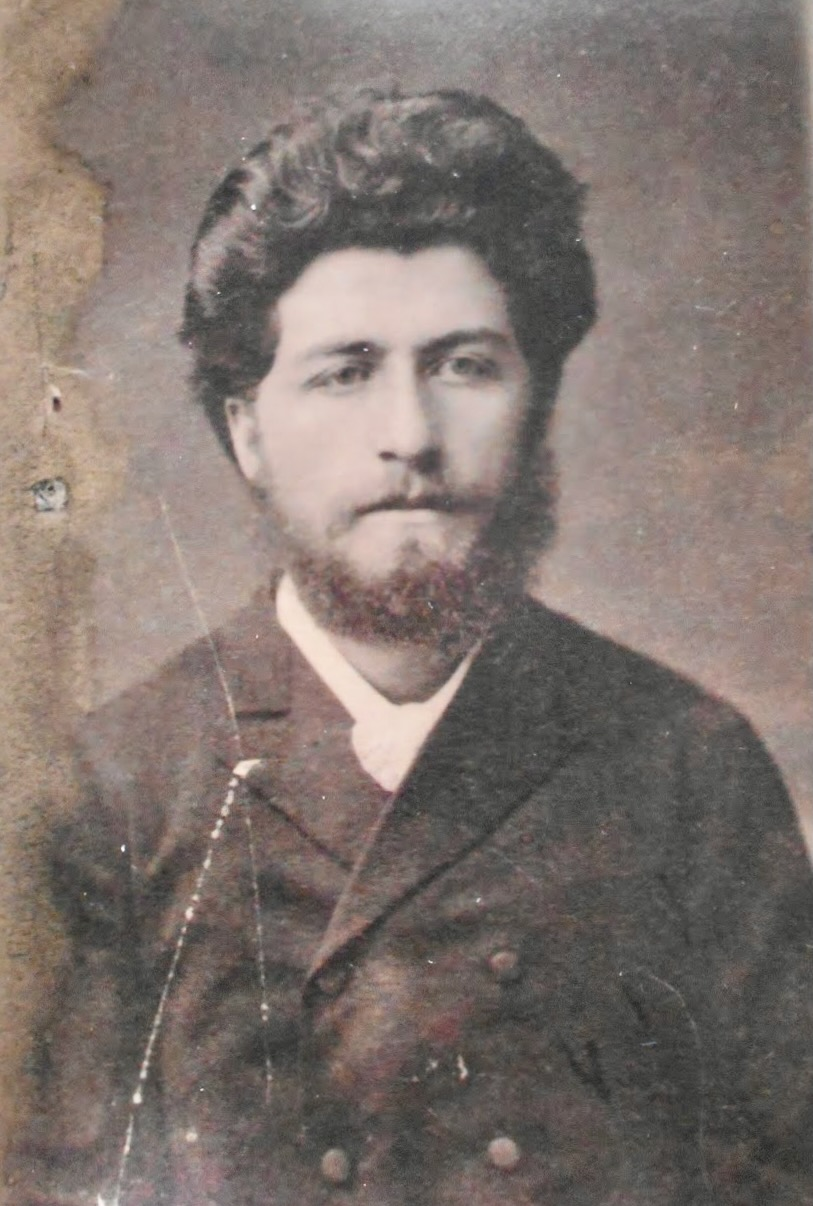
Simon as a young man before priesthood

He was born in 1856 in the village of Sviri, in the Imereti region of western Georgia, then part of the Russian Empire. He studied at the Tbilisi Theological Seminary and later graduated from the Stavropol Theological Academy.

He began his career in education at the Old Senaki School of Nobility. In 1891, he moved to Kutaisi, where he established a private pro-gymnasium. In 1894, he was ordained a priest.

By 1902, he had been appointed head priest of St. George's Church in his native Sviri. He was a prolific editor and publisher, founding several periodicals, including Shinauri Saqmeebi (Internal Affairs), a weekly newspaper published from 1908 to 1916, and Gantiadi (The Dawn), a theological and literary collection published from 1913 to 1915.

He established the "Imereti Religious-Educational Brotherhood" printing house. In 1918, he founded a secondary school in the village of Lashe, which continues to operate today.

Following the Soviet takeover of Georgia, Mchedlidze remained an active and vocal figure in the church. During the repressions following the August Uprising of 1924, he was arrested by the Cheka. On 1 September 1924, he was executed by firing squad in the Sapichkhia forest near Kutaisi, alongside Metropolitan Nazarie and other clergymen.

On 19 September 1995, the Holy Synod of the Georgian Orthodox Church canonized him as a Holy Martyr. His feast day is observed on 1 September.

== See also ==
- August Uprising
- Christianity in Georgia (country)
