= Committee for the Independence of Georgia =

Anti-Soviet organization active in the Georgian SSR in the early 1920s

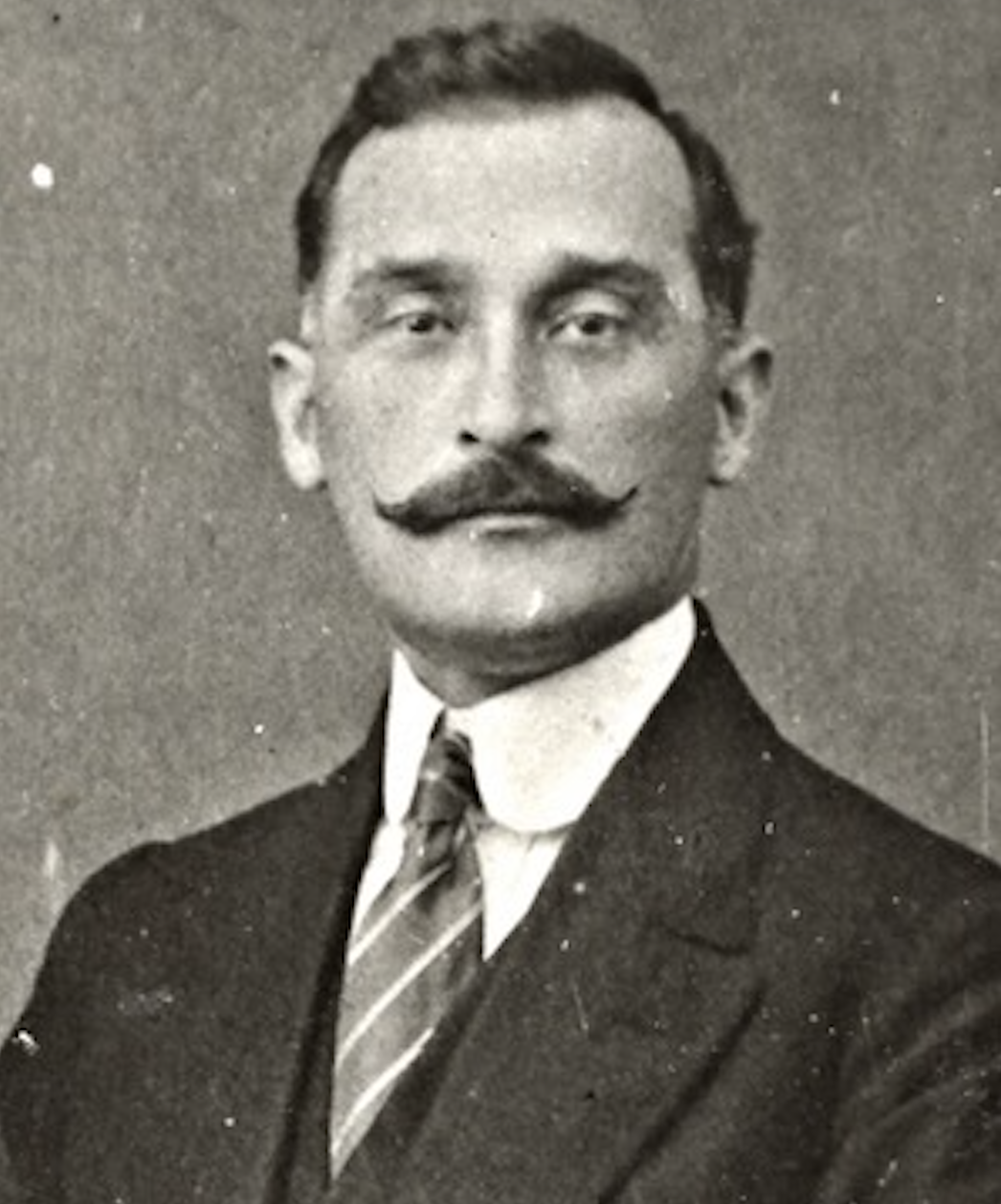
Konstantine Andronikashvili, chairman of the Committee for Independence of Georgia from 1923 to 1924

The Committee for the Independence of Georgia (Georgian: საქართველოს დამოუკიდებლობის კომიტეტი, romanized: sakartvelos damouk'ideblobis k'omit'et'i) or the Parity Committee (Georgian: პარიტეტული კომიტეტი, romanized: p'arit'et'uli k'omit'et'i, p'arit'et'uli k'omit'et'i) was an underground anti-Soviet organization active in the Georgian Soviet Socialist Republic in the early 1920s. It is commonly known as "Damkom" (short for damouk'ideblobis k'omit'et'i, the Committee for Independence). The committee was responsible for the preparation and guidance of the abortive August Uprising of 1924.

The committee was formed early in May 1922 as a result of the negotiations of the Georgian Social Democrats (Mensheviks), a former ruling party in pre-Communist Georgia, with its erstwhile political opposition – the National Democratic Party, the Federalist Party, the Socialist Revolutionaries (SRs) and the Skhivi ("Beam") Party. Each party was represented by one member in the Damkom (hence the organization's alternative name, the Parity Committee), which was traditionally chaired by a Menshevik. Gogita Paghava was the first chairman; he was shortly succeeded by Nikoloz Kartsivadze, who was arrested by the Soviet secret police, Cheka, on 16 March 1923, and was replaced with Kote Andronikashvili. Throughout its existence, the Secretary of the Damkom was Yason Javakhishvili of the National Democratic Party.

The accord signed by the members of the Damkom envisaged the overthrow of the Bolshevik regime through a nationwide uprising, restoration of the Democratic Republic of Georgia and the formation of a coalition government. The committee maintained close contacts with the Government of Georgia-in-exile though its "Constantinople Bureau" based in Istanbul, Turkey. The committee set up a military center chaired by the retired general Kote Abkhazi, who was to prepare for a popular insurrection. Several members of the former Menshevik government returned clandestinely from exile, including the former Minister of Agriculture, Noe Khomeriki, as well as the former commander of the People's Guard, Valiko Jugheli.

The Georgian Cheka, with recently appointed Deputy Chief Lavrentiy Beria playing a leading role, managed to penetrate the organization and carried out mass arrests. A heavy loss was sustained by the Georgian opposition in February 1923, when the military center was betrayed by Kote Misabishvili, a student member of the National-Democratic party. Fifteen members of the military center were arrested, among them the principal leaders of the resistance movement: Kote Abkhazi, Alexander Andronikashvili, Varden Tsulukidze, Colonel Giorgi Khimshiashvili, Simon Bagration-Mukhraneli, Elizbar Gulisashvili, and Rostom Muskhelishvili; they were executed on 20 May 1923. Khomeriki and Jugheli also fell in the hands of the Cheka and were subsequently shot. After some hesitation, the committee went ahead and laid plans for a general insurrection for 2.00 am 29 August 1924. The plan of the simultaneous uprising miscarried, however, and, through some misunderstanding, the mining town of Chiatura, western Georgia, rose in rebellion a day earlier, on 28 August.

The revolt continued for three weeks in several districts of Georgia and was crushed by the Red Army and Cheka forces. The suppression of the uprising was accompanied by large-scale repressions in which several thousands were killed. On 4 September the Cheka discovered the rebels' chief headquarters at the Shio-Mgvime Monastery near the town of Mtskheta, and arrested the leaders of the Damkom, including its chairman Andronikashvili. On the same day, Beria met them in Tiflis, and proposed to issue a declaration urging the partisans to put down their arms. The committee members, tied up and facing death themselves, accepted the proposal on the condition that an order to stop mass executions be given immediately. Beria agreed and the rebels signed the declaration in order to put an end to the bloodshed. The persecutions did not end, however, and the arrested opposition leaders themselves were shortly put to death. By mid-September, most of the Damkom's armed detachments had been destroyed and the uprising defeated.
