= Varden Tsulukidze =

Military Commander

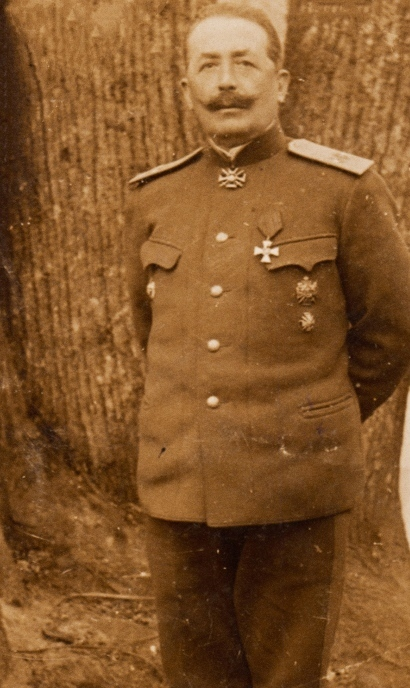
Prince Varden Tsulukidze

Varden Tsulukidze (Georgian: ვარდენ წულუკიძე; 8 November 1865 – 19 May 1923) was a Georgian military commander and anti-Soviet resistance leader.

== Biography ==
Born into the old House of Tsulukidze, Varden served in the Imperial Russian Army and was promoted to the rank of major general in World War I where he fought against the Ottoman Empire during the Caucasus campaign. He then commanded a brigade in the newly independent Democratic Republic of Georgia. After the country's fall to the Soviets in 1921, he became one of the leaders of an underground independence movement. On 19 May 1923, Tsulukidze was arrested by the Cheka along with his associates and executed at the outskirts of Tbilisi. In 2023, he was posthumously awarded the title and Order of National Hero of Georgia.

== Sources ==
- Gogitidze, Mamuka; Bezhitashvili, Giorgi (2015). Faithfuls to the military oath. Tʻbilisi: Shota Rustaveli National University. ISBN 978-9941-0-7386-1.
