= Social Democratic Party of Georgia =

Former political party in Georgia

Social Democratic Party of Georgia საქართველოს სოციალ-დემოკრატიული პარტია
- Founded: Late 1893
- Dissolved: c. 1954
- Split from: Mesame Dasi
- Headquarters: Tiflis, Georgia (until 1921)
- Newspaper: Ertoba
- Ideology: Democratic socialism Left-wing nationalism Marxism; Menshevism; Social democracy
- Political position: Left-wing
- National affiliation: Russian Social Democratic Labour Party (1898–1912); Russian Social Democratic Labour Party (Mensheviks) (1912–1918)
- International affiliation: Labour and Socialist International (1923–1940)
- Constituent Assembly of Georgia: 109 / 130

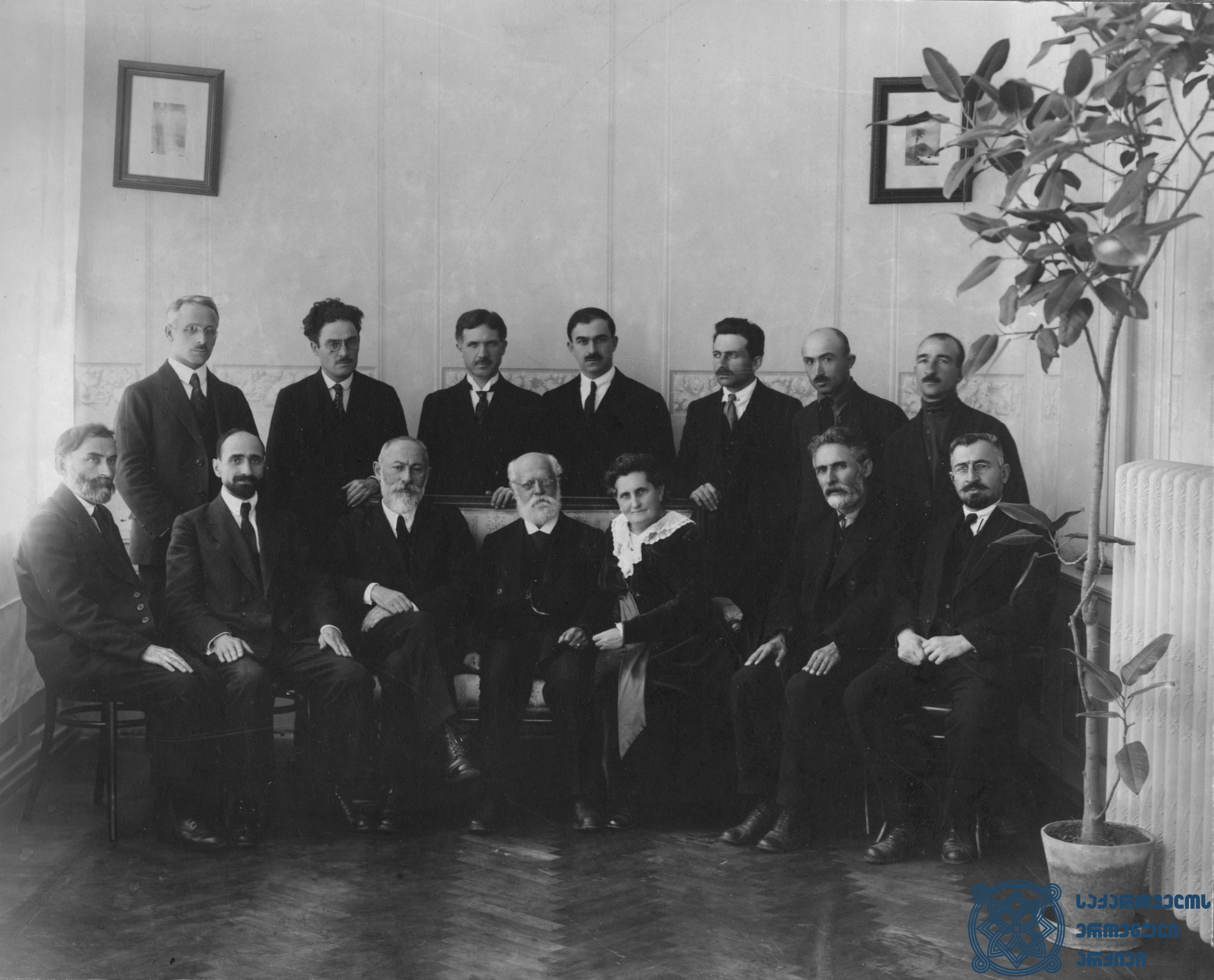
Karl Kautsky with the Georgian Social-Democrats, Tbilisi, 1920.

The Social Democratic Party of Georgia (Georgian: საქართველოს სოციალ-დემოკრატიული პარტია, romanized: sakartvelos sotsial-demok'rat'iuli p'art'ia), also known as the Georgian Menshevik Party, was a Georgian Marxist and social democratic political party. It was founded in the 1890s by Nikolay Chkheidze, Silibistro Jibladze, Egnate Ninoshvili, Noe Zhordania and others. It became the Georgian branch of the Russian Social Democratic Labour Party. After 1905, Georgian social democrats joined the Menshevik faction, except for some such as Joseph Stalin, Grigol Ordzhonikidze and Makharadze. Several leaders were elected to the Russian Duma from Kutais or Tifli: Nikolay Chkheidze, Akaki Chkhenkeli, Evgeni Gegechkori, Isidore Ramishvili, Irakli Tsereteli, and Noe Zhordania.

The party was prior to 1917 "ambivalent" on Georgia's independence from Russia, for which it has been criticized by some Georgians as "unpatriotic and anti-national". Natalie Sabanadze describes them as "unique in their non-nationalist approach to national liberation." She argues that "they led a highly successful national movement while maintaining a degree of hostility towards nationalism and avoiding the use of nationalist rhetoric and ideology." The party became a "vehicle for Georgian nationalism" following the Russian Revolution. It governed the Democratic Republic of Georgia from 1918 to 1921. At parliamentary elections on February 14, 1919 it garnered 81.5% of the votes. Noe Zhordania became prime minister. In the words of Ronald Grigor Suny, "Their achievement in building a Georgian political nation was extraordinary. Their support among all classes of the Georgian people was genuine. And however ephemeral their accomplishments in the brief episode of national independence, the most impressive testimony to their successes is the fact that they could not be dislodged from Georgia except by a militarily superior force from outside."

In March 1921, the Georgian government was overthrown by the Red Army invasion. The party was liquidated in Georgia during the Soviet repressions predating to the failed anti-Soviet August Uprising in 1924. From 1921 onwards, the party began operating in exile, particularly in France, Germany (until 1933) and the United States. A Foreign Bureau was set up as the new leading organ of the party. The party was a member of the Labour and Socialist International between 1923 and 1940. During World War II, the Government of the Democratic Republic of Georgia in Exile, along with the ruling Georgian Social Democratic Party, issued an official statement on February 4, 1940, declaring its support for the government of France and the entire anti-Hitler coalition.

== Notable members ==
- Konstantine Andronikashvili
- Nikolay Chkheidze
- Akaki Chkhenkeli
- Evgeni Gegechkori
- Ivane Gomarteli
- Ioseb Iremashvili
- Valiko Jugheli
- Noe Khomeriki
- Ioannis Passalidis
- Isidore Ramishvili
- Noe Ramishvili
- Irakli Tsereteli
- Noe Zhordania

== See also ==
- Government of the Democratic Republic of Georgia in Exile
