= Konstantine Andronikashvili =

Georgian politician

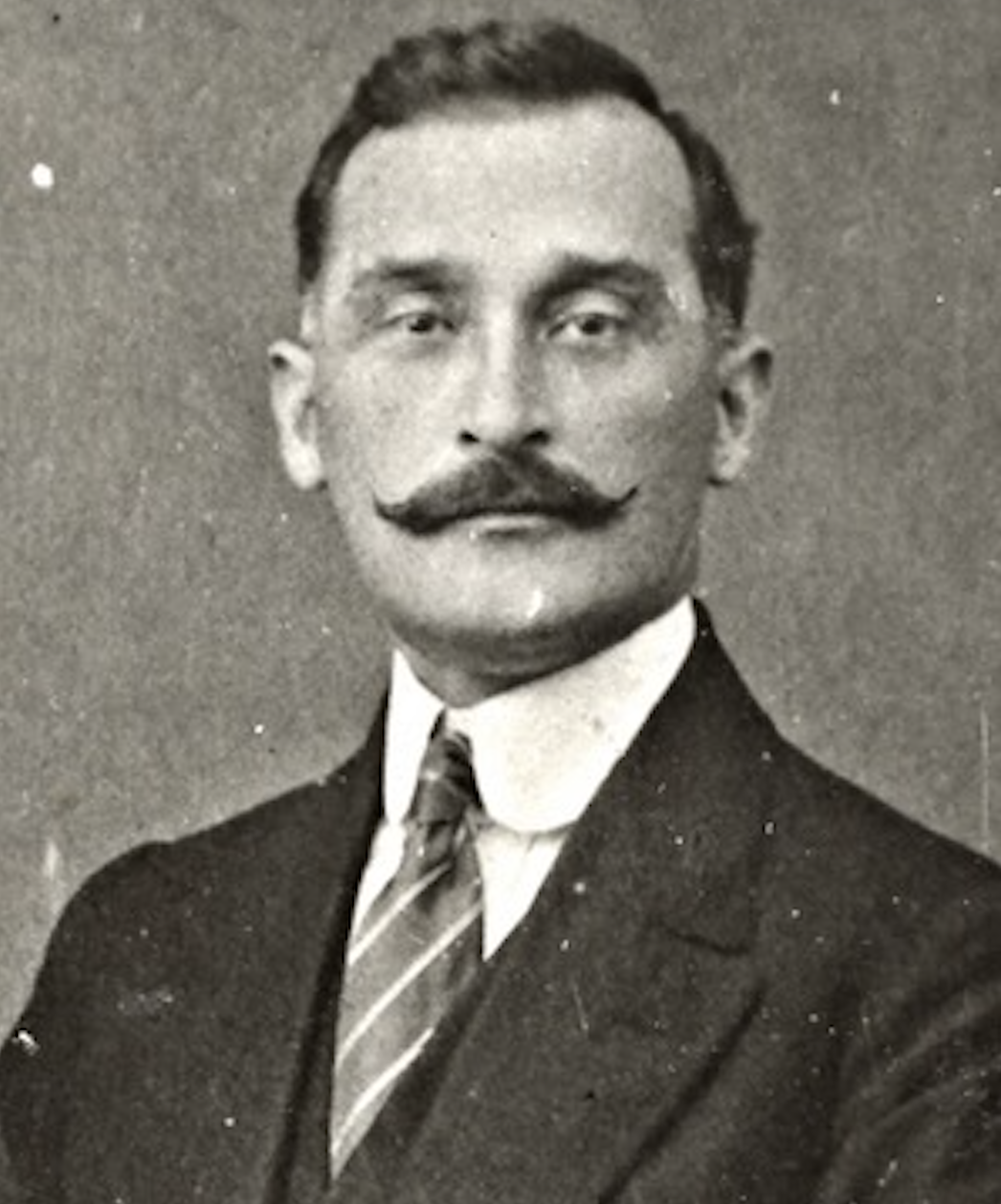

Chairman of the Committee for the Independence of Georgia
- In office March 1923 – August 1924
- Preceded by: Gogita Pagava
- Succeeded by: Office abolished

Member of the Constituent Assembly of Georgia
- In office 12 March 1919 – February 1921

Personal details
- Born: 20 July 1876 Kachreti, Signagsky Uyezd, Tiflis Governorate, Russian Empire
- Died: 1937 (aged 60–61) (presumed dead between 1925-1937) Soviet Union
- Party: Social Democratic Party of Georgia
- Education: Kyiv University
- Profession: Lawyer, politician, revolutionary

Konstantine Emanuelis dze Andronikashvili (Georgian: კონსტანტინე [კოტე] ემანუელის ძე ანდრონიკაშვილი; 20 July 1876 – c. 1937), commonly known in short as Kote, was a Georgian politician and lawyer. A signatory of the Act of Independence of Georgia, he subsequently served as a member of parliament for the Democratic Republic of Georgia.

After Soviet Russia invaded and occupied Georgia, Andronikashvili joined the local anti-Soviet resistance, becoming chairman of the underground Committee for the Independence of Georgia. Following the defeat of the August Uprising, he was arrested and soon disappeared without a trace. He is presumed to have died in captivity or executed during the Great Purge, though no official confirmation of his fate was ever found in the Soviet archives.

== Early life and education ==
Andronikashvili was born to Georgian parents Emanuel Andronikashvili (1846–1916) and Nina Orbeliani, both members of Georgian nobility, in the village of Kachreti, Tiflis Governorate in what is now eastern Georgia, then part of the Russian Empire. He graduated from the 3rd Tiflis Gymnasium in 1897.

To study law, he first enrolled at Moscow University but in the third year transferred to Kyiv University (1899–1900). Due to his participation in the anti-Tsarist student movement in Kyiv, he was expelled, arrested and spent approximately five months in prison. Upon his release, on police orders he had to leave Ukraine within 24 hours and return to his village in Georgia. From 1903 onward, he remained under police surveillance.

== Revolutionary and political career ==
In 1906, Andronikashvili returned to Georgia in Tiflis. He began writing on economic issues for the Georgian-language social-democratic newspapers Elva and Skivi, which were published by Noe Zhordania and Filipp Makharadze.

In November 1917, he was elected to the National Council of Georgia. On 26 May 1918, he signed the Act of Independence of Georgia. Following the declaration of independence, Andronikashvili served in the parliament of the Democratic Republic of Georgia. On 12 March 1919, he was elected to the Constituent Assembly of Georgia representing the Georgian Social Democratic Party. Within the assembly, he chaired the military commission and served as a member of the constitutional commission. During the Red Army invasion of Georgia in February 1921, the Georgian government appointed him as the chief representative for the Telavi Uyezd.

== Anti-Soviet resistance ==
Following the Sovietization of Georgia, an underground "inter-party committee"—the Committee for the Independence of Georgia (Damkom)—was formed in 1922 to plan an anti-Bolshevik uprising. In March 1923, Andronikashvili was elected chairman of the committee.

Following the defeat of the August Uprising in 1924, Soviet authorities discovered the Damkom leadership hiding at the Shiomgvime Monastery. To save members of the uprising from mass execution, Andronikashvili negotiated with Lavrentiy Beria and persuaded him to spare the participants in exchange for all remaining insurgent factions laying down their arms.

During the subsequent trial of the committee members (15 July – 3 August 1925), Andronikashvili and 46 associates were convicted by the Supreme Court of the USSR for organizing the insurrection. He was spared the death penalty and was even allowed a final word, in which he claimed moral victory for the uprising.

== Death and legacy ==
His exact fate after 1925 remains unconfirmed. It is widely presumed that he was executed or died in captivity during the Great Purge around 1937–1938, though official archival confirmation has not yet been discovered.

== See also ==
- Samson Dadiani
- Sardion Tevzadze
- Leo Kereselidze
