= Silibistro Jibladze =

Georgian politician

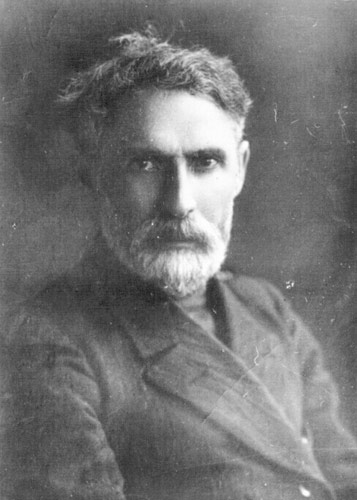
Silibistro (Silva) Jibladze

Silibistro Jibladze (Georgian: სილიბისტრო ჯიბლაძე; 1859–1922) was a Georgian Social Democrat.

Silibistro "Silva" Jibladze was the Marxist founder of Mesame Dasi ('Third Group'), a Georgian socialist group, and revolutionary. He was a member of the founding assembly of Georgia. He died while engaged in underground resistance to the Sovietization of Georgia.

== Early years ==
He was born in the family of a deacon. In 1872, at the age of 13, he entered the Ozurgeti Theological School. While studying at the school, he lived in the Totibadze family, where Anton Totibadze, later the dean, also grew up. At the school, advanced students gathered around Jibladze, among whom was Egnate Ninoshvili.

Jibladze and Ninoshvili organized a one-week strike in support of school inspector Liadze, who was dismissed from his job due to his liberal leanings. Due to the strike, Ninoshvili, as a peasant, was expelled from the school, while Jibladze, as a representative of the clergy, escaped the expulsion. As a sign of solidarity with Ninoshvili, Jibladze also stopped studying, but at Ninoshvili's request, he returned to the school and helped Ninoshvili to receive home education.

After graduating from the school, from 1879, he studied at the Tbilisi Theological Seminary, where he was considered a good student. He soon began reading forbidden literature and forming secret circles in the seminary. In 1885, while in his sixth year, while he was in hospital, his room was searched and banned literature was found. According to the decision of the rector of the seminary, deacon Chudetsky, he was expelled with a "wolf ticket". Jibladze responded by beating Chudetsky and pulling his hair, for which he was sent to the disciplinary battalion in Kharkiv for either two or three years, which was subsequently extended to four years. (Chudetsky, who had banned the Georgian language as medium of instruction in the seminary and described it as "dogspeak", was later assassinated by a Georgian student expelled from the seminary for his nationalist beliefs.)

== Political activity under the Tsar ==
In 1889, he was released from penal military service and, physically weakened, returned to Tbilisi. His friends Zakaria Chichinadze and Noe Zhordania sent him to Abastumani for treatment. Having recovered, Jibladze returned to Guria, where he re-established a relationship with Egnate Ninoshvili, became friends with Isidore Ramishvili and Arsen Tsitlidze.

Zhordania supplied Jibladze with banned literature. Jibladze started working in the "Phylloxera Committee", which represented the body for the fight against phylloxera and where Egnate Ninoshvili, Nikolay Chkheidze and young people expelled from schools were employed, using the activities of the committee and frequent trips to the provinces to educate the peasants and spread revolutionary propaganda.

During his work in the committee, Jibladze distanced himself from populist ideology and came closer to Marxism. In December 1892, he attended the meeting in Zestaponi, after which he actively participated in the work of Mesame Dasi, the "third group" of Georgian nationalists, liberals and socialists. On 7 May 1894, at the burial of Ninoshvili in the village of Chanchati, the program of Mesame Dasi prepared by Zhordania was delivered. At one point he was introduced to Joseph Stalin, also a member of Mesame Dasi.

Beginning in 1897, he lived in Tbilisi, where he worked as a manager of the warehouse of the Caucasus Economic Society. This warehouse turned into a center for all illegal workers, banned literature was received here, and meetings were held. Jibladze, one of the organizers of workers' strikes in Georgia, was actively involved in the formation of workers' circles in railway workshops and various factories. He practically became the leader of Mesame Dasi in Georgia, worked for its organizational formation, and in 1898 even formed the Tbilisi Social-Democratic Committee, of which he was the chairman. He started working at the newspaper "Kvalshi", which he and his comrades used to conduct propaganda-agitation among wider circles of workers.

In 1900, he went to Saint Petersburg to establish a connection with the Russian Social Democratic Labour Party center, where he was helped by Isidore Kvitsaridze, who lived there. On 22 March 1901 he was arrested by the police, and in the summer of 1902, together with Vasil Tsabadze, he was deported to Gori, where they helped formed illegal organizations among workers and soon created the Gori Social-Democratic Organization.

After moving from Gori to Guria in August of the same year, he and Zhordania helped organize the Guria peasant movement that ultimately led to an uprising that gave birth to the short-lived Gurian Republic. Jibladze and Zhordania had to contend with opposition within the RSDLP to support for this movement, as orthodox Marxists such as Chkheidze saw no room for peasants in an ostensibly worker-led movement. Nonetheless as the movement gathered strength the RSDLP took on an important role in leading it, while still maintaining the internal debate that soon produced, on a larger stage, the split between the Bolsheviks and the Mensheviks.

At the beginning of 1903, he was elected a member of the Caucasus Union Committee of the RSDLP. In the same year, he was arrested and, after four months of imprisonment in Kutaisi and Poti prisons, he was exiled to Siberia for five years, from where he returned with amnesty in the summer of 1905. After the split in the RSDLP, he was still publishing anti-Bolshevik letters from Siberia, and after the amnesty speech, he joined Zhordania in the fight against Bolshevik influences in the party.

After the defeat of the revolution of 1905, by the decision of the party, he was assigned to lead the implementation of terrorist acts. In January 1906, Arsena Georgiashvili, directed by Jibladze, killed the Deputy Crown Prince of the Caucasus, General Fyodor Griaznov. Jibladze also organized the liquidation of several Bolsheviks. He collaborated in the following newspapers: "Beam", "Gantiyadi", and "Elva".

On 3-9 January 1909 he participated in the RSDLP Paris Conference. On 23 September 1909 he was arrested by the police on Tumanov Street, and in 1910, by order of the Governor-General, he was exiled to Rostov-on-Don for five years, from where he escaped in May 1910 and illegally lived and worked in St. Petersburg, being a member of the St. Petersburg Committee of the RSDLP. In 1913, he stayed illegally in Tbilisi and Baku for a short time. After the expiration of his exile in 1914, he returned to Georgia and worked in the party organizations of Tbilisi and Chiatura. In August 1914, he participated in the Borjomi conference of the Social Democratic Party. He was a member of the Communist Party of Ukraine. On 28 August 1915 he was arrested again in Tbilisi, but due to a serious illness, he was released from prison under open police surveillance.

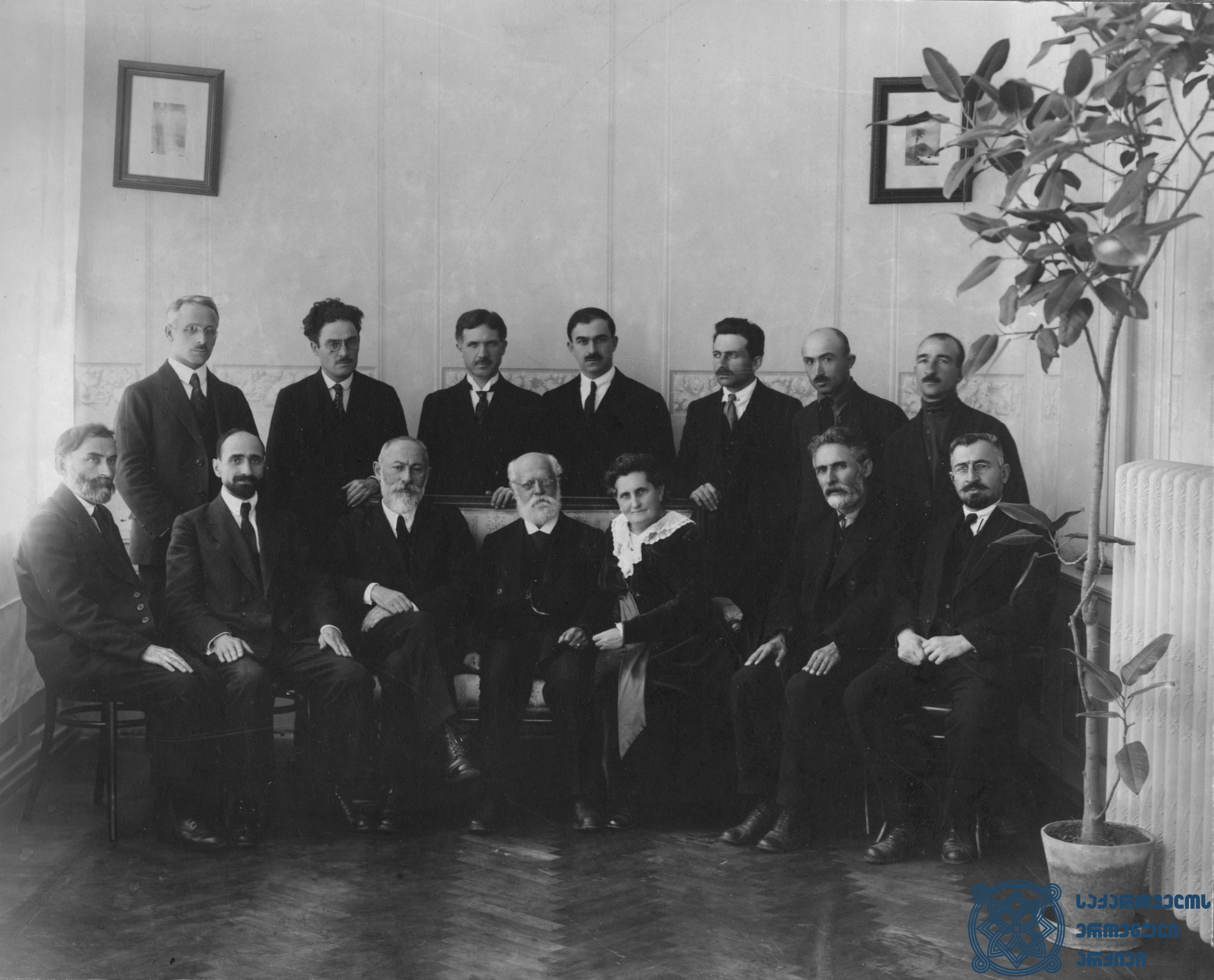
Karl Kautsky with the Georgian Social-Democrats, Tbilisi, 1920. In the first row: S. Devdariani, Noe Ramishvili, Noe Zhordania, Karl Kautsky and his wife Luise, Silibistro Jibladze, Razhden Arsenidze; in the second row: Kautsky's secretary Olberg, Victor Tevzaia, K. Gvarjaladze, Konstantine Sabakhtarashvili, S. Tevzadze, Avtandil Urushadze, R. Tsintsabadze

== Political activities during the Russian Revolution ==
After the February Revolution of 1917, he was a member of the Executive Committee of the Tbilisi Council of Workers' and Soldiers' Deputies. From November 1917 he was elected a member of the National Council of Georgia, from February 1918 he was a member of the Transcaucasian Sejm. On 26 May 1918 he signed the Act of Independence of Georgia. During 1918, he was a member of the Parliament of Georgia. In February 1919, he was elected a member of the Tbilisi City Council. In March 1919, he was elected as a member of the founding Constituent Assembly of Georgia. On 12 March, as the oldest member of the Constituent Assembly, he opened its first session. He was a member of the election, military and recommendation commissions.

After the Soviet occupation in 1921, he stayed in Georgia and joined the resistance movement. On 10 April 1921 he presided over a conference that adopted a seven-point resolution and proposed the government of the Georgian SSR to hold a referendum, in which case they promised that the Menshevik party would limit itself to open criticism and cooperation. Faced with the Bolshevik regime's refusal to compromise and repressions, Jibladze started to create a united front of resistance.

On 13 July 1921 he was arrested for responding to Stalin's report at a meeting held at the Nadzaladev club. In autumn 1921 he was released from prison due to illness. After his release, he returned to underground activities. Jibladze was the initiator of Catholicos-Patriarch Ambrosius's appeal to the Genoa Conference, in which he requested the liberation of Georgia from Soviet occupation.

On 17 February 1922 Jibladze died of heart failure in a safe house. The Cheka discovered his location, kidnapped his body and buried it in the Russian cemetery of Vera under secret circumstances.
