= Paul Olberg =

Journalist

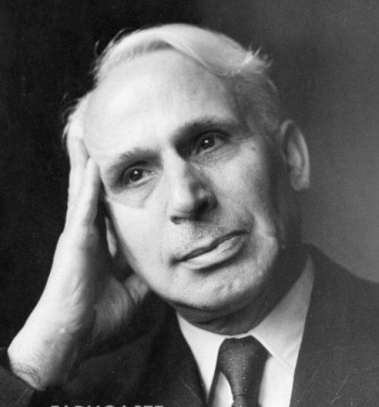
Paul Olberg.

Paul Olberg (born: Hirsch Schmuschkowitz, 22 November 1878 – 4 May 1960) was a Latvian-born German-Swedish journalist and a Menshevik. In 1917, after the October Revolution, went into exile in Berlin, where he lived for many years. He worked as a correspondent for Swedish social democratic newspapers. In 1933, he fled to Stockholm; that year, he became Secretary of the Stockholm-based Socialist Rescue Committee for German Refugees.

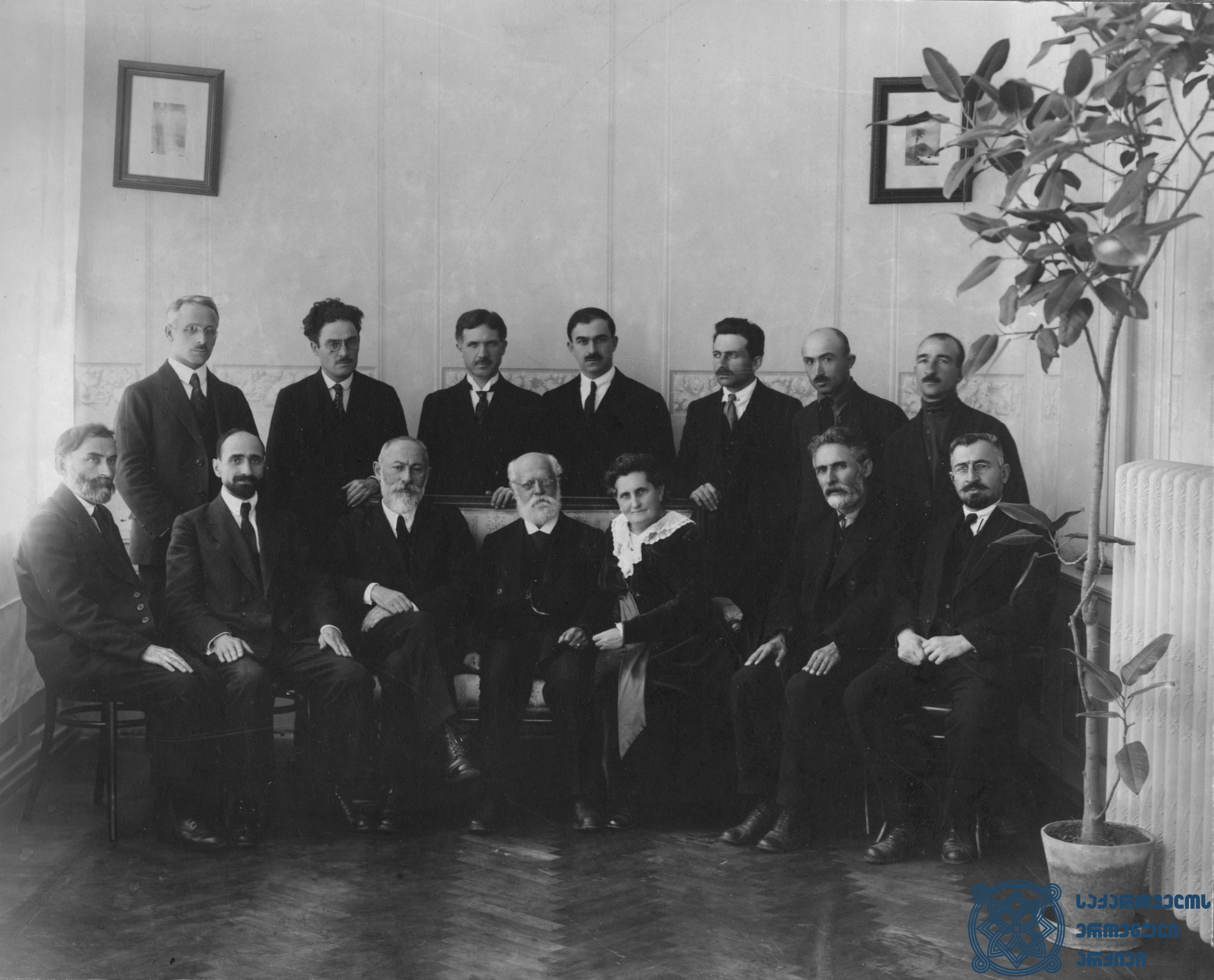
Karl Kautsky with the Georgian Social-Democrats, Tbilisi, 1920. In the first row: S. Devdariani, Noe Ramishvili, Noe Zhordania, Karl Kautsky and his wife Luise, Silibistro Jibladze, Razhden Arsenidze; in the second row: Kautsky's secretary Olberg, Victor Tevzaia, K. Gvarjaladze, Konstantine Sabakhtarashvili, S. Tevzadze, Avtandil Urushadze, R. Tsintsabadze

Olberg was Scandinavian representative of the Jewish Labor Committee, and headed the JLC's Stockholm office; from 1945, he coordinated the JLC's postwar services to refugees in Scandinavia.

In 1957 Olberg was a member of the coordinating committee of the International Jewish Labor Bund.

== Bibliography ==
- Briefe aus Sowjet-Russland, 1919
- Die Bauernrevolution in Russland: Die alte und die neue Politik Sowjet-Russlands, 1922
- Die Tragödie des Baltikums: Die Annexion der freien Republiken Estland, Lettland und Litauen, 1941
- Det moderna Egypten i det andra världskriget, Natur & Kultur, 1943
- Antisemitism i Sovjet, Natur & Kultur, 1953
