= Seit Devdariani =

Georgian philosopher and political activist

- სეით დევდარიანი
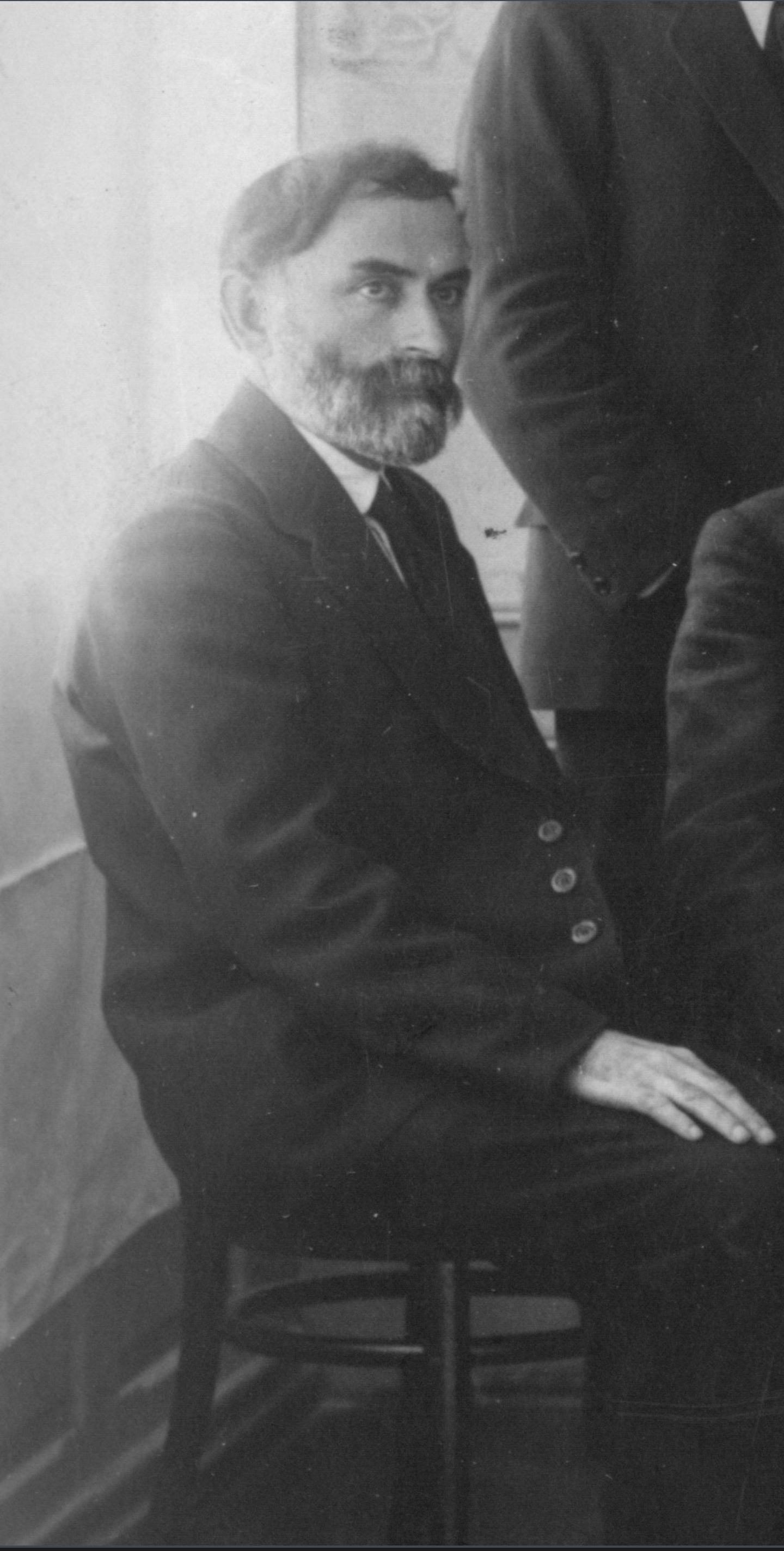
- Seit Devdariani in 1920
- Born: 1879; Kutaisi
- Died: September 21, 1937 (aged 57–58); Tbilisi
- Occupations: Philosopher and political activist

Seit Sardionis dze Devdariani (Georgian: სეით დევდარიანი) (1879, Kutaisi – 21 September 1937, Tbilisi) was a Georgian philosopher and political activist who was a deputy of the National Council of Georgia and the Constituent Assembly of Georgia (1919-1921). He was executed during Joseph Stalin's Great Purge.

== Biography ==
In 1898, he graduated from Tbilisi Theological Seminary. He subsequently studied in Tartu, Kharkov and the United States and received a law degree.

During his studies, he became close to his classmate Ioseb Jugashvili, with whom he shared a house. Devdariani organized a reading circle, held away from the seminary and their house, where they studied The Communist Manifesto, Kautsky'sThe Erfurt Program, and Engels's The Development of Scientific Socialism. Unable to afford copies of these works, they borrowed them from bookstore owner Zakaria Chichinadze and copied them by hand in the evening. They did the same with Marx's Capital. They hid these books and their handwritten transcriptions whenever visited by the monk Dmitrii, the seminary's inspector.

Devdariani brought the future leader of the USSR, who considered Devdariani his first teacher for a long time, to the Social-Democratic Union Mesame Dasi ("Third Group"). In 1906-1907, he personally saved Stalin from arrest and gave him refuge in his ancestral home in Imereti.

In 1900, Devdariani joined the Menshevik Party. He was actively involved in the social-democratic press, wrote philosophical and political articles. During the Russian Revolution of 1917, he led the Mensheviks in Kharkiv and was elected a member of the Kharkiv City Duma. At the end of 1917 he left for Georgia to participate in the creation of an independent state there.

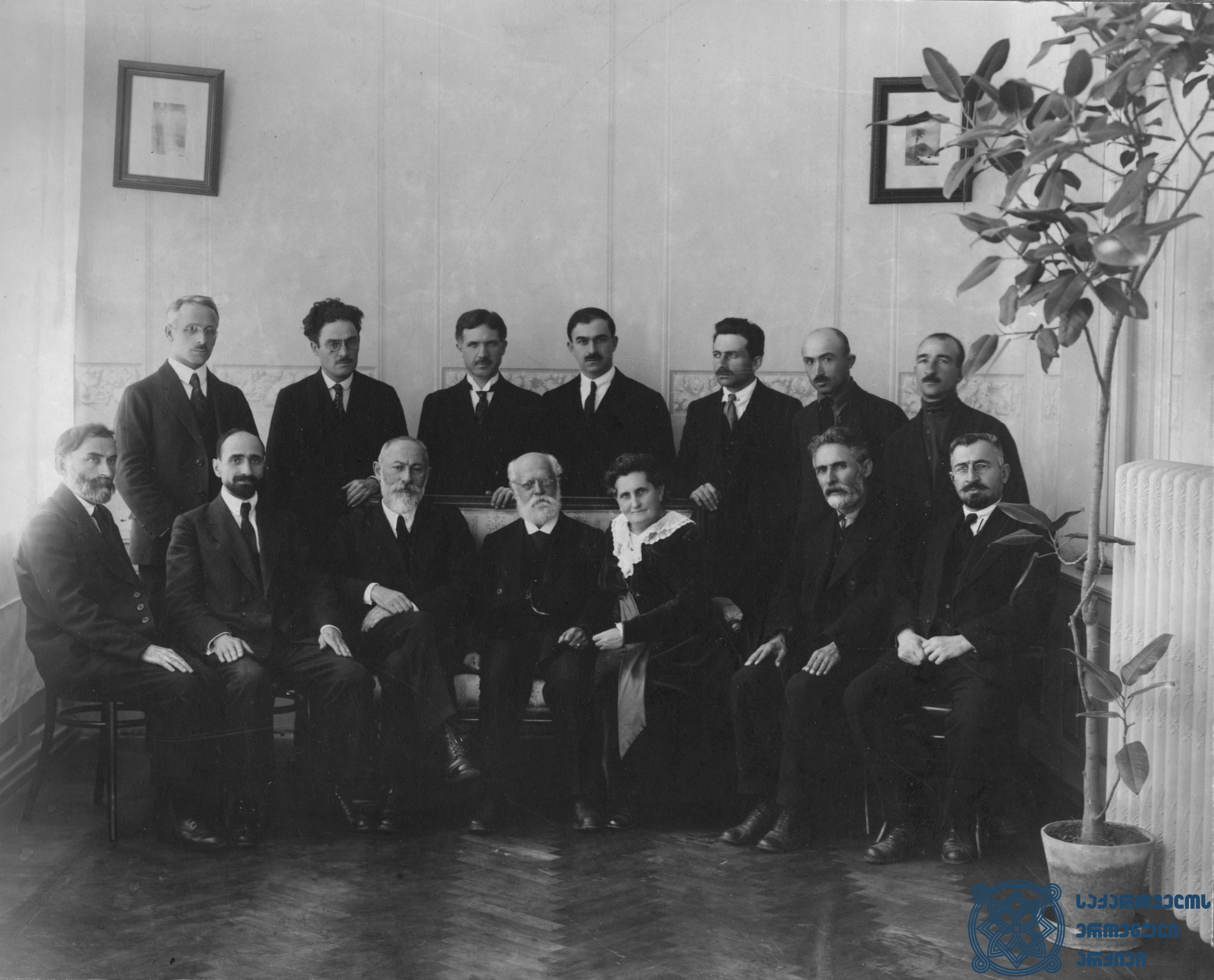
Karl Kautsky with the Georgian Social-Democrats, Tbilisi, 1920. In the first row: S. Devdariani, Noe Ramishvili, Noe Zhordania, Karl Kautsky and his wife Luise, Silibistro Jibladze, Razhden Arsenidze; in the second row: Kautsky's secretary Olberg, Victor Tevzaia, K. Gvarjaladze, Konstantine Sabakhtarashvili, S. Tevzadze, Avtandil Urushadze, R. Tsintsabadze

After the fall of the Georgian republic, Devdariani became involved in the anti-Soviet opposition. Between 1921 and 1924 he was Chairman of the underground Central Committee of the Georgian Social-Democratic party, in 1922-1924 a member of the underground Committee of Independence of Georgia. After that he devoted himself entirely to philosophy and history.

In 1937, he was arrested in Tbilisi and executed by the Soviet government.

Devdariani was the author of several works on philosophy, including a three-volume history of Georgian thought which was lost after his execution. Only one chapter, that on the 18th-century Catholicos Anton I, survived to be published in 1989.

== Literature ==
- Levan Urushadze. Devdariani Seit. In: Encyclopedia "Sakartvelo", Vol. 2, Tbilisi, 2012, p. 356 (In Georgian).
