= Victor Tevzaia =

Victor Vasilis dze Tevzaia (Georgian: ვიქტორ თევზაია) (1883 – 1932) was a Georgian Social-Democratic politician, diplomat, and economist, specializing in agrarian questions. He also published using pseudonyms, Машинадзе (Mashinadze) and Georgien.

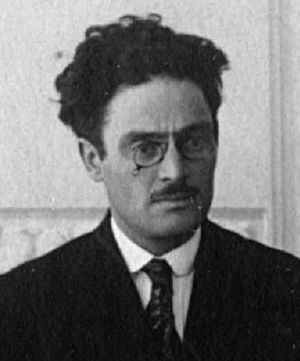
Victor Tevzaia

During the Russian Revolution of 1905, Tevzaia headed a Social-Democratic organization in the Black Sea port town of Poti, where he organized a strike of railway workers. He then lived in Western Europe and obtained the post of Privatdozent on the law faculty of the University of Geneva. He again became involved in the Caucasian politics after the 1917 February Revolution ousted the Russian monarchy during World War I. In December 1917, he was part of the delegation of the Transcaucasian Commissariat that signed a truce with the Ottoman Empire in Erzincan.

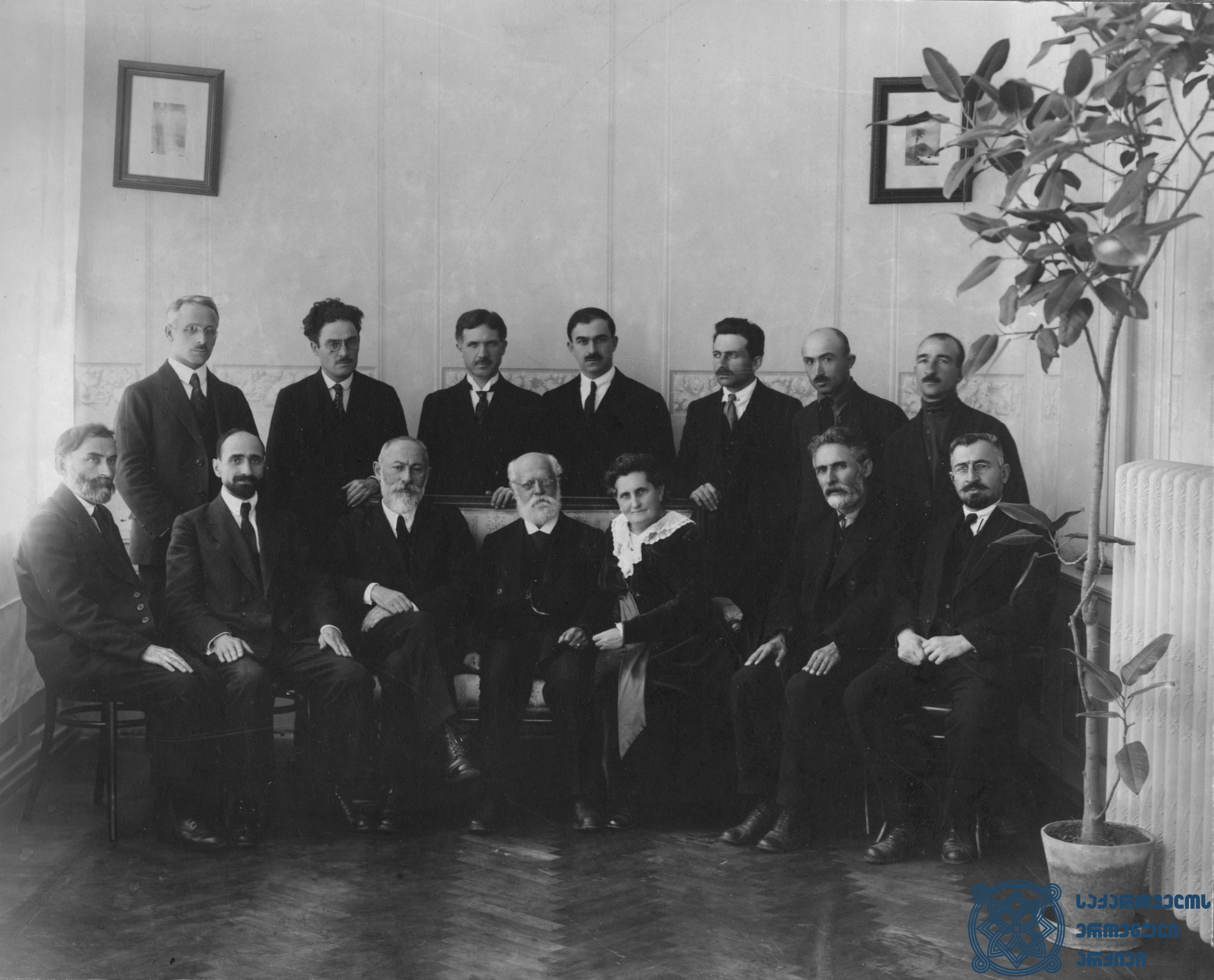
Karl Kautsky with the Georgian Social-Democrats, Tbilisi, 1920. In the first row: S. Devdariani, Noe Ramishvili, Noe Zhordania, Karl Kautsky and his wife Luise, Silibistro Jibladze, Razhden Arsenidze; in the second row: Kautsky's secretary Olberg, Victor Tevzaia, K. Gvarjaladze, Konstantine Sabakhtarashvili, S. Tevzadze, Avtandil Urushadze, R. Tsintsabadze

After Georgia's declaration of independence in 1918, Tevzaia was sent as an envoy to the People's Republic of Ukraine in August 1918 and a month later he became the first ambassador of Georgia in Kiev. In 1919, he was elected to the Constituent Assembly of Georgia. From 1918 to 1920, he was a member of the central committee of the Georgian Social-Democratic Party, which he left in 1923, in the aftermath of the sovietization of Georgia. He died in Tbilisi in 1932, of apparent suicide.
