= Isidore Ramishvili =

- ისიდორე რამიშვილი
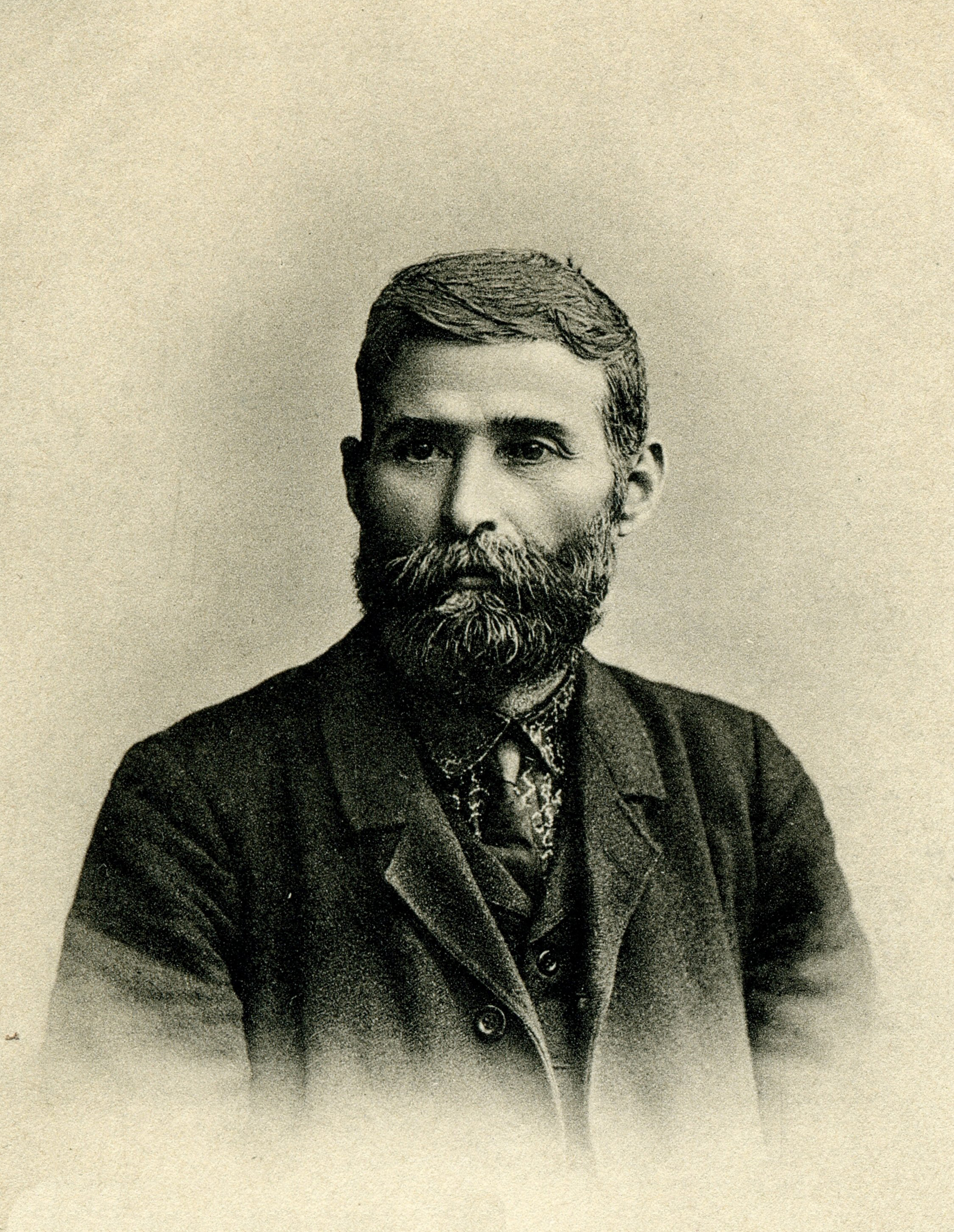
- Isidore Ramishivili in 1906
- Born: June 7, 1859; Didivani, Ozurgeti uezd, Kutaisi Governorate, Russian Empire
- Died: 14 November 1937 (aged 78)
- Cause of death: Execution by firing squad
- Resting place: Unknown
- Education: Tiflis Theological Seminary (1885)
- Occupations: Politician, journalist, teacher
- Political party: Russian Social Democratic Labour Party (until 1917); Georgian Social Democratic Party
- Spouses: Nadasi Kalandadze (m. 1892; died 1900); Natalya Semiakina (m. 1910)
- Children: 5

Signature
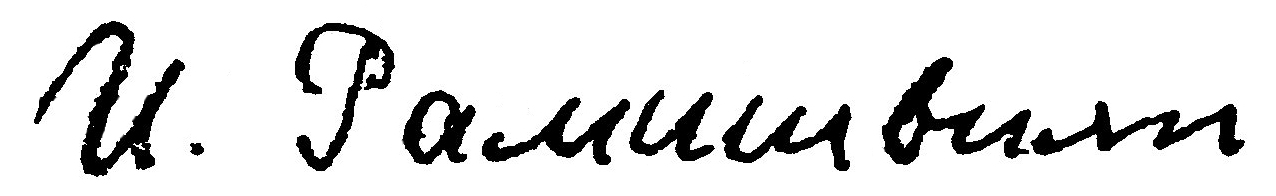

Isidore Ramishvili (Georgian: ისიდორე რამიშვილი) (7 June 1859 – 14 November 1937) was a Georgian Social Democratic politician, journalist, and one of the leaders of Menshevik movement in Imperial Russia.

Ramishvili rose to prominence during the 1905 Russian Revolution as an outspoken critic of the Tsar government in the Duma and an eloquent speaker at mass rallies or party meetings. Repeatedly arrested and exiled by both Tsarist and Bolshevik authorities, he is considered a symbol of resistance and resilience.

== Early years ==
Born to a poor family in a remote mountainous gorge of Guria, Ramishvili finished the Ozurgeti theological school before entering the Tiflis Theological Seminary. He graduated from the seminary in 1885, being deeply critical of the Tsarist regime and sympathetic to the Narodniks. Ramishvili refused to continue his theological studies and chose to create educational places where the poorest people could gain some knowledge. In 1887, he returned home and organized the whole village in order to build a two-year school where he served as a first teacher. Noe Ramishvili, the future political leader of the Mensheviks, was one of his pupils.

Later, Ramishvili founded a school in Batumi with the help of the Society for the Spreading of Literacy among Georgians as well as a first popular library, also used as a place for political meetings. He was publishing articles in newspapers under the names Isramishvili and I.R.

== Political career ==
In 1892, Ramishvili took part in an inaugurating conference of the Mesame Dasi political movement, later transformed into a branch of the Social Democratic Party. He embraced the Marxist ideology and, gifted by pedagogical talent, set to spread it among the masses through different underground cells.

While at work as a teacher in Batumi, Ramishvili was actively involved in revolutionary activities, supporting the strikes, announced by local workers, and becoming one of their main organizers. For this reason, a police hunt began in 1903, although his first arrest occurred two years later in Tiflis. After a two-month imprisonment at the Metekhi prison, Ramishvili was released as Nicholas II pledged to carry out reforms and take into account some of the popular demands. He was personally trying to halt bloodshed going on between the Armenians and Tatars in Tiflis by acting as a mediator between them and, at the same time, negotiating with a Tsar viceroy in the Transcaucasia.

During the Russian Revolution of 1905, Ramishvili was elected to the First State Duma for the Kutais Governorate and became one of its leading Menshevik deputies. He was present at 4th Congress of the Russian Social Democratic Labour Party held in Stockholm in 1906 and 5th Congress organized in London a year later. Arrested in 1908, he remained in exile in Astrakhan and Samara until the Russian Revolution of 1917.

Ramishvili served as a member of the Executive Committee of the Petrograd Soviet. He led a special committee established to organize the Petrograd Burial Procession of March 1917. Shortly, the party sent him to Baku to serve as an interim Labour Minister.

Following the Bolshevik October Revolution, Ramishvili returned to his native Georgia, where he was elected to the Constituent Assembly of the Democratic Republic of Georgia in 1919. He signed the Declaration of Independence, adopted on 26 May 1918, and organized the creation of guerilla forces in his native Guria region against the invading Ottoman forces. From summer 1918 to September 1920, he was an envoy of the Government of Georgia to autonomous Abkhazia.

== Repressions and death ==
After the Red Army invasion of Georgia early in 1921 and subsequent fall of the democratic republic, Ramishvili was involved in resistance. He was arrested along with other social-democrat leaders on 13 July 1921 and placed in the Metekhi prison again. On 16 December 1922, Ramishvili was among a group of 52 prisoners exiled to the Russian town of Kashin.

In 1930, Ramishvili was sent to Astrakhan. He spent several years also in Tashkent and Khujand in the Central Asia before being allowed to return home in 1934. The next year, Ramishvili was detained and expelled to Vladikavkaz where he lived in extremely tough conditions with financial assistance from his family.

Accused of membership in an outlawed Menshevik ""counter-revolutionary group", Ramishvili was arrested here, dispatched to Tbilisi and sentenced to death by the Special troika on 14 November 1937. He was executed on the same day.

In 1989, Ramishvili was declared innocent of his charges and rehabilitated by the Astrakhan district court.

== Family ==
Isidore was the 9th among eleven children of Ivane Ramishvili and Maya Chkhetia.

Ramishvili married Nadasi Kalandadze (1866–1900) in 1892. They had four children: Mariam, Jacob, Elene and Ilia.

In 1910, while being a widow in exile, Ramishvili married political activist Natalya Semiakina. Their only child Irina died at the age of 1.

== Memory ==
The school in the village of Didivani, established by Isidore Ramishvili in 1887, was named after him in 2016.

== Gallery ==
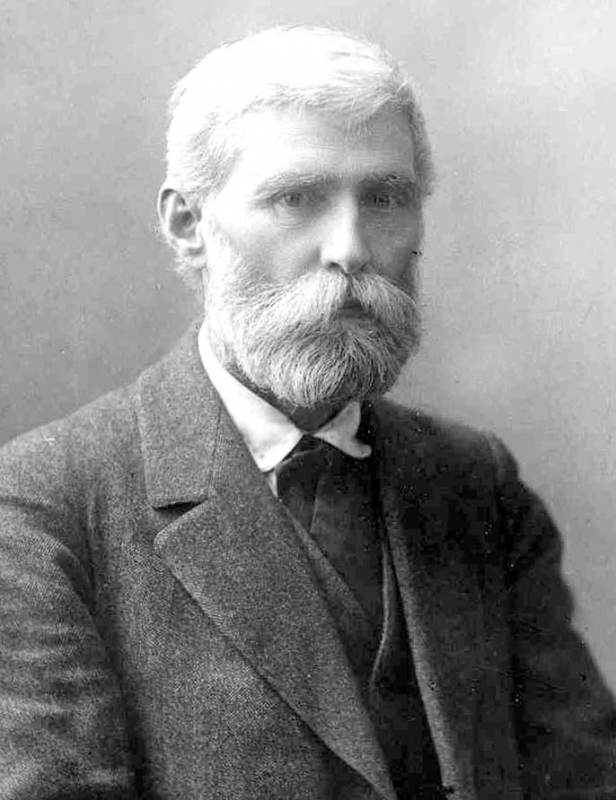
Isidore Ramishvili in 1917

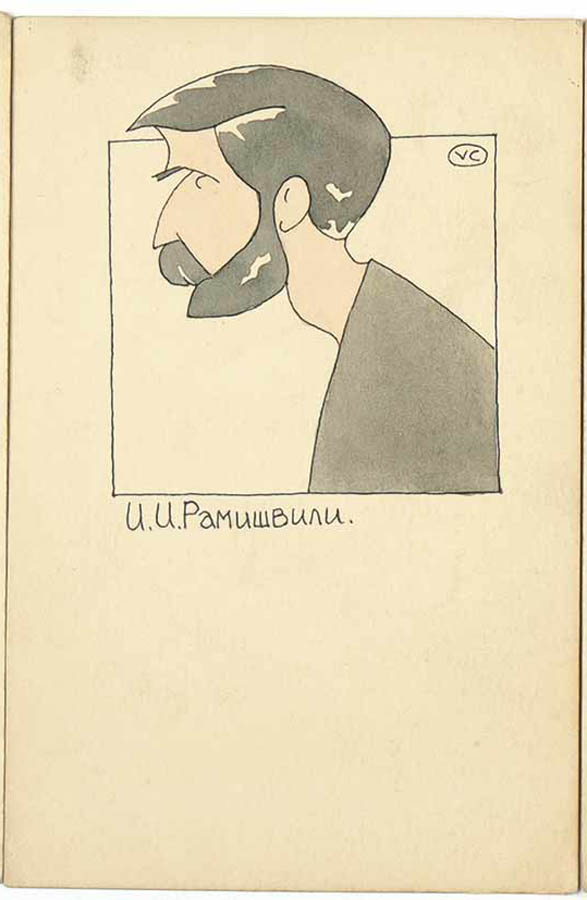
Isidore Ramishvili. Drawing by V. Carrick

Georgian members of I State Duma, 1906
