= Noe Zhordania =

Georgian journalist, intellectual, revolutionary and politician

- ნოე ჟორდანია
- Zhordania c. 1920

Head of the Government of the Democratic Republic of Georgia in Exile
- In office 18 March 1921 – 11 January 1953
- Preceded by: Himself as Prime Minister of Georgia
- Succeeded by: Evgeni Gegechkori

2nd Prime Minister of Georgia
- In office 24 June 1918 – 18 March 1921
- President: Nikolay Chkheidze (President of Parliament)
- Preceded by: Noe Ramishvili
- Succeeded by: Budu Mdivani (As Chairman of the Council of People's Commissars)

Personal details
- Born: January 15, 1868 Lanchkhuti, Guria, Kutais Governorate, Russian Empire (present-day Lanchkhuti, Guria, Georgia)
- Died: January 11, 1953 (aged 84) Paris, France
- Resting place: Leuville Cemetery, near Paris
- Party: Social Democratic (Menshevik) Party of Georgia
- Spouse: Ina Koreneva
- Children: 4
- Education: Tbilisi Spiritual Seminary; Warsaw Veterinarian Institute
- Profession: Politician

Noe Zhordania (Note: Also transliterated as Noah Jordania) (Georgian: ნოე ჟორდანია [nɔɛ ʒɔrdɑniɑ]; Russian: Ной Никола́евич Жорда́ния, romanized: Noy Nikoláevich Zhordániya; 15 January [O.S. 3 January] 1868 – January 11, 1953) was a Georgian journalist and Menshevik politician. He played an eminent role in the socialist revolutionary movement in the Russian Empire, and later chaired the government of the Democratic Republic of Georgia from July 24, 1918, until March 18, 1921, when the Bolshevik Russian Red Army invasion of Georgia forced him into exile to France. There Zhordania led the government-in-exile until his death in 1953.

== Biography ==
=== Early life and background ===
Zhordania was born on 15 January [O.S. 3 January] 1868 to a petty landowner family living in the village of Lanchkhuti in Guria, western Georgia, then part of the Kutais Governorate of Imperial Russia.

According to Redjeb Jordania (born in 1921), son of Noe Jordania (Zhordania), his lineage traces back to three Italian brothers who emigrated from Genoa to Georgia. One of them was a gardener, and the others were merchants. One settled in Mingrelia and became the ancestor of the Zhordanias from Tsaishi (Georgian: ცაიში). Another moved to Arhavi (Georgian: არქაბი), and his descendants became the Zhordanias of Arhavi. The third was granted serfs and estates by the House of Gurieli in Lanchkhuti, and remained in Guria. He was the ancestor of the Zhordanias from Lanchkhuti, including Radjeb (Redjeb) Zhordania, grandfather of Noe Zhordania.

In his early years, Radjeb became an orphan and was taken to Mingrelia by his uncles. Later, he returned to his hometown of Lanchkhuti, but was not welcomed by his relatives. Consequently, he moved to Shukhuti and demanded his share of the family property. He was granted a plot of land, where he built an oda (Georgian: ოდა)—a traditional house typical of the Guria region —married the daughter of Apakidze, and settled there between 1825 and 1830.

Later, he participated in the Crimean War, where he attained the rank of captain and was eventually killed in action. He had four sons: Butchu, Potine, Niko, and Iosef. Niko, the father of Noe and Gulchino Zhordania, was the village scribe, a lawyer, and a court mediator. Kristine Chikovani, Noe's mother, was Mingrelian.

=== Education ===
He had his primary education in a Lanchkhuti public school. Afterwards, he graduated from the Ozurgeti Orthodox Theological Academy. He then moved to Tbilisi where he graduated from the Georgian Orthodox Theological Seminary, a prestigious academic institution at the time (just a few years later Josef Stalin would enter that same academy). However, while Noe's parents hoped that their child would become a priest, from an early age he started to disbelieve in God. He wrote:

'God is Nature herself; as for a white-bearded deity, seated upon a throne, such a personage simply does not exist'. 'I thought to myself: If Nature's lord and master is Nature itself, then who is the rightful lord and master of mankind? The general opinion was that the Tsar (King) was the lord over the people, and that the Tsar(King) was himself appointed by God. But if God did not exist any more, the Tsar(King) could not be his representative. I was therefore at a loss to understand by whose command and authority he sat upon his throne.'

In the academy he was the head of an illegal student association that was opposing the drawbacks of the present situation in Academy. At the same time he was reading forbidden books, such as the Russian revolutionary-democratic literature of (Nikolay Chernyshevsky and Alexander Herzen), and familiarized himself with the content of populist literature, magazines and newspapers provided by Zakaria Chichinadze. In 1891 he moved to Warsaw, Poland, and attended the Warsaw Veterinarian Institute. During this period young Zhordania understood the basics of Marxism. In his memories Zhordania described his political evolution in 1892 as a reflection of Russia's transition from socialism to Marxism. Specifically he meant the period after 1891, when he left his homeland to continue his studies abroad. With Filipp Makharadze, Noe Zhordania started a close correspondence with other Georgian intellectuals, namely Silvester Dzhibladze and Egnate Ninoshvili, by sending them illegal Marxist literature. He was impressed by "Mr. L. Tikhomirov's Grief", a booklet written by Georgi Plekhanov. In Warsaw, apart from Marxism, Zhordania also became acquainted with the Polish national movement, which fought for the autonomy of Poland. In 1892, he was forced to leave for Georgia due to Pneumonia.

=== Early career ===
Zhordania in 1891

When he came back to Georgia, he propagated the Marxist ideas among the workers of Tbilisi, and in the 1890s he became a leader of the first legal Marxist organization in Georgia, called the Mesame Dasi (the Third Group). In late December 1892, Noe Zhordania emerged on the political scene. He attended the Marxian meetings at the Aleksandre Pushkin House in Kvirila, and eventually became a member of the first Marxist group. Other famous members were: Nikolay Chkheidze, Eugene Vatsadze, Mikha Tskhakaia, Joseph Kakabadze, Razhden Kaladze, Dmitry Kalandarishvili, Isidore Ramishvili, Arsen Tsitlidze, Isidore Kvitsaridze and Silibistro Jibladze. The group ultimately failed to reach an agreement on certain issues and thus, Noe Zhordania, with Kibladze and Egnate Ninoshvili, were left in charge of creating action program for the group. They outlined importance of the working class in overthrowing the old society, and added the national question in their programme. The programme was adopted and then, in 1894, published in the journal "Moambe". It was based on the following provisions: 1.The person's physical well-being 2. Freedom of the individual and state 3. National identity of the people, based on social label. Later on, the group got the name Mesame Dasi. In May 1893, fearing of possible arrest, Zhordania traveled to Europe from Batumi. When the order of his arrest was released in Lanchkhuti, he was already in Geneva. There he met other Marxist group members: Georgi Plekhanov, Leo Deutsch, and Vera Zasulich. There he read Marxist literature and explored the Swiss workers and peasants' life, writing down and then sending his notes to the journal Kvali (Georgian: კვალი). In 1894, he was tried by the Russian authorities for his participation in the "League of Freedom of Georgia". In 1895, he went to Paris and studied at the Bibliothèque nationale de France for 3 months, became acquainted with Jules Guesde, Paul Lafargue and other French socialists in the meantime. He remained in Paris for four months before going back to Geneva and, from there he headed to Germany, the birthplace of Marxist ideologies. He settled in Stuttgart for two reasons: first, there he met Karl Kautsky, and second, there was not a single Georgian or Russian in Stuttgart who could prevent Zhordania from learning the German language. In order to familiarize himself with the political economy of the bourgeoisie, Zhordania moved to Munich. There he enrolled at the university and followed the course of Professor Franz Brentano. At the beginning of 1896 Zhordania left Munich and traveled to Berlin, where he attended the lectures of Richard Wagner. While living in Germany Zhordania wrote the following articles for "Kvali": "Friedrich Engels" (1895) (Georgian: ფრიდრიხ ენგელსი), "the village and agricultural growing in Germany" (1985) (Georgian: სოფელი და სასოფლო შკოლა გერმანიაში), "Political parties in Germany" (1897) (Georgian: პოლიტიკური პარტიები გერმანიაში), "Bismarck" (1898) (Georgian: ბისმარკი).

In March 1897, Zhordania moved to London, England with Varlam Cherkezishvili, a known photographer, who back then lived with the Wilson family. At the British Museum he studied literature from all around the world, including from Georgia. In 1897 Zordania returned to Georgia. Upon his arrival the country was split into two camps: on one hand, the right-wing ideology headed by Ilia Chavchavadze called "Iberian's camp", and the other left-wing ideology called "Kvali camp". In November 1897, Zhordania organized two consortium, one in Tbilisi and the other in Lanchkhuti. Aiming to buy the journal "Kvali", he would later initiate a dialogue with Anastasya Tumanishvili and Giorgi Tsereteli, the directors of the famous magazine. In January 1898, "Kvali" became one of the first Marxists legal body. It was also the first example in the Russian Empire of the Socialists having a legal organ. The Social Democrats, meanwhile were also illegally stamping brochures, leaflets, and newspapers. In 1899 they released the first printed leaflets called "proclamation", which advised Georgian workers to join the European workers for the first of May. The proclamation was written by Zhordania, and printed by Vlasa Mgeladze. This increased the tensions between the two camps, and in 1900 the magazines of the two parties started to print a heated debate between the each other.

Clashes between the workers and the army took place on 1 May 1901. Many activists became targets of the police and Noe Zhordania being one of them. Trying to save himself, he decided to flee to Europe on the grounds of health problems and borrowed 300 rubles from David Sarajishvili. Shortly afterwards he was arrested in Kutaisi, where he was given charges after eight months in prison and then transferred first to Tbilisi, and later to Metekhi. He was charged with the crime of being involved with the illegal activities of the social-democratic party, even though Kvali was considered to be a legal newspaper. During his imprisonment Zhordania started to read other literature, like Shakespeare and Hugo. In 1902, Zhordania strongly condemned the merge between the Georgian Social-Democratic organization and the Russian Social-Democratic Party.

In June 1902 Zhordania was released from prison and moved to Lanchkhuti before the final verdict from the St. Peterburg police. At this time in the region there was an active Guria peasant movement, led by the Social Democrats. During the mass arrests Zhordania was taken and put in prison, where he met other 200 Gurians and Noe Khomeriki. Later he was transferred from Kutaisi to Poti, and forced in exile in Ganja, where he lived under police custody. However, he was still illegally involved in the party conferences. He wrote a draft of the party program during a conference held in Tbilisi in 1902. Meanwhile, the St. Petersburg police informed Zhordania that his final verdict was to be exiled to the Vyatka Governorate for 3 years. Zhordania escaped to Batumi, where he hid for 10 days in a secret flat, before fleeing to England with a ferry. The ferry captain did not assist political refugees, so he was told that Zhordania was a military deserter.

After three weeks of travelling, Zhordania first arrived in London, then went to Paris, and finally to Geneva to meet Plekhanov. There he was informed about the Russian Social Democratic Labour Party consortium in Brussels and he was invited with an advisory vote. In Brussels, Zhordania met three delegates from the South Caucasus: Topuridze, Knuniantsi and Zurabovi. Zhordania's program was not selected by the Caucasian Committee: the one that was chosen differed only in national and agrarian issues. Brussels local police banned the congress and the delegates moved to London.

Having been elected as a delegate to the 2nd Congress of the Russian Social Democratic Labour Party (RSDLP) in 1903, he sided with the Menshevik faction and gained significant influence. In 1905, he edited a Tbilisi-based Georgian Menshevik newspaper, the Sotsial-Demokratia known for its fierce attacks on the Bolsheviks. During the Russian Revolution of 1905, he went against the armed uprising and advocated the creation of a legal workers’ party. On the 4th Congress of the RSDLP in 1906, he supported the idea of land municipalization. The same year, he was elected to the First State Duma from the Tiflis Governorate and became a spokesman for the Social-Democratic faction. The 5th Congress of the RSDLP transferred him into the Central Committee where he maintained his post until 1912. Having signed the "Vyborg Manifesto", a protest against the dissolution of the First Duma, in December 1907, he was sentenced to three months of imprisonment. In mid-1912, he edited a Baku-based legal Menshevik newspaper Nashe Slovo. In 1914, he collaborated with Leon Trotsky in the magazine Borba where he published a series of articles on the question of nationality.

=== Social Democrat leader ===
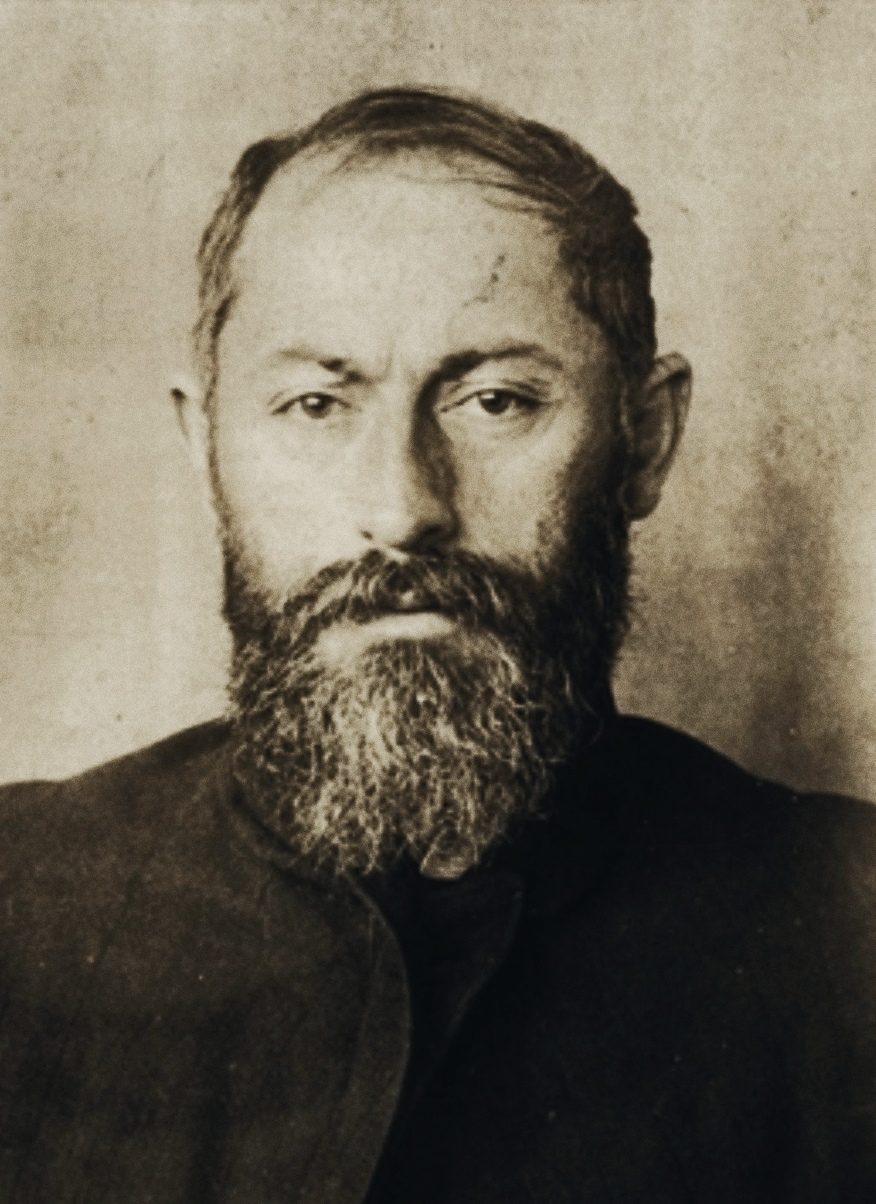
Zhordania in 1903

In 1905, during the revolution, with a false passport and the fake name of "Ignatov", Zhordania arrived in St. Petersburg, where his wife and party comrade Ina Koreneva was waiting for him. From there Zhordania went to Baku, left Ina there and then headed to Tbilisi. In Tbilisi he saw a different political situation from what he had left: the camp of Ilia Chavchavadze was disbanded, the newspaper Iveria was managed by Philipe Gogichaishvili (Georgian: ფილიპე გოგიჩაიშვილი); the Social Democratic party had another newspaper, the Tsnobis Purtseli, and in place of Kvali there was a new magazine, the Traveler, which was Bolshevik oriented. During that time Ina, Zhordania's pregnant wife, was arrested. Thus, Zhordania had to go back to Baku and start negotiation with a famous public figure, Ivane Eliashvili. Eliashvili helped in releasing Ina Koreneva. In April 1905 Ina went to Lanchkhuti, where she gave birth to their first daughter Asmat.

During that time Zhordania unleashed the Georgian Bolsheviks both in Tbilisi and in provinces. The social democratic direction evolved in a way that differed from both from the Russian Bolsheviks and the Mensheviks. They had a clandestine newspaper called "Social Democrat", and a legal one called "Skhivi", both edited by Zhordania, alongside other newspapers: "Lightning" and "Dawn". Meanwhile, Nicholas II of Russia issued an order of activating the State Duma. The Russian Social Democratic Labour Party protested against it. Yet, Zordania tried not let go the opportunity. He participated in the IV unifying congress of the Russian Social Democratic Labour Party in Stockholm in 1906. The congress discussed how to boycott the elections and land issues. The Menshevik party gained favor: Zhordania, however, was elected as a member of congress. He soon discovered that he had also been elected as a member of the State Duma of the Russian Empire. Meanwhile, the Social Democrats won the elections in Georgia. They created the Social Democratic faction in the Duma led by Noe: however, after about a month the State Duma was discharged.

The first State Duma deputy, 1906

After the Duma was dissolved he remained in St. Petersburg, working illegally. In order to create a second State Duma, parties were invited to the conference in Tamerpos. Apart from Lenin, everybody supported the election. With Zhordania's advice, Irakli Tsereteli decided to participate, and he later became the Social Democratic faction leader in the Duma. In 1907, after the murder of Ilia Chavchavadze, Zhordania published article in which he wrote that Marxists nihilists do not look to the past, but, in every historical era they see progress. He compared Ilia to the French chemist Antoine Lavoisier, in that "revolution lead him to death, but no one condemned the revolution".

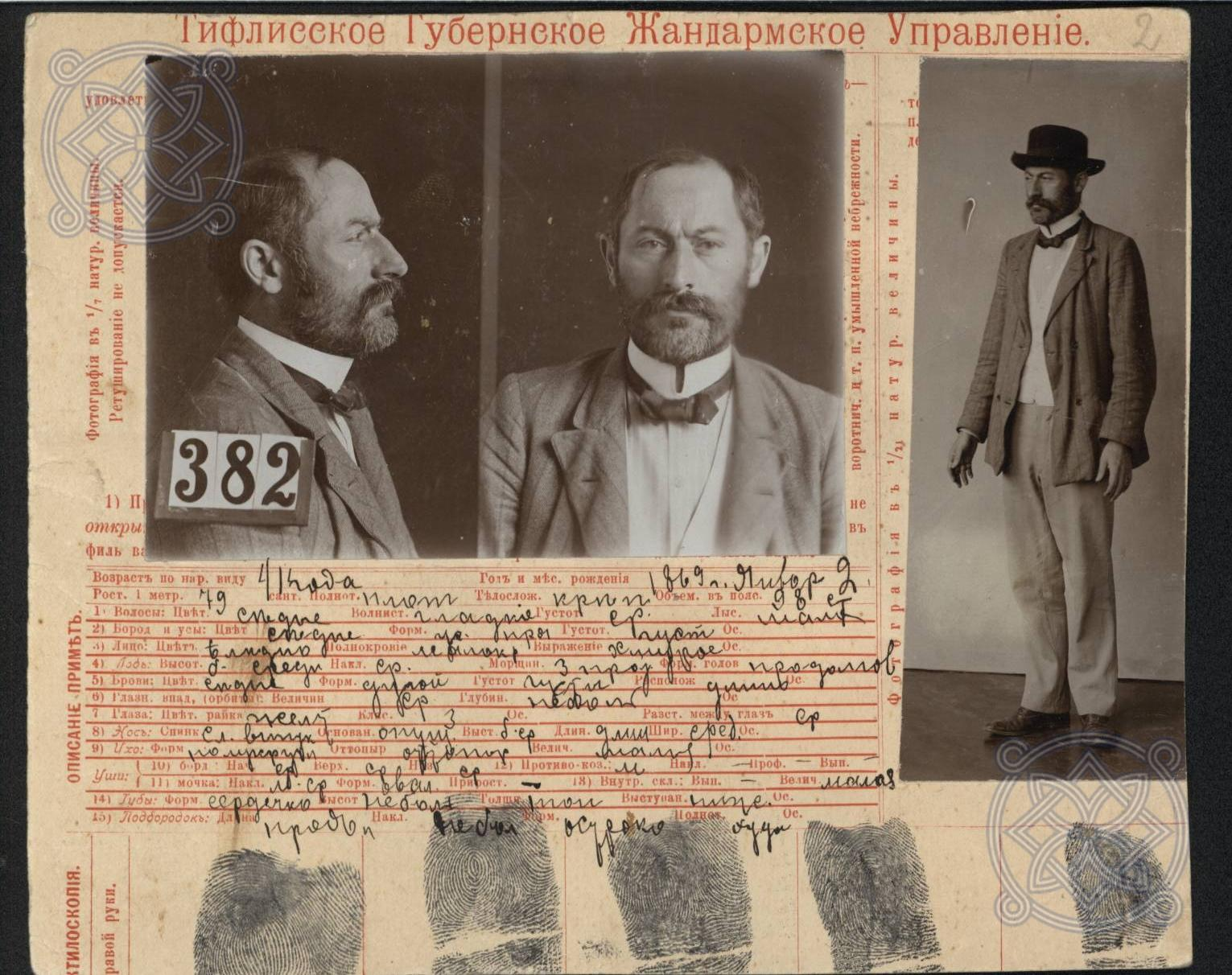
A mugshot of Zhordania made in 1908 by the Tsarist secret police

During the V congress of Russian Social Democratic Labour Party in London in 1907, 29 Georgian delegates were present. At the congress, Lenin asked Zhordania not to interfere in the Russian Bolshevik's activities: in return, he offered them autonomy in domestic matters. Zhordania rejected the proposal. He was elected as a member of the Party Central Committee at the congress. The committee office was located in Finland, so he remained there and went to St. Petersburg only occasionally. When the second State Duma was dismissed, the Social Democrat Leaders, including Irakli Tsereteli, were apprehended and deported to Siberia. In occasion of the elections of the State Duma in December 1907, Zhordania illegally returned to Georgia. He helped Nikolay Chkheidze in defeating another candidate, Luarsab Andronikashvil, in elections. Evgeni Gegechkori became the deputy in Kutaisi. In August 1908, Zhordania was arrested again and sent to St. Petersburg. Accused of using a fake passport, he was sentenced to 6 months of imprisonment. After eight months in jail, he was suddenly released and went to Baku, where his wife and children awaited for him. In Baku, Zhordania became head editor of the Menshevik newspaper "Our Words". At this time David Sarajishvili had entrusted him to draw up his own library catalog, and gave him a cash prize, before sending him and his family to Italy for a cooperative investigation. In 1909, during his stay in Italy, Zhordania attended the Paris meeting of the Russian Social Democratic Labour Party. The session aimed to the expropriate Bolsheviks and divestiture ban, which was, accepted. In Vienna, in the newspaper of Leon Trotsky, "Battle", had published letters about the party unification.

After returning from Italy, Zhordania worked in Tbilisi, Baku and Lanchkhuti, cooperating with the party press. In Lanchkhuti he was caught and charged with a call to political and social disorder. He was sentenced to three years in prison in Kutaisi, but he was able to pay his bail, that was only three thousand rubles. The tsar announced an amnesty in 1913 to mark the three hundred-year rule of the Romanov dynasty: it focused on press crimes and gave Zhordania his freedom. Meanwhile, Ina Koreneva, who led the Social Democrats in the election campaign in Baku, was banned from living in the Caucasus and moved in Moscow with her children.

=== World War I ===
The RSDLP did not work properly in different countries in 1914. The only exception of this rule was in Georgia, where they were relatively more effective. In Baku they were not working as well, while in Kiev the RSDLP did not exist at all. Zhordania went to Europe with the aim of finding an agreement with the members of RSDLP's central committee. The party had already split into two factions, and none of them had any hope of the revolution that was due to come in Russia. Zhordania met Leon Trotsky in Vienna, in June, and published his letters regarding Bolshevik-Menshevik relations and national issues. Following his doctor's advice, he later decided to spend the summer in Montreux, Switzerland, where he staid three weeks. During the second half of July he went to Beatenberg, where he intended to stay until the end of August, and then to visit Zürich, where the Bolsheviks gathered, and Geneva, where the Mensheviks had gathered. In Geneva, he intended to meet Mgeladze Vlasi and the other Social Democrat immigrants.

The First World War started on August 2, changing his plans. Zhordania immediately decided to return to his homeland: the only way was through Istanbul, by the sea. Benito Mussolini, at the time the editor of the Italian Social Democratic Party newspaper "Avanti", helped him to buy the tickets from Venice to Istanbul. Zhordania arrived in Odessa, where he reunited with his wife and children. Zhordania, in the end, did not contribute to this dispute: he settled in Lanchkhuti and began writing letters to be published in various newspapers. He published a letter from "War and Peace", where he stressed his anti-Germanic position.

At the same time, Zhordania secretly met Mikheil Tsereteli, an old acquaintance, who had translated Marx's "Capital" in English and brought it to his editorial office. Tsereteli worked with a German oriented committee, which aimed to liberate Georgia with the help of Germany and the Ottoman Empire. Zhordania supported the idea of independence, but had different views on tactics: he was waiting for the right moment, and did not support the protests against Russia, because he felt that it would lead to repression. They agreed to work on their own, since both ways could produce the same result.

Furthermore, the Social Democratic Party didn't reach consensus on the national issue. It was decided to organize a party conference, which was held in Junjuat. The conference agreed on the declaration of independence only if the Russian army would leave Georgian territory.

=== Revolution and independence ===
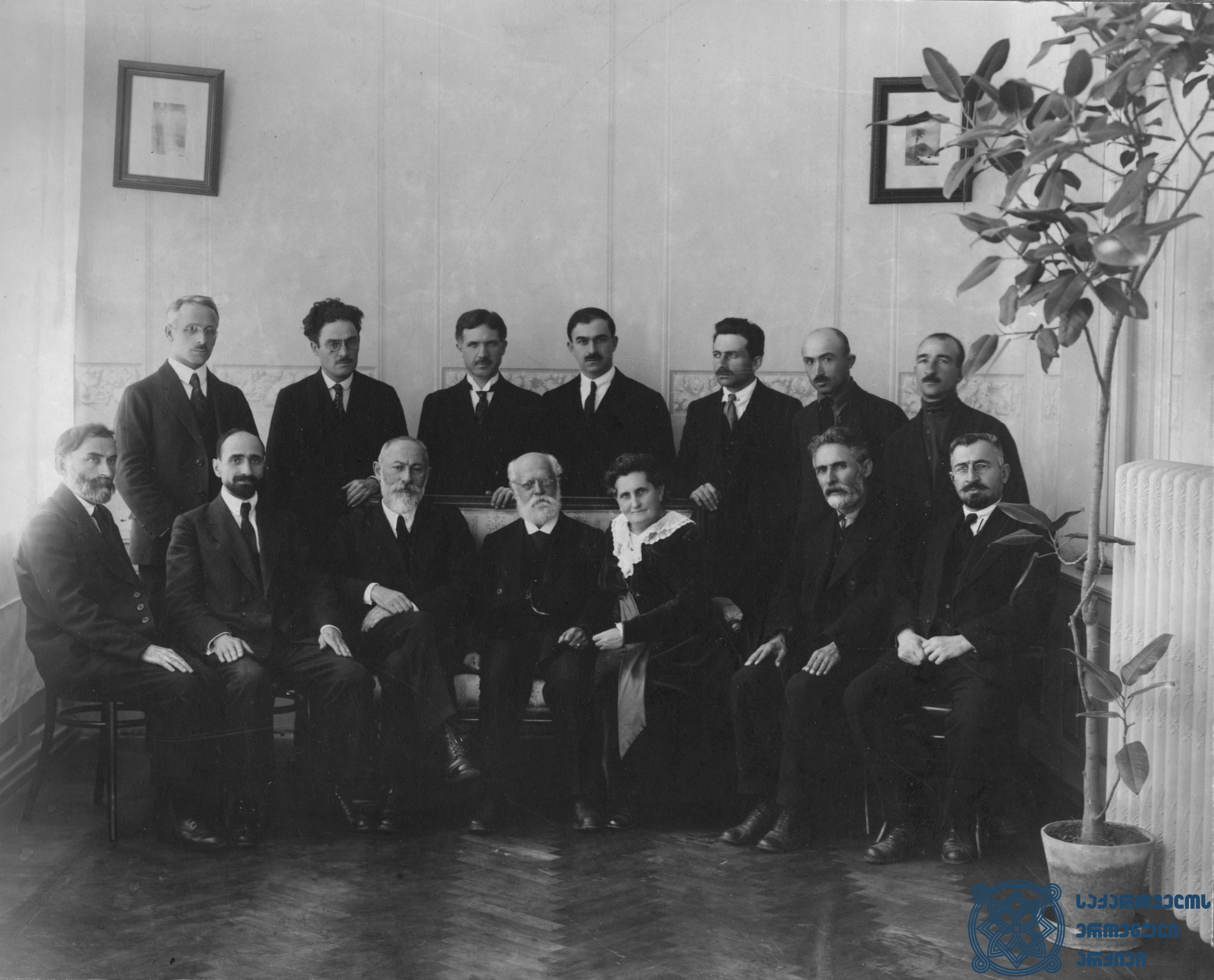
Karl Kautsky with Georgian Social-Democrats, Tbilisi, 1920. Noe Zhordania is seated in the front row, third from left.

During World War I, Zhordania maintained a "defensist" position and worked for Georgi Plekhanov's Journal "Samozaschita" (1916). After the 1917 February Revolution, he chaired the Tbilisi soviet and on March 6, 1917, he was elected as a commissioner of the executive committee of the Tbilisi Soviet. In August 1917, he was elected to the Central Committee of the RSDLP(u[nited]). On the September 3, 1917, he made a speech calling on the workers not to succumb to Bolshevist sentiments, but rather to fight for the establishment of a parliamentary republic. In October 1917, he joined the Russian Pre-Parliament, but soon became disillusioned with it and returned to Georgia. On November 26, 1917, he obtained a chair of the Presidium of the National Council of Georgia and played a leading role in the consolidation of Menshevik power in Georgia. His wavering position on formal secession from Bolshevist Russia ended in May 1918, when he headed a parliamentary session which declared the independent Democratic Republic of Georgia. On July 24, 1918, he became Head of the Government of Georgia.

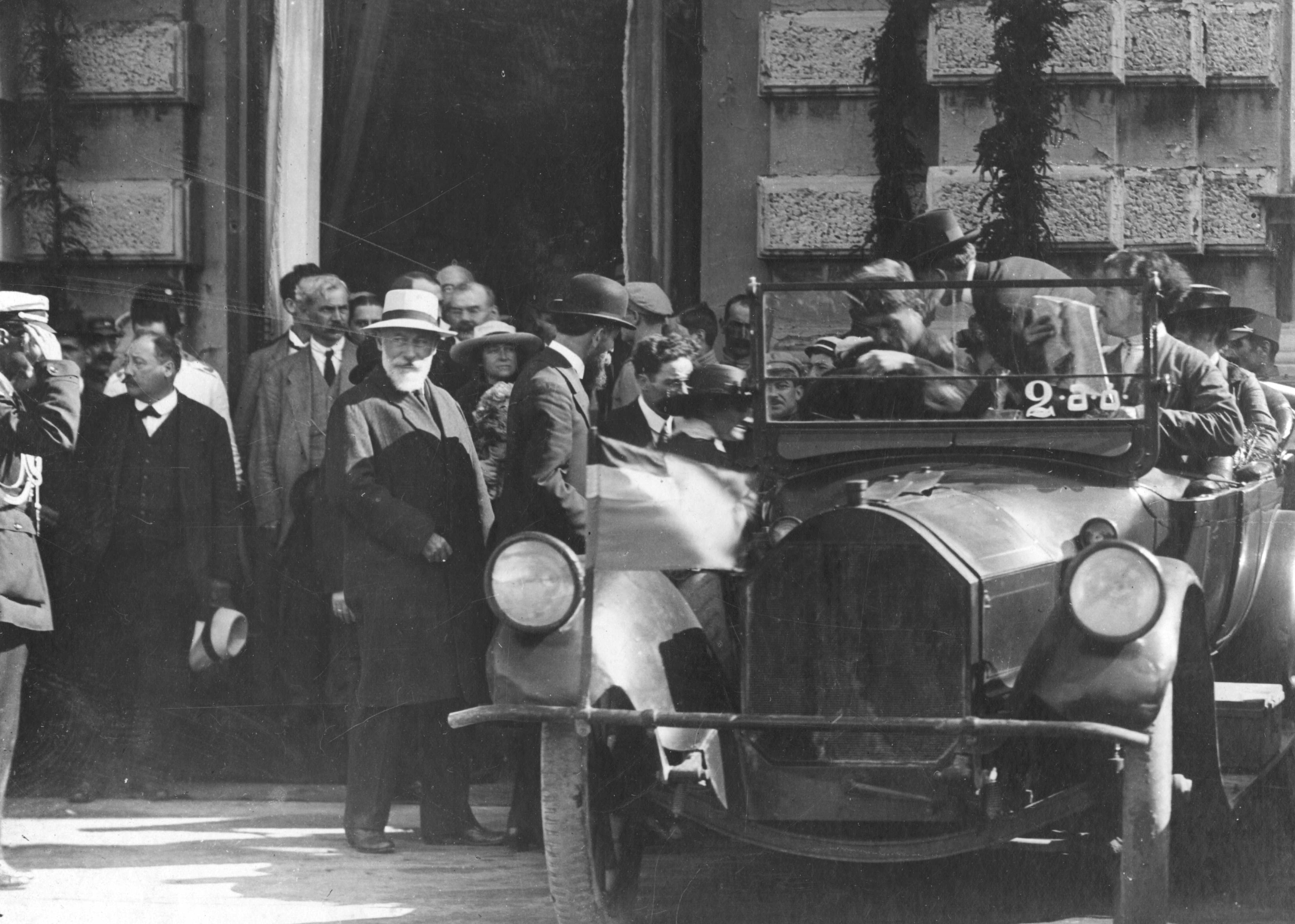
Zhordania with the Second International Delegation. Tbilisi, 1920

In January 1918, Army units situated on the Caucasian Front lines moved towards Tbilisi. The Georgian National Council, commanding a newly created Georgian regular army (the first Georgian Corps) and National Guard units were able to stop the Russian army. The Russians were forced to forego the occupation of Tbilisi and retreated towards Baku. The Transcaucasian Commissariat did not recognize the conditions of the Brest-Litovsk Treaty. In April 1918, the Ottomans occupied the Batumi region, Guria and Samtskhe-Javakheti. On April 9, 1918, Transcaucasian independence was announced: that was one of the requirements of the Ottoman Empire. Zhordania did not support the declaration of independence, as he believed that an independent Caucasus could have easily fallen into the hands of the Ottoman Empire. A South Caucasus delegation left for Batumi to negotiate with their Ottoman colleagues: they met on May 11, 1918. It appeared that all three South Caucasus nations had different foreign policies. Georgia favored assistance from Germany, who required Georgia to become independent.

Zhordania and other officials have been summoned to the parade, 1919

In the morning of May 26, 1918, the Transcaucasian Democratic Federative Republic and so-called "Transcaucasian Seim" (Georgian: ამიერკავკასიის სეიმი) announced their self-dissolution. At 5:10PM Georgia declared its independence. The Independence Act was formed by lawyer Gvazava and had been previously introduced to Zhordania. In addition to the national provisions, there were also included some social issues, like, for example, the eight-hour working day and rules for land confiscation. Zhordania, however, removed the social provisions and left only the national political ones. He read the redacted Independence Act at the National Council, who unanimously approved it. From 24 June, Zhordania replaced Noe Ramishvili to become Prime Minister (chairman of the Government) of the coalition government.

In 1919, there was a proportional system based on the Constituent Assembly elections. The meeting was opened on March 12. Out of 130 deputies, 109 were Social-Democrat. Zhordania was free from autocratic dictatorial aspirations and considered the advice from other parties. The coat of arms of Georgia was adopted after Zhordania's proposal. To avoid clericalism, all religious signs related to St. George were removed. On March 21, 1919, he was elected as a chairman of the Government, who was also one of the two High Representatives of the Republic of Georgia, with chairman of the Constituent Assembly. Under Noe Zhordania's leadership, the new administration established the Tbilisi State Conservatory and the Institute of Caucasian Archaeology and History in 1917. They designated Georgian as the official language of the republic and founded Tbilisi State University, declaring it to be a Georgian language institute of higher education.

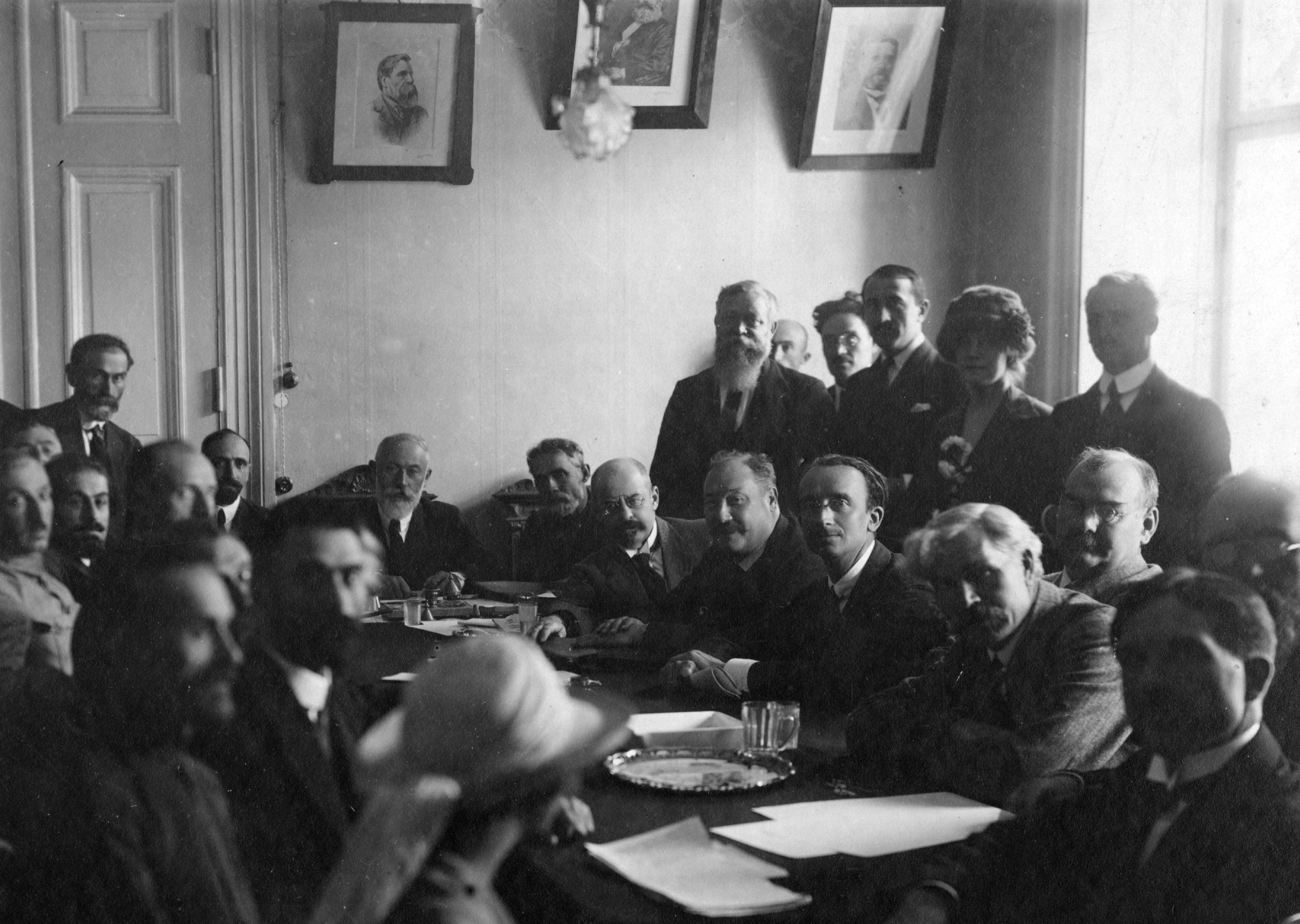
Second International delegation received by Noe Zhordania, 1920.

During 1919–20, Georgia experienced serious troubles. The Bolsheviks consistently organized rebellions. Filipp Makharadze escaped from the Metekhi prison amid rumors that he was assisted by Zhordania himself, as an old friend. The country experienced great economic hardship, lack of food and bread, and hyperinflation. In his memoirs Zhordania noted that because of the hardship it was difficult to convince people to work with the government.

"Once my mother arrived with food from village. Of course, we were glad. My mother asked: You told me you were a minister. Yet, who would believe that I'd still have to support you! "

— Noe Zhordania

He opposed Bolshevik and separatist tendencies, and ethnic minorities were granted political and cultural rights. Zhordania tried to achieve international recognition for Georgia. In 1920, Zhordania sent Grigol Uratadze to Russia to begin negotiations regarding the recognition of Georgia as an independent state. The treaty was signed on May 7, 1920. With this agreement, diplomatic relations between Georgia and Russia were established. A month before signing the contract, the Georgian army repelled the Russian army, which had tried to take Tbilisi from Azerbaijan. In order to prevent possible demoralization, Zhordania ordered the guard to spread the rumor that Azerbaijan had been the aggressor, and not Russia. However, when the Soviet government proposed a joint offensive against the Volunteer Army of Anton Denikin, Zhordania remarked "I prefer the imperialists of the West to the fanatics of the East."

In December 1920, the League of Nations refused to make Georgia and Armenia members, but, after a month, in January 1921, Georgia reached international legal recognition. In February, the Constituent Assembly adopted the Constitution of the Democratic Republic. In three years, his government had organized a successful land reform, adopted comprehensive social and political legislation, and cultivated widespread international ties, enabling Georgia to become the only Transcaucasian nation to earn de jure recognition from Soviet Russia and the Western powers. Apart from massive peasant support, his government managed to gain, through combining socialism, democracy, and a moderate form of nationalism, the loyalty of the intellectual élites and nobility, and played a crucial role in transforming Georgia into a modern political nation. However, the invasion of the Soviet armies in February–March 1921 toppled the Georgian government, forcing Zhordania and many of his colleagues to seek refuge in France, where he led the government-in-exile and continued his efforts to earn international recognition of the Soviet occupation of Georgia and foreign support for Georgian independence until his death in Paris in 1953.

In 1923, Noe Zhordania made an appeal to the United States in which he said:

In the twentieth century, before the eyes of the civilized world, I appeal to the conscience of civilized nations and all honest people to condemn this persecution of a small nation and the Bolsheviks, the criminals inspiring and carrying out these barbarous acts.

— Noe Zhordania

He also said in the appeal that Chekists had killed without trial hundreds of people, including women and children, many of them from the Georgian intellectual class.

=== Emigration and death ===
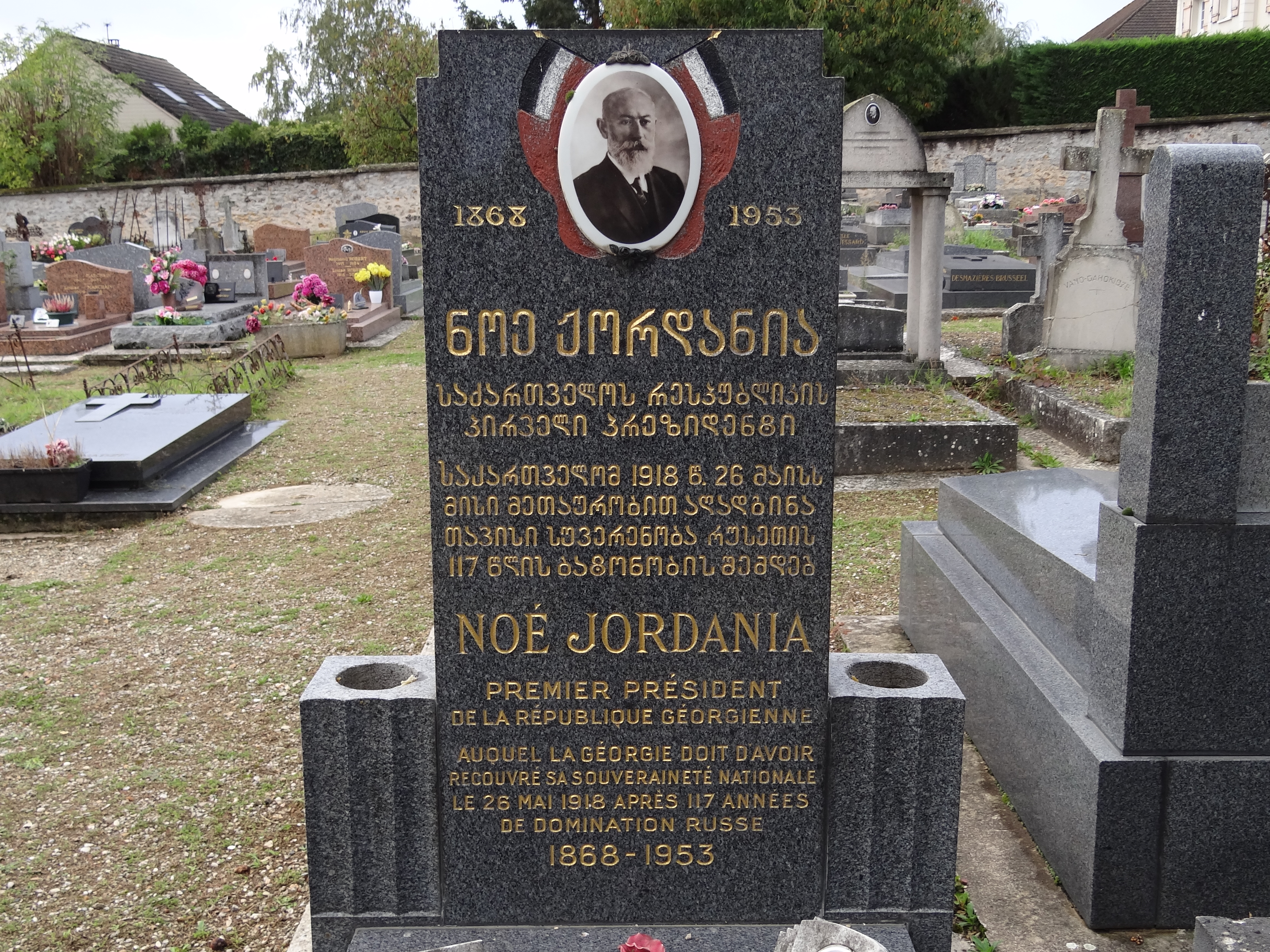
Noe Zhordania's grave

In Istanbul, Zhordania met with the French ambassadors and was invited to settle the Georgian government in exile in France. However, in April 1921, Zhordania was not warmly welcomed in France. He later visited Brussels and London, asking the respective governments for support, but they expressed no interest in the issue. Zhordania gave up and decided to work with the European countries, and to assist his remaining comrades in Georgia.

"The European society is exhausted, they don't empathize with other's pain, they don't even recognize it, and they only care about one thing - To be by themselves, peacefully, with no worries..."

— Noe Zhordania

Zhordania lived first in Paris, and then in Leuville-sur-Orge, where he helped with the preparation of the Georgian revolt in 1924. Shortly after, his mother, and his daughter Asmat, who had not left Georgia in 1921, were arrested and imprisoned in Batumi. Sergo Kavtaradze, a week later, offered to help them flee the country, but his mother refused the proposal.

Zhordania wrote books in which he criticized the Soviet Union as "the revolution under mask of imperialism". In addition to his political treatises, when he was still in Paris, in 1930, he published the Georgian epic poem by Shota Rustaveli, "The Knight in the Panther's Skin".

By 1933 he had published 12 other books, some of which were "Combating Problems" (Georgian: ბრძოლის საკითხები), "We and They" (Georgian: ჩვენ და ისინი), "Soviet System" (Georgian: საბჭოთა წყობილება), "True and False Communism" (Georgian: ნამდვილი და ყალბი კომუნიზმი), "Politics" (Georgian: პოლიტიკა), "Bolshevism" (Georgian: ბოლშევიზმი), "Our Differences" (Georgian: ჩვენი უთანხმოება), and "Democracy" (Georgian: დემოკრატია). In Paris he founded the Georgian Social-Democratic journal "Battle" (Georgian: ბრძოლა) and the newspaper "Battle Cry" (Georgian: ბრძოლის ხმა). Until the 1990s the journal he founded, "Our Flag" (Georgian: ჩვენი დროშა), was active, and later edited by his son-in-law, Levan Paghava.

Noe Zhordania died at the age of 85, on January 11, 1953, in Leuville-sur-Orge, where he is buried. In 1968 his memorial, titled "My Past", was published in English and Russian posthumously. On 10 March 2004, Mikhail Saakashvili offered to move Zhordania's remains to Georgia.

The "Noe Zhordania Institute" in Paris studies his heritage and the history of social democracy in Georgia.

== Ideology ==
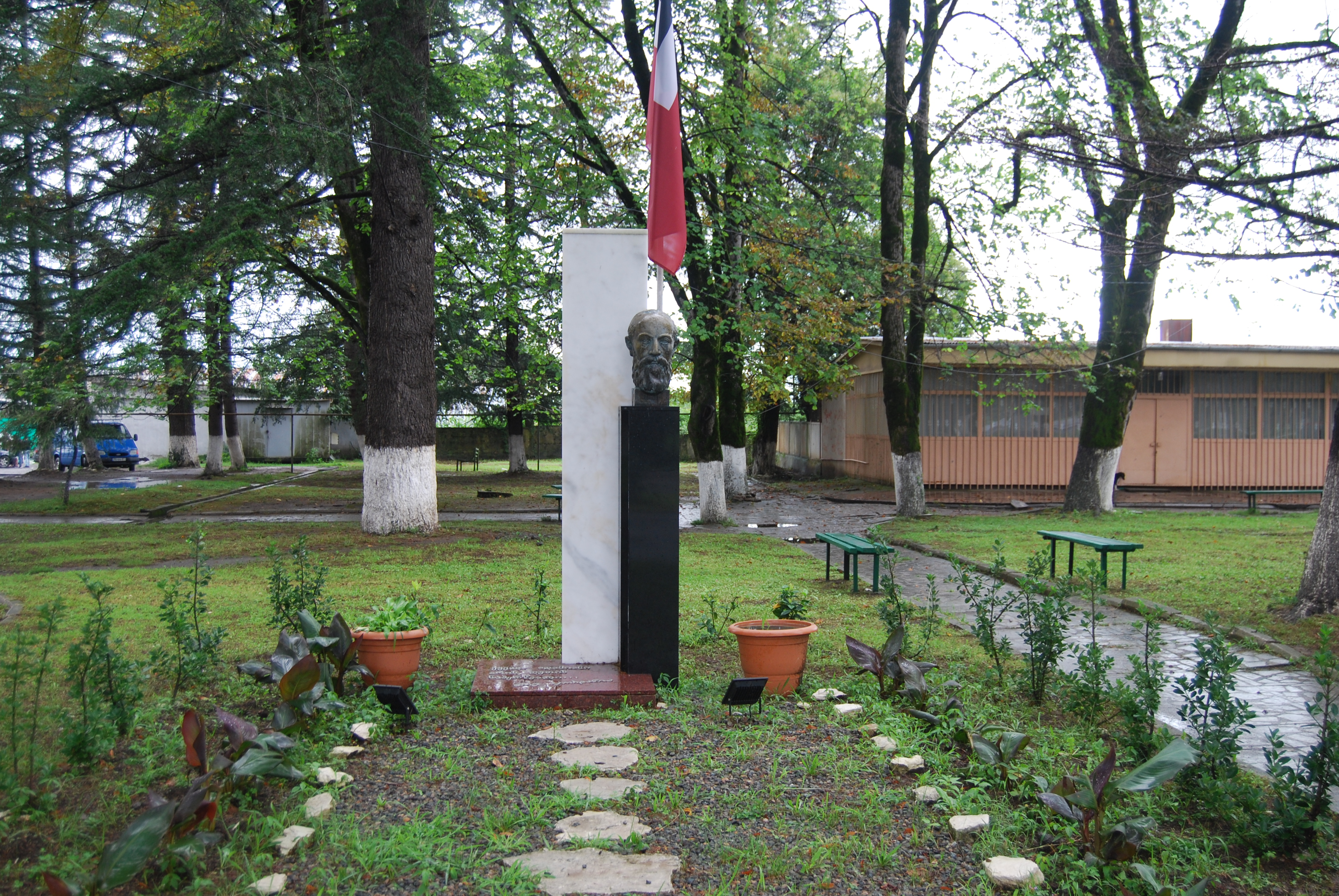
Noe Zhordania Statue and square in Lanchkhuti

Zhordania was a Marxist, leaning towards the social-democratic. He focused on the peasantry and dealt with the national issue. As a child he grew up as an Orthodox Christian. He questioned the existence of God for the first time in school, after reading "The Door to Nature" of Iakob Gogebashvili: because of it, he found out that natural disasters had a scientific explanation. Because of his doubts regarding the existence of God he ended up questioning the legitimacy of the government of the king, since the king's legitimacy was commonly perceived being a divine ordination. Even in school he had a strong belief:

"The king is as fictional an authority as God. This fact made both atheism and republicanism two faces of the same coin."("My past", p. 12)

— Noe Zhordania

During the seminary studies he formed the Group of Narodnik Socialists, that supported the revolution. The Narodniks recognized a revolution that was not Democratic, but Socialist: they demanded the establishment of socialism. They believed that the only choice was between either priesthood or being a Narodnik. In Warsaw, Zhordania was introduced to Marxism and its political ideology: that was after 1892, when the revolutionaries in Russia went from seeking socialism to European Marxism.

In his view, Russian socialism was an utopian and reactionary doctrine, which brought people back to barbarism. Zhordania believed that European socialism was leading the proletariat towards the factories, so the political actions had to be based on that type of proletariat. In addition, he shared the view that the backward countries needed political revolution, democracy, economic development and later the transition to socialism.

He had different views on war tactics in respect to the Russian Marxists. In "Kvali" and "Skhivi", he thought it was fair to use terror under certain circumstances. Zhordania had conservative views regarding the role of families and believed that a person's main objective was to have family and procreate.

=== The agrarian issue ===
To better understand the ideology of Marxism, he traveled to Switzerland, France, Germany and England, where he became part of several European socialist parties. What he discovered was that the structure of the European society was considerably different from the Georgian one.

He was foremost interested in agrarian issues. In Europe, the peasant was considered a private owner, and the petty bourgeoisie was subjected to state taxes, unlike the aristocracy. In Georgia it was the opposite: because of that, the peasants and the landlords monarchists were opposed. The agrarian question was, for Zhordania, a central issue. In contrast to the European and Russian Social Democratic Movements, which sought political change through the industrial proletariat, Zhordania believed that farmers were the leading force in the revolutionary movement.

"The social structure in Europe was too far away from that of Georgia. It posed the risk of influencing and changing Georgian revolutionary ideology " ("My past", p. 28)

— Noe Zhordania

=== National issue ===
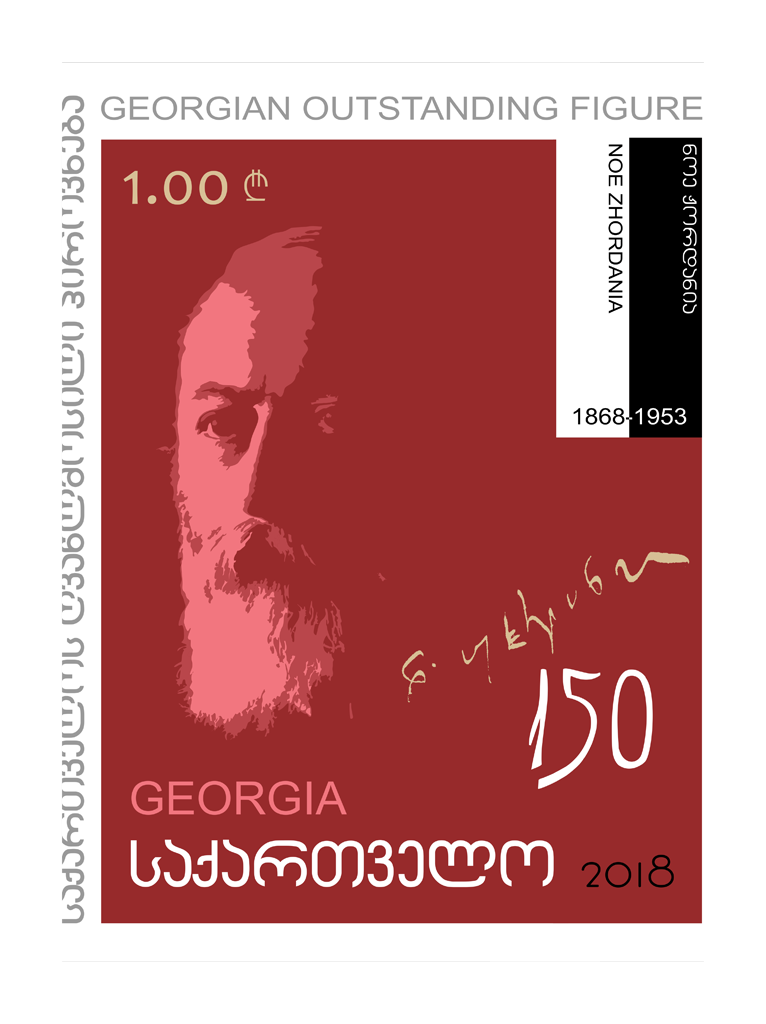
Noe Zhordania on a 2018 stamp of Georgia

Unlike Georgia, Western European countries had a settled national identity already, so Zhordania could not find anything useful from their programs: it was in Poland that he was introduced to the idea of a nationalist movement. At the beginning of 1896, in a letter to Karl Kautsky regarding Polish autonomy, Zhordania's viewpoint came to life. He thought that Marxism does not deny the national issue and the national struggle for freedom.

"If a person wants to be free, why the nation, as a large ethnic community, has not to be driven by itself, does not have its own state?"

— Noe Zhordania

He did not believe that the promotion of the national issue came first. Subsequently, he opposed the Social-federalist movement. According to him Georgia was a young nation, whose national consciousness was only born at the end of the 19th century. In his view, Russia had brought in Georgia a higher political-economic system, namely capitalism. In addition to that, he felt that, since the local peasants were against landlords, by putting the national issue in front he would lose the support from the peasantry, and by losing them the revolutionary movement would be endangered. He supported only the cultural autonomy of nations.

During World War I he was particularly opposed to the national issue. He considered it a physical threat to the nation. He thought that the country should show commitment to Russia, otherwise the whole government would be under threat. This idea was strengthened during Russia's punitive expedition in Adjara. In Zhordania's view, the party should not bear the responsibility for separatism. While the Social-Democratic Party did not have common understanding on the national issues, Zhordania personally did not question Georgia's independence: his vision was based only on tactical considerations. After the October Revolution, Zhordania's view changed in regards to the nationalist stance.

== Family ==
In 1904, Noe Zhordania married Ina Koreneva, a party comrade (1877–1967). The couple had four children: Asmat, Nina, Redjeb, and Andreika. The daughter of Asmat Zhordania and Levan Pagava, fr:Ethéry Pagava, would become a famous ballerina in France. Nina married Archil Tsitsishvili and had three daughters and five grandchildren. Andreika died in Georgia on 4 April 1919 from meningitis at age 12, while Redjeb Zhordania (1921–2021) had one son and two daughters, and lived in New York, where he was a lecturer on French civilization.

Zhordania's relative, Nina Gegechkori, was Lavrenti Beria's wife.

== Works ==
- Zhordania, Noe (1968), My Life, Stanford, California: The Hoover Institution on War, Revolution and Peace, ISBN 0-8179-4031-6

== Bibliography ==
- Mikaberidze, Alexander (2007), Mikaberidze, Alexander (ed.), "Zhordania, Noe", Dictionary of Georgian National Biography
- Figes, Orlando (2014), A People's Tragedy: The Russian Revolution 1891–1924, London: The Bodley Head, ISBN 978-1-847-92291-5
- Jones, Stephen F. (2005), Socialism in Georgian Colors: The European Road to Social Democracy 1883–1917, Cambridge, Massachusetts: Harvard University Press, ISBN 978-0-67-401902-7
- Rayfield, Donald (2012), Edge of Empires: A History of Georgia, London: Reaktion Books, ISBN 978-1-78023-030-6
- Rieber, Alfred J. (2015), Stalin and the Struggle for Supremacy in Eurasia, Cambridge, Cambridgeshire: Cambridge University Press, ISBN 978-1-107-42644-3
- Suny, Ronald Grigor (1994), The Making of the Georgian Nation (Second ed.), Bloomington, Indiana: Indiana University Press, ISBN 978-0-25-320915-3
- Zhordaniya, Noy (1968), Моя Жизнь (My Life) (in Russian), translated by Zhordaniya, Inny, Stanford, California: The Hoover Institution on War, Revolution and Peace, Stanford University, ISBN 978-0-81-794031-7

Preceded by Noe Ramishvili	Head of the Government of Georgia; 1918–1921	Succeeded by Soviet rule
Preceded by None	Head of the Government of Georgia in Exile; 1921–1953	Succeeded by Evgeni Gegechkori
