= Tbilisi Theological Seminary =

Educational institution in Tbilisi, Georgia

Coordinates: 41.6911°N 44.8068°E

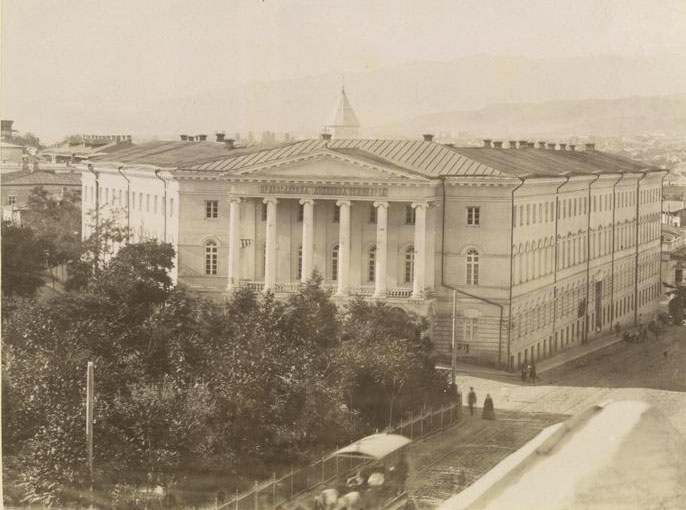
The Russian Orthodox Theological Seminary from the side of the Soldier's Bazaar, 1870s

Tbilisi Theological Academy and Seminary (Georgian: თბილისის სასულიერო სემინარია, romanized: tbilisis sasuliero seminaria; Russian: Тбили́сская духо́вная семина́рия, romanized: Tbilisskaya dukhovnaya seminariya) is a seminary in Tbilisi, Georgia. It operated from 1817 to 1919 under the name Tiflis Theological Seminary in the Georgian exarchate of the Russian Orthodox Church. The facility closed during the wake of the Russian Revolution and the subsequent 1921 invasion of Georgia. The building housing the seminary closed in 1917, and one of the major buildings the seminary used was eventually repurposed in 1950 to become the Art Museum of Georgia.

After Georgian independence in 1991 and the concurrent fall of communism and its discouragement of religion, there was interest in creating a successor. The institution reopened on new premises in 1993 as a higher educational institution of the Georgian Orthodox Church.

The institution's most famous attendee was Ioseb Besarionis dze Jughashvili, better known by his Russianized name of Joseph Stalin. Stalin received a scholarship and attended when he was age fourteen in 1894. The language of instruction was Russian, and use of the Georgian language was discouraged by the Russian priests who taught there. Stalin was a voracious reader in both languages. He became a cultural nationalist for Georgia. He participated in student politics and anonymously published poetry in Georgian in the local newspaper. Although his academic performance was good, he was expelled in 1899 after missing his final exams. While at the seminary, Stalin met a circle of friends who would go on to be influential in later Marxist politics, including joining the Mesame Dasi party. Another notable graduate was the poet Galaktion Tabidze.

== History ==
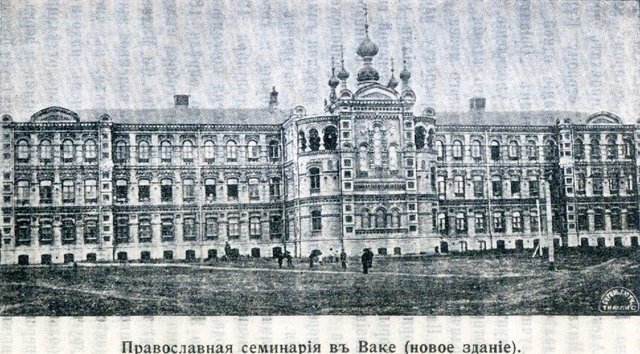
The seminary building used from 1912 to 1917 in the Vake neighborhood of Tiflis

Tiflis Theological Seminary opened in 1817. In 1838, the Swiss architects brothers Giovanni and Giuseppe Bernardazzi built a new building for the seminary opposite Paskevich-Erivansky Square (modern Freedom Square, Tbilisi). In 1872, as part of a Pan-Slavism initiative under the leadership of Grand Duke Michael Nikolaevich, a ban was introduced on the use of the Georgian language for teaching in seminaries, as the seminary was seen as a hotbed of Georgian nationalism. All instruction was to take place in Russian instead. In 1903, construction began on a new complex of buildings in the Vake neighborhood of Tiflis, headed by architect Alexander Rogoisky. The seminary moved in 1912, and the old building became a hotel. It did not last long, though; in the chaos of the Russian Revolution, the buildings were requisitioned in 1917. The seminary may have operated on a temporary basis for a time, but it too eventually closed in the following years. One of old buildings in the complex used by the seminary was repurposed to house the Art Museum of Georgia in 1950, the location it still occupies.

The two main courses of instruction were Orthodox theology and rhetoric. Various related topics were also taught, including Church Slavonic, history, mathematics, literature, French, and German.

== See also ==
- Nersisian School, another Orthodox school of education in Tiflis, but centered on the Armenian community

== Bibliography ==
- Jones, Stephen F. (2005), Socialism in Georgian Colors: The European Road to Social Democracy 1883–1917, Cambridge, Massachusetts: Harvard University Press, ISBN 978-0-67-401902-7
- Kotkin, Stephen (2014), Stalin, Volume I: Paradoxes of Power, 1878–1928, New York City: Penguin Press, ISBN 978-1-59420-379-4
