= Egnate Ninoshvili =

Georgian writer and activist (1859–1894)

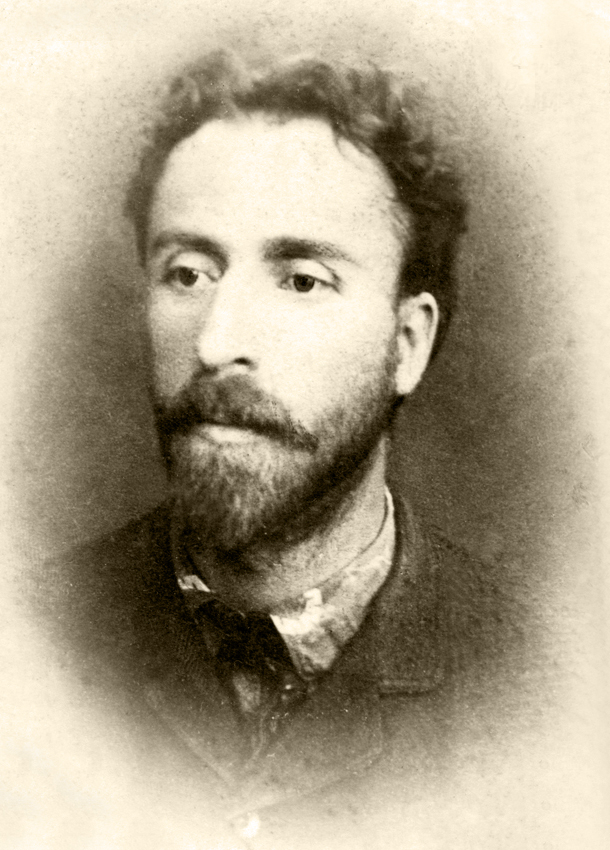
Egnate in c. 1888 photo by Alexander Roinashvili

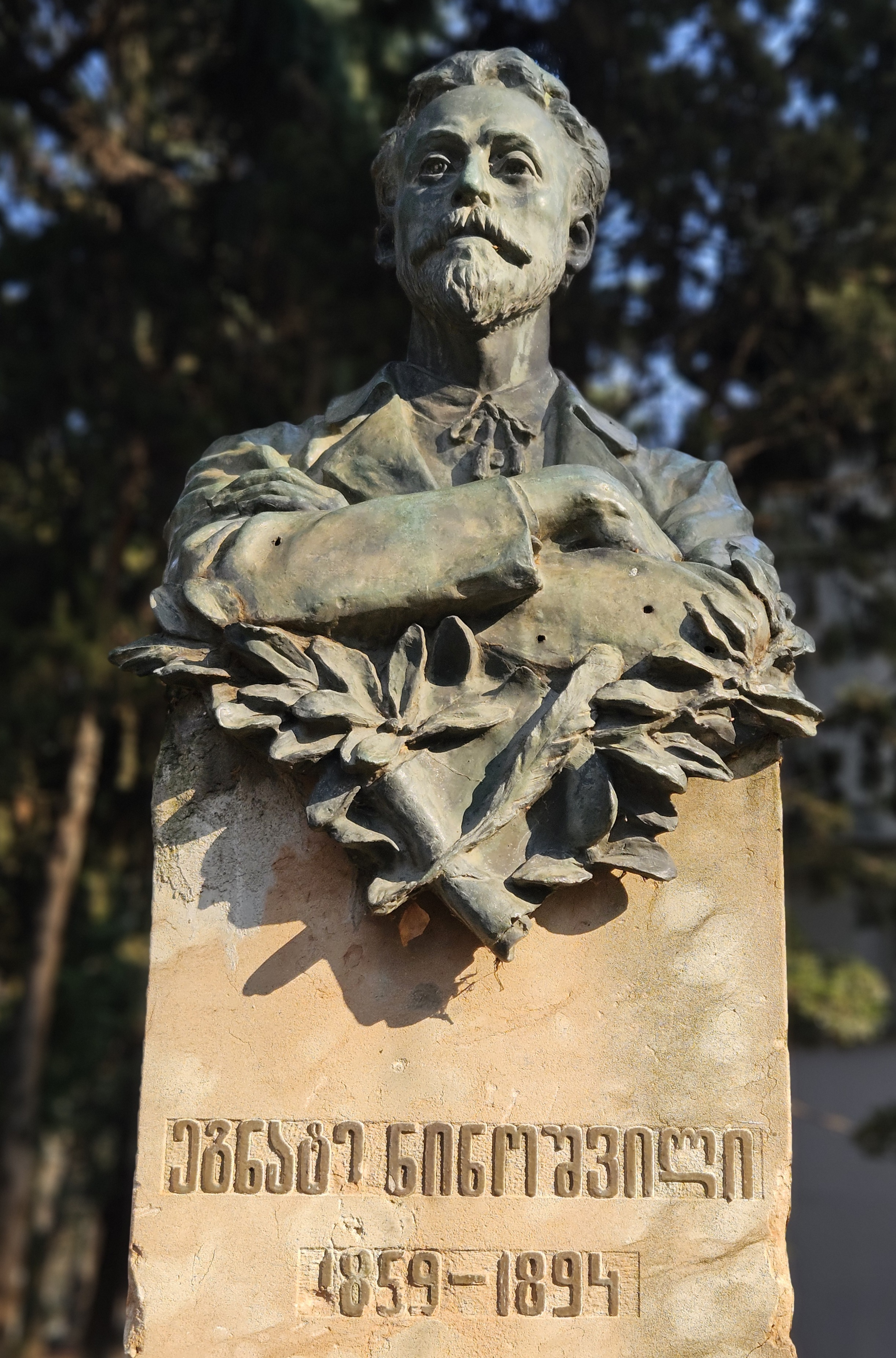
Sculpture to Ninoshvili on Rustaveli Avenue

Egnate Tomas dze Ninoshvili (Georgian: ეგნატე ნინოშვილი; 17 February 1859 – 12 May 1894) was a Georgian writer and social democratic activist.

== Early life and education ==
Ninoshvili was born in a poor peasant family in Kela village, Guria region in western Georgia. He studied at the Ozurgeti seminary but was expelled following a student protest. He then worked as a school teacher, telegraphist, typesetter, in a refinery and in a mine. For a brief period he studied in Montpellier, France.

== Professional activities ==
His literary career started in 1887, with publications in Iveria, a literary and political newspaper. His short stories and novels, relating the hard life of Georgian peasants and their oppression by tsarist officials, include Gogia Uishvili (1890), Lake Paliastomi (1891), Simona (1892) and Kristine (1893).

In 1892, Ninoshvili was one of the founders of Mesame Dasi ("Third Generation"), a Marxist organisation based in Tbilisi that no other than Joseph Stalin joined in 1898. It was through his involvement with Mesame Dasi that Stalin was first introduced to the ideas of Karl Marx. However, the group was too moderate for Stalin's taste and he became discontented with the viewpoints of the majority. Because of Stalin's sympathies toward Bolsheviks, he found himself constantly at odds with the others in the group.

== Death and legacy ==
Ninoshvili died of tuberculosis in 1894, aged 35. His historical novel The Guria Uprising, about the 1841 peasant rebellion in Guria, was published posthumously in 1902. The first Georgian feature film, Kristine (1916-1918) was based on his short story of the same name. In 1948, a house that he had lived in at Archeuli village, Guria was converted into a museum.
