= Razhden Arsenidze =

Georgian jurist, journalist, and politician

Razhden Arsenidze (Georgian: რაჟდენ არსენიძე; 1 October 1880 – 24 May 1965) was a Georgian jurist, journalist, and politician.

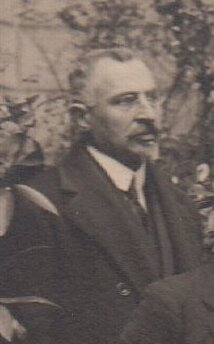
Razhden Arsenidze

He was involved with the Georgian Social Democratic Labour Party, branch of Russian Social Democratic Labour Party and sided with its Menshevik wing in 1903. He later engaged in revolutionary journalism and was exiled by the Imperial Russian administration to Siberia whence he was able to return only after the 1917 February Revolution toppled down the Tsar’s government.

Arsenidze was one of the authors of the 26 May 1918 Act of Independence of Georgia and was elected to the Constituent Assembly of Georgia in 1919. The same year, he became a Minister of Justice in the cabinet of Noe Zhordania, and held this post until being briefly succeeded by Evgeni Gegechkori in 1921. At the same time, he functioned as a secretary of the Central Committee of Georgian Social Democratic Labour Party.

The Red Army invasion of Georgia of 1921 forced him into exile to France where he published his memoirs about Joseph Stalin (frequently cited in the works of a prominent U.S. Sovietologist Robert C. Tucker) and produced a study of the 18th-century Georgian code of King Vakhtang VI (both works published in Paris, 1963).

Arsenidze died in Paris and was buried at the Leuville Cemetery.

== Works ==
- Арсенидзе Р. Из воспоминаний о Сталине //Новый журнал. 1963.

== Sources ==
- Lang, David Marshall (1962), A Modern History of Georgia, p. 162. London: Weidenfeld and Nicolson.
- Stephen F. Jones (2005), Socialism in Georgian Colors: The European Road to Social Democracy, 1883-1917, pp. 119–120, 157, 178. Harvard University Press, ISBN 0-674-01902-4.
- The history of the Ministry of Justice of Georgia. Ministry of Justice of Georgia. Accessed on November 20, 2007.

| Preceded by Shalva Aleksi-Meskhishvili | Minister of Justice of Georgia; 1919-1921 | Succeeded by Evgeni Gegechkori |
