= Zakaria Chichinadze =

Georgian literary critic

Zakaria Chichinadze

Zakaria Chichinadze (Georgian: ზაქარია ჭიჭინაძე; 1854 – 27 December 1931) was a self-educated Georgian literary critic, bibliophile, historian, and a book publisher.

== Early years ==
Zakaria Chichinadze was born in Tiflis (Tbilisi), then part of the Russian Empire, as the fifteenth child in the family of Egnate Chichinadze. He received his primary education in Tbilisi, first at the Mtatsminda school, and then at the Irakli school. He was expelled twice due to his poor performance in mathematics. His parents wanted their son to graduate from school and made attempts to send him to other educational institutions, but he, having lost interest in studying, finally abandoned school and began educating himself.

He started working at the age of 13, working in a tobacco factory and a hotel and then in a book depository, where he became addicted to reading. He later had a job in the censorship office, where he was able to read forbidden literature.

An avid history reader, in 1869 he had a chance encounter with the famous Georgian poet, publisher and public figure Sergey Meskhi, who invited Chichinadze to become an employee of the newspaper Droeba. The newspaper began printing his letters and articles on the history of Georgian literature, written under the pseudonym "Mtatsmindeli", in 1872.

Between 1875 and 1878, Chichinadze collected more than 500 ancient manuscripts and parchments and published them with commentaries. He created numerous monographic works depicting the life and work of Georgian figures which are still of great help to researchers today. He also wrote extensively on the history and culture of Georgia, authoring more than 120 essays and letters on issues of political, social, economic and cultural history of Georgia and publishing many historical, bibliographic, ethnographic, scientific-popular and other books, while helping propagate Georgian literature among the Muslim Georgians of Adjara and Samtskhe.

Chichinadze not only wrote extensively, but typeset, printed, bound and sold his works, as well as the works of others, including Brose-Chubinashvili's edition of "Life of Kartli" (1913, in two parts). He opened his own bookstore, sold books in the bazaar from a stall, traveled frequently to different regions of Georgia and sold and distributed Georgian literature in every possible way,

He was a socialist sympathizer and his bookshop in Tiflis was frequented by revolutionary-minded youngsters such as young Joseph Stalin. He published biographies of Robert Owen, Charles Fourier, Pierre Proudhon, Ferdinand Lassalle, and Louis Blanc and wrote an obituary for Karl Marx. He distributed illegal socialist literature, led a workers' circle, and published materials about the actual state of serfdom in Georgia.

In February 1922, the 50th anniversary of his work was celebrated. "Communist" newspaper wrote on February 19, 1922: "He is a living chronicle of our writing and anyone who wants to understand the history of the development of our thought cannot go beyond Zakaria."

Chichinadze's pen-name Mtatsmindeli means "of the Holy Mountain", referring to a mountain in Tbilisi, where he is now buried, at the Pantheon of Writers and Public Figures. A street in Tbilisi is named after Chichinadze.
