= Luise Kautsky =

German politician (1864–1944)

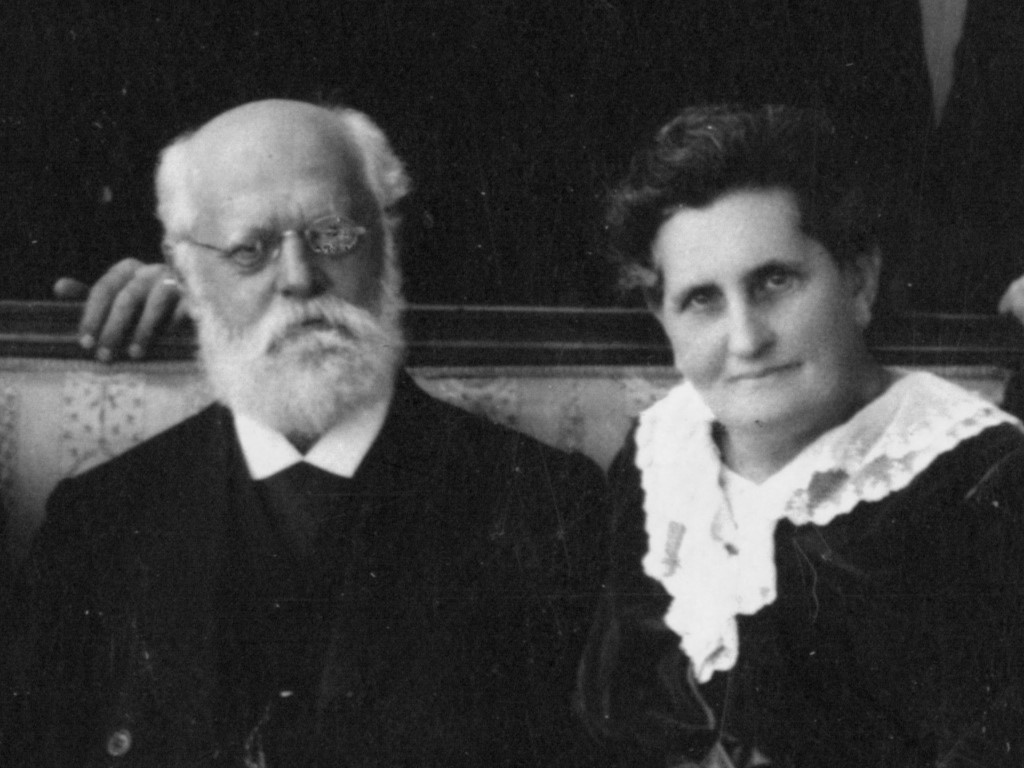
Luise Kautsky with her husband, 1920.

Luise Kautsky (née Ronsperger, 11 August 1864 – 8 December 1944) was a German politician and member of the Independent Social Democratic Party of Germany (USPD).

== Life and career ==
Kautsky was a socialist and active social democrat. She married the prominent Marxist theorist Karl Kautsky. She was also a friend of Rosa Luxemburg and Berlin city councilor for the USPD.

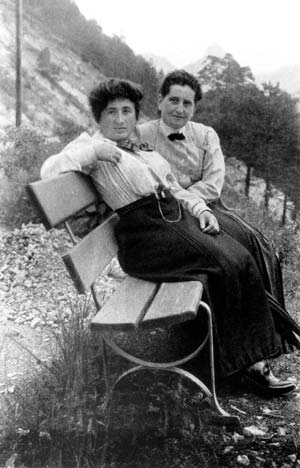
Luise Kautsky with Rosa Luxemburg, 1909

In 1938, because she was Jewish, she had to flee to Prague and then the Netherlands. The Dutch Labour Party was preparing to help her emigrate to England but she refused, fearing she would lose contact with her son Benedikt who was imprisoned in the Buchenwald concentration camp. In 1944, she was deported from Westerbork to Auschwitz, where she died "from heart failure" shortly before the camp was liberated by the Red Army.

The S-bahn arch between Kantstraße and Fasanenstraße in Charlottenburg-Wilmersdorf is named after her. In 1999, Charlottenburg district council resolved to erect a plaque in her memory at Wielandstraße 26.
