= Mesame Dasi =

Third Group მესამე დასი
- Founders: Egnate Ninoshvili and Mikhail Tskhakaya
- Founded: 1892
- Dissolved: September 1924
- Preceded by: Second Group
- Newspaper: Kvali
- Ideology: Social democracy Marxism
- Political position: Centre-left to left-wing
- National affiliation: Social Democratic Party of Georgia (until 1893); Russian Social Democratic Labour Party (since August 1903)

Mesame Dasi (Georgian: მესამე დასი) was the first social-democratic party in the Caucasus, based in Tbilisi, Georgia. It was founded in 1892 by Egnate Ninoshvili and M. G. Tskhakaya as a literary-political group, and became affiliated with the international socialist-Marxist movement in 1893. The name, meaning "third group," was coined by Giorgi Tsereteli during his speech at the funeral for Ninoshvili and it was printed in the newspaper Kvali.

== History ==
=== Early years ===
The Georgian Social Democrats were the ones who took over the name Mesame Dasi (Third Group) in 1893, in order to differentiate themselves from the other two groups, the Pirveli Dasi (First Group) and the Meore Dasi (Second Group). These were two other groups of intellectuals that had been active in the earlier two decades. The Mesame Dasi began their activities by disseminating Marxist propaganda to the workers at various oil refineries and oil fields, along with the railway workers working on the Transcaucasian railway. All of their disseminations were done legally, through various legal channels.

They, in doing so, found two men, Afanas'ev and Stanislaw Reniger, also distributing revolutionary works to the workers. With the joining of these two, the Mesame Dasi created reading and study circles in which they taught the workers. They even translated the Russian texts into Georgian for those who could read that. Much like the other propaganda circles that were being done in Russia, the Mesame Dasi put their own spin on their teachings, from Russian history to biology. In order to keep away from legal trouble, the Dasi kept away from discussing the movement and did not attend any of the sporadic strikes among the workers.

=== Stalin's involvement ===
Joseph Stalin joined the Mesame Dasi in 1898 when he was 20, while he was attending the Tiflis Theological Seminary. Through the Mesame Dasi, he was first introduced to the ideas of Karl Marx. He was in charge of one of the study circles, but became discontented with the viewpoints of the majority. Because of Stalin's sympathies toward Bolsheviks and the irritating manner in which he presided, he found himself constantly at odds with the others in the group. Stalin began to form an opposition group in response to this composed of Lado Ketskhoveli, Alexander Tsulukidze, and himself, which was firmly in the minority. This group, as stated by Lavrentiy Beria, was the beginning of the Leninist Bolshevik organization that would be created in 1904. In working against the majority, the group was finally able, in 1900, to move the entire organization more into propaganda and acts of mass agitation. But the actions of Stalin and his minority continued to irk the leaders of the Mesame Dasi. Finally, in December 1901, they expelled him from the group.

However, Stalin's minority group would have a lasting effect on some of the leaders. Mikha Tskhakaya, one of the founders of the Mesame Dasi, would end up becoming Georgia's first Bolshevik and support Vladimir Lenin's ideology, along with defending Stalin in his later activities.

=== Strengthening nationalism ===
As time went by, the activists among the group, those who participated in the Dasi's illegal activities, began to want to do more. By 1901, the nationalist movement had spread across Georgia, becoming more violent in nature. The old intellectuals of the Dasi continued to oppose the actions of the activists, but their words accomplished nothing. The core of the group began to be made up of workers instead of intellectuals, pushing the group and Georgia further down a socialist path.

In 1902, a massive strike began in a plant in Batumi. Almost four hundred workers were dismissed from the plant and arrests occurred afterwards. When the workers began to march against the police, they fired into the crowd, killing fourteen workers in the process. The Dasi quickly created a Batumi committee, made up of two intellectuals and three workers. In the end, nearly six hundred workers were made to leave the city and many then returned to their farms and villages in Guria. It was this process that created even more revolution, as the workers met up with other social revolutionaries in Guria and created boycotts against the landlords late in the spring. Because the protests continued to spread, the Mesame Dasi were forced to lend their support to the workers. The original meaning of the boycotts had been about the poor harvest in 1901. But when the military and the police intervened, working for the case of the landlords, the boycotts became large political protests against Russian supremacy in Georgia and even against autocracy itself.

=== Later years ===
By 1920, the Mesame Dasi had begun pushing out the older generations of national patriots, the first two groups. They began redirecting Georgian hostility toward the dominant local group, the Armenians for the Georgians, instead of the Russians as had been done before.
