= Noe Ramishvili =

Georgian politician; President of the Democratic Republic of Georgia (1881–1930)

- ნოე რამიშვილი
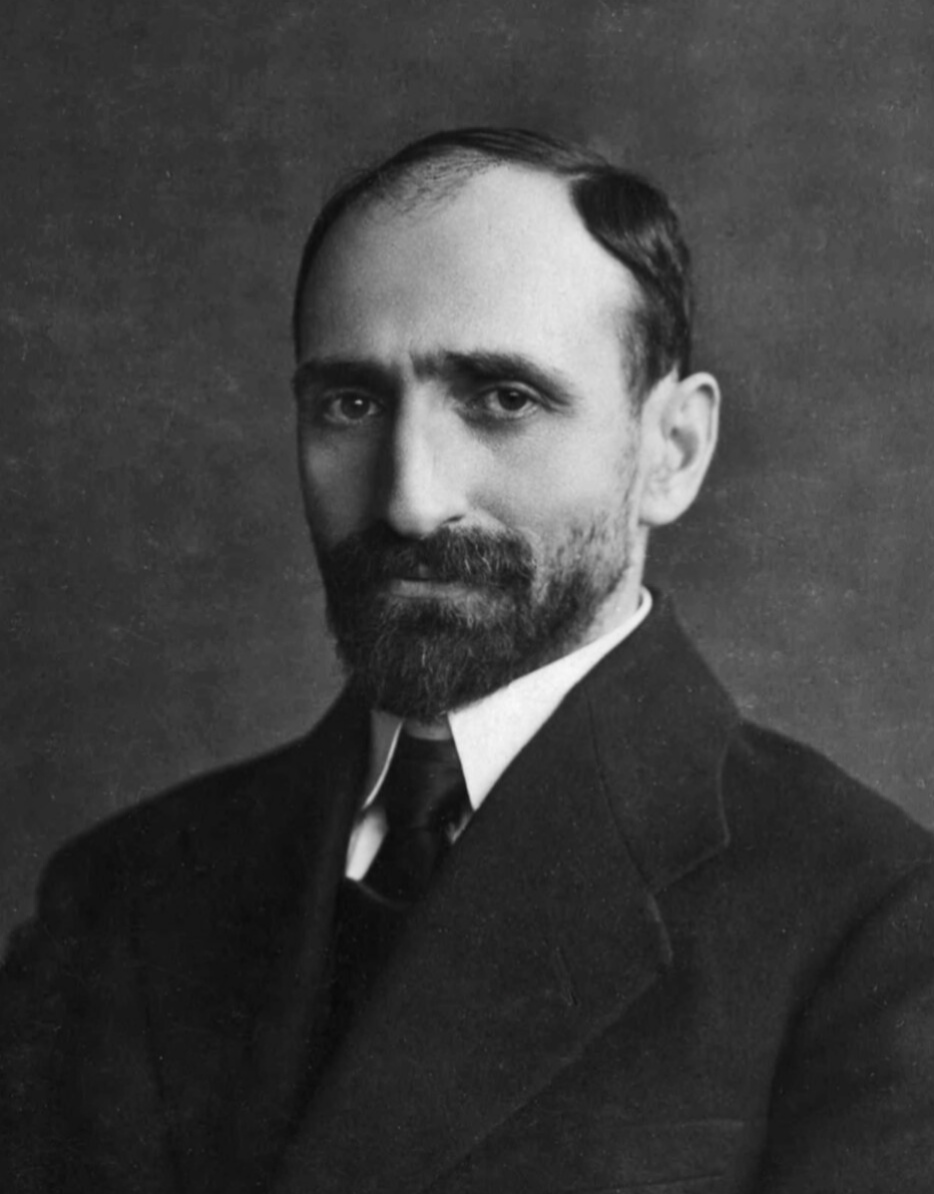
- Ramishvili in 1919

1st Prime Minister of Georgia
- In office 26 May 1918 – 24 June 1918
- President: Nikolay Chkheidze (President of Parliament)
- Preceded by: Position Established
- Succeeded by: Noe Zhordania

Minister of Internal Affairs of the Democratic Republic of Georgia
- In office 26 May 1918 – 17 March 1921
- Preceded by: Position Established
- Succeeded by: Position Abolished

Minister of Defense of Georgia
- In office 14 February 1919 – December 1919
- Prime Minister: Noe Jordania
- Preceded by: Grigol Giorgadze
- Succeeded by: Grigol Lordkipanidze

Personal details
- Born: 5 April 1881 Ozurget Uyezd, Kutais Governorate, Russian Empire (present-day Ozurgeti, Guria, Georgia)
- Died: 7 December 1930 (aged 49) Paris, France
- Party: Russian Social Democratic Labour Party (1902–1918); Social Democratic Labour Party of Georgia (1918–1930)

Noe Besarionis dze Ramishvili (Georgian: ნოე რამიშვილი; his name is also transliterated as Noah or Noi; 5 April 1881 – 7 December 1930) was a Georgian politician and the president of the first government of the Democratic Republic of Georgia. He was one of the leaders of the Menshevik wing of the Russian Social Democratic Labour Party. He was also known by his party noms de guerre: Pyotr, and Semyonov N.

He joined the Russian Social Democratic Labour Party in 1902 and soon became a prominent spokesman of the Mensheviks.

== Biography ==
=== Early years ===
Noe Besarionis dze Ramishvili was born into a peasant family. His father, Besarion Ramishvili, was a master of building wooden houses. In 1887 Noe enrolled in the village primary school. From 1890 to 1894 he studied at the Ozurgeti Theological Seminary. In 1894 he continued his studies at the Kutaisi Theological Seminary, where he became involved in the work of the students' social-democratic circles. After graduating, in 1900, he enrolled at Yuryev University, from which he was expelled on March 3, 1901, for participating in student activism. There he became a member of the Russian Social-Democratic Party. He was reinstated in February 1902, but was eventually expelled again and deported to the Caucasus for his revolutionary activities.

Noe Ramishvili began an active political career now he was back in Georgia. He lived in Batumi, taught private lessons, and was involved in the work of the Batumi Committee of the RSDLP. In 1903 he was a delegate of the Batumi Committee during the establishment of the RSDLP Caucasus Committee in Tbilisi. In June 1903, under his leadership, the Social-Democratic Committee of Peasants was established. Ramishvili became one of the leaders of the revolutionary movement in Batumi and Guria. In 1903 he published an illegal book, "Soldierhood". He left Batumi in 1904 because the gendarmerie was pursuing him and he settled in Tbilisi with an illegal passport under the name of "Apollon Sofromi Lomadze". There he became a member of the RSDLP Tbilisi Committee. On October 3, 1904, he was arrested and sent back to Batumi. On October 18, with the help of passengers, he fled the escort, living illegally in Rostov-on-Don and Novorossiysk. He continued his party work there and was a member of the RSDLP Level Committee. As a result of the split in the party, he sided with the Mensheviks. Participated in the debates between the Mensheviks and Bolsheviks in Batumi, Chiatura, Khidistavi.

=== 1905 Revolution ===
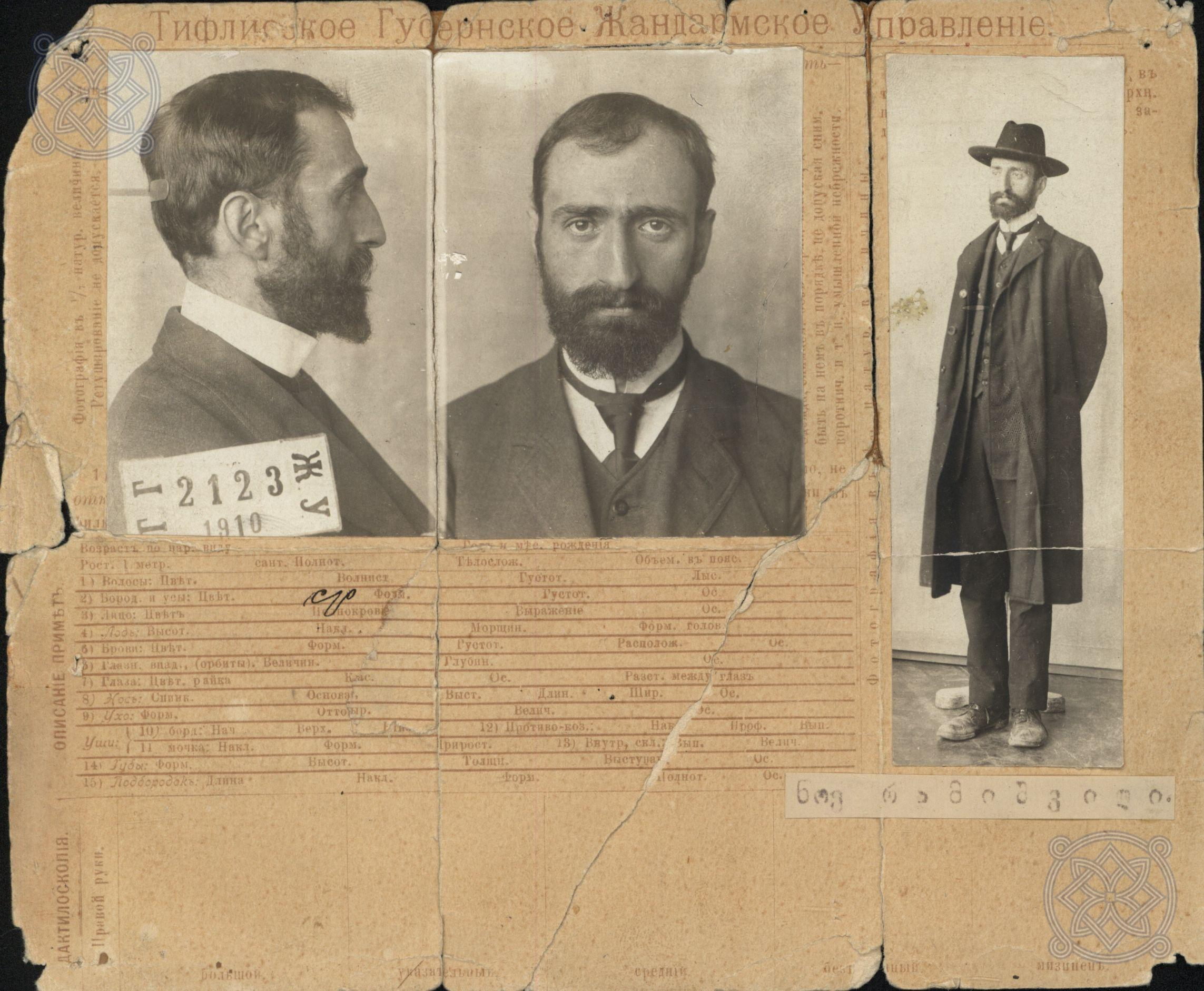
A mugshot of Ramishvili made in 1910 by the Tsarist secret police

He returned to Tbilisi in February 1905. He was elected a member of the Menshevik Caucasus Regional Committee at an illegal congress of Menshevik organizations. He was known for his oratorical talents, actively participating in discussions against the Bolsheviks, and participating in discussions in the provinces to reduce the influence of the Bolsheviks. Together with Noe Jordania, he edited the Social Democrats, an illegal Menshevik magazine. During the 1905 Russian Revolution he was one of the leaders and organizers in Tbilisi, was involved in the formation of the armed "Red Guards". The Okhranka materials referred to him as the father of revolutionary terror. He was arrested several times, but managed to free himself and return home. After the defeat of the revolution he led the restoration of weakened organizations, was the organizer of illegal party publications and led the election campaign of the Social-Democratic Party in the State Duma of the Russian Empire. In 1907, he participated in the 5th Congress of the RSDLP in London as a delegate of the Tbilisi Organization, and was elected a member of the Menshevik Central Committee.

From 1908 to 1910 he lived in Germany, studied Marxism, became acquainted with the Social Democratic Party of Germany, and was a free listener at the University of Leipzig. His areas of interest were economics and philosophy. During this period he authored the paper "Historical Materialism". In 1908, he arrived in Geneva from Leipzig to attend a meeting of the RSDLP CEC, where he confronted Stalin, leading to a physical altercation between the two. He returned to Georgia in 1910, but he was arrested on November 2 and relocated to Rostov-on-Don. He was the head of the Georgian exile colony in Rostov. In 1913 he worked for a few months in the Social-Democratic faction of the State Duma in Petrograd, then returned to Georgia illegally and headed the illegal party press - first in Kutaisi and then in Tbilisi. During the First World War he was the initiator of discussions in the party to resolve the issue of Georgian independence.

=== Georgian Revolution ===
After the February Revolution, he was appointed commissioner of the Tbilisi district. In the same year he was a member of the executive committee of the Soviet of Deputies of Workers, Peasants and Soldiers of Tbilisi. In 1917, he was elected to the Russian Constituent Assembly by the RSDLP. In November 1917, Noe Ramishvili was elected a member of the National Council of Georgia. On April 22, 1918, he was appointed Minister of Internal Affairs of the Transcaucasian Democratic Federal Republic, a loose federation of Georgia, Armenia, and Azerbaijan. He was the chairman of the Batumi peace delegation during the negotiations with the Ottoman Empire.

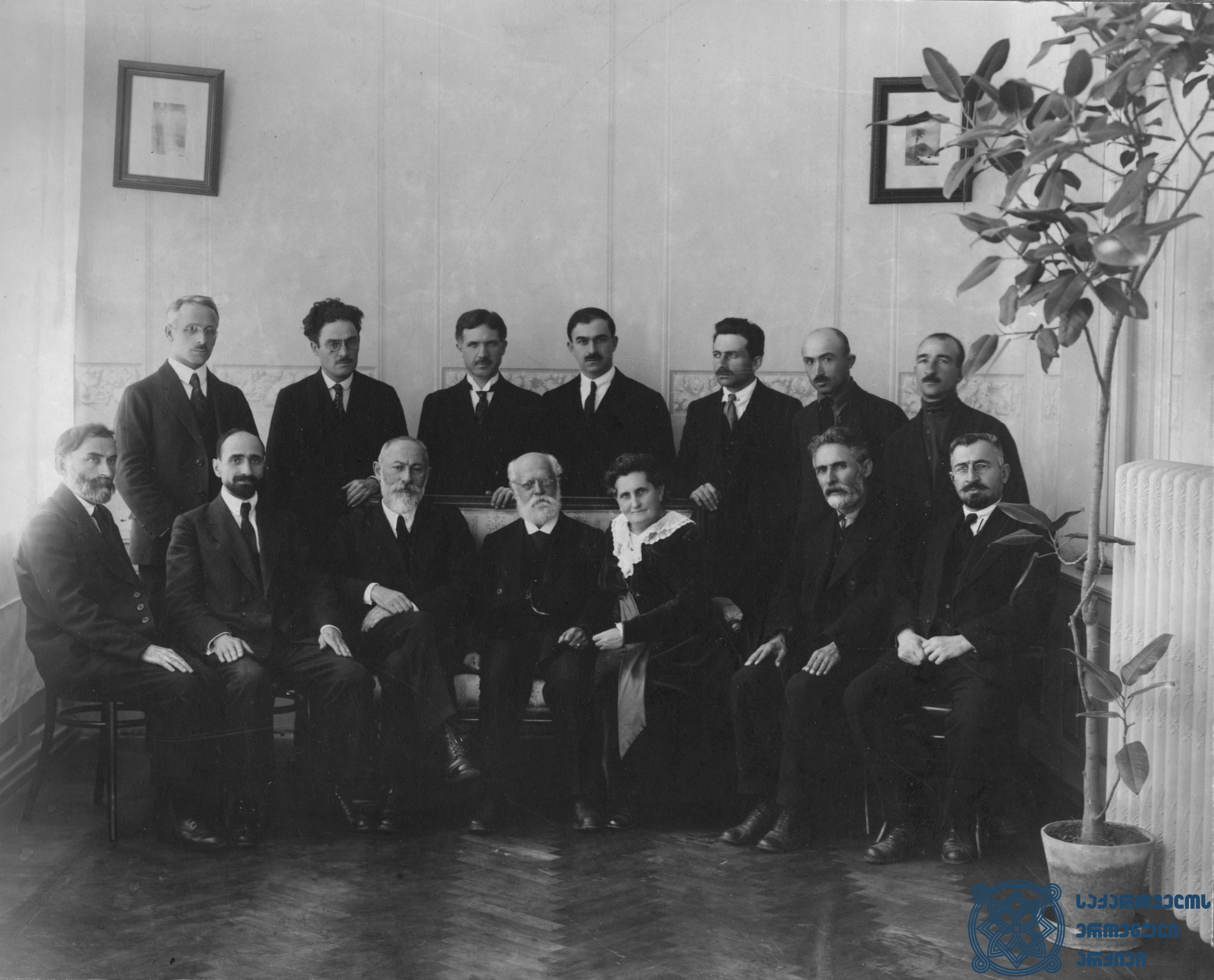
Karl Kautsky with Georgian Social-Democrats, Tbilisi, 1920. Noe Ramishvili is seated in the front row, second from left.

On May 26, 1918, he signed the Declaration of Independence, on the same day he was elected the first Chairman of the Provisional Government of the newly formed Democratic Republic of Georgia. Noe Jordania replaced him on July 24, leaving Noe Ramishvili as interior, education and military minister. During 1918 he was a member of parliament, heading the Social-Democratic faction. He was frequently criticized by the Georgian opposition for his harsh reaction to the peasant disturbances in 1918 and 1919, yet his role in preventing large-scale Bolshevik revolts cannot be overlooked.

After the Red Army invasion of Georgia, on March 17, 1921, Ramishvili emigrated to France. He first lived with his family in Saint-Cloud, then in Leuville-sur-Orge. The struggle against the Bolshevik regime did not stop, Ramishvili joined the Committee for the Independence of Georgia and became an active organizer during the August Uprising, which ended unsuccessfully and was followed by mass repressions against the Georgian nobility and intellectuals. Ramishvili was actively involved in the anti-Bolshevik Promethean movement produced by Poland.

On December 7, 1930, Noe Ramishvili was assassinated by the NKVD agents in Paris. He was buried in Leuville cemetery. His family, who remained in Georgia, fell victim to Bolshevik repression.

Preceded by -	Prime Minister of Georgia; 1918	Succeeded by Noe Zhordania
