= Abkhazian Autonomy =

Former Georgian administrative unit

The Abkhazian Autonomy (Georgian: აფხაზეთის ავტონომია) was an autonomous unit within the Democratic Republic of Georgia from 1919 to 1921, encompassing the territory of historical Abkhazia.

== History ==
On 13 February 1919, the elections were held to the Abkhazian People's Council, the legislative body of the region. As a result of elections, Arzakan (Dimitri) Emukhvari became the chairman of the Council. He soon became the chairman of the Abkhazian Commissariat (government), while Varlam Shervashidze replaced him as the chairman of the Council. Seven factions were represented in the Council as the 27 Social Democrats, 4 Independent Socialists, 3 non-partisan right-wingers, 3 Socialist-Revolutionaries, 1 National Democrat, 1 Socialist-Federalist and 1 non-partisan colonist were elected. Twenty deputies were ethnic Abkhazians, but only seven from them were anti-Georgian (4 Independent Socialists and 3 non-partisan right-wingers). On March 20, 1919, the newly elected Abkhazian People's Council adopted the "Act on Abkhazian Autonomy". 34 deputies attended the session, 27 deputies voted in favor, 3 abstained, while 4 did not vote. The act stated:

1. Abkhazia is included in the state structure of Georgia as an autonomous element, about which it informs the Parliament and Government of Georgia;
2. A constitution should be created for autonomous Abkhazia, which would regulate the relationship between the central (common-Georgian) and autonomous authorities;
3. A mixed parity commission should be formed to draft the constitution, consisting of members of the People's Council and deputies of the Parliament of Georgia;
4. The provisions developed by this commission should be included in the Constitution of the Democratic Republic of Georgia.

During his speech at the Constituent Assembly of Georgia, Noe Zhordania voiced the Georgian government's attitude towards the status of Abkhazia:

We can accept all their (the Abkhazian People's Council's) demands regarding autonomy, no matter how broad they are. We cannot accept just one: secession from us and joining Denikin.

The constitutional commission that drafted the constitution of autonomous Abkhazia had different opinions regarding the level of autonomy. The debates lasted for more than a year. Several preliminary drafts were created, which failed to receive the necessary two-thirds of the votes. There were intensive consultations with Tbilisi. Eventually, the main internal disagreements were overcome. On July 1, 1920, the People's Council of Abkhazia submitted three drafts of the constitution of autonomous Abkhazia to the Georgian Parliament, with the aim of approving one of them at a session of the Constituent Assembly. These drafts included the following main provisions:

1. Abkhazia is an autonomous entity within Georgia;
2. The central legislative and executive bodies of Georgia are responsible for foreign policy, defense, financial, tax and judicial systems, postal, telegraph, railway and highway networks;
3. All other spheres of life in Abkhazia remain under the jurisdiction of the Commissariat of the People's Council of Abkhazia.

On October 16, 1920, the People's Council of Abkhazia approved the final draft Constitution of the Abkhazian Autonomy and sent it to the Constituent Assembly of Georgia. The constitution confirmed the autonomous status of Abkhazia within the Democratic Republic of Georgia. This ended the first phase of the work on the constitution involving the People's Council of Abkhazia. The first article of the draft stated:

Abkhazia, from the Mekhadiri River to the Enguri River, and from the Black Sea coast to the Caucasus Mountains, is an integral part of the Republic of Georgia and autonomously manages its internal affairs within these borders.

On 4 November 1920, the delegation of the Abkhaz People's Council led by Varlam Shervashidze arrived to Tbilisi. An agreement was reached on autonomy and the division of government powers between Tbilisi and Sukhumi. On December 29, 1920 , the so-called "Small Constitutional Commission" of the Constituent Assembly of Georgia adopted the "Statue on the Governance of Autonomous Abkhazia". It was based on the constitutional project approved by the People's Council of Abkhazia on 16 October 1920. The Constituent Assembly of Georgia incorporated the basic principles of Abkhazian autonomy into the Constitution of Georgia on 21 February 1921.

The Georgian Democratic Republic ceased to exist following the Soviet Russian invasion of Georgia in February and March 1921.

== Sources ==
- Kupatadze, Bekari (2018). Georgian Democratic Republic (1918–1921). Tbilisi, Georgia: Tbilisi State University.
- Papaskiri, Zurab (2007). Studies on the Historical Past of Modern Abkhazia, Part 2, 1917-1993. Tbilisi, Georgia: Sokhumi Branch of the Tbilisi State University. ISBN 978-99940-68-79-1.
- Chervonnaia, Svetlana (1994). Conflict in the Caucasus: Georgia, Abkhazia and the Russian Shadow. Gothic Image. ISBN 9780906362303.
