= 1919 Abkhazian People's Council election =

- 13 February 1919
- All 40 seats in the People's Council of Abkhazia; 21 seats needed for a majority
Party	Leader	Seats	+/–
Social Democratic Party of Georgia		27	New
Independent Socialists		4	New
Non-partisans		4	New
Socialist-Revolutionary Party of Georgia		3	New
Georgian Socialist-Federalist Revolutionary Party		1	New
National Democrats of Georgia		1	New
This lists parties that won seats. See the complete results below.

Elections to the People's Council were held in Abkhazia on 13 February 1919, alongside parliamentary elections in Georgia.

== Results ==
The Social Democrats won 27 of the 40 seats; 11 members of the party were Abkhazians and 11 Georgians, with the remaining five having other ethnicities. Seats were also held by social federalists, an Abkhaz independent socialist group, an independent right-wing group, Socialist Revolutionaries, people's democrats and colonists.

Of the 40 members, 18 were Abkhazian, 16 Georgian and six from other ethnic groups.

== Aftermath ==
Following its election, the Council split along ethnic lines, with Abkhaz members of the Social Democratic Party joining the independent socialists to form an Abkhaz opposition. Despite the split, the Council voted in favour of Abkhazia being an autonomous region of Georgia.
