= Iosif Baratov =

Georgian politician and lawyer (1872–1937)

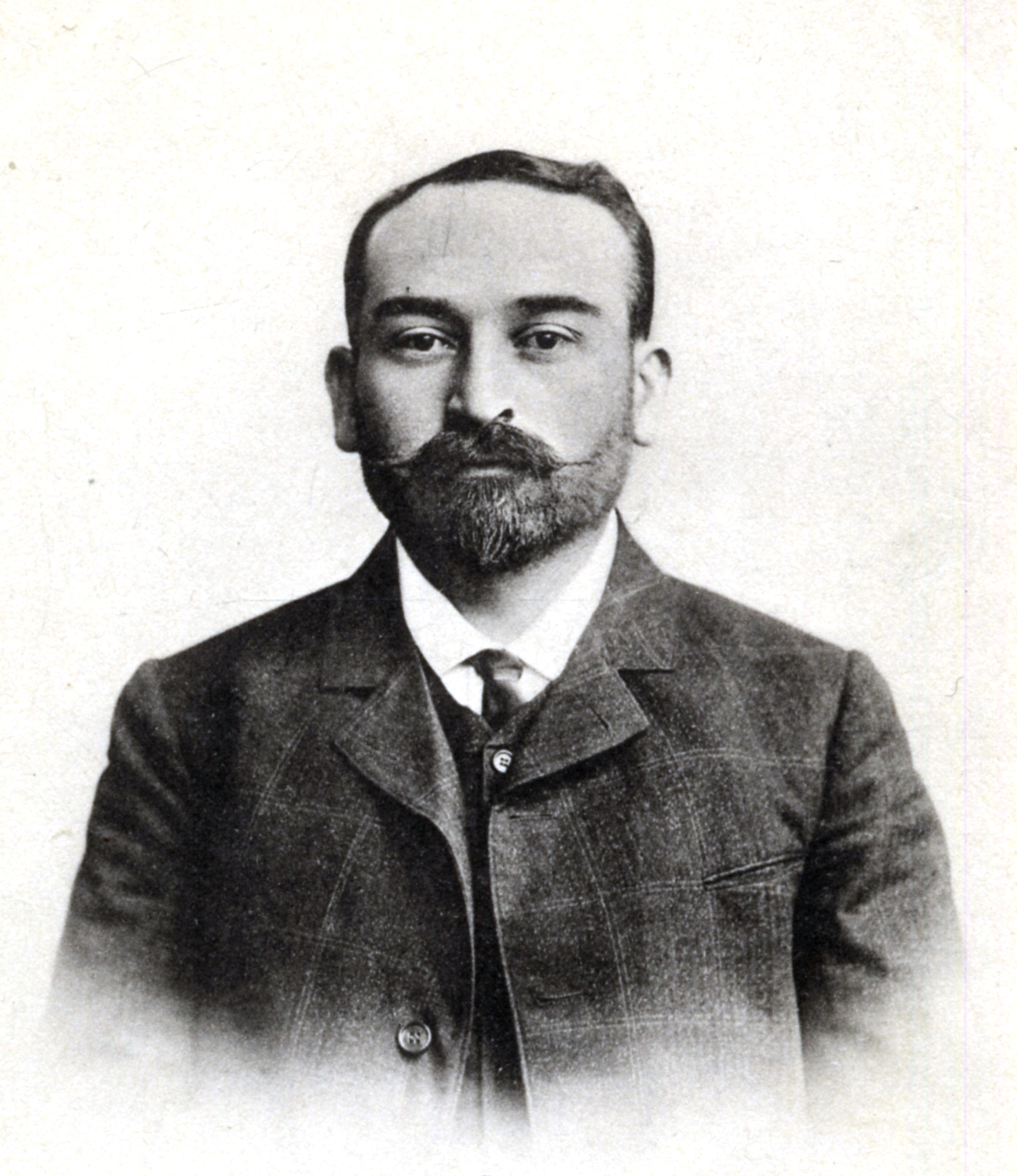
Iosif Baratashvili in 1906

Iosif Baratashvili (Georgian: იოსებ ბარათაშვილი; 1872–1937) was a Georgian politician. He belonged to the Georgian Socialist-Federalist Revolutionary Party. In the first Duma election in 1906, Baratashvili won a seat from Tiflis. He was murdered during the Great Purge.

== Early years ==
Prince Iosif Baratov was descended from an ancient Georgian noble family, the Baratashvili family, Orthodox by faith. He graduated from the 2nd gymnasium of Tiflis, and in 1899 from the Faculty of Law of the Saint Petersburg Imperial University. Returning to Tiflis in 1901, he practiced law. He worked as a lawyer of the District Court of Tiflis, a representative of the City Duma of Tiflis and a member of the committee of the "Society for Spreading Literacy Among Georgians".

In 1901, he was one of the founders of the Georgian Socialist-Federalist Revolutionary Party and was a member of its main committee during the party's existence.

On June 26, 1906, he was elected a deputy of the 1st convocation of the State Duma from the general electorate of the Tiflis provincial electoral assembly. He was a member of the "Trudoviks" group. He served as member of the commission for implementation of the state list of incomes and expenses. During the debates in the Duma, he spoke about ten times, including meetings, the application of the death penalty, providing food aid to the population, the Bialystok pogroms, and the government's policy on the agrarian issue.

On July 10, 1906, in the city of Vyborg, he signed the "Vyborg Complaint", for which he was sentenced to three months in prison and deprived of the right to vote under Article 129, Part 1, Clauses 51 and 3 of the Criminal Code.

As a lawyer, he participated in political trials, particularly in the case of Arsen Georgiashvili in 1917. He was a member of the "Society for Spreading Literacy Among Georgians" and the "Drama Society of Georgia". His articles were published in periodicals such as "Iveria" and "People's Affairs".

In the same years, 1901–1917, he was one of the prominent figures of the national liberation movement. His contribution to the struggle for the restoration of the autonomy of the Georgian Orthodox Church, which was crowned with success in 1917, was significant. He was a member of the "University Foundation Society", with whose active support Tbilisi State University was founded in 1918.

In 1917–1918, Baratashvili was elected a member of the National Council. On May 26, 1918, he signed the Declaration of Independence of Georgia.

In 1918, he performed the duties of the Minister of Justice of the Democratic Republic of Georgia. In 1919–1921, he was elected a member of the Constituent Assembly of Georgia.

In February–March 1921, during the Sovietization of Georgia, Baratashvili was an active member of the illegal organization of federalists. In 1923 he was arrested by the Cheka and imprisoned.

In the years 1922–1937 he worked as a lawyer, in 1923 he was a defense attorney in the case of Catholicos-Patriarch Ambrosios (Khelaya). He lived in Tiflis, at 20 Lenin Street (now Merab Kostava).

In 1937, Baratashvili was again arrested and executed by order of the "troika" of the Georgian Soviet Socialist Republic. He was posthumously rehabilitated in 1956.

== See also ==
- Samson Dadiani
- Konstantine Andronikashvili
