= Transcaucasus electoral district =

Transcaucasus
- Former Civilian constituency for the All-Russian Constituent Assembly
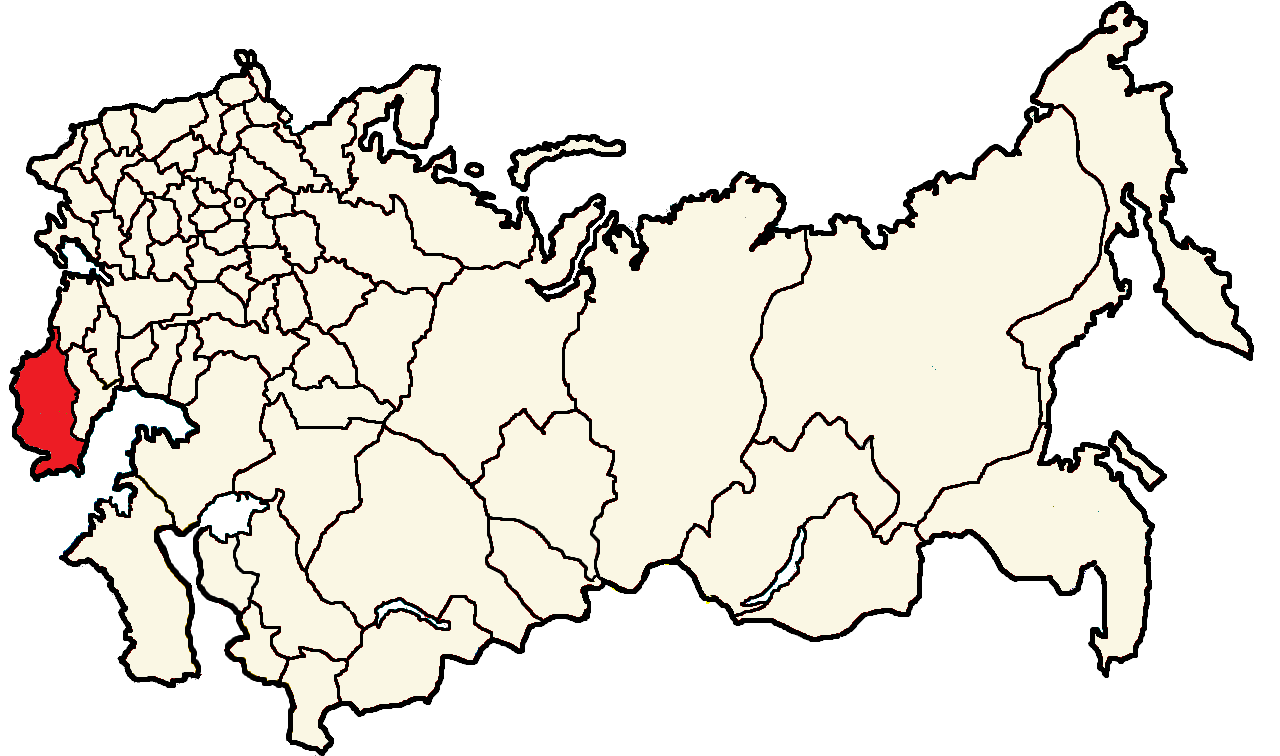

Former constituency
- Created: 1917
- Abolished: 1918
- Number of members: 36
- Number of Uyezd Electoral Commissions: 45
- Number of Urban Electoral Commissions: 11
- Number of Parishes: 1,450

The Transcaucasus electoral district (Russian: Закавказский избирательный округ) was a constituency created for the 1917 Russian Constituent Assembly election. The electoral district covered the Baku Governorate, the Elizavetpol Governorate, the Erivan Governorate, the Kutais Governorate, the Tiflis Governorate, the Batum Oblast, the Kars Oblast, the Sukhum Okrug and the Zakatal Okrug.

== Creation of the Transcaucasian constituency ==
Across Russia, electoral districts for the Constituent Assembly election generally followed governorate or oblast boundaries. But in the southern Caucasus a single constituency was created for six governorates, two oblasts and two okrugs. In the debates in the All-Russian Electoral Commission the Armenian scholar Dr. Nicholas Adontz had argued in favour of creating three separate districts - Armenian, Georgian and Muslim. Muslim representatives had argued against this proposal, and in the end the Russian electoral authorities opted for a single Transcaucasian constituency. By mid-1917 the Central Transcaucasian Commission for the Elections to the Constituent Assembly was set-up, under the aegis of the Special Transcaucasian Committee (OZAKOM).

== Candidatures and voting ==
The vote was held in Transcaucasus November 26–28, within two weeks of the formation of the Transcaucasian Commissariat (Zavakom). 15 lists were in the fray in Transcaucasus. The three largest parties in Transcaucasus were the Mensheviks, the Musavat Party and the Armenian Revolutionary Federation (Dashnaksiun). Whilst the Mensheviks were the most voted party, in Transcaucasus Menshevism had become intertwined with Georgian nationalism. Soon after the election, the Georgian Mensheviks would become openly nationalistic. The Bolshevik vote came mainly from soldiers at the Baku garrison and blue-collar workers of the same city.

There were four Muslim lists in the fray. List 14 of the party 'Muslims of Russia' was headed by Sultan Medzhid Ganizade, Mir Yaqub Mehdiyev, Mahmudbek Mahmudbekov and Heybatgulu Mammadbayov. List 11 of the Hummet Party was led by Asadullah Axundov. List 12 of the Muslim Socialist Bloc was led by Ibrahim Gaydarov, Alikhan Kantimirov and Aslan bey Safikurdski. List 13 of the Western Transcaucasian Muslims was headed by Akper-Bek Kazimbekov.

=== Constituency-wide results ===
Transcaucasus
| Party | Vote | % |
|---|---|---|
| List 1 - Mensheviks | 661,934 | 26.96 |
| List 10 - Musavat Party | 615,816 | 25.08 |
| List 4 - Armenian Revolutionary Federation | 558,440 | 22.74 |
| List 12 - Muslim Socialist Bloc | 159,770 | 6.51 |
| List 3 - Socialist-Revolutionaries | 117,522 | 4.79 |
| List 5 - Bolsheviks | 93,581 | 3.81 |
| List 11 - Hummet | 84,743 | 3.45 |
| List 14 - Ittihad | 66,505 | 2.71 |
| List 8 - Georgian National Democrats | 25,733 | 1.05 |
| List 2 - Kadets | 25,637 | 1.04 |
| List 6 - Georgian Socialist-Federalists | 22,754 | 0.93 |
| List 7 - Armenian Populist Party | 15,180 | 0.62 |
| List 15 - Zionists | 7,018 | 0.29 |
| List 9 - Popular Socialists | 570 | 0.02 |
| List 13 - Transcaucasian Muslims | 71 | 0.00 |
| Total: | 2,455,274 | |

=== Baku Governorate ===
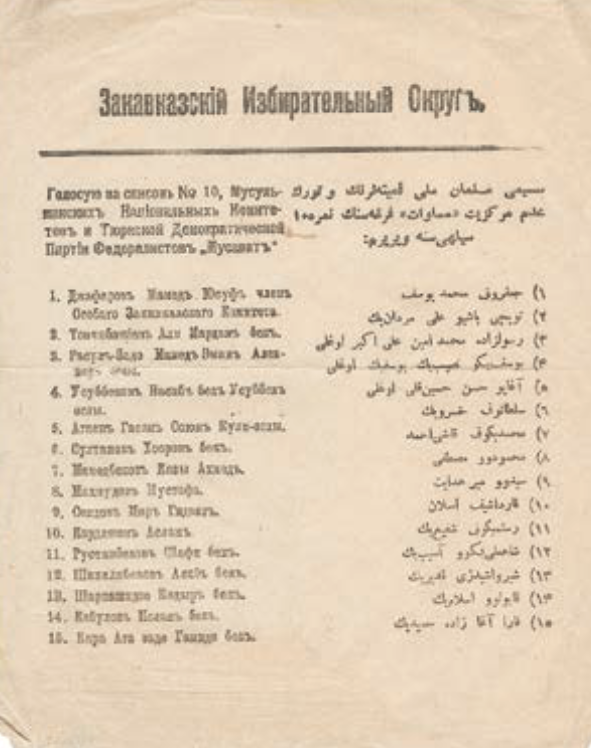
Ballot of List 10 - Muslim National Committees and the Turkic Democratic Federalist Party "Musavat". In Russian language to the left, in Turkic on the right.

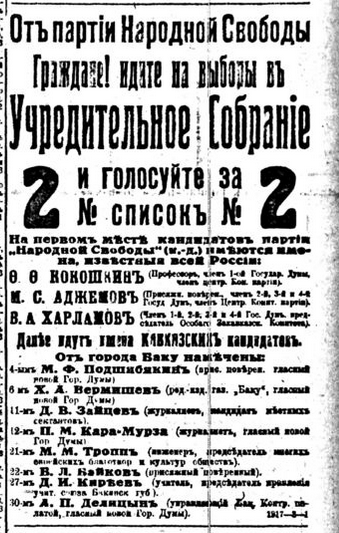
Advert for the Kadet list in Kaspi newspaper, November 23, 1917

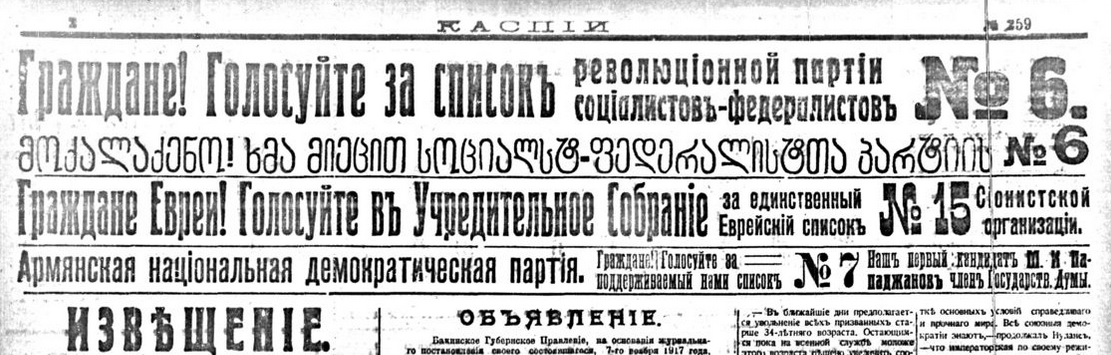
Adverts in Kaspi newspaper for List 6 (Georgian Socialist-Federalists), List 15 (Zionists) and List 7 (Armenian Populists)

Musavat won most of the Azerbaijani vote in Baku Governorate, followed by Ittihad.

==== Baku city ====
The vote in Baku city and its surrounding industrial areas differed greatly from the rest of the governorate, with a strong Bolshevik and Armenian vote. At the oil fields and the garrison the voter participation stood at around 75%, whilst in the city proper around 52%. There were clashes reported between Musavat and Ittihad and between the Muslim Socialist Bloc and Hummet, although no major disruptions on the polling day.

The Bolsheviks obtained 22,276 votes (20.1%), followed by Musavat with 21,752 votes (19.6%), Dashnaks with 20,314 votes (18.3%), SRs with 18,789 votes (16.9%), Kadets with 9,062 votes (8.2%), Ittihad with 7,850 votes (7.1%), Mensheviks 5,667 votes (5.1%), Zionists 2,081 votes (1.9%), Armenian Populists 1,508 votes (1.4%), Muslim Socialist Bloc 903 votes (0.8%), Georgian Socialist-Federalists 456 votes (0.4%), Georgian National Democrats 145 votes (0.1%), Popular Socialists 116 votes (0.1%) and Western Transcaucasian Muslims 3 votes. In the city proper (i.e. excluding the oil fields and the garrison) the Dashnaks obtained the highest vote, 12,517 votes, followed by the Musavat and Bolshevik lists. The Kadet vote in the governorate was centered in Baku city. In the Baku garrison the Bolsheviks got 7,699 voted (70.8%). The Bolsheviks scored an even bigger victory amongst the prisoners at the Baku jail, with 186 out of 198 votes.

==== Baku uezd ====
Ittihad won the elections in the rural areas of Baku uezd, in the villages of the Absheron Peninsula. Out of 25,748 votes cast in the uezd, Ittihad obtained 19,812 (76.95%).

==== Geokchai uezd ====
In the Geokchai uezd the Musavat list got 27,046 votes (55.42%), Ittihad 14,517 votes (29.75%) and other parties 7,236 votes (14.83%).

==== Lenkoran uezd ====
In the Lenkoran uezd the Musavat list obtained 53,910 votes (83.99%), Ittihad 7,625 votes (11.88%), SRs 848 votes (1.32%), Bolsheviks 789 votes (1.23%) and others 1,011 votes (1.57%).

=== Tiflis ===
In Tiflis the Mensheviks got 31,288 votes (36.8%), the Dashnaks 19,595 votes (19.3%), the Bolsheviks 19,172 votes (18.8%), the SRs 11,504 (11.3%), the Kadets 9,565 votes (9.4%), Georgian Federalists-Socialists 3,496 votes (3.4%), Georgian National Democrats 3,282 votes (3.3%), Armenian Populists 1,612 votes (1.6%), Zionists 794 votes (0.8%), Muslim Socialist Bloc 433 votes (0.4%), Hummet 407 votes (0.4%), Musavat 322 votes (0.3%), Popular Socialists 252 (0.2%), Trancaucasian Muslims 4 votes and Ittehad 2 votes. The Bolsheviks quadrupled their vote compared to the July 1917 Tiflis city duma election. In the Tiflis garrison the Bolsheviks got 13,138 votes (44.7%), the SRs 7,734 votes (26.3%), the Mensheviks 4,173 votes (14.2%), the Kadets 1,767 votes (6%), Dashnaks 1,377 votes (4.7%), Georgian Socialist-Federalists 489 votes (1.7%), Musavat 322 votes (1.1%), Georgian National Democrats 192 votes (0.7%), Zioists 55 votes (0.2%), Armenian Populists 52 votes (0.2%), Popular Socialists 47 (0.2%), Hummet 47 votes (0.2%), Western Transcaucasian Muslims 3 votes, Ittehad 2 votes and Muslim Socialist Bloc 1 vote.

=== Batum ===
In Batum, the Mensheviks got 6,809 votes (34.6%), the SRs 5,801 votes (29.5%), the Bolsheviks 2,926 votes (14.9%), Dashnaks 1,471 votes (7.1%), Kadets 1,400 votes (7.1%), Georgian Socialist-Federalists 481 votes (2.5%), Georgian National Democrats 328 votes (1.7%), Zionists 300 votes (1.5%), Armenian Populists 105 votes (0.5%), Musavat 46 votes (0.2%), Muslim Socialist Bloc 7 votes and Hummet 1 vote. However, the SR and Bolshevik vote came largely from the city garrison, where the two parties obtained 4,825 votes (44.2% of the garrison vote) and 2,614 votes (24%) respectively.

=== Deputies elected ===
Deputies Elected
| Bekzadyan | Menshevik |
| Chkheidze | Menshevik |
| Chkhenkeli | Menshevik |
| Djibladze | Menshevik |
| Gegechkori | Menshevik |
| Georgadze | Menshevik |
| Lomtatidze | Menshevik |
| Ramishvili, I. V. | Menshevik |
| Ramishvili, N. V. | Menshevik |
| Skobelev | Menshevik |
| Smirnov | Menshevik |
| Tsereteli | Menshevik |
| Zhordania | Menshevik |
| Zurabov | Menshevik |
| Aghayev | Musavat |
| Jafarov | Musavat |
| Mamedbekov | Musavat |
| Rasulzadeh | Musavat |
| Sultanov | Musavat |
| Topchubashov | Musavat |
| Yusifbeyli | Musavat |
| Akhundov | Hummet |
| Gaidarov | Muslim Socialist Bloc |
| Kantemirov | Muslim Socialist Bloc |
| Safikurdski | Muslim Socialist Bloc |
| Ganiev | Ittihad |
| Atabekyan | SR |
| Lunkevich | SR |
| Ambartsumyan | Dashnak |
| Gazazyan | Dashnak |
| Hovhannisyan-Varandyan | Dashnak |
| Ohanjanyan | Dashnak |
| Shahatunyan | Dashnak |
| Shahnazaryan-Araratyan | Dashnak |
| Zavriev | Dashnak |
| Ter-Ovanesyan (Kachaznuni) | Dashnak |
| Tigranyan | Dashnak |
| Zoryan-Rostom | Dashnak |
| Shaumian | Bolshevik |
