= National Council of Georgia =

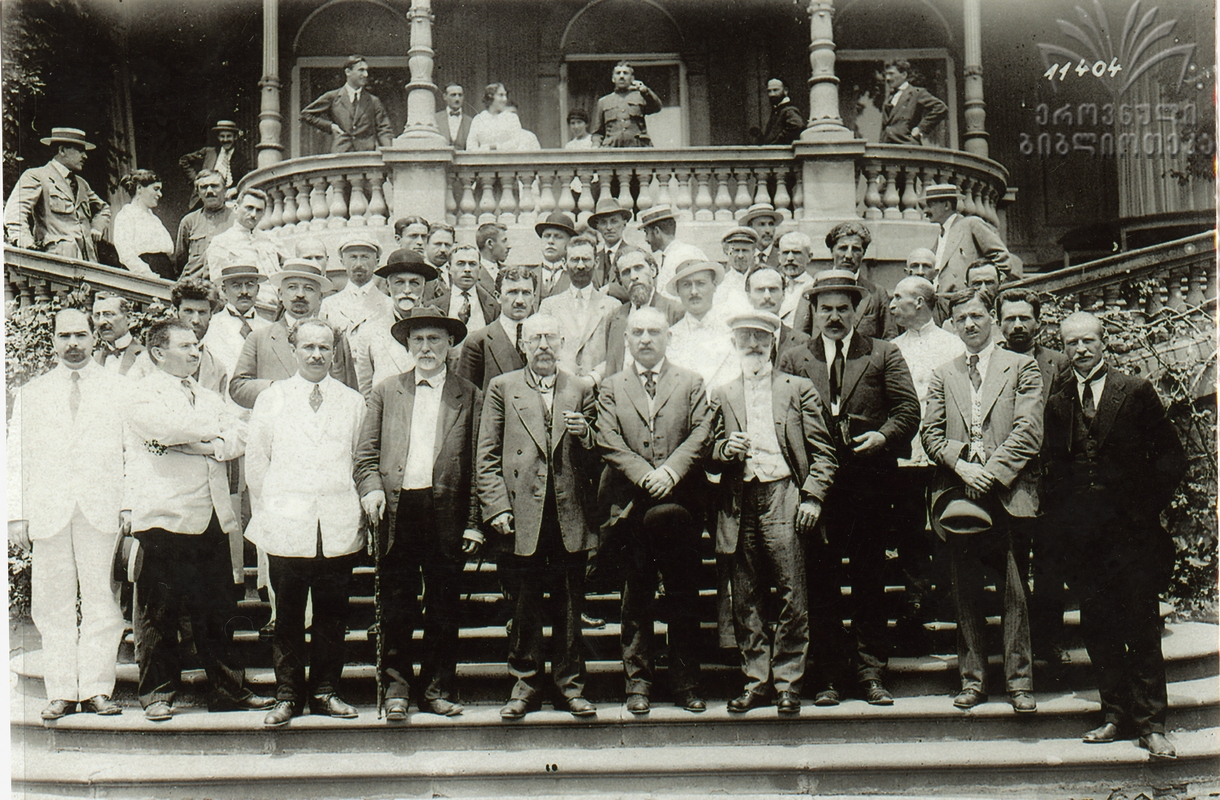
Members of the National Council of Georgia, after declaring independence of Georgia, Tbilisi May 26, 1918

The National Council of Georgia (Georgian: საქართველოს ეროვნული საბჭო, sakartvelos erovnuli sabcho) was the first delegated legislative body formed by Georgia's major political parties and social organizations on November 19, 1917, during the Russian Revolution. The Council presided over the declaration of independence of the Democratic Republic of Georgia on May 26, 1918, and was renamed into the Parliament of Georgia (საქართველოს პარლამენტი, sakartvelos parlament'i) on October 4, 1918. It was succeeded by the Constituent Assembly of Georgia, a legislative body elected through the nationwide general elections on February 14, 1919.

== Formation ==
The National Council of Georgia (NCG) was elected at the National Congress of Georgia held in the State Treasury Theater in Tiflis (now Tbilisi Opera and Ballet Theatre) from November 19 to 23, 1917, and attended by 329 delegates from Georgia’s all major political parties and social organizations, ranging from trade unions to noble assemblies and the church. This was the reaction to the Bolshevik coup in Russia of which Georgia was formally still a part. The Council was dominated by the Georgian Social Democratic (Menshevik) Party and the Menshevik Akaki Chkhenkeli was elected its chairman.

== Political role ==
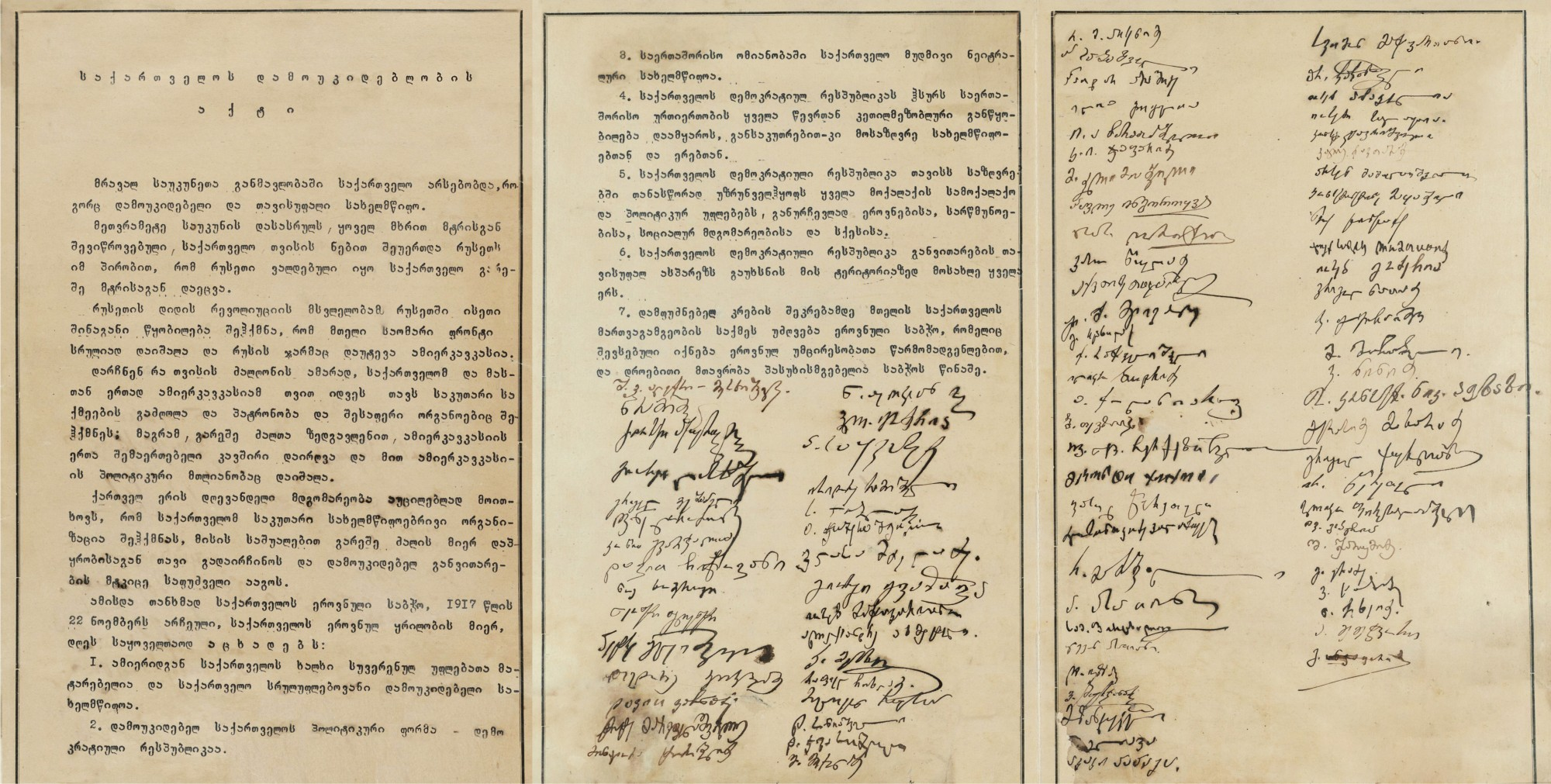
Act of Independence of Georgia. May 26, 1918

The Georgian National Council did not initially achieve the influence that its counterparts enjoyed among the Armenians and Azerbaijanis and remained overshadowed by the Tiflis Soviet of Workers' and Soldiers' Deputies – dominated by the fragile bloc of the Mensheviks and SRs – until the formation of the Transcaucasian Commissariat in November 1917.

On May 26, 1918, the NCG declared the independence of Georgia in the form of a democratic republic and assumed the role of the republic's legislature to which the provisional government of Georgia – chaired by Noe Ramishvili and then by Noe Zhordania – was accountable. The expanded NCG was converted into the Parliament of Georgia on October 4, 1918, and Karlo Chkheidze became its new chairman. Under its guidance, the general elections for the Constituent Assembly were prepared and organized in February 1919.
