= Socialist-Revolutionary Party of Georgia =

Former political party in Georgia

Socialist-Revolutionary Party of Georgia საქართველოს სოციალისტ-რევოლუციონერთა პარტია
- Leader: Leo Shengelaia
- Founded: 1918
- Dissolved: 1921
- Newspaper: Shroma
- Ideology: Agrarian socialism Democratic socialism
- Political position: Left-wing
- Constituent Assembly of Georgia: 5 / 130

The Georgian Socialist Revolutionary Party, also known as SRs, was a political party in Georgia. It split from the Russian party of the same name in June 1918. It received 5 mandates in the Georgian Constituent Assembly following the 1919 elections. After the Soviet invasion of Georgia, the party ceased to exist in the end of 1921.

== Socialist Revolutionaries in Georgia ==
Small circles of SRs had existed in Georgia since 1901. They mainly included non-Georgian internationalist revolutionaries, especially Russians (Alexandr Kalyuzhny, the Beck couple, V. Maikov, etc.), as well as Georgians (Ivane Jabadari, Misho Kipiani). Their influence in Georgia was insignificant. Since 1905, the Tbilisi, Batumi, Kutaisi and Baku committees of the Socialist Revolutionary Party had been united in the Caucasian Union of the Russian Socialist Revolutionary Party. During the Russian Revolution of 1905, the Caucasian military organization of the Socialist Revolutionary Party organized an attack on the Tbilisi Police Chief Martynov, issued several proclamations, and held a Transcaucasian regional congress.

After the February Revolution of 1917, the Socialist Revolutionary Party became active again in Georgia. In April 1917, the conference of Transcaucasian Socialist Revolutionaries' organizations was held, which decided to develop a unified platform together with the Mensheviks and the Socialist-Federalists. Georgian Socialist Revolutionaries participated in the work of the Georgian National Interparty Council and the Georgian National Congress, 12 of their representatives entered the National Council of Georgia.

== Georgian Socialist Revolutionary Party ==
In May 1918, the VII Conference of Caucasian Organizations of the Socialist Revolutionary Party was held, and as a result of the split that occurred, the independent party of Socialist Revolutionaries of Georgia was created at the First Constituent Congress in Kutaisi in June 1918. The Second Congress of the Georgian Socialist Revolutionary Party convened on December 10-15 of the same year. The program and statute were revised at that conference. The cornerstone of the party in the agrarian sphere remained the socialization of land. The Socialist Revolutionaries believed that Russian Bolshevism was socialism without democracy, while Georgian Menshevism was democracy without socialism. They were outright supporters of the realization of the socialist system and often criticized the government from leftist positions.

The Second Congress elected Leo Shengelaia as the chairman of the Socialist Revolutionary Party and editor of the main party organ, the newspaper "Shroma". His deputy was Ivane Gobechia. The Socialist Revolutionary Party (SR) members of the Georgian National Council, later known as the Parliament, included: Kote Meskhi, Grigol Natadze, Vladimer Gobechia, Ivane Cherkezishvili, Ivane Gobechia, Ioseb Abakelia, Konstantin Javrishvili, Leo Shengelaia, Mikheil Pachuashvili, Ilia Kakabadze, Ivane Varazashvili. In the first coalition government of independent Georgia, the Socialist Revolutionary Party (SR) members were represented by the Minister of Roads, Ivane Lortkipanidze, but they were not satisfied with him. A small group of SR internationalists was also formed in Georgia, which did not support Georgian independence (the group of the newspaper "Znamya Naroda": Nikoloz Tarkhanov, Leon Tumanov).

The Georgian Socialist Revolutionary Party participated in the elections to the Constituent Assembly of Georgia in February 1919 as number 3. There were 5 female candidates on the party's 73-member electoral list. The party received 5 mandates in the elections (L. Shengelaia, Ivane and Ioseb Gobechiev, Ilia Nutsubidze and Gr. Natadze).

Following the Soviet invasion of Georgia, in the early days of the Bolshevik government, the SR Party split into two - left-wing and right-wing parts. The left chose to cooperate with the Soviet government. The rightists in the newspaper "Shroma" criticized the Bolshevik government for the "denationalization of the Georgian nation", the "violation of the rights of the Georgian language", and opposed the creation of the Transcaucasian Socialist Federative Soviet Republic and the implementation of a New Economic Policy. Their activities lasted for a short time. At the end of 1921, the Georgian Socialist Revolutionary Party ceased to exist. Even the Georgian Extraordinary Commission (Cheka) did not have any information about the activities of the Socialist Revolutionary Party in 1922-1923.

== Political Program ==
The party program for the Constituent Assembly election was published on February 12, 1919 in the newspaper "Shroma". The party program envisaged the socialization of the tools and means of production, the collectivization of labor and property. Land was to be confiscated from landlords, the treasury, and the church and declared the common property of the people, and the trade of land was to be banned. Small landowners would have the right to possess land and transfer it through inheritance, while the rest of land would be distributed between the central and local authorities. The management of the mine would be the responsibility of the central government.

The party's program for workers included an 8-hour working day, state insurance, the introduction of labor inspection, the prohibition of child labor, and the establishment of a minimum wage.

The party recognized personal and political freedoms, the right to state-funded education, the separation of church and state, and the election of officials.

The party advocated permanent neutrality and the creation of a people's militia.

== Sources ==
- Shvelidze, Dimitri (2018). საქართველოს დემოკრატიული რესპუბლიკა (1918–1921) (PDF). Tbilisi, Georgia: ენციკლოპედია-ლექსიკონი. pp. 411–412.
- Shvelidze, Dimitri (2014). Sakartvelo (Encyclopedia). Vol. 3. Tbilisi, Georgia. p. 100.
- Iremadze, Irakli; Chanturidze, Salome (2017). პირველი საყოველთაო დემოკრატიული არჩევნები დამოუკიდებელ საქართველოში. Tbilisi, Georgia. p. 42. ISBN 9789941279621.
