= Democratic Republic of Georgia =

State in the Caucasus (1918–1921)

Coordinates: 41°43′N 44°47′E

Democratic Republic of Georgia საქართველოს დემოკრატიული რესპუბლიკა (Georgian)
- 1918–1921
- Flag Emblem
- Anthem: დიდება Dideba "Glory"
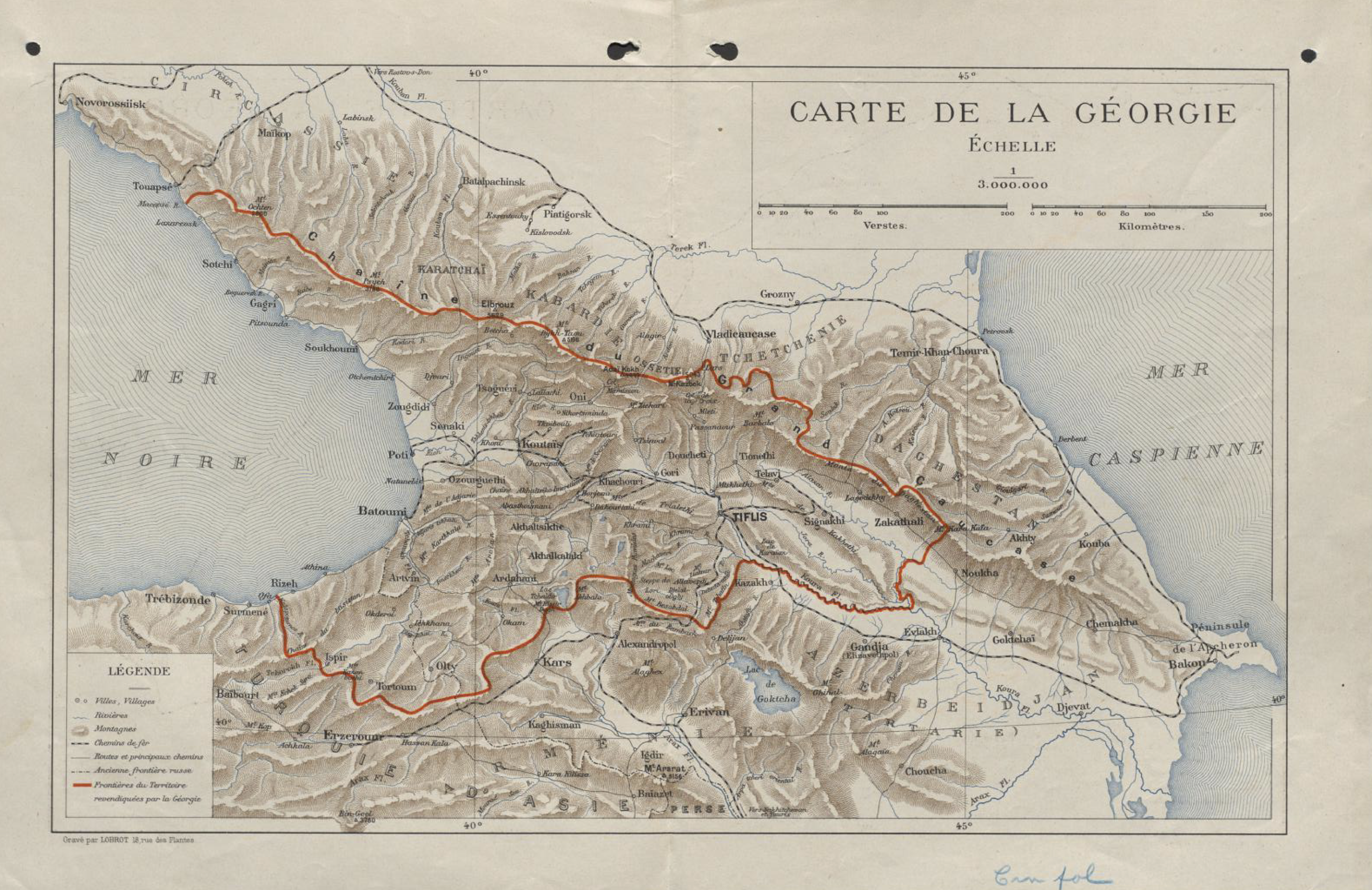
- Map of borders submitted by the Democratic Republic of Georgia to the Paris Peace Conference in 1921, including territories that were disputed or subsequently lost.
- Capital: Tiflis (present-day Tbilisi)
- Common languages: Georgian (official) Regional: Russian; Armenian; Abkhaz; Azerbaijani; Greek; Ossetian; Svan; Mingrelian; Laz; Turkish
- Religion: Secular state Majority; Georgian Orthodox Church; Minority: Islam Catholic Church (Latin and Eastern rites) Judaism Ossetian folk religion
- Demonym: Georgian
- Government: Unitary parliamentary republic with an executive presidency: under a provisional government (May 1918 – February 1919)
- Chairman
  - 1918: Noe Ramishvili
  - 1918–1921: Noe Zhordania
- Legislature: National Council (1918–1919); Constituent Assembly (1919–1921)
- Historical era: Interwar period
  - Independence declared: 26 May 1918
  - Parliamentary elections: 14–16 February 1919
  - Treaty of Moscow: 7 May 1920
  - Soviet invasion: 11 February–17 March 1921
  - Soviet occupation: 25 February 1921
  - Soviet annexation: 30 December 1922
  - Government-in-exile: 18 March 1921

Area
- 1918: 75,110 km^{2} (29,000 sq mi)
- 1919: 107,600 km^{2} (41,500 sq mi)

Population
  - 1918: 2,852,000
  - 1919: ~2,500,000
  - 1921: 2,677,000
- Currency: Georgian maneti
Preceded by
Transcaucasian Democratic Federative Republic
Succeeded by
Georgian Soviet Socialist Republic
Socialist Soviet Republic of Abkhazia
Turkey
- Today part of: Georgia; Armenia; Azerbaijan; Russia; Turkey

The Democratic Republic of Georgia (DRG; Georgian: საქართველოს დემოკრატიული რესპუბლიკა, romanized: sakartvelos demok'rat'iuli resp'ublik'a) was the first modern establishment of a republic of Georgia, which existed from May 1918 to March 1921. Recognized by all major European powers of the time, DRG was created in the wake of the Russian Revolution of 1917, which led to the collapse of the Russian Empire and allowed territories formerly under Russia's rule to assert independence. In contrast to Bolshevik Russia, DRG was governed by a moderate, multi-party political system led by the Georgian Social Democratic Party (Mensheviks).

Initially, DRG was a protectorate of the German Empire. However, after the German defeat in World War I, the country was partially occupied by British troops, who were sent there to counter a proposed Bolshevik invasion. The British had to leave in 1920 because of the Treaty of Moscow, in which Russia recognized Georgia's independence in exchange for DRG not hosting forces hostile to Russia's interests. Now that Western European powers were no longer present in Georgia, in February 1921 the Bolshevik Red Army proceeded to invade the country, leading to DRG's defeat and collapse by March of that year, with Georgia becoming a Soviet republic. The Georgian Government, led by Prime Minister Noe Zhordania, moved to France where it continued to work in exile. The government-in-exile was recognized by France, Britain, Belgium, and Poland as the only legitimate government of Georgia until the 1930s, when growing Soviet power and political processes in Europe made it impractical to do so indefinitely.

Although short-lived, DRG continues to be an inspiration for modern-day Georgia due to its legacy of democracy and pluralism. It has been described as the world's "first social democratic state." DRG was one of the first countries in Europe to grant women the right to vote as enshrined in the Georgian constitution, which was "unusual in most European constitutions at the time". Several women of varying backgrounds were elected to the Georgian parliament, as were representatives of nine ethnicities, including Germans, Russians, Armenians, Azerbaijanis, and Jews. DRG also saw the founding of Georgia's first fully fledged university, thereby realizing a longstanding goal cherished by generations of Georgian intellectuals whose efforts were, up to that point, consistently frustrated by the Imperial Russian authorities.

== Background ==
Nikolay Chkheidze, president of the Georgian Provisional Assembly, later the Constituent Assembly

After the February Revolution of 1917 and collapse of the tsarist administration in the Caucasus, most powers were held by the Special Transcaucasian Committee (Ozakom, short for Osobyi Zakavkazskii Komitet) of the Russian Provisional Government. All of the soviets in Georgia were firmly controlled by the Georgian Social Democratic Party, who followed the lead of the Petrograd Soviet and supported the Provisional Government. The Bolshevist October Revolution changed the situation drastically. The Caucasian Soviets refused to recognize Vladimir Lenin's regime. Threats from the increasingly Bolshevistic deserting soldiers of the former Caucasus army, ethnic clashes and anarchy in the region forced Georgian, Armenian and Azerbaijani politicians to create a unified regional authority known as the Transcaucasian Commissariat (14 November 1917) and later a legislature, the Sejm (23 January 1918). On 22 April 1918, the Sejm – Nikolay Chkheidze was the president – declared the Transcaucasus an independent democratic federation with an executive Transcaucasian government chaired by Evgeni Gegechkori and later by Akaki Chkhenkeli.

Many Georgians, influenced by the ideas of Ilia Chavchavadze and other intellectuals from the late 19th century, insisted on national independence. A cultural national awakening was further strengthened by the restoration of the autocephaly of the Georgian Orthodox Church (12 March 1917) and the establishment of a national university in Tbilisi (1918). In contrast, the Georgian Mensheviks regarded independence from Russia as a temporary step against the Bolshevik revolution and considered calls for Georgia's independence chauvinistic and separatist. The union of Transcaucasus was short-lived though. Undermined by increasing internal tensions and by pressure from the German and Ottoman empires, the federation collapsed on 26 May 1918, when Georgia declared independence. Two days later both Armenia and Azerbaijan declared their independence as well.

== History ==
=== Recognition ===
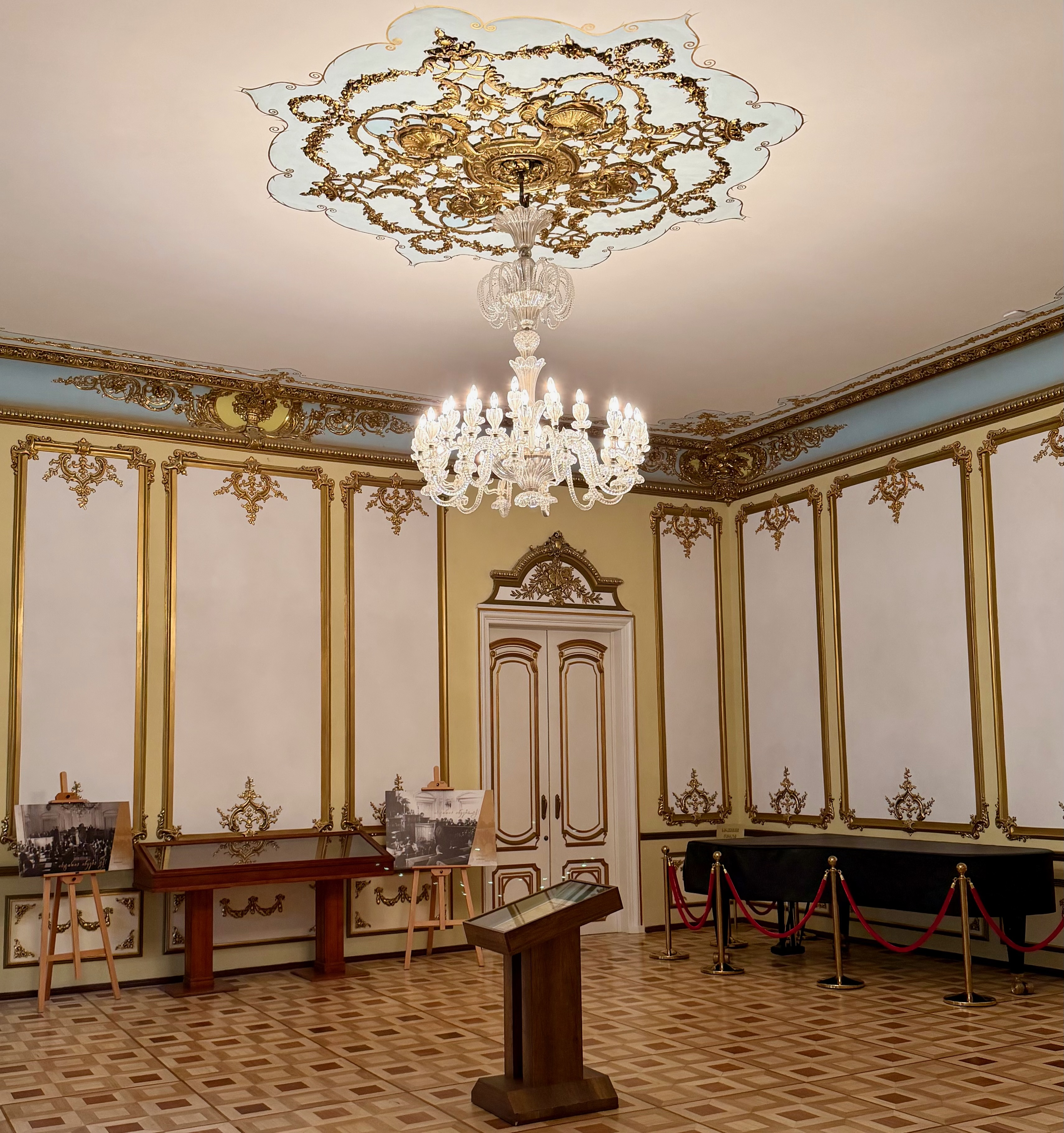
Hall in Tbilisi, where Georgia's independence was proclaimed in 1918

Georgia was immediately recognized by the German Empire, which was followed by the Ottoman Empire, Austria-Hungary, and Bulgaria. The young state had to place itself under German protection in the Treaty of Poti. German support enabled the Georgians to repel the Bolshevik threat from Abkhazia. German forces were almost certainly under the command of Friedrich Freiherr Kress von Kressenstein.

Following the German defeat in the First World War, British occupation forces arrived in the country, with the permission of the Georgian government. Relations between the British and the local population were more strained than they had been with the Germans. British-held Batumi remained out of Georgia's control until 1920. In December 1918, a British force was deployed in Tbilisi too.

Georgia's relations with its neighbors were uneasy. Territorial disputes with Armenia, Denikin's White Russian government and Azerbaijan led to armed conflicts in the first two cases. A British military mission attempted to mediate these conflicts in order to consolidate all anti-Bolshevik forces in the region. To prevent White Russian army forces from crossing into the newly established states, the British commander in the region drew a line across the Caucasus that Denikin would not be permitted to cross, giving both Georgia and Azerbaijan temporary relief. The threat of invasion by Denikin's forces, notwithstanding the British position, brought Georgia and Azerbaijan together in a mutual defense alliance on 16 June 1919.

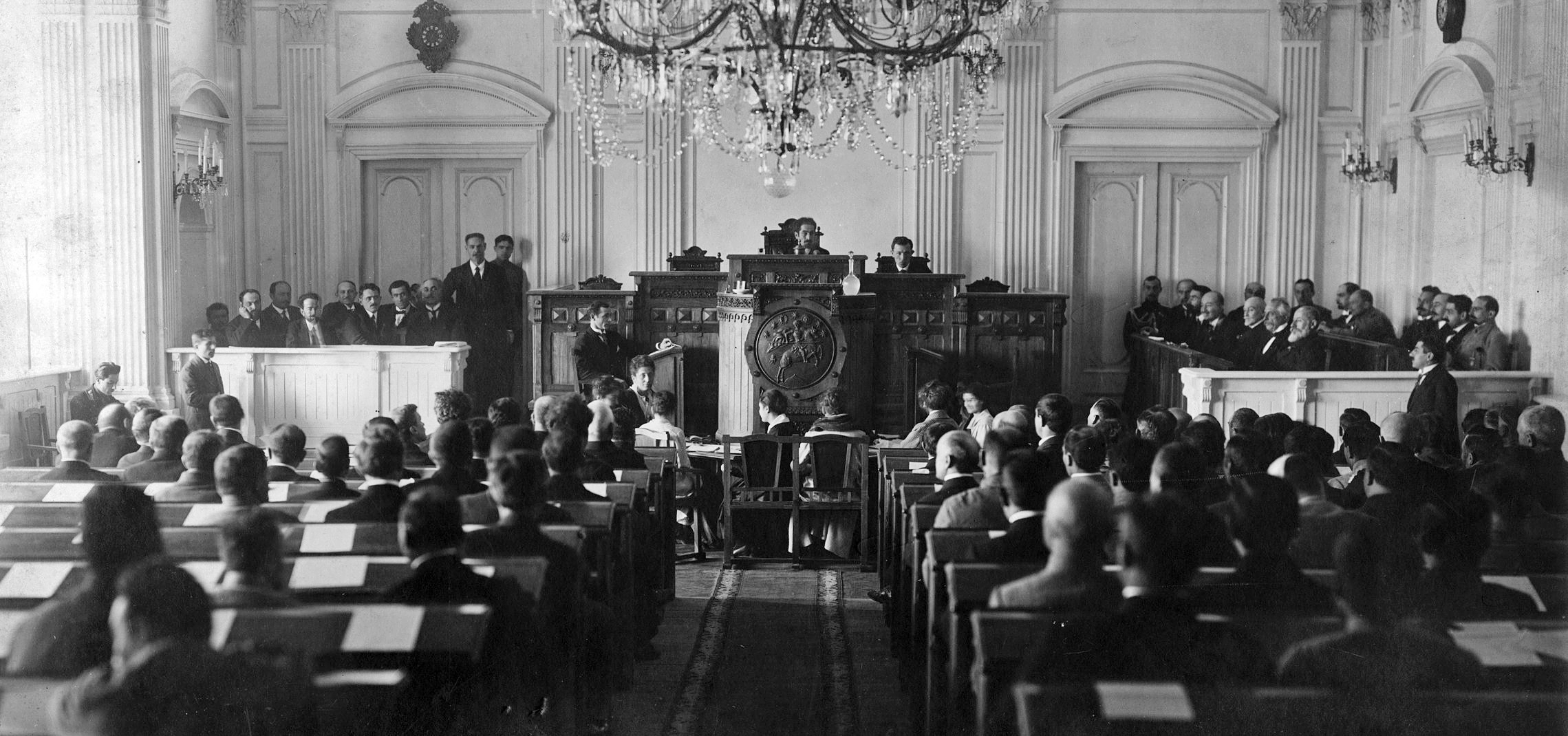
National Council meeting, 12 March 1919

On 14 February 1919, Georgia held parliamentary elections won by the Social Democratic Party of Georgia with 81.5% of the vote. On 21 March, Noe Zhordania formed the third government, which had to deal with armed peasants' revolts incited by local Bolshevik activists and largely supported by Russia. These became more troublesome when carried out by ethnic minorities such as Abkhazians and Ossetians.

However, the land reform was finally well handled by the Georgian Social Democratic Party government and the country established a multi-party system. In 1919, reforms in the judicial system and local self-governance were carried out. Abkhazia was granted autonomy. Nevertheless, ethnic issues continued to trouble the country, especially on the part of the Ossetians, as witnessed in May 1920. Nikolay Chkheidze proposed a white mandate for Georgia, vying to protect Georgia in event of an invasion by the Red Army. Many opposed him though. It is unknown whether or not the Kingdom of Italy wanted to place Georgia under its protection as a white mandate, but they were considering it. Nevertheless, Georgia did not become a mandate, resulting in the Red Army invasion of Georgia.

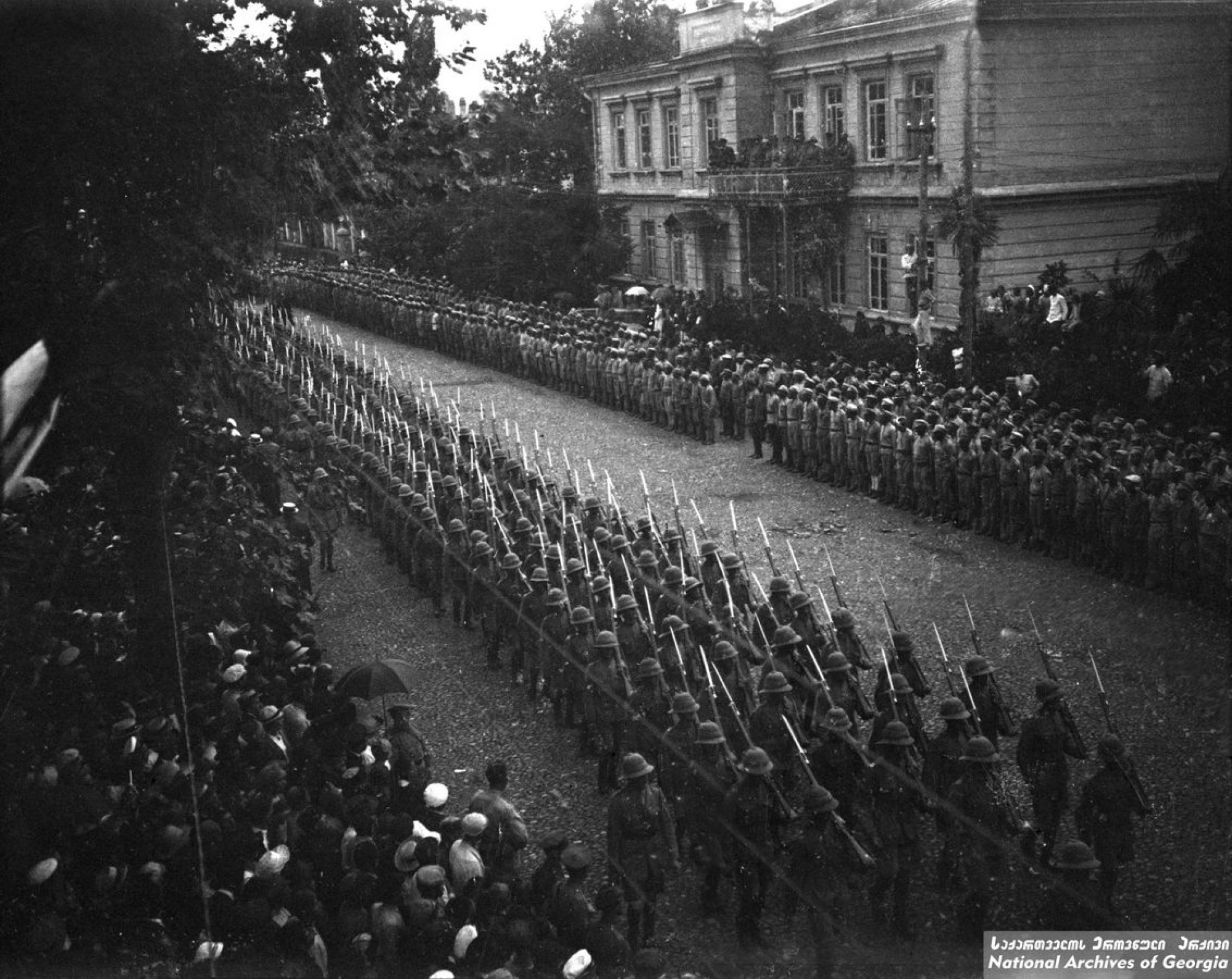
British troops marching in Batumi, 1920

=== Downfall ===
The year 1920 was marked by increased threats from the Russian SFSR. With the defeat of the White movement and the Red Armies' advance to the Caucasus frontiers, the republic's situation became extremely tense. In January, the Soviet leadership offered Georgia, Armenia and Azerbaijan an alliance against the White Army in South Russia and the Caucasus. The Government of the DRG refused to enter any military alliance, referring to its policy of neutrality and noninterference, but suggested negotiations towards a political settlement of the relations between two countries in the hope that this might lead to recognition of Georgia's independence by Moscow. Severe criticism of the Georgian refusal by Russian leaders was followed by several unsuccessful attempts by local communists to organize mass anti-government protests.

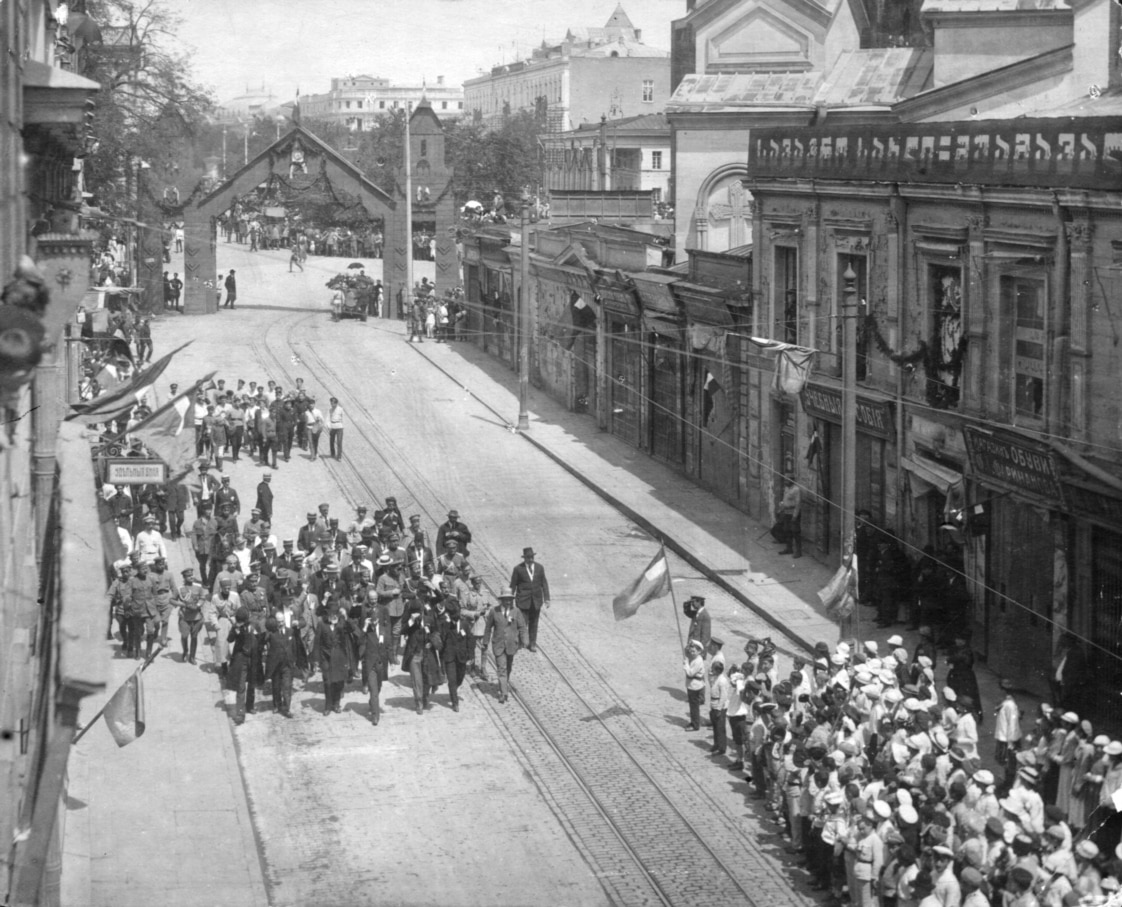
The leaders of the Second International visiting Tbilisi, 1918

In April 1920, the 11th Red Army established a Soviet regime in Azerbaijan, and the Georgian Bolshevik Sergo Orjonikidze requested permission from Moscow to advance into Georgia. Though official consent was not granted by Lenin and Sovnarkom, local Bolsheviks attempted to seize the Military School of Tbilisi as a preliminary to a coup d'état on 3 May 1920, but were successfully repelled by General Kvinitadze. The Georgian government began mobilization and appointed Giorgi Kvinitadze commander-in-chief. In the meantime, in response to Georgia's alleged provision of assistance to the Azeri nationalist rebellion in Ganja, Soviet forces attempted to penetrate Georgian territory, but were repelled by Kvinitadze in brief border clashes at the Red Bridge. Within a few days, peace talks resumed in Moscow. Under the terms of the controversial Moscow Peace Treaty of 7 May, Georgian independence was recognized in return for the legalization of Bolshevik organizations and a commitment not to allow foreign troops on Georgian soil.

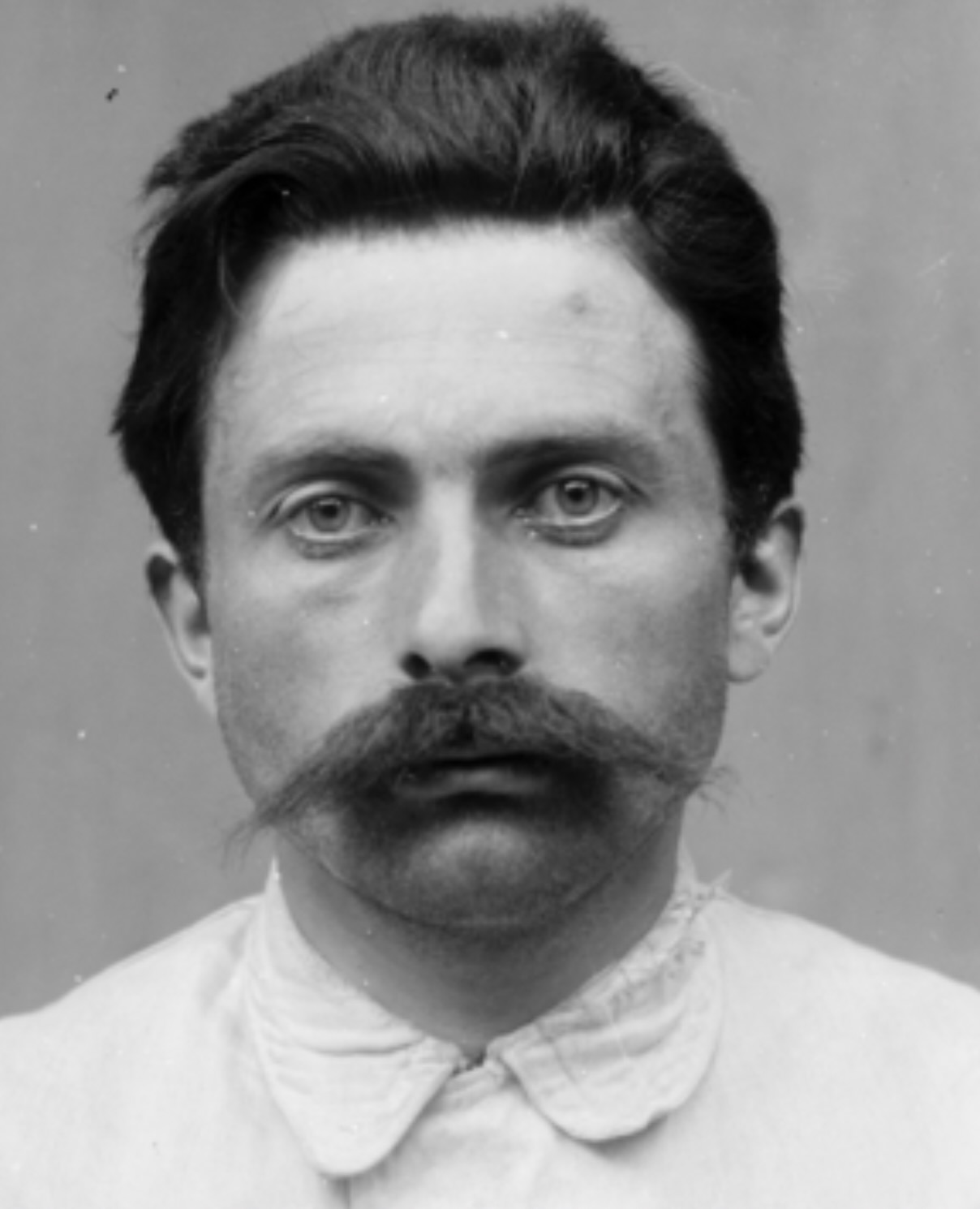
Sardion Tevzadze, member of parliament, was among numerous Georgian legislators executed by the Soviet regime

A vote at the League of Nations on granting membership to Georgia was held on 16 December 1920, with the resolution defeated: 10 voted for it, 13 against, and 19 abstained. Georgia gained de jure recognition from the Allies on 27 January 1921. This, however, did not prevent the country from being occupied by the Red Army a month later.

After Azerbaijan and Armenia had been Sovietized by the Red Army, Georgia found itself surrounded by hostile Soviet republics. Moreover, as the British had already evacuated the Caucasus, the country was left without any foreign support.

According to Soviet sources, relations with Georgia deteriorated over alleged violations of the peace treaty, re-arrests of Georgian Bolsheviks, obstruction of convoys passing through Georgia to Armenia, and a strong suspicion that Georgia was aiding armed rebels in the North Caucasus. For its part, Georgia accused Moscow of fomenting anti-government riots in various regions of the country, and of provoking border incidents in the Zaqatala region, disputed with the Azerbaijan Democratic Republic. The Lori "neutral zone" was another challenge, as Soviet Armenia categorically demanded that Georgia withdraw the troops that had been stationed in the region since the fall of the Armenian Republic.

== Government and law ==
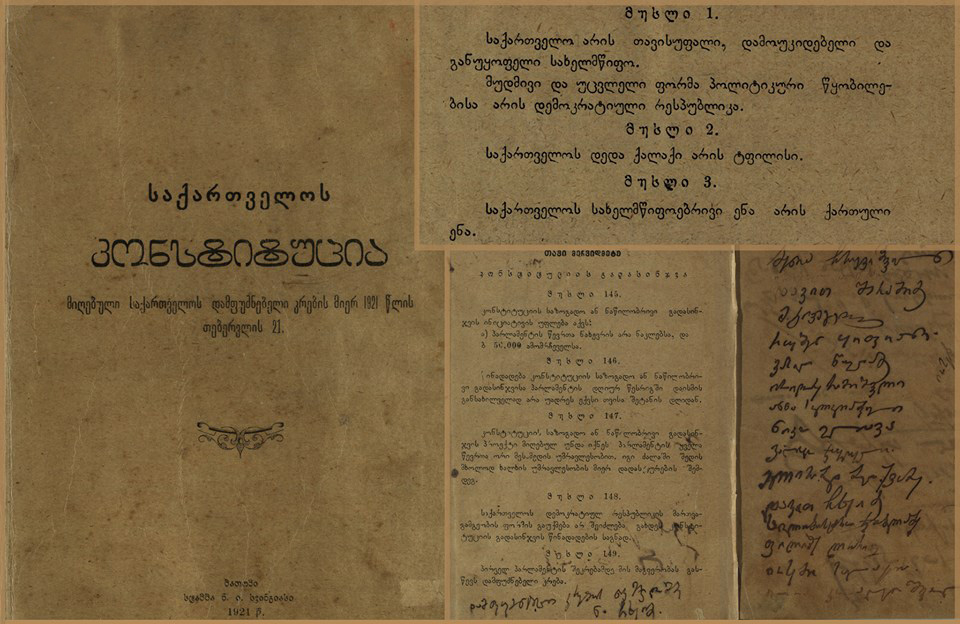
Fragments of the Constitution of Georgia adopted by the Constituent Assembly of Georgia on 21st February 1921

The Act of Independence of Georgia, declared on 26 May 1918, in brief, outlined the main principles of the nation's future democracy. According to this act, "the Democratic Republic of Georgia equally guarantees to every citizen within her limits political rights irrespective of nationality, creed, social rank or sex". The first government, formed the same day, was led by Noe Ramishvili. In October 1918, the National Council of Georgia has renamed the Parliament and announced new elections to be held on 14 February 1919.

During its two-year history (1919–1921), the newly elected Constituent Assembly of Georgia, with Nikolay Chkheidze as president, adopted 126 laws; these included laws on citizenship, local elections, defence, the official language, agriculture, the legal system, political and administrative arrangements for ethnic minorities (including an act about the People's Council of Abkhazia), a national system of public education, and some other laws and regulations on fiscal and monetary policy, railways, and trade and domestic production. On 21 February 1921, facing the onset of Soviet aggression, the Constituent Assembly adopted a constitution of the Democratic Republic of Georgia, the first modern fundamental law in the nation's history, placing emphasis on human rights. Georgia's constitution was regarded as highly progressive for its time and received international praise.

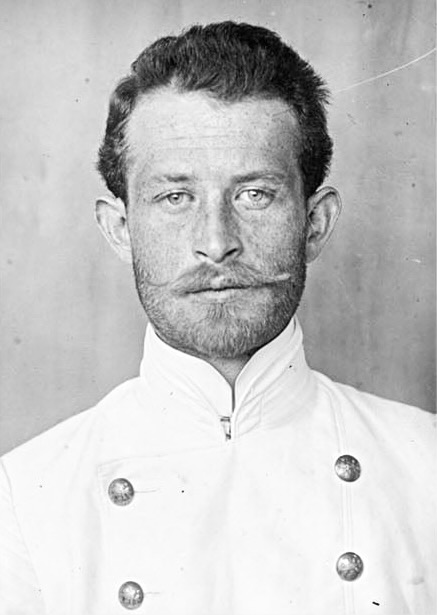
Samson Dadiani, one of the drafters of the 1919 constitution

The country was governed as a type of decentralized unitary parliamentary republic with an executive, with the constitution stating that "the state belongs to all the people. Parliament exercises the sovereignty of the nation within the framework of this constitution." The three decentralized regions included the Abkhaz Autonomy, the Autonomy of Muslim Georgia, and the Zaqatala Region, which were granted autonomy in local affairs.

The Chairman of the Government was the chief executive post, approved by the parliament for one-year terms of office (the post could not be held for more than two consecutive terms). The chairman appointed ministers and was responsible for governing the country and representing Georgia in foreign relations. However, the person in the position did not have some privileges common to dual-heads of state and heads of government, such as the ability to dissolve parliament or veto legislation.

The 1919 government of Georgia adopted a law on jury trials. The right to trial by jury for serious criminal, political and print cases was incorporated into the 1921 Constitution. The highest court was the Senate, indirectly elected by the parliament. Any changes to the constitution must have first been approved by 2/3 of the legislature, and then a majority of the voting public in a referendum. Noe Zhordania viewed the decentralisation of the DRG as giving a strong role to local, self-governing assemblies, erobas, that would share power with the national parliament.

== Territorial structure ==
During the Democratic Republic of Georgia, in accordance with the Project for dividing the territory of Georgia into new administrative units (regions), developed by the Self-Government Commission of the Constituent Assembly of the Democratic Republic of Georgia in 1920 (Publication of the Committee of the Union of the elected bodies of local self-government of Georgia No. 2, 1920 (State printing house), Tiflis. – 103 p.; National Library of the Parliament of Georgia, Archive Fund, F 7.876/4 – პროექტი საქართველოს ტერიტორიის დანაწილებისა ახალ საადმინისტრაციო ერთეულებად (ოლქებად)) the division into Governorates and Oblasts was eliminated, uezds and okrugs were preserved, renamed to regions. The names of the regions were mainly proposed by the names of their administrative centers. Minor changes were made to their borders and several former uezds and okrugs were united: Batumi and Artvin okrugs – into the Batumi region, Akhaltsikhe and Akhalkalaki uezds – into the Akhaltsikhe region, Dusheti and Tianet uezds into the Ananuri region. In addition, three autonomous entities were created: Abkhazian autonomy (Sukhumi region), Autonomy of Muslim Georgia (Batumi region) and Zagatala region. Two-level local self-government was introduced: 18 regions and equivalent to regions, the capital of Georgia – Tiflis (Tbilisi) at the regional level and 356 cities and communities at the local level. The southern part of the Ardahan district and the Olta district – if the Democratic Republic of Georgia establishes control over them, will be part of the created Artaani region.

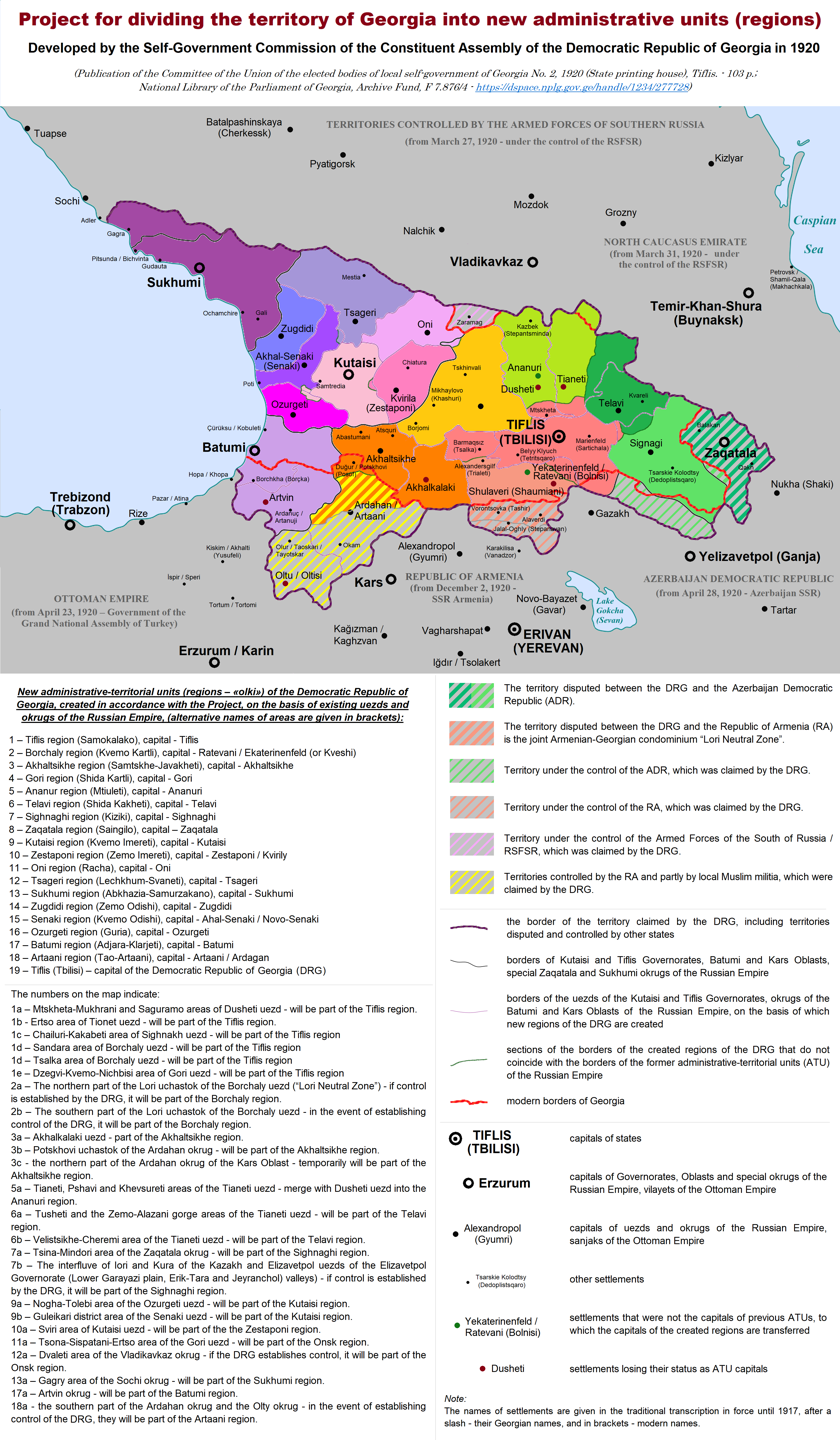
Project for dividing the territory of Georgia into new administrative units (regions), 1920.

New administrative-territorial units (regions – «olki») of the Democratic Republic of Georgia, created in accordance with the Project, on the basis of existing uezds and okrugs of the Russian Empire, (alternative names of areas are given in brackets):

1 – Tiflis region (Samokalako), capital – Tiflis

2 – Borchaly region (Kvemo Kartli), capital – Ratevani / Ekaterinenfeld (or Kveshi)

3 – Akhaltsikhe region (Samtskhe-Javakheti), capital – Akhaltsikhe

4 – Gori region (Shida Kartli), capital – Gori

5 – Ananur region (Mtiuleti), capital – Ananuri

6 – Telavi region (Shida Kakheti), capital – Telavi

7 – Sighnaghi region (Kiziki), capital – Sighnaghi

8 – Zaqatala region (Saingilo), capital – Zaqatala

9 – Kutaisi region (Kvemo Imereti), capital – Kutaisi

10 – Zestaponi region (Zemo Imereti), capital – Zestaponi / Kvirily

11 – Oni region (Racha), capital – Oni

12 – Tsageri region (Lechkhum-Svaneti), capital – Tsageri

13 – Sukhumi region (Abkhazia-Samurzakano), capital – Sukhumi

14 – Zugdidi region (Zemo Odishi), capital – Zugdidi

15 – Senaki region (Kvemo Odishi), capital – Ahal-Senaki / Novo-Senaki

16 – Ozurgeti region (Guria), capital – Ozurgeti

17 – Batumi region (Adjara-Klarjeti), capital – Batumi

18 – Artaani region (Tao-Artaani), capital – Artaani / Ardagan

19 – Tiflis (Tbilisi) – capital of the Democratic Republic of Georgia.

== International recognition ==
Map of the borders of the territory that was proposed by the Georgian delegation at the Paris Peace Conference of 1919 for inclusion in the Democratic Republic of Georgia, as well as the territories that after 1921 were part of neighboring states.

Under the terms of the Moscow Peace Treaty of 7 May, Georgian independence was recognized by Soviet Russia in return for the legalization of Bolshevik organizations and a commitment not to allow foreign troops on Georgian soil.

The independence of the Democratic Republic of Georgia was de jure recognized by Romania, Argentina, Germany, Turkey, Belgium, United Kingdom, France, Japan, Italy, Poland, Czechoslovakia, Siam and Estonia, among other countries.

The Government of the Democratic Republic of Georgia in Exile continued to be recognized by many European states as the only legal government of Georgia for some time after 1921. The Government of the Democratic Republic of Georgia in Exile lasted until 1954 continuing to oppose Soviet rule in Georgia.

== Political geography ==
Georgia's 1918–1921 borders were formed through the border conflicts with its neighbors and ensuing treaties and conventions.

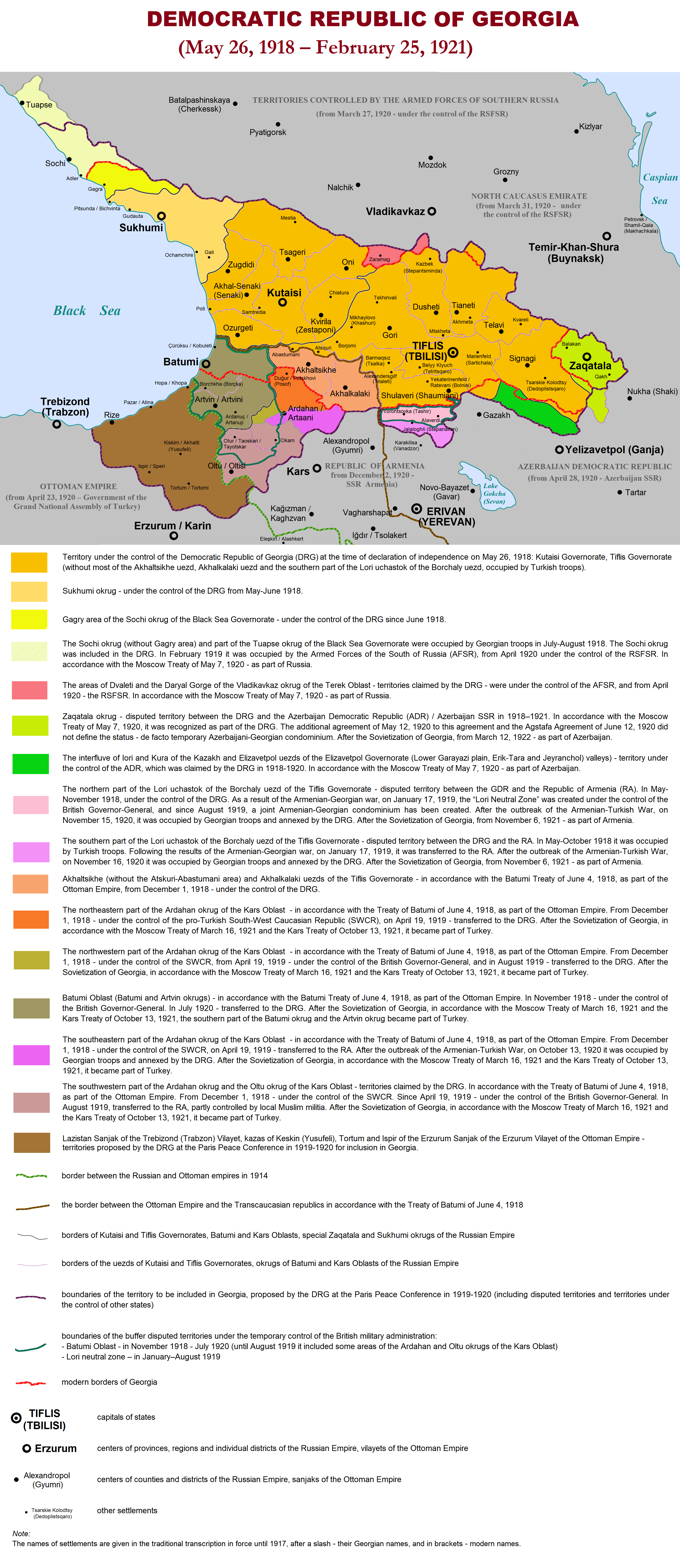
Map of changes in the territory of the Democratic Republic of Georgia in 1918–1921.

In the north, Georgia was bordered by various Russian Civil War polities until Bolshevik power was established in the North Caucasus in the spring of 1920. The international border between Soviet Russia and Georgia was regulated by the 1920 Moscow Treaty. During the Sochi conflict with the Russian White movement, Georgia briefly controlled the Sochi district in 1918–1919. In the southwest, the DRG's border with the Ottoman Empire changed with the course of World War I and was modified after the Ottoman defeat in the hostilities. Georgia regained control over Artvin, Ardahan, part of Batum province, Akhaltsikhe and Akhalkalaki. Batum was finally incorporated into the republic after the British evacuated the area in 1920.

The border disputes with the First Republic of Armenia over a part of Borchalo district led to a brief war between the two countries in December 1918. With the British intervention the Lori "neutral zone" was created, only to be reoccupied by Georgia after the fall of the Armenian Republic at the end of 1920.

In the southeast, Georgia was bordered by Azerbaijan, which claimed control of Zaqatala district. The dispute, however, never led to hostilities and relations between the two countries were generally peaceful until the Sovietization of Azerbaijan.

The 1919 projects and the 1921 constitution of Georgia granted Abkhazia, Ajaria and Zaqatala a degree of autonomy. Article 107 of the constitution gave autonomy to Abkhazia and Zaqatala. However, due to the Red Army invasion, the exact nature of this autonomy was never determined. It did however serve as the first time in the modern era that Abkhazia was defined as a geographic entity.

The territory of the Democratic Republic of Georgia included some territories that today belong to other countries. It was circa 107,600 km^{2}, compared to 69,700 km^{2} in modern Georgia. The Soviet occupation of the DRG led to significant territorial rearrangements by which Georgia lost almost a third of its territory. Artvin, Ardahan and part of Batumi provinces were ceded to Turkey, Armenia gained control of Lori, and Azerbaijan obtained Zaqatala district. A portion of the Georgian marches along the Greater Caucasus Mountains was taken by Russia.

== Demographics ==
Forming principally on the territories of the Tiflis and Kutais governorates, as well as the Batum Oblast and Sukhumi Okrug, the Georgian Democratic Republic following the Treaty of Batum consisted of 1,607,000 Georgians, 535,000 Armenians, 200,000 Muslims, and 510,000 others, totalling 2,852,000 inhabitants.

By 1921, following the fall of the Armenian and Azerbaijani republics and Georgia's reacquisition of the Lori and Zakatal districts, the population reached 2,677,000 according to a Soviet source, with an urban population of 475,000 (17.7%). This is supported by the results of the 1926 Soviet census in Georgia some 5 years later which indicated a population of 2,667,000, indicative of the loss of the aforementioned Lori and Zakatal districts to neighbouring Armenia and Azerbaijan respectively.

== Armed forces ==
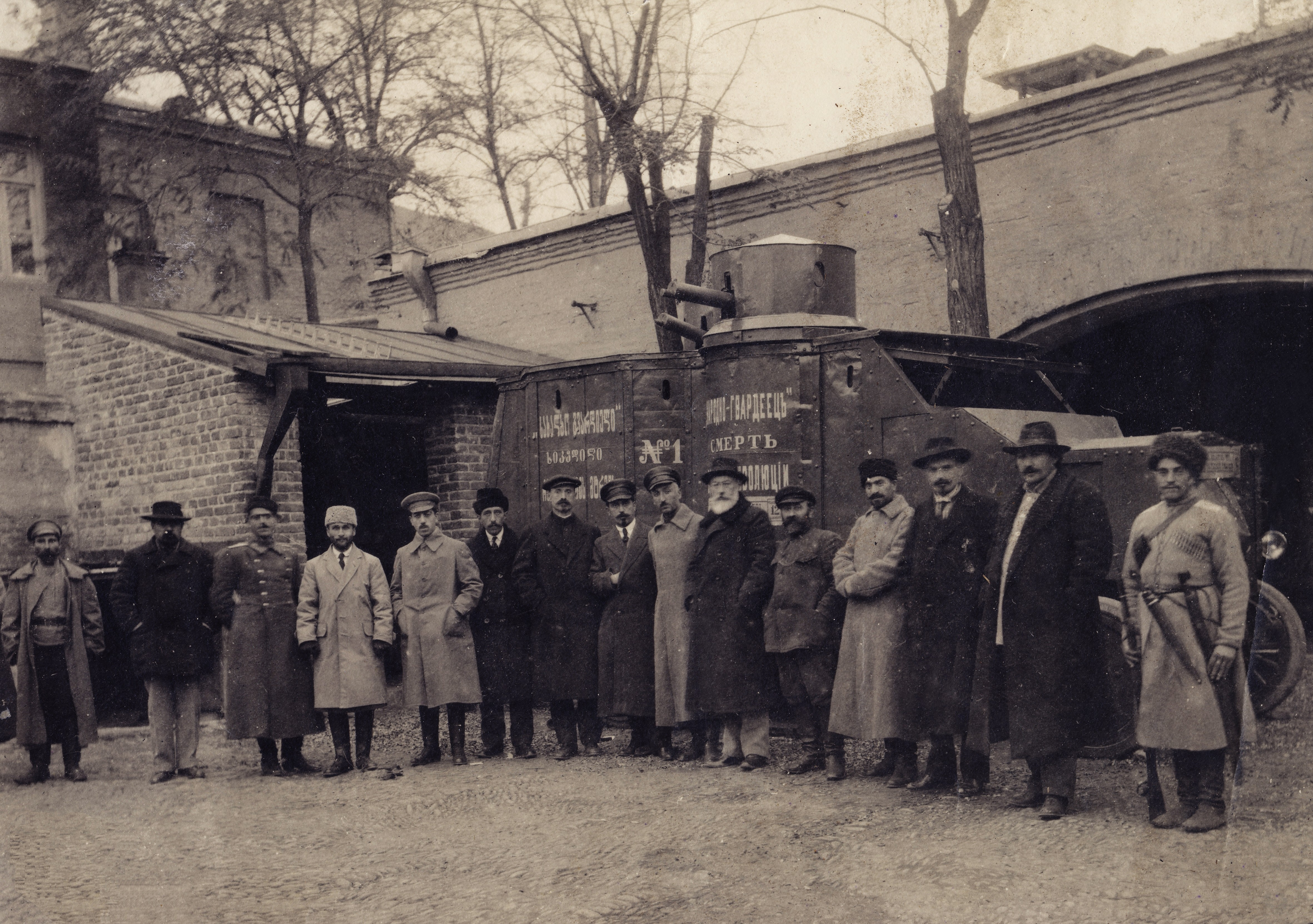
The chairmen of the Georgian government Noe Zhordania and the head of People's Guard Valiko Jugheli accompanied by a members of the People's Guard. Tbilisi, 1919-1920

The People's Guard was the privileged military force in the country. Founded on 5 September 1917, as the Worker's Guard, it was later renamed the Red Guard, and finally the People's Guard. It was a highly politicized military structure placed directly under the control of parliament rather than the Ministry of War. Throughout its existence (1917–1921), the Guard was under the command of the Menshevik activist Valiko Jugheli.

The DRG also formed its own regular army. The only part of it was armed in peacetime, the majority being on furlough and following their callings. If the republic had been in danger, they would have been called up by the General Staff, supplied with arms, and allotted to their places. General Giorgi Kvinitadze was commander-in-chief, two times.

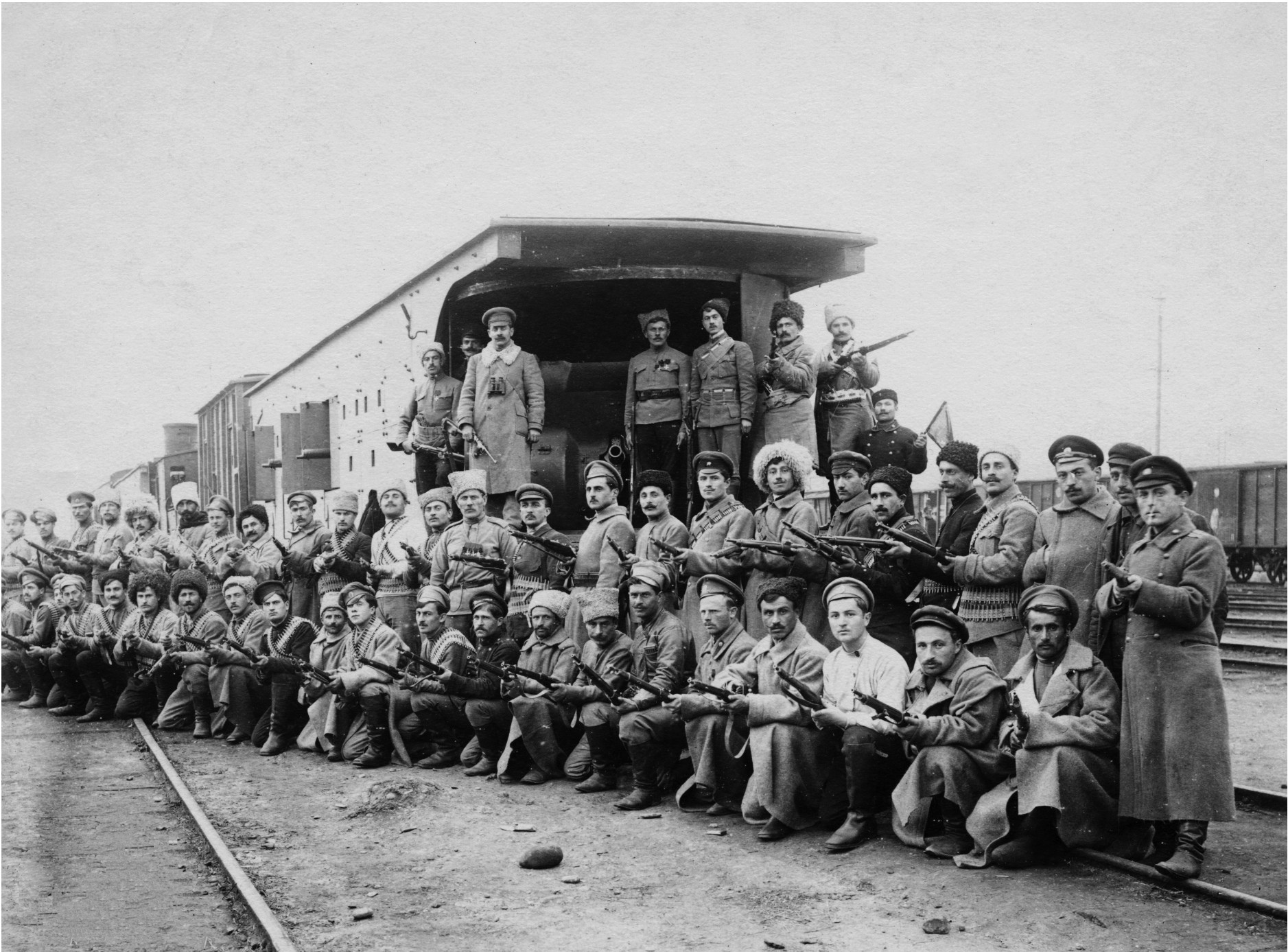
A Georgian armoured train named "Respublikeli" (Georgian for "Republican")

From March 1919 to October 1920, the Georgian army was reorganized. It consisted of 3 infantry brigades (later coalesced into one division), 1 cavalry brigade, 2 fortress regiments, 3 artillery brigades, a sapper battalion, a telegraph platoon, a motor squadron with an armored car detachment, a cavalry regiment, and a military school. A People's Guard consisted of 4 regular battalions. It could further mobilize 18 battalions, i.e., one division. Thus, in 1920, the Georgian army and People's Guard together comprised 16 infantry battalions (1 army division and an NG regiment), 1 sapper battalion, 5 field artillery divisions, 2 cavalry legions, 2 motor squadrons with 2 armored car detachments, an air detachment and 4 armored trains. Beyond staff and fortress regiments, the army totaled 27,000. Mobilization could increase this number to 87,000. The Georgian navy possessed 1 destroyer, 4 fighter aircraft, 4 torpedo boats, 4 mine sweepers, and 10 steamboats.

Although the republic had access to almost 200,000 veterans of World War I with skilled generals and officers, the government failed to build up an effective defense system, a factor that greatly contributed to its collapse.

== Economy ==
When the DRG was proclaimed, the Georgian economy was not in a strong position. While economic issues were a Europe-wide issue in 1918 (owing to the First World War), as a new state Georgia faced considerably more difficulties. There were two main issues immediately facing Georgia: economic dependence on Russia, and the need to industrialise a largely agrarian society. Further causing issues was a lack of direction from the Georgian government, which also tried to implement a socialist-based policy into economic matters, despite lacking the financial backing to keep the economy stable.

As part of the Russian Empire Georgia had been partially industrialised, with natural resource extraction becoming a major feature of exports from the region. However, as historian Stephen F. Jones has noted, imperial Russian policies served the metropolitan needs and imperial integration and there was no regional "strategy of economic development beyond state production of raw materials, the development of transport, military supplies and specialized crops such as tea, tobacco, and cotton." This was also seen on an ethnic scale: the overwhelming amount of traders and business-owners in Georgia were ethnic Armenian, while the administration was composed largely of ethnic Russians. Ethnic Georgians mainly remained in agriculture or took up unskilled labour positions in the cities. This division of labour between ethnic groups proved difficult to reconcile once the DRG was established, and in the aftermath of the Georgian–Armenian War in December 1918 anti-Armenian sentiment throughout Georgia made the Armenian-dominated business class reluctant to help implement needed changes to improve the economy.

Agriculture had been the dominant feature of the Georgian economy, and would remain as such throughout the existence of the DRG. Approximately 79% of the population worked on the land, though the methods used were outdated and far from efficient. This caused food shortages in the cities, and despite 81% of all arable land being used for grains, imports were also required, as was a ban on exporting food products like grain, fruits and vegetables.

The manganese industry at Chiatura was of great importance to European metallurgy, providing about 70% of the world supply of manganese in the early 20th century. Traditionally, Georgia served also as an international transportation corridor through the key Black Sea ports of Batumi and Poti. However the First World War had a devastating effect on this industry as well. The Black Sea had been blockaded throughout the war, severely limiting the amount of exports. This led to a drastic reduction in economic activity in Georgia: the workforce at Chiatura dropped from 3,500 in 1913 to 250 in 1919, with the numbers only starting to rise in 1920. Emerging markets in Brazil and India also meant that the Chiatura mines were less important on a global scale, further weakening their output.

The lack of international recognition and the government's only partially successful policy in the field hindered the economic development of the DRG and the country suffered an economic crisis. Some signs of improvement were observed towards 1920–1921.

== Education, science and culture ==
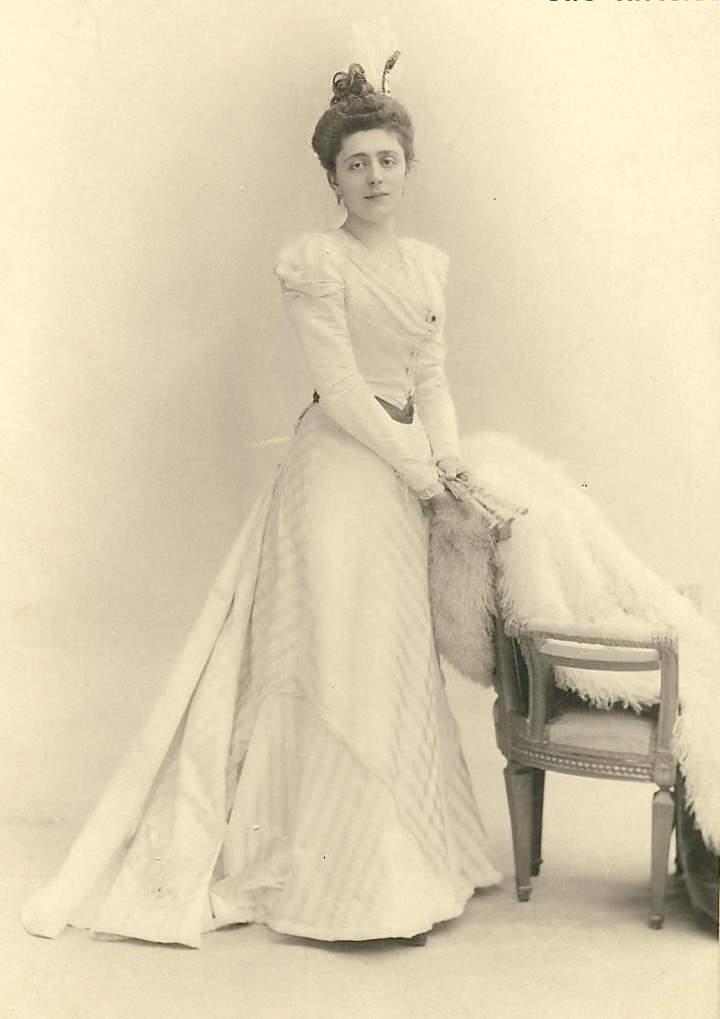
Elizabeth Orbeliani, first woman lecturer and co-founder of Georgia's first university.

The most important event in the country's cultural life during this turbulent period was indeed the foundation of a national university in Tbilisi (now known as the Tbilisi State University) (1918), a long-time dream of Georgians thwarted by the Imperial Russian authorities for several decades. Other educational centers included gymnasiums in Tbilisi, Batumi, Kutaisi, Ozurgeti, Poti and Gori, Tbilisi Military School, Gori Pedagogical Seminary, the Pedagogical Seminary for Women, etc. Georgia also had a number of schools for ethnic minorities.

The National Museum of Georgia, theaters in Tbilisi and Kutaisi, the Tbilisi National Opera House, and the National Academy of Art were in the vanguard of cultural life.

The newspapers Sakartvelos Respublika ("Republic of Georgia"), Sakartvelo ("Georgia"), Ertoba ("Unity"), Samshoblo ("Motherland"), Sakhalkho Sakme ("Public Affair"), The Georgian Messenger and The Georgian Mail (both published in English) led the national press.

== Legacy ==
The 1918–1921 independence of Georgia, though short-lived, was of particular importance for the development of national feeling among Georgians, a major factor that made the country one of the most active independent forces within the Soviet Union. Leaders of the national movement of the late 1980s frequently referred to the DRG as a victory in the struggle against the Russian Empire and drew parallels with the contemporary political situation, portraying a somewhat idealized image of the Georgian First Republic.

On 9 April 1991, the independence of Georgia was restored when the Act of the Restoration of State Independence of Georgia was adopted by the Supreme Council of the Republic of Georgia. The national symbols used by the DRG were re-established as those of the newly independent nation and remained in use until 2004. 26 May, the day of the establishment of the DRG, is still celebrated as a national holiday – the Independence Day of Georgia.

== See also ==
- 1920 Gori earthquake
- Aftermath of World War I
- August Uprising
- Azerbaijan Democratic Republic
- Kars Oblast
- List of people associated with the Democratic Republic of Georgia
- List of historical states of Georgia

== Bibliography ==
- Avalishvili, Zourab (1981), The Independence of Georgia in International Politics 1918–1921, Westport, Connecticut: Hyperion Press, ISBN 0-8305-0059-6
- Blauvelt, Timothy K. (2014), "The Establishment of Soviet Power in Abkhazia: Ethnicity, Contestation and Clientalism in the Revolutionary Periphery", Revolutionary Russia, 27 (1): 22–46, doi:10.1080/09546545.2014.904472, S2CID 144974460
- Jones, Stephen (2014), "Between ideology and pragmatism: social democracy and the economic transition in Georgia 1918–21", Caucasus Survey, 1 (2): 63–81, doi:10.1080/23761199.2014.11417286
- Kazemzadeh, Firuz (1951), The Struggle for Transcaucasia (1917–1921), New York City: Philosophical Library, ISBN 978-0-95-600040-8
- Lee, Eric (2017), The Experiment: Georgia's Forgotten Revolution, 1918–1921, London: Zed Books, ISBN 978-1-78699-092-1
- Papuashvili, George (2012), "The 1921 Constitution of the Democratic Republic of Georgia: Looking Back after Ninety Years", European Public Law, 18 (2): 323–350, doi:10.54648/EURO2012018, S2CID 141680095
- Rayfield, Donald (2012), Edge of Empires: A History of Georgia, London: Reaktion Books, ISBN 978-1-78-023030-6
- Rose, John D. (April 1980), "Batum as Domino, 1919–1920: The Defence of India in Transcaucasia", The International History Review, 2 (2): 266–287, doi:10.1080/07075332.1980.9640214
- Suny, Ronald Grigor (1994), The Making of the Georgian Nation (Second ed.), Bloomington, Indiana: Indiana University Press, ISBN 978-0-25-320915-3
- Welt, Cory (2012), "A Fateful Moment: Ethnic Autonomy and Revolutionary violence in the Democratic Republic of Georgia (1918–1921)", in Jones, Stephen F. (ed.), The Making of Modern Georgia, 1918 – 2012: The first Georgian Republic and its successors, New York City: Routledge, pp. 205–231, ISBN 978-0-41-559238-3
- Yilmaz, Harun (2009), "An Unexpected Peace: Azerbaijani-Georgian Relations, 1918–1920", Revolutionary Russia, 22 (1): 37–67, doi:10.1080/09546540902900288, S2CID 143471218
- Lortkipanidze, Mariam; Japaridze, Otar; Muskhelishvili, David; Metreveli, Roin (2012). History of Georgia in four volumes, vol. IV – History of Georgia from the 19th century to the 20th century. Tbilisi: National Academy of Sciences of Georgia. ISBN 978-9941-19-408-5.
