= Georgian Socialist-Federalist Revolutionary Party =

Former political party in Georgia

Georgian Socialist-Federalist Revolutionary Party საქართველოს სოციალისტ-ფედერალისტთა სარევოლუციო პარტია
- Leader: Iosif Baratashvili
- Founded: April 1904
- Dissolved: September 1924
- Newspaper: Sakartvelo
- Ideology: Left-wing nationalism Democratic socialism Federalism
- Political position: Left-wing
- Constituent Assembly of Georgia: 8 / 130

The Georgian Socialist-Federalist Revolutionary Party (Georgian: საქართველოს სოციალისტ-ფედერალისტთა სარევოლუციო პარტია, romanized: sakartvelos sotsialist'-pederalist'ta sarevolutsio p'art'ia) was a Georgian nationalist party, founded in April 1904. The party's program demanded the national autonomy of Georgia from the Russian Empire under a democratic socialist system, which was seen as a stepping stone to achieving Georgia's full independence from Russia.

Mainly based in the rural areas, the party's membership was almost entirely drawn from the peasantry and the petty gentry. The political profile of the party had an appeal amongst moderately nationalist intellectuals, schoolteachers and students. The party strived that agricultural issues not be decided by central authorities, but by autonomous national institutions. The party published the periodical Sakartvelo (the Georgian term for "Georgia").

== History ==
According to Boris Souvarine, the party accepted arms from Japan to fight against the Russian state during the Russo-Japanese war. The party was one of very few oppositional groups in the Russian empire to accept such aid.

The party conducted a series of robberies in the Caucasus. In April 1906, it managed to rob the Dusheti treasury, taking a bounty of at least 315,000 rubles. The bulk of the stolen money allegedly stayed with Leo Keresselidze, the organizer of the robbery, who took it with him as he went into exile. However, at least 100,000 were disbursed to the moderate wing of the party and largely spent on publishing literature. Not everyone within the party was content with how the funds were distributed, which was apparently what led to the organizers of the robbery being reported to the Tsarist gendarmerie in Tiflis.

In November 1904, the party took part in a conference of oppositional groups in Paris, where the 'Paris agreement' of struggle against autocracy was adopted. The party was represented at the conference by Dekanozov and Gabuniya. Other participating organizations were the Socialist-Revolutionary Party, the Polish Socialist Party, the Polish National League, the Finnish Party of Active Resistance, the Latvian Social Democratic Workers Party, the Armenian Revolutionary Federation, the Union of Liberation. The conference adopted a declaration called for the establishment of a democratic regime in Russia (although not specifying if it was to be monarchic or republican), but could not agree on the formation of a joint central bureau for the oppositional forces. In April 1905, the Socialist-Federalists, the Socialist Union of White Russia and several of the groups that had participated in the Paris conference (Armenian Revolutionary Federation, Socialist-Revolutionaries, Finnish Party of Active Resistance, Latvian Social Democratic Workers Union) met in Geneva and formed the General Fighting Committee, striving to establish constituent assemblies for Russia, Poland and Finland.

In the first Duma election, the Socialist-Federalist Iosif Baratov won a seat from Tiflis. The party had formed an electoral bloc ahead of the polls, together with the Georgian Democratic Party and the Radical Party. Later, the party was able to capture the majority seats from Georgia in the Second Duma.

In 1907, the party adopted the policy of extraterritorial national-cultural autonomy, that an individual would enjoy cultural and national autonomy no matter where in the Empire they would reside.

After the 1917 October Revolution, the party formed an anti-Soviet bloc along with the Georgian Mensheviks, the Armenian Revolutionary Federation ("Dashnaks") and the Azeri Musavat Party. The bloc received support from Central Powers, and later, by the Entente. In the 1917 Russian Constituent Assembly election, the list of the party obtained 22,754 votes (0.93% of the votes in the Transcaucasus electoral district). After the Georgian independence, the party received 6,66% of the vote and 8 seats in the 1919 Georgian parliamentary election.

The party later formed the Committee for Independence of Georgia with the National Democrats and Mensheviks, and attempted to launch an armed uprising against Soviet power in October 1923.

== See also ==
- Samson Dadiani
- Leo Kereselidze
