= 1919 Georgian parliamentary election =

- 14-16 February 1919

All 130 seats in the Constituent Assembly 66 seats needed for a majority
- Registered: 876 910
- Turnout: 57.64%

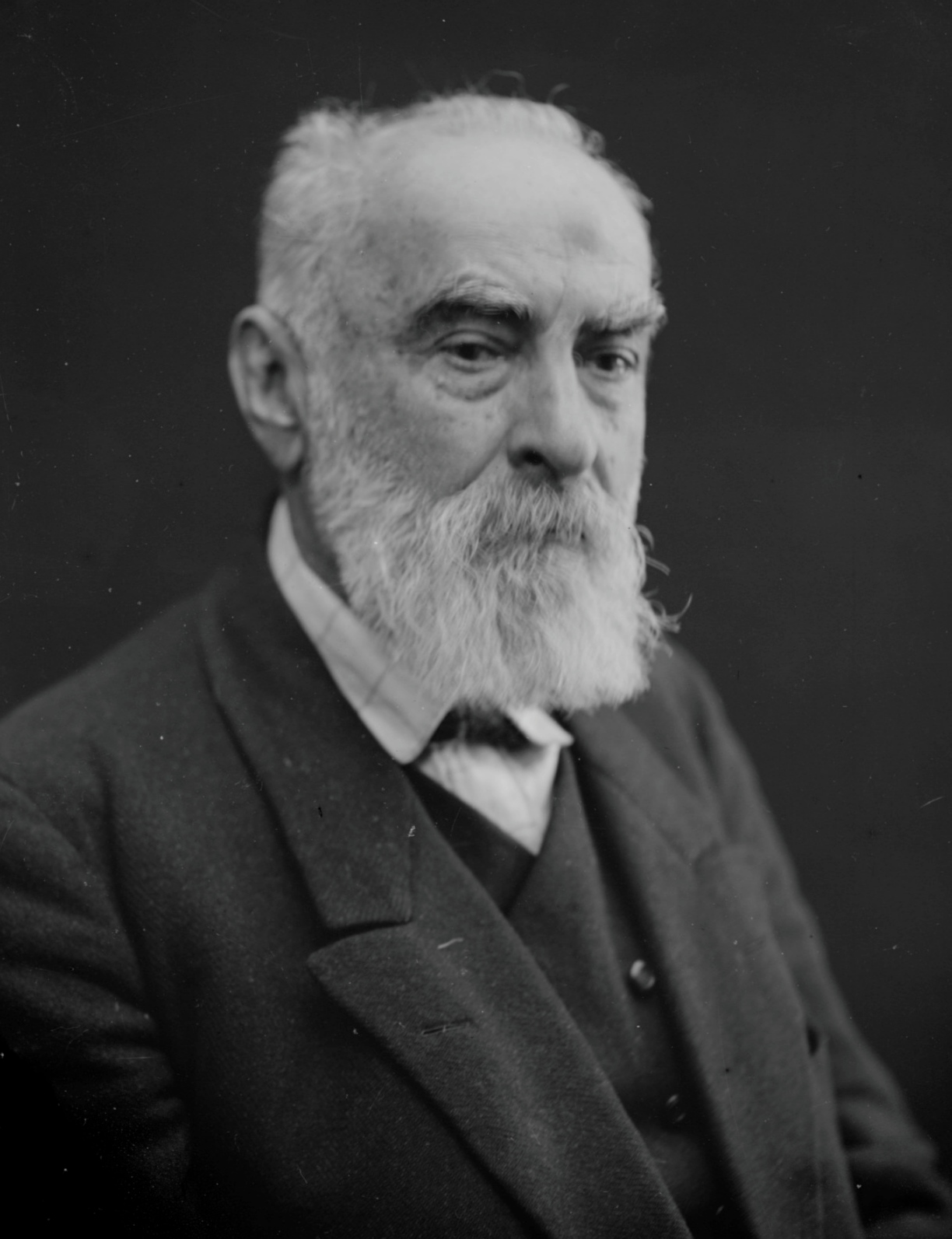

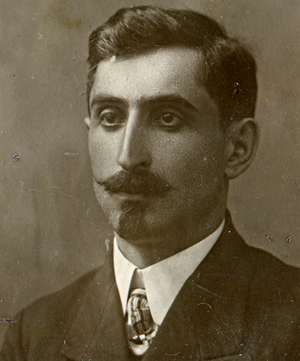
| | Majority party | Minority party |
|---|---|---|
| Leader | Noe Jordania | Giorgi Laskhishvili |
| Party | SSDP | SSPSP |
| Seats won | 109 | 8 |
| Popular vote | 409,766 | 33,721 |
| Percentage | 80.96% | 6.66% |
| | Third party | Fourth party |
| Leader | Niko Nikoladze | Leo Shengeia |
| Party | SEDP | SSRP |
| Seats won | 8 | 5 |
| Popular vote | 30,754 | 21,453 |
| Percentage | 6.08% | 4.24% |
Chairman after election
Noe Jordania
SSDP

Constituent Assembly elections were held in the Democratic Republic of Georgia between 14 and 16 February 1919. The electoral system used was party-list proportional representation using the D'Hondt method in a single nationwide district. The result was a victory for the Social Democratic Party of Georgia, which won 81% of the vote, and 109 of the 130 seats. In by-elections held in spring, they lost four seats and the Armenian Party in Georgia–Dashnaktsitiuni and the Georgian National Party both won seats.

Following the election, the Constituent Assembly approved and ratified the Act of Independence on 12 March.

== Results ==
| Party | Votes | % | Seats |
|---|---|---|---|
| Social Democratic Party of Georgia | 409,766 | 80.96 | 109 |
| Georgian Socialist-Federalist Revolutionary Party | 33,721 | 6.66 | 8 |
| National Democrats of Georgia | 30,754 | 6.08 | 8 |
| Socialist-Revolutionary Party of Georgia | 21,453 | 4.24 | 5 |
| Radical-Democratic Party of Georgia | 3,107 | 0.61 | 0 |
| Armenian Party in Georgia–Dashnaktsitiuni | 2,353 | 0.46 | 0 |
| Left Socialist-Federalist Party | 1,616 | 0.32 | 0 |
| Georgian National Party | 1,532 | 0.30 | 0 |
| Union of Non-Party Independents | 795 | 0.16 | 0 |
| Russian Social Democratic Labour Party | 779 | 0.15 | 0 |
| Group of Muslims from Borchalo District | 77 | 0.02 | 0 |
| National Council of Muslims | 60 | 0.01 | 0 |
| Party of Noble Aestheticians | 53 | 0.01 | 0 |
| Party of Rustaveli Group | 51 | 0.01 | 0 |
| Democratic Group of Georgian Hellenes | 14 | 0.00 | 0 |
| Total | 506,131 | 100.00 | 130 |
Source: Nohlen et al.
