= National Democrats of Georgia =

Georgian National Democratic Party საქართველოს ეროვნულ-დემოკრატიული პარტია
- Leader: Spiridon Kedia
- Founded: 1917
- Dissolved: 1923
- Ideology: Georgian nationalism
- Political position: Centre-right
- Constituent Assembly of Georgia: 8 / 130

The Georgian National Democratic Party (Georgian: საქართველოს ეროვნულ-დემოკრატიული პარტია, romanized: sakartvelos erovnul-demok'rat'iuli p'art'ia) was a centre-right Georgian nationalist party, between 1917 and 1923. In the 1919 Georgian parliamentary election, the party received 6.08% of the vote, garnering 8 of the 130 seats.

== Program ==
The party represented the interests of the nobility, bourgeoisie, intelligentsia, clergy and military circles. The National Democratic Party demanded the abolition of private ownership of land and criticized the land reform of the Social Democratic government. They also opposed state intervention in the market economy. The National Democrats opposed the parallel existence of two structures of the armed forces, the Army of the Democratic Republic of Georgia and the People's Guard, and demanded their unification. They also had a different attitude towards the Georgian Orthodox Church.
