= Abkhazia conflict (1918) =

Armed conflict in Abkhazia in 1918

Abkhazian conflict
- Part of the Caucasus campaign of World War I and the Southern Front of the Russian Civil War
- A map of the conflict region
Date	16 February 1918 – 10 October 1918
Location	Abkhazia (Sukhumi okrug)
Result	Georgian victory

Belligerents
Transcaucasian Commissariat (until 22 April 1918); Transcaucasian Federation (until 26 May 1918) (Georgia (country)) Georgia: Abkhaz People's Council; Supported by: German Empire (Note: German troops did not participate directly in the fighting, although they garrisoned parts of Abkhazia after they came under Georgian control and carried out a diversionary landing operation on the Taman Peninsula.) (since 28 May 1918)	Russian Soviet Republic: Abkhaz Bolsheviks; Kuban-Black Sea Soviet Republic	Ottoman Empire; Mountainous Republic of the Northern Caucasus / Pro-Ottoman/North Caucasian deputies of the Abkhaz People's Council (Russia) White movement

Commanders and leaders
(Georgia (country)) Valiko Jugheli (Georgia (country)) Giorgi Mazniashvili (Georgia (country)) Varlam Shervashidze	Yakov Antonov; Efrem Eshba; Nestor Lakoba	(Ottoman Empire) Yusuf Izzet Pasha (Ottoman Empire) Jamal-Bey Marshan; Aleksandr Sharvashidze

Units involved
People's Guard of Georgia; Georgian Regular Army; Abkhaz cavalry	Kiarazs; North Caucasian volunteers	Turkish Abkhazian volunteers

The Abkhazian conflict was an armed conflict in Abkhazia involving the Georgian Democratic Republic, the Russian Soviet Republic, and the Ottoman Empire. It consisted of a series of Bolshevik uprisings and an Ottoman military intervention, both of which were ultimately defeated by Georgian forces.

== Background ==
By the time of the collapse of the Russian Empire, the population of the multiethnic region of Abkhazia was divided in its political views and visions for the future of the region. The ethnic Georgian population, with the exception of a small number of Bolsheviks and anarchists, generally wished to become part of Georgia. Armenians, Russians, Greeks, Germans, and Estonians residing in Abkhazia generally preferred to remain part of Russia; however, the Bolshevik Revolution and the Red Terror led many of them to reorient themselves toward the new state formations emerging in the Caucasus, including the Transcaucasian Federation and Georgia.

Among ethnic Abkhazians, political preferences were mixed. Abkhazians in the Kodori sector, who lived in ethnically mixed areas alongside Georgians and shared the Orthodox Christian faith with them, with many also having Georgian roots, tended to associate themselves with Transcaucasia and Georgia. However, Abkhaz rural communities in the Gudauta sector, where approximately half of the population was Sunni Muslim, had pro-Russian, pro-Turkish, or pro-North Caucasian orientations.

The educated stratum generally leaned toward Georgia, while much of the Abkhaz landowning aristocracy feared the Social Democratic (Menshevik) policies of Georgia, including possible land reform, and sought assistance from the Ottoman Empire. There was, however, little support for Abkhaz independence. Additionally, due to its strategic location, Abkhazia served as a bridgehead for establishing control over the South Caucasus, and various forces, including White Russia, Soviet Russia, and the Ottoman Empire, competed with Georgia for control over the region.

== Conflict ==
After the February Revolution, the Sukhumi District Committee for Public Security was established under the leadership of Prince Aleksandr Sharvashidze as the governing body of Sukhumi Okrug. Following the October Revolution, however, the Abkhaz People's Council, chaired by Simon Basaria, became the representative body of Abkhazia, although it was unelected.

In early 1918, Lenin and Trotsky sought to establish Soviet power in the South Caucasus. A major offensive was being organized from Baku, where the Bolsheviks held power, while an auxiliary offensive was planned from Soviet-controlled Novorossiysk through Sukhumi. In February 1918, while the authorities in the region proceeded cautiously on the land question, the Bolsheviks, based in Gudauta, where they dominated the local administrative bodies, launched a rebellion and called for radical land reform, gaining support among Gudauta's local peasantry. On 16 February, Russian warships arriving from Trabzon with Bolshevik-aligned revolutionary soldiers aboard entered Sokhumi. Following a clash between the sailors and local nobles, the Bolsheviks seized control of Sokhumi with the support of the Russian ships, dissolved the "counterrevolutionary" Abkhaz People's Council, and established a Military Revolutionary Committee chaired by the local Bolshevik Efrem Eshba. However, after the departure of the warships, the city's authorities were reconstituted on 21 February. With the assistance of local Georgian units and the Abkhaz squadron of the former "Savage Division", the Bolsheviks were defeated and retreated to Gudauta, while the Abkhaz People's Council regained control.

However, the Red Army soon reached the Sukhumi Okrug, and the Sochi Red Guard, under the command of Nikifor Poyarko, entered Gudauta on 11 March. In late March, the Gudauta forces launched a more successful offensive, and on 8 April 1918, they entered Sukhumi and seized control of most of Abkhazia, except for the Kodor District, where local nobles retained control. The Abkhaz People's Council was subsequently declared dissolved. On 8 May, the Soviet of Workers' and Peasants' Deputies of Sukhumi adopted a resolution calling for the okrug to join the Russian Soviet Republic. Anti-Bolshevik militias withdrew to Gulripshi, while the Military Revolutionary Committee requested additional troops from Soviet Kuban to launch an offensive toward Kutaisi and Tiflis. The Abkhaz People's Council appealed to the Transcaucasian authorities for assistance, prompting the dispatch of the Georgian People's Guard and Georgian Corps to Abkhazia under the command of Valiko Jugheli and Aleksandr Koniashvili. They were joined by local Greek militias from Shroma. After four days of fighting near Dranda, the Bolsheviks were defeated on 20 May. The Abkhaz People's Council was subsequently reinstated and reaffirmed Abkhazia's association with the Transcaucasian Federation, proclaimed on 22 April. The Bolshevik forces retreated to Gagra. Soviet Kuban was unable to provide additional assistance because it was engaged in fighting the Volunteer Army, which had completed the First Kuban Campaign by mid-May.

The Georgian forces soon withdrew from Abkhazia to quash another Bolshevik rebellion in Dusheti District, leaving only a small garrison in Gudauta. On 26 May 1918, Georgia declared independence from the Transcaucasian Federation, which was dissolved a few days later. On 28 May, the Treaty of Poti was signed, under which Germany agreed to provide military assistance to Georgia and recognized Georgian rights over Abkhazia. Soviet Russia, however, recognized neither Georgia's independence nor its right to receive German assistance and, in response, launched a new offensive from Gagra in June 1918. The Bolshevik offensive coincided with the Ottoman advance toward Tiflis by the 3rd Ottoman Army, in violation of the peace treaty concluded in Batum between the Ottomans and the Transcaucasian states on 4 June. The Ottoman government officially denied involvement, claiming that the military operations were being conducted by "Muslim rebels of Georgia." With Georgia concentrating its forces around Tiflis, the Kuban and Black Sea Soviet forces advanced with little resistance, coordinating their operations with the advance of the Baku Commune toward Ganja and possibly Tiflis. The local Bolsheviks launched another rebellion in Gudauta and prepared to advance on Sokhumi, reinforced by approximately 2,000 volunteers from the Kuban-Black Sea Soviet Republic in the North Caucasus. On 6 June, Red forces under the command of Yakov Antonov overwhelmed the small Georgian detachments remaining in Abkhazia and captured Novy Afon, threatening Sukhumi. The Abkhaz People's Council appealed to Tiflis for urgent assistance. On 11 June, the Abkhaz People's Council signed a treaty providing for the incorporation of Abkhazia into the newly established Georgian Democratic Republic. Georgian army units under the command of General Giorgi Mazniashvili were subsequently deployed by sea from Poti to Sokhumi, as Bolshevik rebellions had broken out in the counties of Senaki and Zugdidi.

A Georgian force under Major General Giorgi Mazniashvili was deployed to the region and joined by an Abkhaz cavalry unit provided by the Abkhaz People's Council. On 13 June, a small German force landed on the Taman Peninsula, diverting the Kuban–Black Sea Red Army forces from the Sukhumi Okrug. On 19 June, Mazniashvili's contingent of 500 Georgian infantrymen and 300 Abkhaz cavalrymen from the former Savage Division joined the fighting around Gudauta and Novy Afon, which had been underway since 17 June. On 22 June, the Georgian-Abkhaz forces captured Gudauta, followed by Gagra on 28 June, reaching the Psou River. They subsequently continued their advance into the Sochi Okrug. The Second Kuban Campaign of the White Army, which began on 22 June, further complicated the position of the Red forces between the Kuban River and the Black Sea, leaving Antonov with little prospect of receiving reinforcements beyond a small contingent from Maykop. Meanwhile, the Georgian forces received additional reinforcements and were joined by hundreds of local volunteers following the capture of Gudauta.

Due to the unstable situation and pockets of Bolshevik guerrilla resistance, Mazniashvili declared martial law in Abkhazia, causing friction with the Abkhaz People's Council. Nevertheless, the two sides remained in agreement on the need to advance into the Black Sea region to consolidate their victory over the Bolsheviks. In response to a request from the Sochi administration on 24 June for assistance in expelling the Bolsheviks and temporarily incorporating the area into Georgia, the Abkhaz People's Council adopted a resolution calling on Georgian-Abkhaz forces to advance toward Sochi and Tuapse. The decision was also motivated by the prospect of restoring what was regarded as the historical borders of Abkhazia and Georgia, as the territory had formed part of the medieval Kingdom of Abkhazia and Kingdom of Georgia, as well as the ancient proto-Georgian states of Colchis and Lazica, although it had been lost by the end of the 15th century. The operation also aimed to secure access to grain and petroleum supplies from the Kuban, which were considered essential to Georgia.

On 27 June 1918, a small Ottoman expeditionary force under Colonel Jemal-Bey Marshan landed at the mouth of the Kodor River near the village of Tskurgil, consisting of approximately 1,000 Ottoman infantrymen and carrying a significant quantity of arms and ammunition. The operation was ordered by Ottoman General Wehib Pasha and sanctioned by the Ottoman government following requests from several pro-Ottoman members of the Abkhaz People's Council, including Aleksandr Shervashidze, Tatash Marshania, Mejit Baghapsh, Omar Emoukhvari, and other major landowners. The landing force attempted to capture Sokhumi but was repulsed by the Georgian garrison. While most of the Ottoman troops were driven back to sea, some scattered into the Kodor sector, and Marshan made several further landing attempts in July. The force included Ottoman soldiers of Abkhaz origin, including Marshan himself, although all participants were serving in the Ottoman army. The Ottoman government denied its involvement, attempting to portray the operation as a "private enterprise" undertaken by "Abkhazians" or "Mountaineers" associated with the Mountainous Republic of the Northern Caucasus. In reality, the landing had been ordered by Esat Pasha, reflecting the Ottoman leadership's continued ambitions for territorial expansion in the Caucasus despite the Treaty of Batum. The Mountain Republic itself lacked the means to organize such an operation, as its effective authority did not extend westward beyond Chechnya. The Ottoman government had also frequently portrayed its military operations as being carried out by "local Muslims." The landing failed to trigger an uprising among the local population, which was predominantly Christian and did not regard the Ottoman troops as liberators. In July and August 1918, the remnants of the landing force were gradually eliminated by small Cossack units that had taken refuge in Georgia and were subsequently enlisted to assist the Georgian army. The final clashes took place near Mokvi Monastery, after which Colonel Marshan retreated to Bedia with approximately 150 troops and surrendered to Valiko Jugheli on 15 September.

The end of summer was marked by the near-universal defeat of the Soviet forces in the Caucasus. Mazniashvili subsequently turned his attention to Samurzakano, which remained under the control of local Bolsheviks, and defeated the rebels in September 1918. However, the Whites soon emerged as a new challenge for Georgia, as relations between the two sides rapidly deteriorated despite the initial cooperation.

Aleksandr Shervashidze, Tatash Marshan, and several other members of the APC were charged with orchestrating the Ottoman invasion and subsequently excluded from the council. Meanwhile, the Abkhaz People's Council was reorganized, as its original composition consisted largely of representatives of the ethnic Abkhaz population and the feudal elite of the former Abkhazian Principality, while other ethnic communities in multiethnic Abkhazia were not represented. Its composition was therefore expanded to include additional representatives, among them the chairmen of the Georgian, Armenian, Greek, and Estonian councils that had existed in the Sukhumi Okrug alongside the APC, as well as several elected representatives of other ethnic communities. In early August 1918, a committee was established within the Abkhaz People's Council to prepare elections for an Abkhaz Constituent Assembly, intended to legitimize Abkhazia's political status. In Turkey, Shervashidze accused the Georgian authorities of the "violent dissolution of the Abkhaz People's Council." He later repeated these accusations in the Kuban, where he established contacts with the Volunteer Army and shifted his political orientation from pro-Turkish to pro-Russian. From August to October 1918, German garrisons were stationed in Sukhumi, Ochamchira, and Adler, deterring the White Army from advancing into the region.

In October 1918, an abortive coup took place in Abkhazia with the support of the Volunteer Army. The conspirators included Colonel Prince Robert Chkhotua, the Georgia's minister for Abkhazian affairs, and several members of the APC, most of whom were major landowners who had recently supported the Ottoman intervention. As Ottoman influence in the region waned, they established contacts with the Volunteer Army command and advocated association with Russian State, representing the interests of the local landowning elite. On 9 October, militias loyal to the conspirators attempted to seize the APC headquarters. However, APC chairman Varlam Shervashidze contacted the command of the Georgian garrison in Sukhumi, and the coup attempt was suppressed. Chkhotua and six APC members were arrested. Subsequently, at the initiative of Varlam Shervashidze and several other APC members, the APC was dissolved. Benjamin Chkhikvishvili, the former mayor of Sokhumi, was appointed temporary commissioner of Abkhazia, while the Georgian government issued a decree providing for democratic elections to a new council intended to represent the entire population of Abkhazia.

== See also ==
- Sochi conflict
- German involvement in the Abkhazia conflict
- 1919 Abkhazian People's Council election
- Abkhazian Autonomy
- Politics of Abkhazia
- Politics of Georgia
- List of wars involving Georgia (country)

== Cited works ==
- Andersen, Andrew (2014). Abkhazia and Sochi – The roots of the conflict 1918-1921. Asteroid Publishing, Incorporated. ISBN 9781495381454.
