= Abkhazia operation =

- Part of Abkhazia conflict (1918)
Date	11 May - 11 June, 1918
Location	Abkhazia, Georgia
Result	Georgian victory
Territorial changes	Abkhazia transferred under the jurisdiction of the Georgian Democratic Republic

Belligerents
(Georgia (country)) Georgia; Abkhaz People's Council	Abkhaz Bolsheviks Supported by: Russian Soviet Republic

Commanders and leaders
Valiko Jugheli; Aleksandre Koniashvili; Aleksandre Dgebuadze	Efrem Eshba; Nestor Lakoba

Strength
1,000 men	2,000 men

Casualties and losses
light	heavy

The Abkhazia operation was a successful military operation by the Democratic Republic of Georgia. Its aim was to regain the control over Abkhazia from Abkhazian Bolsheviks.

== Background ==
In March 1918, in Batumi, it was planned to organize an armed uprising on the territory of Abkhazia. Using the Black Sea Fleet, 2,000 rifles were illegally brought from Batumi to Gudauta. The uprising was led by the Abkhazia District Revolutionary committee (Soviet), whose leaders were Efrem Eshba, Nestor Lakoba and Georg Atharbegov. They used the land reform as an excuse to revolt. Armed protests began on April 8 in the districts of Gumista River, Kodori Valley, Samurzakano and Gagra.

On April 11, a 1,500-strong detachment of rebels moved from Gudauta to Sukhumi. The head of the city Chikishvili had 70-80 people at his disposal, which is why he could not protect Sukhumi. Revkom occupied the territory of Abkhazia up to Kodori district, dissolved the local government bodies and established the Bolshevik revolutionary government. The Revcom asked Lenin, the Sochi Revcom, the Kuban-Black Sea Defense Council for military assistance. By the latter's decision, the Belorechensky regiment was sent to help the Sukhumi Revkom. Military forces were mobilized to attack Kodori and Samurzakhano districts. On May 8, the Council of Workers' and Peasants' Deputies of Sukhumi adopted a resolution on joining Soviet Russia.

== Preparation ==
In such conditions, the Seima of Transcaucasia, at the request of the Abkhazian People's Council, made a decision to restore order in Abkhazia. The chief of staff of the People's Guard, Valiko Jugheli, was appointed as the head of the operation, and General Giorgi Mazniashvili, who at that time was fighting against the Ottoman Empire on the Choloki-Nataneb front, was assigned to separate a detachment to fight against the Bolsheviks in Abkhazia. Colonel Alexander Koniashvili and Alexander Dgebuadze went to Abkhazia together with Valiko Jugheli. Abkhaz princes offered help to the People's Guard, according to one version, it was Tatash Marshania and his squad with 300 horsemen.

== Operation ==
On May 11, the People's Guard reached the Kodori River and was stationed in the village of Adzubzha. The Bolshevik force consisted of 10 cannons, many machine guns and 2,000 men. Valiko Jugeli and Alexander Koniashvili gave an ultimatum to the Bolsheviks to lay down their arms within 24 hours. The Bolsheviks did not accept the ultimatum and opened artillery fire. After a week of positional battles, Valiko Sharashidze neutralized six enemy cannons, four near Drandi Monastery and two near Kodori Bridge. On May 12 and 15, Efrem Eshba contacted Moscow by telegram and phone and asked for help. On May 16, Georgian boats opened fire on the sea coast from the mouth of the Kodori River to Sukhumi, causing confusion in the ranks of the enemy and revealing weak links in their positions. On May 17, at 4 o'clock in the morning, the People's Guard went on the offensive. Vanguard was led by Giorgi Lomtatidze and Poruchik Lev Novikov. The Guardsmen, after a fierce battle, occupied the Kodori bridge and took Sukhumi at 3 o'clock in the afternoon, their loss being only 7 wounded, and seized 18 cannons, 30 machine-guns, and many prisoners.

The Bolsheviks fortified themselves in Gagra and prepared for a new attack. Siova Kukhaleishvili remained the military commander. Efrem Eshba went to Sochi and tried to form new squads there. Thanks to the rapidly developing attack, the Guard liberated Gagra, Gudauta and New Athos, captured one ship, 21 machine guns, 11 cannons, including two siege guns, and a large amount of ammunition.

On June 11, 1918, an agreement was signed between the government of the Democratic Republic of Georgia and the People's Council of Abkhazia, which confirmed the existence of Abkhazia as part of Georgia with the right of wide autonomy.
