= Battle of Gagra (1919) =

Battle between Georgia and White Russian forces in 1919

- Part of Sochi conflict
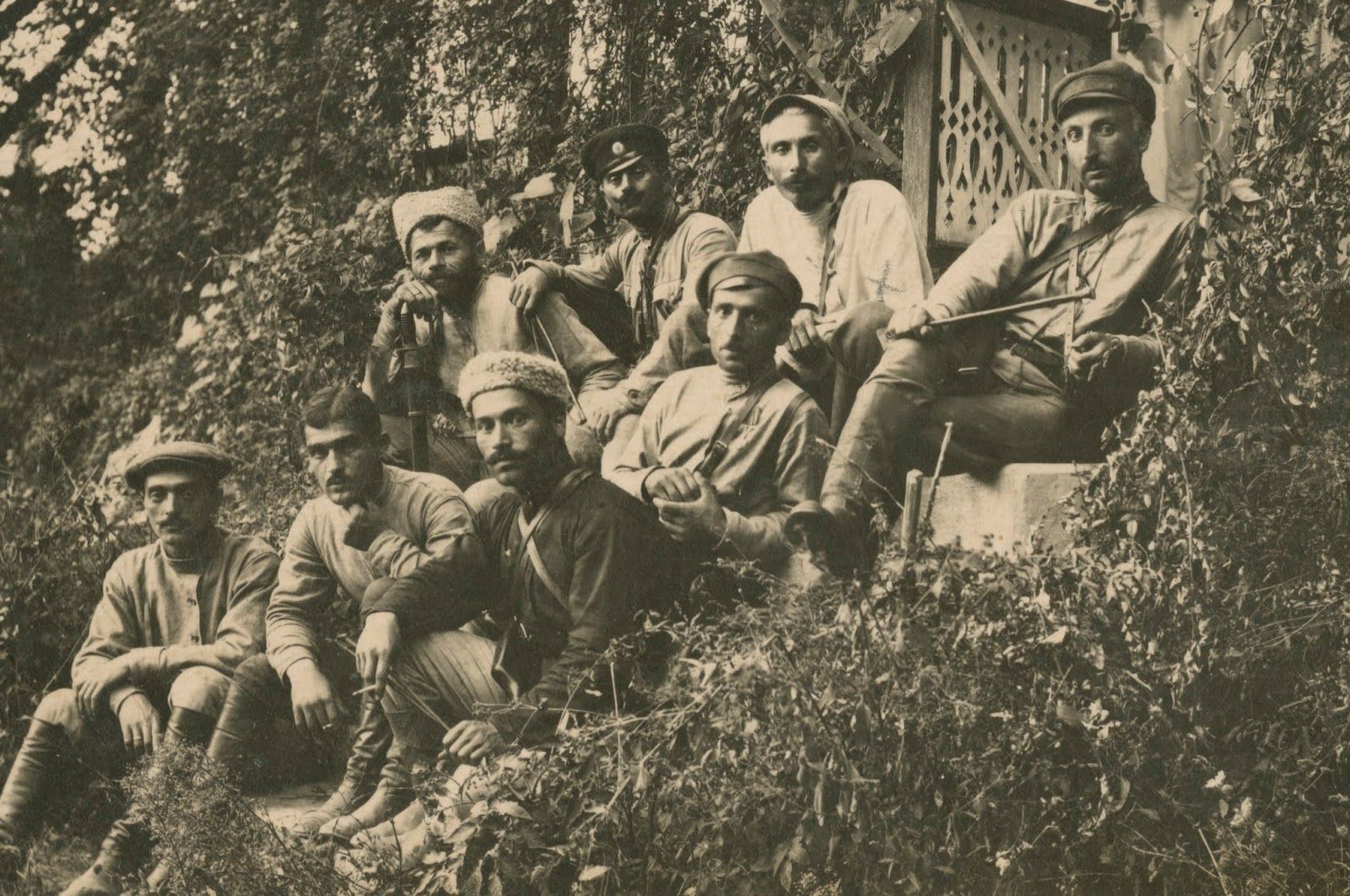
- Georgian People's Guard and its commander Valiko Jugheli (far right) in Gagra
| Date | April 16–19, 1919 |
| Location | Gagra district |
| Status | Georgian victory |

Belligerents
| (Georgia (country)) Democratic Republic of Georgia | South Russia |

Commanders and leaders
| (Georgia (country)) Valiko Jugheli (Georgia (country)) Giorgi Gedevanashvili | (Russia) Anton Denikin |

Units involved
| (Georgia (country)) Regular Army; People's Guard | Armed Forces of South Russia |

Casualties and losses
| Minor casualties | 87–500 dead |

The Battle of Gagra was fought on April 16–19, 1919, between the Democratic Republic of Georgia and the White Army. The battle resulted in a Georgian victory.

== Background ==
Relations between the Georgian Democratic Republic and the White movement were complicated. The White forces were hostile toward Georgia's Menshevik government because of its separation from the Russian Empire, socialist orientation, and pro-German policy prior to Germany's defeat in the First World War. The Georgian government, for its part, did not share the objectives of the White movement. Although cooperation against the Bolsheviks appeared possible in the summer of 1918, negotiations between the two sides in Ekaterinodar in September ended in disagreement and further strained relations. A major point of contention was the question of which side should control the Sochi district. Gagra, a town on the Black Sea coast, was transferred to the Sochi district by the Russian imperial authorities in 1904.

After the Allied victory in the First World War, the Caucasus came under British influence, based on the British-French agreement of December 1917. Both the Whites and the Georgians welcomed the arrival of British forces in the region. Anton Denikin, a supporter of the Allies and commander of the White Army, hoped that Britain would support the principle of a "united and indivisible Russia." Georgia, however, sought British support on the basis of Woodrow Wilson's principle of self-determination.

Britain's primary aim was to preserve the status quo in the region until Russia's future could be determined at the Paris Peace Conference. At this stage, Britain's main priority was to unite the anti-Bolshevik forces against Bolshevism. Britain provided material and diplomatic support to the Volunteer Army and sent a representative to its headquarters in Ekaterinodar. At the same time, it also supported the newly established Caucasian states. British representatives accredited to the respective governments often came to identify with the interests of their host governments, causing British policy to appear contradictory to Denikin. Britain's policy was inconsistent, largely due to a lack of centralized direction and poor communications. Moreover, British representatives to the White movement and Georgia increasingly became aligned with the positions of their respective host governments. The British representatives in Ekaterinodar, Generals Poole and Briggs, supported the claims of the White movement, while British representatives in Tiflis supported Georgian claims. This inconsistency ultimately alienated both sides.

In December 1918, Denikin took advantage of the Armeno-Georgian War to seize, without resistance, part of the disputed territory in the Sochi district previously occupied by Georgia. Britain, however, continued to support the status quo and instructed Denikin not to advance further into Georgian-controlled territory to the south. Denikin resented what he regarded as Britain's unauthorized "disposal of Russian territory" and accused the British of turning a blind eye to Georgia's recent alliance with Germany. He consequently disregarded British demands and crossed the Loo River on February 6, 1919. Within four days, Denikin's forces captured the entire Sochi district, forcing Georgian forces back to the Bzyb River. Gagra was also captured by White forces.

Denikin believed that Britain had sided with Georgia and never forgave the British for what he regarded as a betrayal. Georgia, meanwhile, blamed Britain for allowing the White forces to attack. As a result, British authority was undermined on both sides of the conflict. Although both parties understood that Britain sought to preserve the status quo, it became clear that Britain was unwilling to use force to restore it. The White Army and the People's Guard of Georgia confronted each other along the Bzyb River, while Britain stationed a garrison along the riverbank to separate the opposing forces.

On April 9, 1919, General George Milne, commander of the British Expeditionary Force, informed Denikin that Britain had requested Georgia to withdraw its troops to the Bzyb River line. However, by this time, British inaction had significantly weakened its authority, and Milne's request carried little weight.

Georgian Foreign Minister Evgeni Gegechkori sought to secure British support for a Georgian offensive to retake the Sochi district. According to the minutes of a meeting of the Main Staff of the People's Guard of Georgia, Gegechkori, who attended the meeting, reported that the British had asked Denikin to withdraw his forces, but that the request had been ignored. He also stated that Britain's attitude toward Denikin had deteriorated and that it had reduced its supplies to the White forces. The Field Staff of the People's Guard nevertheless called for an offensive, while the Georgian government opposed the operation, arguing that it was unlikely to improve the situation and that even a successful offensive would yield only limited gains. On April 11, the Main Staff of the People's Guard voted against launching the offensive.

After capturing the Sochi district, the White Guards immediately sought to restore the "pre-revolutionary order." Their measures included returning land to its former owners, carrying out several mobilizations, requisitioning goods, fodder, and transport, and conducting punitive operations as part of the White Terror. In response, a partisan movement emerged as local peasants in the Sochi district organized Green armies. On April 12, 1919, a force of approximately 1,500 White Army soldiers carried out punitive operations against the local populations of Sochi and Adler. This, coupled with Britain's inaction, served as the immediate trigger for the Georgian offensive. Georgia responded by concentrating its forces along the Bzyb River, bringing eight battalions of the regular army and People's Guard, Colonel Gogi Khimshiashvili's People's Guard Cavalry Divizion, and Colonel Kargareteli's four artillery batteries of the People's Guard to readiness for the offensive. Meanwhile, the Main Staff of the Georgian People's Guard issued a call in support of the "comrades from Sochi."

Georgian forces decided to launch an offensive toward the Mekhadir River in the Gagra region. Georgian Foreign Minister Evgeni Gegechkori informed General William Thomson, the newly appointed representative of the British Expeditionary Force, of the planned operation. At Thomson's suggestion, Gegechkori also sent letters to General Milne. Thomson replied that the British command had ordered Georgian forces not to advance without British approval and warned of "grave consequences." He added that Denikin had been given 48 hours to withdraw and that, if he refused, the Georgians would be given freedom of action. As Denikin had failed to withdraw, Gegechkori sent a telegram to General Milne, stating: "You know that the Sochi front has a three-month history. During this time, we expected that the issue would be resolved through diplomacy. We have repeatedly received such a promise from the English government. This long wait had an unbearable psychological effect on the units of our army stationed on the front line. Further inactivity would be equal to disaster. ...The Georgian government expresses its hope that the British High Command will evaluate our move as a forced act of self-defense, which is not against the Georgian government's loyalty to Great Britain." Georgian General Aleksandr Gedevanishvili gave last ultimatum to Denikin. Without waiting for a response from the British authorities, the Georgian government ordered its forces to retake the Gagra region.

== Battle ==
On April 16, 1919, the People's Guard and regular Georgian Army units launched an offensive against the White Army along the Bzyb River, employing infantry, artillery, and cavalry. To facilitate maneuvering, the Georgians had previously constructed a new bridge in the upper reaches of the Bzyb River. On April 17, at approximately 1:00 PM, Giorgi Lomtadze's Third Battalion captured Gagra for the first time, suffering no casualties and taking 500 prisoners. The following day, at approximately 9:00 AM, the People's Guard crossed the Mekhadir River, prompting the White forces to retreat toward the village of Vesyoloye. By April 19, Georgian forces had reached the Mzymta River and advanced toward Adler. At the same time, a peasant uprising by the Green armies broke out in Sochi and Adler behind the White lines. Coordinating with the Georgian forces, the Green Army rebels attacked the White forces from the rear, ultimately forcing them to retreat.

However, British sentiment toward Georgia had soured. Before Georgian forces could launch the second phase of their operation, both General Thomson and General Milne protested against the advance. Thomson characterized the Georgian operation as a "hostile move" toward Britain. Relations were further strained by the robbery and murder of a British captain and doctor in Tiflis. In Akhalkalaki, a Georgian soldier also fired at the car of British Lieutenant Colonel Alan MacDougall Ritchie, although Ritchie was unharmed. General Thomson strongly condemned the incident in an official note. To avoid further deterioration of relations with Britain, the Georgian forces halted their advance toward Sochi and Adler and withdrew to the Psou River. Meanwhile, Denikin prepared his forces for an offensive aimed at recapturing the entire Sochi district and advancing into the Sukhumi district. However, General Charles Briggs, the British representative to Denikin, persuaded him that negotiations might lead Georgia to agree to further territorial withdrawals. According to other accounts, Denikin may have also abandoned the planned offensive because he was unable to mobilize sufficient forces, as most of his troops were engaged on the main front against the Bolshevik Red Army.

Negotiations between the governments of Georgia and South Russia began in Tiflis on May 21, 1919. General Briggs and General William Beach, another British military representative to Denikin, participated in the negotiations on behalf of Denikin's government. Briggs advised the Georgian side that British forces would soon withdraw from the South Caucasus and therefore urged Georgia to improve its relations with Denikin's government. Nevertheless, the negotiations ended inconclusively on May 23, 1919.

On May 24, a second meeting was held between representatives of the Georgian and Denikin governments. General Beach warned the Georgian side that Denikin would launch an attack unless Georgian forces withdrew, but Noe Zhordania responded that, should Denikin attack, Georgia would also hold Britain responsible. Ultimately, Georgia refused to surrender Gagra.

== Source ==
- Kenez, Peter (2021). Civil War in South Russia, 1919-1920. University of California Press. ISBN 9780520327795.
- Chachkhiani, Archil (2015). "1919 Gagra Offensive Operation and Tactical Analysis of Battles". Annals (PDF) (in Georgian). Vol. 11. Tbilisi: Universal.
