= 1918–1920 Georgian–Ossetian conflict =

1918-1920 uprisings in South Ossetia

Georgian-Ossetian conflict (1918–1920)
- Part of the Southern Front of the Russian Civil War
Date	1918–1920
Location	Tskhinvali region, northeastern Georgia
Result	Transcaucasian/Georgian victory

Belligerents
Ossetian Union of Revolutionary Peasantry (1918); Ossetian National Council (1918-1919); Ossetian Revkom (1919-1920); Supported by: Russian SFSR	Transcaucasian Federation (1918); Democratic Republic of Georgia (1918-1920)

Commanders and leaders
Ruten Gagloev; Georgy Gagloev; Vladimir Abaev; Nikolai Gadiev	Valiko Jugheli; Kosta Kaziev

Casualties and losses
4,812–5,279 killed (according to South Ossetia); 20,000 displaced	Unknown

The Georgian–Ossetian conflict of 1918–1920 were a series of uprisings, which took place in the Ossetian-inhabited areas of what is now South Ossetia, a breakaway republic in Georgia, against the Transcaucasian Democratic Federative Republic and then the Menshevik-dominated Democratic Republic of Georgia.

During its brief tenure, the Menshevik government of Georgia came across significant problems with ethnic Ossetians who largely sympathized with the Bolsheviks and Soviet Russia. The reasons behind the conflict were complicated. An overdue land reform and agrarian disturbances in the poor Ossetian-populated areas intermingled with ethnic discord and the struggle for power in the Caucasus.

== 1917–1918 ==
During the rule of the Russian Empire in the Tiflis gubernia most Ossetians in what is today South Ossetia worked as peasants on Georgian-owned farms. As such, during the 1917 February Revolution the Bolsheviks found the Ossetians very receptive to the idea of class conflict as it would also be an ethnic conflict against their Georgian landlords. The first revolt was an unorganized attempt towards returning "land to the peasants" and largely performed by returning soldiers seizing the farms they worked on.

In December 1917 the Ossetian National Council was established. Initially supported by the Georgian government and dominated by Ossetian Mensheviks with a limited Bolshevik and Socialist Revolutionary presence, they held five congresses in short succession that pushed for a separate administrative-political unit. However, at the sixth congress a Bolshevik-dominated council was elected which refused to participate in the Georgian elections, and called for an independent South Ossetian okrug.

The Bolsheviks did not initially enjoy the support of the peasantry in 1917. Before the October Revolution the Ossetian Union of Revolutionary Peasantry was founded to fight the local landowning gentry, which included both Georgians and Ossetians. The Transcaucasian authorities were trying to regulate the land reform. The armed bands, many associated with the Revolutionary Union, began to resist the tax collection efforts, attacked and killed the local gentry and seized their property. The Transcaucasian officials dispatched the Georgian People's Guard in February 1918, appointing ethnic Ossetian commissar Kosta Kazishvili (Kaziev) in the region.

In March 1918, during a public meeting, the Transcaucasian officials, including prominent local noble Giorgi Machabeli and Social Democrat Sandro Ketskhoveli agreed to all rebels' demands, except for the eviction of the nobility. However, further negotiations broke down after the rebels killed Kazishvili, Machabeli, and Ketskhoveli, and took the guardsmen hostage, plundering Tskhinvali on 17 March.

The Georgian People's Guard regained the control of Tskhinvali on 22 March. The Ossetian Mensheviks supported putting down the rebellion and lost the trust of the peasantry henceforth. The uprising was finally suppressed and harsh repressive measures established in the region, generating resentment against the Mensheviks, being now equated, in the eyes of the Ossetians, with Georgians. This also opened the way for strong pro-Bolshevik sentiments among the Ossetians.

== 1919 ==
The year 1919 also saw a series of fruitless discussions concerning the status and governance of the region. Ossetians demanded a degree of autonomy comparable with the one granted to the Abkhazians and Muslim Georgians in Adjara. However, no final decision was made, and the Georgian government outlawed the National Council of South Ossetia, a Bolshevik-dominated body, and refused any grant of autonomy. Shortly after Ossetian leaders appealed to the Entente's mission in the Caucasus to separate "Ossetia" from Georgia.

In October 1919, revolts against the Mensheviks broke out again in several areas. On 23 October, rebels in the Roki area proclaimed the establishment of Soviet power and began advancing toward Tskhinvali, but suffered defeat and retreated to the Soviet-controlled Terek district.

== 1920 ==
In 1920, a much larger Ossetian uprising took place, which was supported by the South Ossetian District Committee Revkom of the Bolshevik Russian Communist Party, which had gathered a military force in Vladikavkaz, the capital of modern-day North Ossetia-Alania, Russia. Despite assurance of respecting Georgia's territorial integrity in the Treaty of Moscow of 7 May 1920, Soviet Russia demanded Georgia recall its troops from "Ossetia". On May 8, the Ossetians declared a Soviet republic in the Roki area on the Russian-Georgian border A Bolshevik force from Vladikavkaz crossed into Georgia and helped the local rebels to attack a Georgian force in the Java district. By June 7 the Revkom was in control of Tskhinvali and on June 8 declared Soviet authority throughout South Ossetia.

The rebellious areas were effectively incorporated into Soviet Russia. However, Vladimir Lenin's desire to keep peace with Georgia at that time and eventual military failures of the rebels forced the Bolsheviks to distance themselves from the Ossetian struggle. The Georgian People's Guard under Valiko Jugheli launched a large counter-offensive with great violence, defeating the insurgents in a series of hard-fought battles. Tskhinvali would be recaptured on June 12. In the spring and summer of 1920, Georgia crushed the revolt. After June 1920 the Revkom continued to operate in exile in North Ossetia, with an underground presence in South Ossetia.

Many villages were burned down large areas were depopulated, around 5,000 people perished and 20,000 Ossetians were forced to seek refuge in Soviet Russia. Ossetian sources give the following breakdown of casualties: 387 men, 172 women, and 110 children were killed in action or massacred; 1,206 men, 1,203 women, and 1,732 children died during flight. The total fatalities amounted to 4,812–5,279 according to another Ossetian source, i.e., 6–8 percent of the region's total Ossetian population.

== Aftermath ==
In February 1921 the advancing Red Army brought Georgia's independence to an end. During the Red Army's advance, the South Ossetian Revkom again set up a base of operations in Tskhinvali. However, almost immediately, there was again disagreements to the extent of South Ossetia's autonomy with the new Georgian Revkom. Many Georgians blamed Ossetians for supporting the Soviet forces and as such the idea of autonomy was unpopular amongst the Georgian population. In April 1922, the newly established Soviet Georgian government established the South Ossetian Autonomous Oblast within the Georgian SSR, much to the dismay of the Ossetians who wanted to be attached to Russia alongside North Ossetia. According to Anastas Mikoyan, Joseph Stalin had initially approved transferring North Ossetia to the Georgian SSR in July 1925 to alleviate this split, but later decided against it, fearing it would lead to other ethnic groups in Russia demanding to leave the RSFSR.

== Assessment ==
On 20 September 1990 the government of South Ossetia declared that there was a "genocide" accusing the 1919 Georgian government of "nazi reprisals over the peaceful peasantry of South Ossetia" alleging the Mensheviks wanted to erase the Ossetian people, and that over 75% of the Ossetian population had been killed or forced to flee. On 2 November 2006, the People's Assembly of Abkhazia unanimously passed a resolution recognizing the Georgian actions of 1918–1920 and 1989–1992 as a genocide under the 1948 convention.

Georgia considers the figures exaggerated. According to Georgian historian Bondo Kupatadze, the Georgian actions were response to the uprising launched by the Bolsheviks and it was "an entirely anti-Bolshevik operation" rather than an ethnic conflict. While the campaign was brutal, there was no way for the counter-insurgency operation to avoid civilian casualties. Georgians view the conflict as the first attempt by Russia to destabilise Georgia by encouraging Ossetian separatism and explain the severity of Georgian reaction by the Ossetian pillage of Tskhinvali and the Bolsheviks' role in the events.

The EU report came to the conclusion that the allegations of "genocide" were unfounded and exaggerated, as the events don't meet the common criteria which define genocide. Neither the United Nations, nor any international human rights organization or UN member state uses the term "genocide" to describe these events. Despite this, the narrative of alleged "three genocides" is constantly used by the South Ossetian political elite to undermine the willingness of the South Ossetian population to rejoin Georgia.

== Bibliography ==
- Cornell, Svante E. (2002). Autonomy and Conflict: Ethnoterritoriality and Separatism in the South Caucasus: Cases in Georgia (PDF). Uppsala: Uppsala University. ISBN 91-506-1600-5. OCLC 50053064. Archived from the original (PDF) on 30 June 2007.
- de Waal, Thomas (2010). The Caucasus: An Introduction. Oxford: Oxford University Press. ISBN 978-0-19-975043-6. OCLC 667234711.
- Lang, David M. (1962). A Modern History of Georgia. Curzon. ISBN 9780700715626.
- Saparov, Arsène (2014). From conflict to autonomy in the Caucasus: the Soviet Union and the making of Abkhazia, South Ossetia and Nagorno Karabakh. ISBN 978-1-317-63783-7. OCLC 1124532887.
- Tsutsiev, Arthur (2014). Atlas of the Ethno-Political History of the Caucasus. Translated by Nora Seligman Favorov. New Haven: Yale University Press. ISBN 9780300153088. OCLC 884858065.
- Martin, Terry (2001), The Affirmative Action Empire: Nations and Nationalism in the Soviet Union, 1923–1939, Ithaca, New York: Cornell University Press, ISBN 978-0-80-143813-4
