= Abkhazian cheese =

Abkhazia cheese

- Abkhazian fried cheese
- Type: Cheese
- Place of origin: Abkhazia
- Associated cuisine: Georgian cuisine
- Main ingredients: Cow's milk, Goat's milk, or Buffalo's milk

Abkhazian cheese (Georgian: აფხაზური ყველი, romanized: apkhazuri q'veli; Turkish: Abhaz peyniri) is a cheese found across the Abkhazia and other areas with an Abkhazian diaspora in Turkey. Abkhazian cheese belongs to Pasta filata family of cheeses. Generally, sheep's and cow's milk or cow's and buffalo's milk are used.

== Sakarya Abkhazian cheese ==
Abkhazian cheese was first made by Abkhazians who settled in Sakarya province 700 years ago. After the Russian conquest of the region in 1864, large numbers of Abkhaz families were forced to leave their homeland and resettle in the Ottoman Empire. From there, their descendants became part of the population of today’s Turkey. Cheese-making techniques were carried into exile as part of household knowledge passed down mainly through women.

It is a cheese that has similar properties to Kasseri and dil peyniri. Sakarya Abkhazian cheese was registered by the Turkish Patent and Trademark Office on 03.05.2021 and received geographical indication.
