= Regular Army of the Georgian Democratic Republic =

Military of the Democratic Republic of Georgia (1918–1921)

Regular Army of the Democratic Republic of Georgia
- საქართველოს დემოკრატიული რესპუბლიკის რეგულარული არმია
- Founded: June 1918; 108 years ago
- Disbanded: 1921
- Country: Democratic Republic of Georgia
- Type: Army
- Size: 20,000–30,000 war time strength
- Garrison/HQ: Tbilisi, Democratic Republic of Georgia
- Engagements: Caucasus campaign (Note: As the Georgian Army Corps.); Abkhazia conflict Sochi conflict Armeno-Georgian War; Red Army invasion of Georgia

Commanders
- Commander-in-Chief: Giorgi Kvinitadze; Ilia Odishelidze
- Notable commanders: Giorgi Kvinitadze; Giorgi Mazniashvili; Kote Abkhazi; Ilia Odishelidze; Aleksandre Andronikashvili; Aleksandre Gedevanishvili; Zakaria Mdivani; Valerian Tevzadze; Aleksandre Zakariadze; Shalva Maglakelidze; Taras Vashakidze; Kirile Kutateladze (Note: General of the Artillery); Abel Makashvili; Davit Artmeladze; Ioseb Gedevanishvili; Giorgi Tsulukidze

The Regular Army of the Democratic Republic of Georgia (Georgian: საქართველოს დემოკრატიული რესპუბლიკის რეგულარული არმია, romanized: sakartvelos demok'rat'iuli resp'ublik'is regularuli armia) was the military of the Democratic Republic of Georgia. It existed in parallel to the People's Guard of Georgia.

== History ==
=== Background (1917–1918) ===
In response to the October Revolution of 1917 and the collapse of the Russian Provisional Government, the major Transcaucasian political organisations refused to recognise the new Bolshevik government. They established the Transcaucasian Commissariat, a coalition government composed of Azerbaijani Musavats, Armenian Dashnaks, and Georgian Social-Democrats. Initially conceived as a temporary administration pending the restoration of a legitimate Russian government, the Commissariat continued to regard Transcaucasia as part of Russia. However, amid the Russian Civil War and the Brest-Litovsk negotiations, it eventually moved toward independence, and the sovereign Transcaucasian Democratic Federative Republic was proclaimed in April 1918.

The Transcaucasian Commissariat inherited responsibility for the Caucasian Front of the First World War. The Russian Caucasian Army was exhausted and increasingly disorganised, with many soldiers sympathetic to the Bolsheviks and the army undergoing spontaneous demobilisation.

As the threat of an Ottoman invasion grew, the Transcaucasian government authorised the formation of national armed forces from the remnants of the Russian army to occupy abandoned positions along the front. The respective national councils and military commissariats of the Transcaucasian peoples were tasked with organising these forces. However, shortages of weapons and ammunition, political patronage at the expense of military professionalism, widespread Bolshevik sympathies among the soldiers, and low morale and discipline hampered the process.

The Georgian Army Corps was formed from Georgian personnel serving in the Russian army on the Caucasus Front on 5 November 1917. The Transcaucasian Commissariat and the army command believed that national formations would be more effective in defending the region against the Ottomans than the other units on the front, which were increasingly influenced by revolutionary ideas and unwilling to continue fighting, leading to mass desertions. However, the national formations, including the Georgian Corps, also suffered from declining morale and discipline and proved largely incapable of sustained combat operations. The Georgian Corps comprised only about 10,300 men, making it smaller than a full division. In February 1918, Georgian regiments mutinied in Gori, Telavi, and Kutaisi, but the Red Guard suppressed the uprisings.

The Red Guard was a paramilitary organisation of the Social Democratic Party of Georgia established in 1917 as the major political parties began forming their own armed forces amid the revolutionary upheavals. Initially known as the Workers' Red Guard, it carried out its first major operation on 12 December 1917, when it seized a district arms depot in Tiflis from pro-Bolshevik guards, thereby preventing a Bolshevik coup in Georgia. The Red Guard was subordinated to the Tiflis Council of Workers' and Soldiers' Deputies, a body dominated by Georgian Social Democrats. It consisted primarily of volunteers and had no formal officer corps.

=== Establishment (1918) ===
After the declaration of Georgian independence, debate over organising the Georgian armed forces around the Georgian Army Corps intensified. The ruling Social Democratic Party of Georgia, reflecting its Marxist outlook, favoured a Swiss-style militia system and regarded the Red Guard as a prototype for such a force. Nevertheless, given the region's complex political and military situation, the Social Democrats also recognised the need for a strong regular army. They envisioned ultimately integrating the Red Guard and the regular army into a unified militia system. The military leadership, by contrast, advocated establishing a strong regular army and was willing to accept the continued existence of a separate Red Guard only if it operated in close coordination with the army. This position was supported by German military officials, (Note: Following the Treaty of Poti between the Georgian Democratic Republic and the German Empire, several units of the Imperial German Army were deployed to Georgia as part of the military cooperation envisaged by the treaty.) a stance that was viewed with disfavour by the Social Democrats. The opposition National Democratic Party, including its prominent leader Davit Vachnadze, likewise advocated a unified army under a single commander that would bring together members of all social classes.

The Social Democrats feared the emergence of Bonapartism within the armed forces and a repetition of the Kornilov affair. They also suspected that the opposition National Democrats might ally with the German Empire to stage a coup against the government. Their distrust of the prospective regular army was further reinforced by Bolshevik sympathisers among Georgian military personnel, who frequently organised mutinies. By contrast, the volunteer-based Red Guard was considered more politically reliable and had played a key role in suppressing Bolshevik uprisings. The Social Democrats therefore justified the Guard's continued existence primarily by emphasizing its role in countering internal threats.

Ultimately, Georgia had both a regular army and the Red Guard. The latter was soon renamed the People's Guard and was primarily responsible for maintaining internal security. In wartime, it was to be dissolved as a separate formation, with its members joining the army through their respective enlistment offices. The People's Guard was formally established as a state institution under a law enacted in July 1918. During peacetime, the Guard remained outside the jurisdiction of the Ministry of Defence, unlike the regular army, and was subordinated to its own General Headquarters. In wartime, both the army and the People's Guard came under the authority of the Commander-in-Chief. Service in the People's Guard did not exempt its members from compulsory military service; consequently, upon mobilisation, guardsmen were to be distributed among regular army units. The Guard was directly subordinate to the chairman of the government and maintained its own district headquarters. These district headquarters were elected by local guardsmen and required confirmation by the General Headquarters.

In June 1918, the government issued its first decree regulating the regular army and establishing its provisional organisational structure. The Ministry of Defence placed the army under its authority, with the deputy minister serving as its commander. The army had a General Staff and a Field Staff; the latter handled training and supply, while the former managed war planning, mobilisation schemes, topography, and legislative matters. The Georgian Army Corps was reorganised as the Georgian Regular Army, and the corps commander was replaced by a Commander-in-Chief. The regular army was to be recruited through compulsory conscription. Conscripts had to serve two years in the army, followed by 18 years in the reserve and a further eight years in the militia. In contrast, the People's Guard remained a volunteer-based force.

Relations between the Regular Army and the People's Guard were marked by persistent antagonism, and parallel military structures hindered effective coordination. Tensions occasionally escalated into armed clashes between guardsmen and regular army personnel. The People's Guard was generally treated as the more privileged of the two forces. Although it was formally required to come under the authority of the Commander-in-Chief during wartime, with guardsmen being incorporated into regular army units, in practice they often continued to operate as separate People's Guard formations and frequently disregarded the orders of the Commander-in-Chief.

The regular army had its own senior military chaplain, a position held by Anton Totibadze.

In August 1918, new legislation established the organisational structure of the regular army. Under the 1918 establishment, the army was to comprise two infantry divisions, a separate artillery brigade, a cavalry brigade, an engineering-technical force, and a coastal (border) force, with a total authorized strength of 41,260 personnel.

The army was to comprise the following formations:

- Infantry division: division headquarters, 3 infantry regiments, an artillery brigade, a separate cavalry squadron, and a sapper company — 11,178 men, 45/54 (Note: 45 in peacetime and 54 in wartime) cannons, and 1,680 horses.
- Artillery brigade: brigade headquarters, a light artillery divizion consisting of 3 four-gun batteries, and 2 field heavy howitzer divizions, each consisting of 3 four-howitzer batteries (with 2 guns per battery in peacetime) — 2,146 men, 30/48 cannons, and 870 horses.
- Cavalry brigade: brigade headquarters; 3 cavalry regiments, each consisting of a regimental headquarters, 3 cavalry squadrons, a cavalry machine-gun squadron, a communications group, a cavalry sapper company, a training group, a repair group, and a bugler group; a reserve squadron; and a cavalry artillery battery — 3,437 men, 4 cannons, and 3,173 horses.
- Engineering-Technical Force: a Sapper Battalion, Technical Battalion, Special Motor Company, Armoured Vehicle Company, and Aviation Squadron — 2,656 men, 6 armoured vehicles, 11 cars, 35 trucks, 6 car-trucks, 3 car workshops, 8 motorcycles, 7 bicycles, and an unspecified number of aircraft.
- Coastal Guard: three detachments and a training detachment — 4,859 men and 1,146 horses.

Under the August 1918 law, the National Council was the supreme authority over the army and exercised its powers through the government and the Ministry of the Military. The Commander-in-Chief was to be appointed by the government during wartime and granted full operational authority. The Ministry of the Military established the General Headquarters of the Regular Army, while a Field Staff was to be formed in wartime.

Although Georgia had a manpower pool of approximately 164,000 men, which was expected to be fully mobilised in wartime, the regular army struggled to recruit sufficient personnel. Equipment shortages, economic difficulties, logistical challenges, inexperienced and insufficiently diligent officers, low troop morale, and other factors limited recruitment to about 9,000–12,000 men in peacetime and 20,000–30,000 through wartime mobilisation. Moreover, the repeated mobilisation and demobilisation necessitated by the country's successive wars disrupted conscription and prevented the proper training of troops. By late September 1918, the regular army consisted of the 1st Division (2,333 men), 2nd Division (3,032 men), Army Artillery Brigade (600 men), Cavalry Brigade (993 men), Coastal Army (1,181 men), and Engineering-Technical Force (769 men). All formations were severely understrength, and the entire army had fewer personnel than a single full-strength division. By October, the army was short of approximately 60% of its authorised personnel and 80% of its horses.

The failure of the 1918 conscription campaign demonstrated that Georgia lacked the resources to maintain a large regular army. Moreover, Georgia relied heavily on the German Empire, which had an interest in maintaining a strong Georgian military presence. However, Germany's defeat in the First World War in November 1918 further complicated Georgia's strategic position and removed an important source of support. These developments prompted the government to reorganise the structure and personnel establishment of the permanent regular army.

=== 1919–1921 ===
In 1919, discussions began on reorganising the armed forces. Aleksandre Gedevanishvili, the Deputy Minister of the Military, advocated using the People's Guard as the basis for the armed forces and merging the headquarters of the two formations into a single Military Collegium to improve coordination, while leaving the transition to a militia system for a later stage. He did not, however, oppose retaining the Regular Army and the People's Guard as separate formations. Voronovich, head of the People's Guard's Formation Department, proposed abolishing the regular army altogether and introducing compulsory military service in the People's Guard. General Kvinitadze also asked to submit a proposal, took the opposite position, advocating abolishing the People's Guard in favour of a strong regular army, appointing a military officer as Minister of the Military, and implementing territorial-based mobilisation. Ultimately, both formations were retained, and a commission comprising representatives of both the Regular Army and the People's Guard was established to consider their organisation.

In July 1919, the army was reorganised and reduced to a peacetime strength of 16,950 personnel. It adopted a cadre system, under which the peacetime army consisted of 3 infantry brigades, an army artillery divizion, a cavalry regiment, a coastal (border) detachment, engineering-technical forces, and a military school. In wartime, the 3 infantry brigades were to be expanded into 3 divisions. The planned wartime strength of the army was 45,820 men, although this figure was classified. The peacetime structure of the army was as follows:

- Infantry brigade: brigade headquarters, 4 infantry battalions, and an artillery divizion consisting of 3 batteries — 3,330 men and 12 cannons.
- Army Artillery Divizion: divizion headquarters, a mountain battery, a light howitzer battery, and a heavy field artillery battery — 565 men and 12 cannons.
- Cavalry regiment: regimental headquarters, 3 squadrons, a cavalry machine-gun squadron, a communications company, a cavalry sapper squadron, a training company, and a non-commissioned company — 633 men.
- Coastal Guard: Coastal Guard Squad; detachments in Poti, Akhaltsikhe, Sokhumi, Dariali, Sighnaghi, and Borchalo; the Tbilisi Guards Battalion; and a flotilla — 3,116 men.
- Engineering-Technical Forces: Engineering-Technical Forces Headquarters, a Battalion of Demolition Workers, a separate motor team, an aviation team, an aviation school, and a radio-telegraph team — 1,240 personnel. The force had 69 vehicles, 4 of them armoured, and 16 motorcycles; the number of aircraft was unspecified.

The 1919 project was drafted by Colonel Aleksandre Zakariadze.

In 1919, the Georgian army continued to build up with the involvement of Georgian generals and officers who had served in the Imperial Russian Army. Colonel Valerian Tevzadze translated Russian military regulations into Georgian, and the resulting texts were distributed among the troops.

On 30 May 1919, Georgia established a Military Council to inspect the armed forces and oversee their supply. It was intended to resolve disputes between the People's Guard and the regular army over these matters.

Among other reforms, the new laws established a military school to train officers and lieutenants of all ranks. Muslims and Doukhobors were exempted from military conscription. In November 1919, Abkhazians were likewise exempted from conscription.

In April 1920, amid the Red Army invasion of Azerbaijan, Georgia established the Defence Council of the Republic to strengthen the armed forces and oversee war planning. The council operated until August, when it was dissolved, and was reconstituted in November, continuing to function until the country lost its independence. It had no authority to interfere with the operational activities of the Commander-in-Chief.

The period of compulsory military service was reduced to one year and four months, followed by one year and eight months in the reserve. Service in the People's Guard was now legally equated with service in the regular army; however, in practice, the People's Guard continued to rely exclusively on volunteers and was never staffed with conscripts. The People's Guard continued to operate de facto independently during wartime, and this arrangement was to some extent formalised by law. In November 1920, the Defence Council issued a decree authorising the Main Headquarters of the People's Guard to establish Field Staffs that would coordinate with front commanders, to whom People's Guard units were to be subordinated. In practice, the People's Guard units followed the directives of these Field Staffs.

On 25 June 1920, the army's authorised strength was slightly increased to 19,360 personnel. The Georgian-Muslim Cavalry Division, Georgian-Muslim Infantry Battalion, Georgian Legion, and Borchalo Azerbaijani Cavalry Company were incorporated into the army. The Georgian-Muslim units had been established by the political leadership to combat separatist rebels between January and April 1919, when Georgia faced revolts in the Akhaltsikhe and Ardahan districts, supported by the South-Western Caucasian Republic. Although designated a cavalry division, the unit was only battalion-sized, comprising cavalry and infantry squadrons and a machine-gun platoon, with 276 personnel.

In 1921, the Minister of the Military estimated the recruitable population at 151,180 men, although the army continued to suffer from a personnel shortage.

== Structure ==
| Name | Location |
|---|---|
| 1st Army Infantry Brigade | Kutaisi |
| 2nd Army Infantry Brigade | Tbilisi |
| 3rd Army Infantry Brigade | Gori |
| Army Artillery Brigade | Tbilisi |
| Army Cavalry Divizion | Tetritskaro |
| Sapper Battalion | Tbilisi |
| Coastal Guard detachments | Poti; Akhaltsikhe; Sokhumi; Darial Gorge; Sighnaghi; Shulaveri |
| Tbilisi Guards Battalion | Tbilisi |

=== Combat composition ===
- 1st Army Infantry Brigade (Headquarters: Kutaisi)
  - 1st Infantry Battalion (Kutaisi)
  - 2nd Infantry Battalion (Sokhumi)
  - 3rd Infantry Battalion (Poti)
  - 4th Infantry Battalion (Ozurgeti)
  - 1st Artillery Divizion (Kutaisi)
- 2nd Army Infantry Brigade (Headquarters: Tbilisi)
  - 5th Infantry Battalion (Tbilisi)
  - 6th Infantry Battalion (Telavi)
  - 7th Infantry Battalion (Tbilisi)
  - 8th Infantry Battalion (Dedoplistskaro)
  - 2nd Artillery Divizion (Mukhrovan-Gombori)
- 3rd Army Infantry Brigade (Headquarters: Gori)
  - 9th Infantry Battalion (Akhaltsikhe)
  - 10th Infantry Battalion (Gori)
  - 11th Infantry Battalion (Akhalkalaki)
  - 12th Infantry Battalion (Manglisi)
  - 3rd Artillery Divizion (Gori)
- Tbilisi Guards Battalion (Tbilisi)
- Army Artillery Brigade (Tbilisi)
- Army Cavalry Divizion (Tetritskaro)
- Sapper Battalion (Tbilisi)

== Equipment ==
The Mosin–Nagant was the Georgian infantry's primary rifle. The army also employed rifles of various origins, calibres, and ranges, including the Lebel, Gras, Berdan, Mannlicher, Arisaka, three-line Winchester, Mauser, and various models and modifications of the Krag–Jørgensen and Martini–Henry rifles. Officers were armed with Nagant M1895 revolvers, as well as Frontier Bulldog revolvers and Luger, M1911, and Mauser C96 pistols. The PM M1910 and Lewis gun were the Georgian army's primary machine guns.

Georgia inherited a limited number of weapons from the Russian Caucasian Army stockpiles. As of July 1918, the Georgian regular army had 4,796 rifles and carbines, 223 machine guns, and more than 24 million cartridges in its arsenal. These included 2,812 Mosin–Nagant rifles (7.62 mm) with 2,037,880 cartridges; 147 Japanese Arisaka rifles (6.5 mm) with 3,686,900 cartridges; 218 Berdan rifles (10.75 mm) with 7,881,819 cartridges; 190 Swiss-Italian Vetterli rifles (10.35 mm) with 857,520 cartridges; 1,322,698 cartridges for French Lebel rifles (8 mm); and 7,464,041 cartridges for French Chauchat machine guns (8 mm). Since Georgia had no Chauchat machine guns, the army could use their cartridges in Lebel rifles, but not in its principal infantry rifle, the Mosin–Nagant. In addition to these rifles and ammunition, the Georgian army had 222 Lewis guns with 203,768 cartridges and one Colt machine gun with 8,000 cartridges. The number of rifles already in use by the Georgian army before independence is unknown. As of July 1918, however, the army is estimated to have had 9,045 Mosin–Nagant rifles in service. Although the number of cartridges already in use by the army at that time is likewise unknown, the available figures suggest that the army faced a serious shortage of ammunition, as well as a shortage of rifles for wartime mobilisation and, to a lesser extent, machine guns.

The Georgian army replenished its stockpiles through various means, including purchasing weapons, disarming the population, and seizing weaponry. After the Imperial German Army withdrew from the Caucasus, Germany transferred heavy machine guns, mortars, and vehicles to Georgia. Germany also sold Georgia 20,000 rifles and four million cartridges captured from the Imperial Russian Army, although by 1919 Georgia was unable to pay for them. The number of Lewis and Maxim guns in the stockpiles increased to 472, while the number of Mosin–Nagant rifles reached 22,812, with 6,037,880 cartridges. Between May 1918 and May 1919, 25,000 of the 30,000 rifles of various types held in Georgian stockpiles were issued to the Georgian army, while the remainder were issued to the Guard. Overall, the Georgian army is estimated to have possessed approximately 40,000 Mosin–Nagant rifles, along with considerably smaller numbers of other rifles and carbines.

After the German handovers, the Georgian army had 472 machine guns in its stockpiles, while the number already in service in 1918 is unknown. In 1919, the Georgian army received 400 machine guns from the stockpiles.

In July 1920, according to Pavel Satin, the Soviet Russian military attaché to Georgia, the Georgian authorities disarmed White Army units that had fled to Georgia from the Red Army. The Georgian army seized all of their artillery pieces, two tanks, 1,600 horses, three armoured and transport vehicles, 200 cartloads, 40 machine guns, two light automobiles, and up to 20,000 rifles. The French military attaché, however, reported different figures, stating that Georgia had seized only 7,000 rifles, 150 machine guns, 10 howitzers, two tanks, 21 trucks, six automobiles, 13 motorcycles, one radiotelegraph, hundreds of cartloads, and up to 3,000 horses.

In contrast to the rifle shortage, Georgia maintained a relatively large stockpile of grenades, estimated at between 57,584 and 200,000. However, troops used only about 3,000 in 1918 because they lacked sufficient knowledge of how to use them.

In terms of artillery, Georgia possessed 3-inch (76.2 mm) field guns of the 1900 and 1902 models, 3-inch (76.2 mm) mountain guns of the 1904 and 1909 models, 48-line (122 mm) howitzers of the 1904, 1905, and 1909 models, and 45-line (114 mm) British howitzers. As of July 1918, the stockpiles contained 156 artillery pieces: 115 3-inch (76.2 mm) 1909-model mountain guns, 12 3-inch field guns, six 48-line (122 mm) howitzers, and two 45-line (114 mm) howitzers. The stockpiles also contained 112,492 shells, but not all could be used because Georgia lacked some corresponding artillery pieces. Of the available ammunition, 42,029 shells were allocated to the 3-inch (76.2 mm) 1909-model mountain guns, equivalent to 365 shells per gun. By 1919, this stockpile had fallen to 33,023 shells, or 287 shells per gun. Each 48-line howitzer had 123 shells allocated. The shortage was less pronounced for the 3-inch field guns, for which 1,389 shells per gun were available in July 1918; this figure had declined to 865 by March 1919. The 45-line howitzers had 4,000 shells per gun in stock.

In addition, the stockpiles contained 99 9 mm grenade launchers with 94,906 shells and eight mortars with 230 shells. In 1920, Georgia also received two 6-line field howitzers and two mountain howitzers, although these were still insufficient to meet the wartime establishment of the army's units.

The Georgian armed forces had seven armoured vehicles: one Garford-Putilov armoured car, four Austin armoured cars, one Pierce-Arrow armoured car, and one locally built armoured Napier car. In addition, the People's Guard seized and operated two obsolete Mark V tanks abandoned by the Russian White Army. In 1918, the Regular Army's Armoured Vehicle Company was authorised six armoured vehicles. In 1919, it was reorganised as a Separate Vehicle Team and authorised four vehicles, with this number rising to six in wartime. The People's Guard likewise maintained its own Armoured Vehicle Team. These establishment figures, however, did not correspond to the actual number of armoured vehicles in service. The Regular Army in fact had only two armoured vehicles. They were named "Homeland" (Austin) and "Georgia" (Napier, captured from the Red Army in 1919), while the People's Guard's vehicles were named "Guardsman", "Proletarian", "International", "Peasant", and "Struggle". The armoured vehicles were supplied to the Georgian armed forces by the German Empire.

The People's Guard operated four armoured trains, among the most powerful weapons in the Georgian armed forces. Each carried three to four mountain guns and 14 to 25 machine guns. The Georgian armoured trains were named "Republican", "Worker", "Victory or Death", and "Freedom Fortress". The trains were inherited from the First Caucasian Separate Railway Brigade of the Russian Railway Troops. Three of the four were lost during the Armeno-Georgian War, after which a new armoured train was commissioned in March 1919. A third armoured train, armed with two mountain guns and 10 machine guns, was constructed in early 1920. Construction of the fourth began in December 1920 under the leadership of Valodia Goguadze, commander of the People's Guard's Armoured Train Squad.

Georgia inherited mostly obsolete and worn-out aircraft from the First World War. In 1920, the White Army handed over four Sopwith Camel F.1 fighters to Georgia as it retreated from the Red Army. That summer, Georgia purchased ten SVA.10s from the Ansaldo plant in the Kingdom of Italy. The Georgian air force suffered from shortages of fuel and oil.

The Georgian navy consisted of only a few small Greenport boats and occasionally requisitioned civilian vessels for military purposes.

== Sources ==
- Silakadze, Dimitri; Chkonia, Marine (2021). Armed Forces of the Democratic Republic of Georgia (1918–1921) (PDF). Tbilisi: National Library of Georgia. ISBN 9789941977718.
- Silakadze, Dimitri (2023). საქართველოს დემოკრატიული რესპუბლიკის რეგულარული ჯარისა და სახალხო გვარდიის ორგანიზაცია და შეიარაღება (PDF). Tbilisi: National Library of Georgia.
- Anchabadze, George (December 2018). "Armed Forces of Georgian Democratic Republic in 1918–1921". School of Arts and Sciences (5). Latvijas Universitātes Žurnāls Vēsture: 100–116. doi:10.22364/lvzv.5.06.
