= Abkhazians in Turkey =

Abkhazians in Turkey Türkiye'deki Abhazlar
Ҭырқәтәыла иҟоу аԥсуаа

Total population
- 30,000–500,000

Regions with significant populations
- Eskişehir, İzmir, Sakarya, Düzce, Sinop, Samsun

Languages
- Abkhaz, Turkish

Religion
- Sunni Islam, Shia Islam

Related ethnic groups
- Circassians in Turkey

The Abkhazians in Turkey refers to citizens of Turkey who are ethnic Abkhazians originating from Abkhazia. There are 39,000 Abkhaz speakers in Turkey according to the 2001 estimates and around 30,000—500,000 people of Abkhaz descent.

== Numbers ==
Abkhaz-speaking population in Turkey
Year	As first language	As second language	Total	Turkey's population	% of total speakers
1935	10,099	2,108	12,207	16,157,450	0.08
1945	8,602	1,265	9,867	18,790,174	0.05
1950	17,200	-	17,200	20,947,188	0.08
1955	13,655	1,489	15,144	24,064,763	0.06
1960	4,689	8,018	12,707	27,754,820	0.05
1965	4,563	7,836	12,399	31,391,421	0.04

== Notable Abkhaz Turks ==
=== Statesmans ===
- Rauf Orbay (Abkhaz surname Ashkharua) - naval officer, statesman and diplomat.

=== Culture ===
- Mihri Müşfik Hanım (abkhaz surname Achba) – one of the first and most renowned Turkish female painters. She was recognized especially for her portraits, including popular figures Mustafa Kemal Atatürk and Pope Benedict XV.
- Leyla Achba - Abkhazian princess. She is known for writing memoirs, which give details of the sultan's court life and was the first Ottoman court lady to write memoirs.
- İbrahim Süreyya Yiğit – thinker, politician and antisemitic writer, who was directly involved in ratifying the Varlık Vergisi law.
- Keriman Halis Ece – beauty pageant titleholder, pianist, and fashion model who won the Miss Turkey 1932 title. She was also crowned Miss Universe 1932 in Spa, Belgium and thus became Turkey's first Miss Universe.

=== Sports people ===
- Adil Atan (abkhaz surname Twanba) – Olympic bronze medalist in Freestyle wrestling in 1952.
- Haydar Zafer – World champion in Freestyle wrestling in 1951.
- Gündüz Kılıç – football player and coach. Champion of Turkey with Galatasaray SK like a football player in 1938–1939, and manager in 1954-1955 and 1955–1956.
- Altay Bayındır (abkhaz surname Agrba) – professional footballer who plays as goalkeeper im Fenerbahçe S.K.
- Tayfur Havutçu (abkhaz surname Marshan) – international football manager and former player who was most recently the manager of Süper Lig club Kasımpaşa.
- Orkan Çınar - footballer who plays as a winger for MKE Ankaragücü.
- Süleyman Seba (abkhaz surname Tsiba) - the longest presiding Chairman of the Istanbul-based multisports club Beşiktaş J.K.

=== Other ===
- Muhammed Tokcan - leader of the terrorist group "Shamil's Grandsons".

== See also ==
- Abkhazia–Turkey relations
- Turks in Abkhazia
- Ossetians in Turkey
