= German involvement in the Abkhazia conflict =

The German involvement in Abkhazia dates back to the 1870s, when Russian Tsar Alexander II decided to settle German villagers in Abkhazia to "civilize" the newly conquered Caucasian peoples. The German Empire was briefly involved in a military intervention in 1918. More recently, Germany has been involved in diplomatic and peacekeeping efforts to resolve the dispute between the unrecognized breakaway Republic of Abkhazia and Georgia, Germany's strategic ally.

== Early Involvement ==
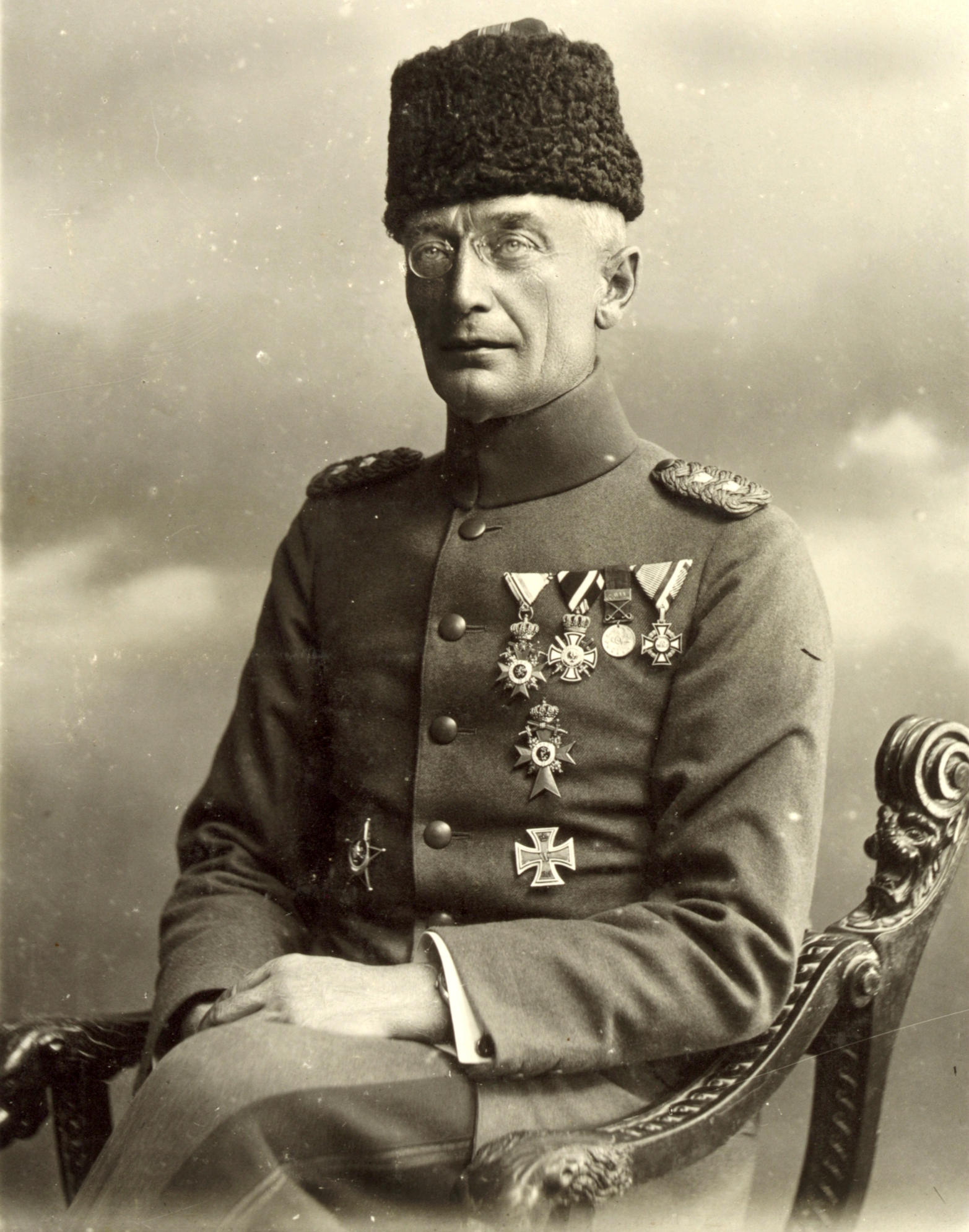
Kress von Kressenstein in 1916

Russian Tsar Alexander II established German villages near Sukhum in Abkhazia in the 1870s, hoping they would help "civilize" the newly incorporated Caucasian tribes.

During World War I, concerned about the security of oil supplies from the Baku region, General Kress von Kressenstein directed the German Caucasus Expedition to give military support to the Democratic Republic of Georgia against the Bolsheviks in Abkhazia in 1918. German troops were tasked with guarding strategic infrastructure, they were never in direct conflict with any foreign troops. German general Erich Ludendorff said that turning Georgia into a German protectorate would ensure Germany access to Caucasus resources independent of Turkey.

In 1942, as the German offensive in southern Russia approached the area, the Soviet government ordered removal of the Abkhaz Germans to Kazakhstan.

== Current German interest ==
Georgia, together with Armenia and Azerbaijan, is located in the South Caucasus, south of Russia. This may give Europe direct access to the energy resources of the Caspian basin via the Nabucco pipeline. Germany has said that it feels a special responsibility to act as broker in the region. Germany is coordinator of the UN secretary-general's Group of Friends of Georgia, and pays special attention to the problems between Georgia and the separatist territories of Abkhazia and South Ossetia. Germany is said to hold the key to Georgia's membership of NATO, and Germany's close relations with Russia make it an essential player in any resolution of the Abkhaz conflict.

== Group of friends ==
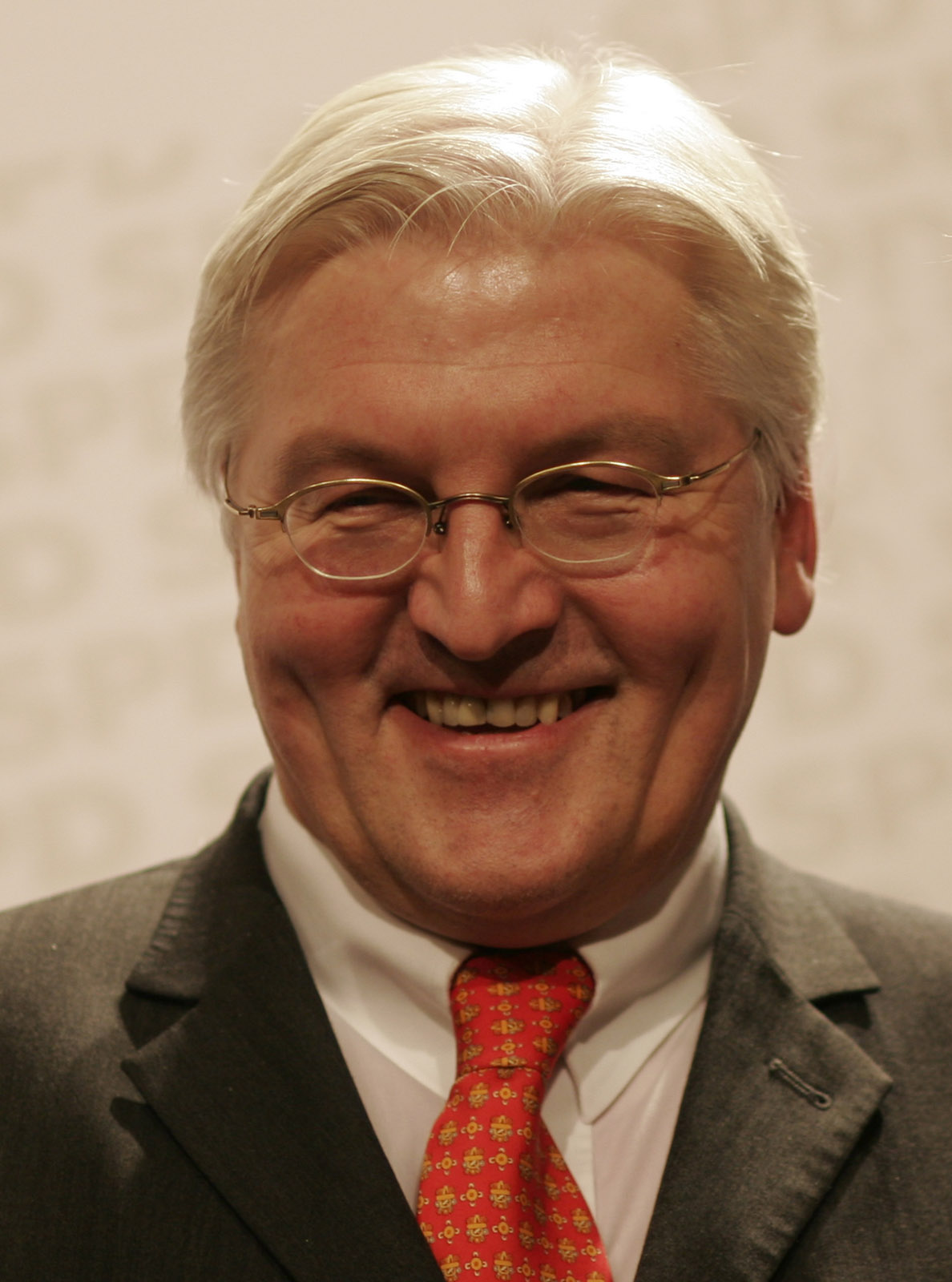
Frank-Walter Steinmeier, Minister of Foreign Affairs of Germany

Following the War in Abkhazia (1992–1993), the Friends of Georgia, with representatives from France, the UK, the US, Germany and Russia was set up to aid the UN Secretary General in the peace process. In May 1996, the ambassadors from the five countries met with the so-called president Vladislav Ardzinba in Sukhumi to discuss options for resolving the conflict. In 1997 they resumed meetings with the Georgian and Abkhaz parties in Geneva under the auspices of the United Nations, with representatives of the Russian Federation and the organization for Security and Cooperation in Europe In late 2000, the group drafted a document entitled "Basic Principles for the Distribution of Competencies between Tbilisi and Sukhumi" that defined Abkhazia as "a sovereign entity" enjoying "special status" within Georgia. In December 2004, representatives of the group met in Geneva to review the state of the Georgian-Abkhaz peace process. They stressed that the United Nations Observer Mission in Georgia (UNOMIG) must continue to be in a position to fulfill its mandate unhindered.

== Peace plan ==
In July 2008, the German foreign minister Frank-Walter Steinmeier distributed a plan titled Georgia/Abkhazia: Elements for a Peaceful Settlement of the Conflict to a United Nations group of experts on Abkhazia. The plan did not mention Georgia's territorial integrity and accepts the continued Russian presence in Abkhazia. Leaders of the opposing sides reacted positively, although the Georgians insisted that Georgia's territorial integrity be guaranteed. The plan asked both sides to agree to avoid violence and to engage in dialog facilitated by the UN Secretary General's Group of Friends (France, Germany, Great Britain, Russia and the U.S.). It also covered return of internally displaced persons, facilitating trade between Abkhazia and Georgia, reconstruction aid and formation of a working group to draft the political status of Abkhazia.

After publishing the peace plan Frank-Walter Steinmeier visited Tbilisi for a diplomatic drive to reduce conflict in the country's separatist conflict zones, meeting with the Georgian president and other leaders in Tbilisi, then traveling to Abkhazia to meet Abkhaz separatist leaders before flying to Moscow. Later that month German Ambassador Patricia Flor accompanied US Deputy Assistant Secretary of State Mathew Bryza in a visit to Sukhumi to discuss the German Peace Plan with de facto Abkhaz leadership. De facto Abkhaz foreign minister Sergey Shamba noted that possible participation in the planned Berlin meeting did not necessarily mean that the Abkhaz side was resuming direct talks with the Georgian side. The Permanent Representative of Russia to the United Nations Vitaly Churkin also said Moscow opposed the meeting of the Group of Friends in Berlin.

== Active involvement ==
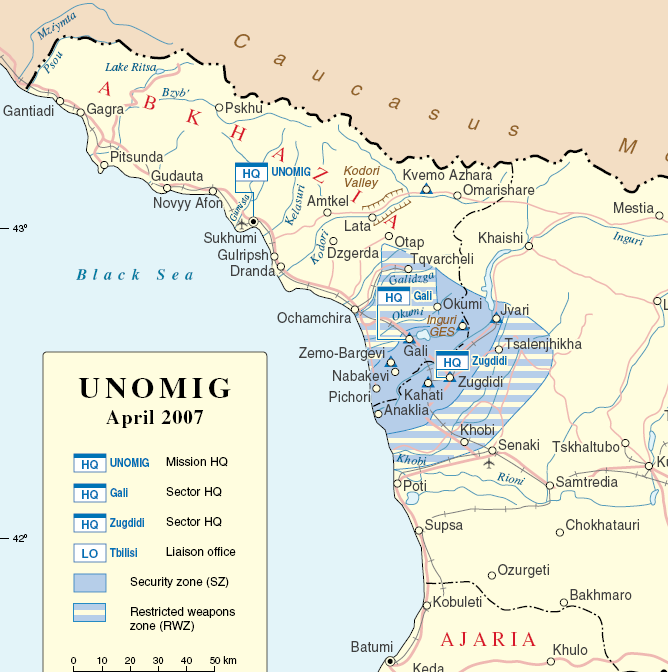
Map showing security zone

German military observers and paramedics served in the Georgia/Abkhazia crisis zone as part of the United Nations Observer Mission in Georgia (UNOMIG). The German involvement started in 1993. The doctors and paramedics from the German Armed Forces provide medical support to UNOMIG Sukhumi Headquarters and to the Gali and Zugdidi sectors. From 1993 until 2002, the head of UNOMIG was Dieter Boden from Germany.

As an observer mission, UNOMIG played no effective role in preventing the conflict between Russia and Georgia that broke out in August 2008.

Germany has provided continued funding to HALO Trust, which implements demining operations in Abkhazia, and funding for other reconstruction efforts and improvements in sanitation, health and education. German observers reportedly monitored the March 2007 elections for the Abkhaz Parliament.

== See also ==
- Georgia–Germany relations
