= Abkhazia–Turkey relations =

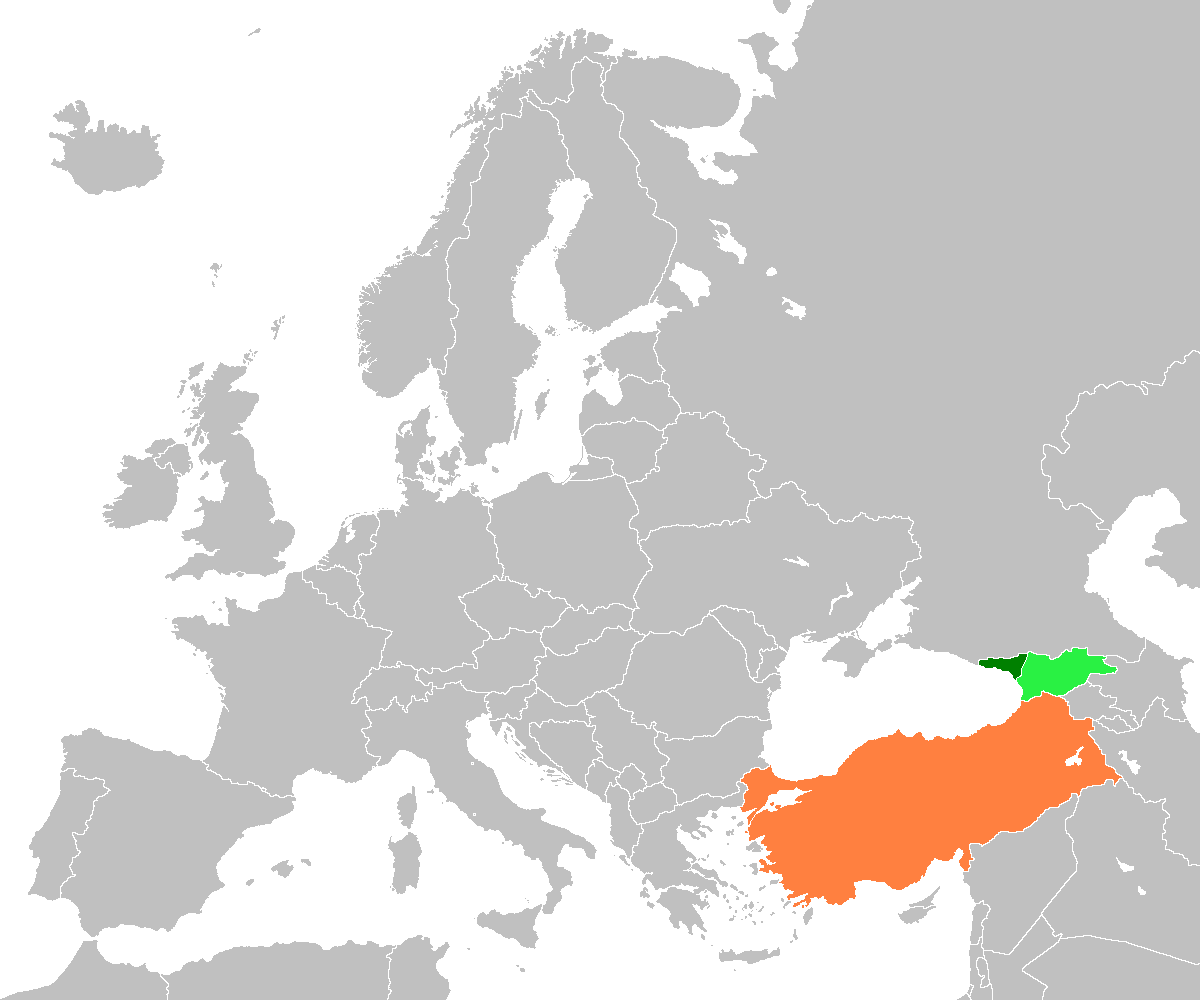

- Abkhazia: Turkey

Relations between Abkhazia and Turkey have not been not officially established. Although Turkey has not recognized Abkhazia's independence and regards it as de jure part of Georgia, the two governments reportedly have secret ties.

== History ==
On 22 September 1996, Turkey announced that residents of Abkhazia would no longer be allowed to travel to Turkey on Soviet-era identification documents, and would instead have to obtain Georgian passports.

In July 2009, Abkhazian Foreign Minister Sergei Shamba said that the Abkhazian government has certain contacts with the government of Turkey; negotiations on resumption of air and sea communication are being held.

Officially, the Turkish government did not want to antagonize its neighbor and important trading partner Georgia. It is also why Turkey allegedly maintained a strict trade embargo on Abkhazia. In 2009, several Turkish ships heading to Abkhazia have been seized by Georgian naval forces in international waters due to the Georgian sea blockade of Abkhazia.

There is a large Abkhaz diaspora consisting of the descendants of the Abkhaz who fled or were expelled from Abkhazia in the 19th century.

== Bilateral contacts ==
In 1994, Abkhazia established the post of a plenipotentiary representative of the Republic of Abkhazia in the Turkish Republic.

In September 2009, the Foreign Ministry Deputy Undersecretary Ünal Çeviköz went to the Abkhaz capital of Sukhumi, where he met with Abkhaz officials. This was the first visit to Abkhazia of a foreign national diplomat since the August 2008 war.

The importance of the Turkish factor in Abkhaz policy was demonstrated by the first visit by President Bagapsh to Ankara in April 2011.

Turkey's ambassador to Georgia, Murat Buhran, stated in 2014 that Turkey and Abkhazia had established a special group to deepen “bilateral” ties.

In 2021, Abkhazia appointed a new Plenipotentiary Representative of Abkhazia in Turkey. Ibrakhim Avidzba previously worked for the State Security Service of Abkhazia.

== Trade ==
Today, Turkey is Abkhazia's second-most important trade partner with about 18 percent of Abkhazia's trade turnover.

In 2016, Abkhazia joined sanctions imposed by Russia on Turkey.

In 2020, the Turkish banks Ziraat Bank and İşbank began servicing the Abkhaz credit card system APRA. The Georgian foreign ministry responded by stating that the Abkhaz APRA cards are regular Russian Mir cards.

== See also ==
- Foreign relations of Abkhazia
- Foreign relations of Turkey
