= Sochi conflict =

1918–1919 military conflict between the Democratic Republic of Georgia and Russia

- Part of World War I and Russian Civil War
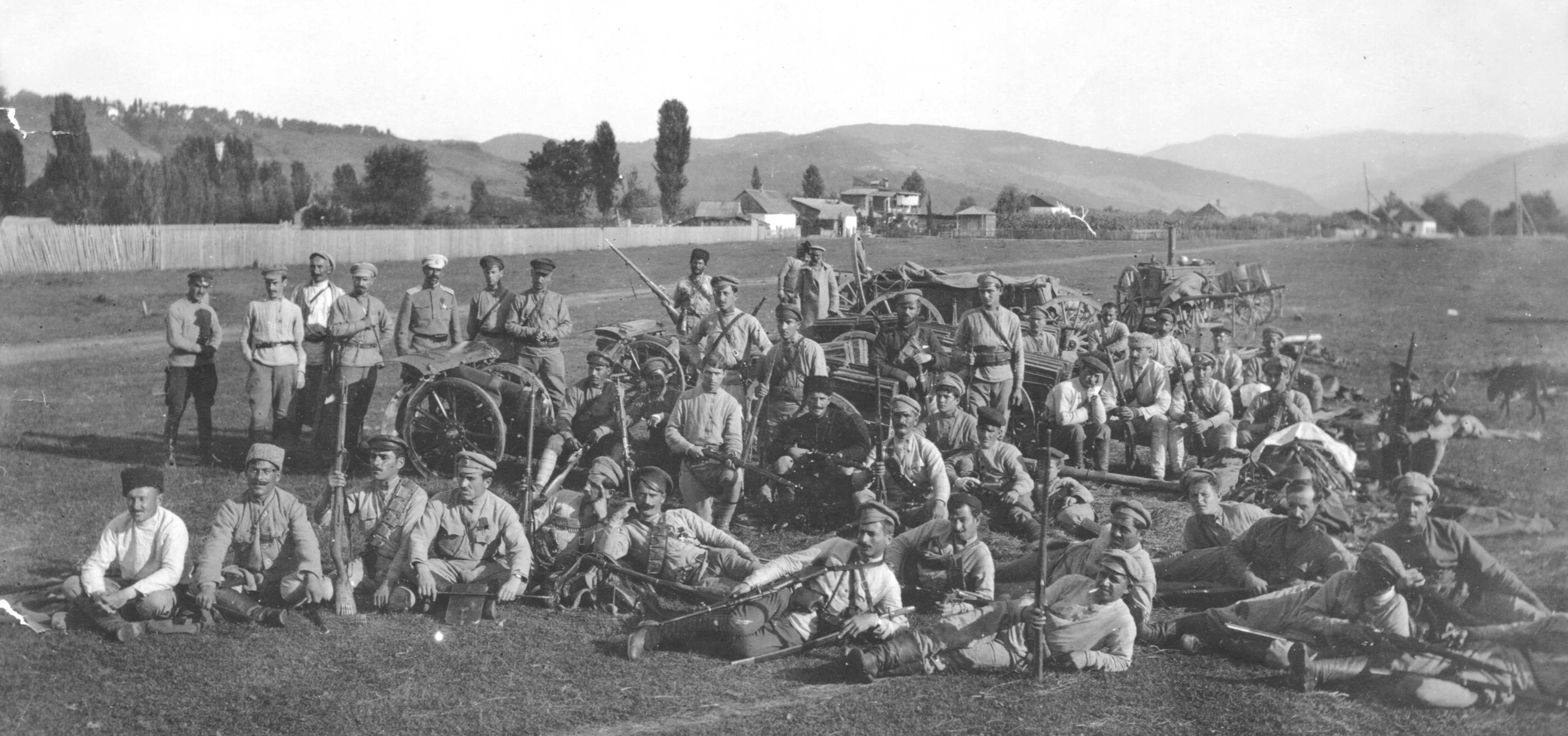
- Georgian artillerymen in Sochi, 1919
Date	29 June 1918 – 24 May 1919
Location	Sochinsky okrug, Black Sea Governorate
Result	Inconclusive
Territorial changes	The border between Georgia and Russia is established along the Psou river

Belligerents
(Georgia (country)) Georgia: Abkhaz National Council; Military support: German Empire; Green armies	Russian SFSR: Abkhaz Bolsheviks; (Russia) White movement: Volunteer Army (until 8 Jan 1919); Armed Forces of South Russia (from 8 Jan 1919)

Commanders and leaders
(Georgia (country)) Giorgi Mazniashvili (Georgia (country)) Ioseb Gedevanishvili (Georgia (country)) Valiko Jugheli (German Empire) Friedrich Kress von Kressenstein	(Russian Soviet Federative Socialist Republic) Yepifan Kovtyukh; Efrem Eshba (Russia) Anton Denikin

Strength
5,000–6,000 In April	2.600 In April

Casualties and losses
Unknown	Unknown

The Sochi conflict was a three-party armed conflict which involved the counterrevolutionary White Russian forces, Bolshevik Red Army and the Democratic Republic of Georgia, each of which sought control over the strategic Black Sea town of Sochi. The conflict was fought as a part of the Russian Civil War and lasted with varying success from June 1918 to May 1919, and ended through British mediation.

== Background ==
Georgian claims came from the fact that the area was politically dominated by the medieval Kingdom of Georgia at the height of its prestige and strength, and then came under the rule of a successor, the Kingdom of Imereti and, eventually, the Principality of Abkhazia. The area of increasing tourist interest, part of this region was detached by the Tsar's decree of December 25, 1904, from the Sukhumi district (Kutais Governorate) to become part of the Black Sea Governorate. The region was inhabited by a significant number of Armenians and Georgians.

According to Peter Kenez, "The collapse of the Turkish front, which resulted directly from the fall of the Provisional Government, meant a great danger to this area: Georgians and Armenians, traditional enemies of the Turks, remained defenseless. Politicians formed a federal government, the Transcaucasian Commissariat, with the participation of Georgians, Armenians, Azerbaijanis, and Russians in order to cope with the immediate problems of the area and to organize some sort of defense." After the Treaty of Brest-Litovsk, each member of the federation declared their own independence. Kenez states, "Whatever the Georgian Mensheviks felt about the Germans, the Republic desperately needed their help; they were the only force with the means to restrain the Turks. Indeed the German Command pressured the Turks into accepting a reasonable treaty with Georgia. German troops soon arrived and took possession of the most important roads and railways."

The Russian general Anton Denikin and his colleagues insisted, however, that the border between Georgia (though not yet recognized by either White or Soviet leadership) and the White-controlled Kuban People's Republic should be that between the former Russian governorates of Kutais and Black Sea, i.e. slightly in the north to the Bzyb River.

== Conflict ==
The conflict was preceded by a pro-Bolshevik revolt in Abkhazia. In March 1918, local Bolsheviks in Abkhazia under the leadership of Nestor Lakoba, a close associate of Joseph Stalin, capitalized on agrarian disturbances and, supported by the revolutionary peasant militias, kiaraz, won power in Sukhumi in April 1918. The Transcaucasian Democratic Federative Republic, which claimed the region as its part, sanctioned the suppression of the revolt and, on May 17, the National Guard of Georgia ousted the Bolshevik commune in Sukhumi.

Another revolt took place in June 1918 that made the local Abkhazian government, Abkhaz People's Council, which emerged after the February Revolution in Russia, to request aid from the Democratic Republic of Georgia and join it as an autonomous entity (June 8, 1918). A Georgian force under Major General Giorgi Mazniashvili was deployed in the region and joined by Abkhaz cavalry provided by local nobility. Mazniashvili repulsed a Bolshevik offensive from Sochi late in June.

The Georgians armed the Kuban Cossacks, and prevented a Red Army advance south along the Black Sea coast. By the middle of July the Georgians had occupied Tuapse. Mazniashvili was soon ordered to take control of the Tuapse-Maykop railway line, the Caspian oil pipeline, and Sochi. Denikin sent E.V. Maslovskii as Volunteer Army's representative. Kenez states, "The first month in the history of the relations between the Volunteer Army and Georgia was the best." The Volunteer Army helped stop a Bolshevik advance on Tuapse, after the Georgians retreated to Sochi.

On September 18, a Council for Sochi (a legislature formed by the local Mensheviks and SRs in August) declared the unification of the city and its district to the Democratic Republic of Georgia as a "temporary measure" against the threats from both Lenin and Denikin. The annexation by Georgia followed immediately and caused an acute protest from the leaders of the White forces.

On September 25–26, 1918, the Volunteer Army met in Ekaterinodar with the a Georgian delegation consisting of E. P. Gegechkori, foreign minister, and General G. I. Mazniashvili. The main issue discussed at the conference was the possession of Sochi. However, negotiatians broke off without an agreement after heated exchanges. According to Kenez, "The Ekaterinodar meeting set the pattern for future relations. The history of these relations is a dreary series of bitter exchanges, border skirmishes, and at times even large-scale fighting."

On February 6, 1919, the Georgian troops were forced back to the Bzyb river with their commander General Konyev (Koniashvili), and his staff captured by the Russians at Gagra. Georgia sent reinforcements, but the British representatives intervened establishing a demarcation line along the Bzyb. The captured Georgian officers were released. On March 14, 1919, a Georgian delegation presented at Paris peace conference a project of the borders of the country in which it demanded a part of the former Black Sea province up to the small river Makopse 14 km southeast to the town Tuapse. The negotiations, however, yielded no results.

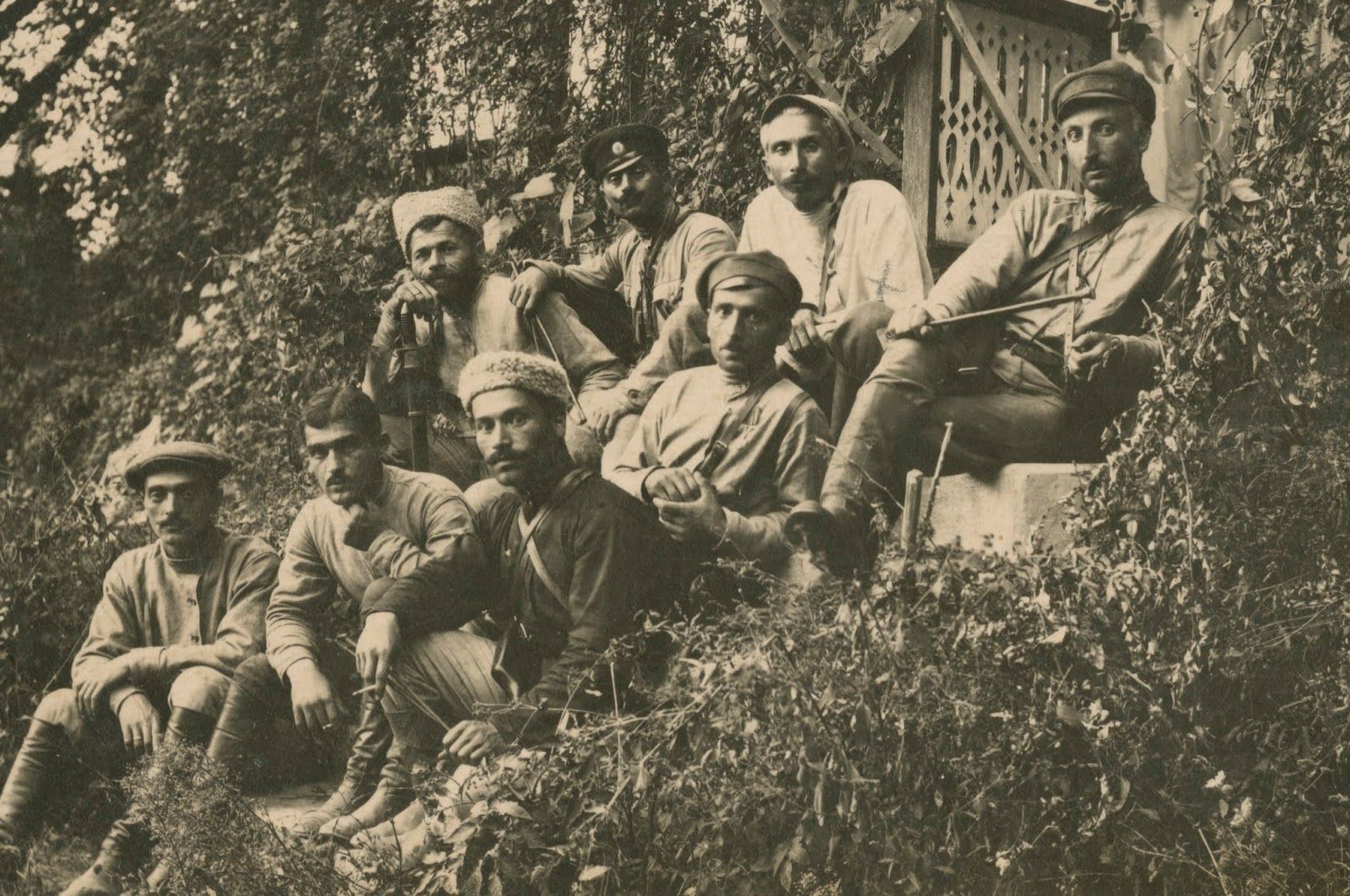
Soldiers of the People's Guard of Georgia and their commander Valiko Jugheli (far Left) in Gagra, 1919

On April 12, 1919, a Sukhumi-based Georgian People's Guard and army units under General Mazniashvili launched a counteroffensive. Avoiding the British peacekeeping posts at the Bzyb river, they retook Gagra after a bloody clash and, in cooperation with the "Green" Russian guerillas, moved to the Mekhadiri river. The British intervention however halted the Georgian advance. A new demarcation line was established south to Adler, on the Psou River. Along the border, a British expeditionary force took positions to prevent further outbreak of the war. On May 23–24, Georgian, Russian Volunteers' and British representatives met in Tbilisi to find a peace resolution. Actually, this was the end of the conflict. Occasional skirmishes occurred, however, until the late 1919.

The establishment of the current official Russian-Georgian border along the Psou was perhaps the main outcome of the Sochi conflict. The new border was de jure recognized by the Russian Soviet Federated Socialist Republic (May 1920) and the Allies (January 1921).

== See also ==
- Aftermath of World War I

== Bibliography ==
- R. H. Ullman, Britain and the Russian Civil War (Princeton, 1968), pp. 219–20
- Georgian-Abkhaz relations in 1918–1921, article by A. Menteshashvili
