= People's Guard of Georgia =

Volunteer military unit, 1917–1921

- საქართველოს სახალხო გვარდია
- Coat of arms of the People's Guard of Georgia
- Active: 5 September, 1917 — 18 March, 1921
- Country: (Georgia (country)) Democratic Republic of Georgia
- Size: 10,000–12,000 war time strength
- Engagements: Georgian–Ossetian conflicts of 1918-1920; Red Army invasion of Georgia

Commanders
- Notable commanders: Valiko Jugheli

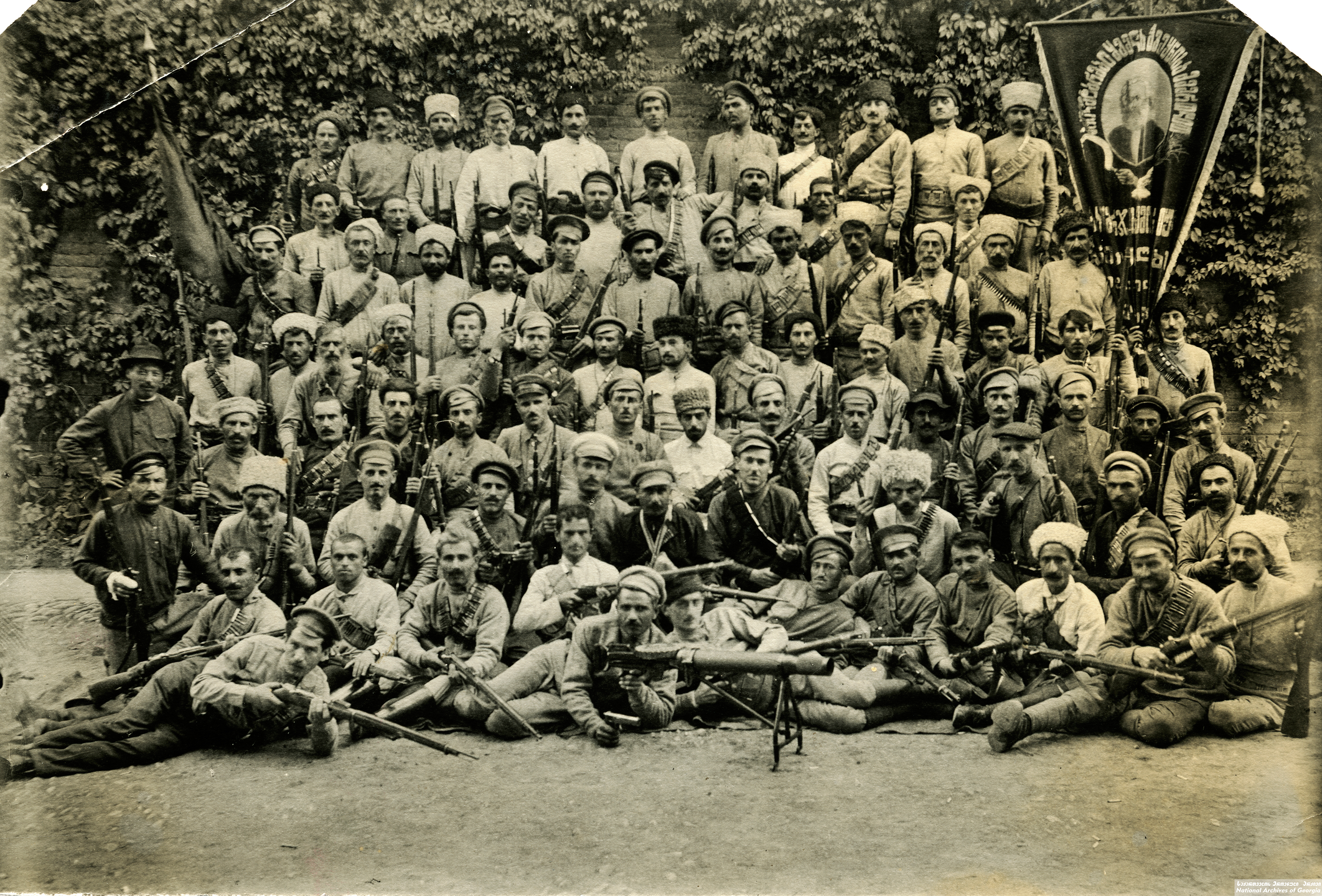
The People's Guard of Georgia

The People's Guard of Georgia (Georgian: საქართველოს სახალხო გვარდია) was a Social-Democrat-dominated volunteer force of Georgian former soldiers and civilians, active during the Russian Revolution of 1917 and the Democratic Republic of Georgia from 5 September 1917 to 18 March 1921. It consisted of 2,000 full-time members and 18 field battalions (300–800 soldiers in each) drafted on a territorial basis. In wartime it could mobilize up to 10,000 to 12,000 citizens. The commander of the People's Guard was Valiko Jugheli, and notable members included Kakutsa Cholokashvili, Alexander Koniashvili, Alexander Maisuradze, and Vladimer Goguadze.

The People's Guard of Georgia conducted its first combat mission on 29 November (N.S. 12 December) 1917, when it seized a former Imperial Russian army arsenal and artillery depot in Tiflis which had hitherto been under the control of units sympathetic to the Bolsheviks. In the words of a Guard commander, Valiko Jugheli, the operation "determined the fate of the revolution on a Transcaucasian scale." Throughout 1918–1921, 12 December was celebrated as the Guard's day. From 1920 to 1921, the Guard published its illustrated periodical sakhalkho gvardieli (სახალხო გვარდიელი, "People's Guardsman") twice a month.

== See also ==
- Regular Army of the Georgian Democratic Republic
