= Efrem Eshba =

- Ефрем Алексеевич Эшба (Russian)
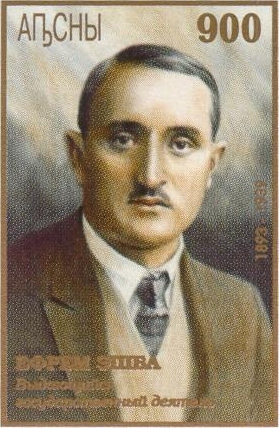
- Eshba on a 1997 Abkhaz stamp

Chairman of the Revolutionary Committee of Abkhazia
- In office February 1921 – February 1922
- Preceded by: Post Created
- Succeeded by: Post Abolished

Chairman of the Central Executive Committee of the SSR Abkhazia
- In office February 1922 – 1922
- Preceded by: Post Created
- Succeeded by: Samson Kartoziya

People's Commissar of Justice of the Georgian SSR
- In office October 1922 – December 1922
- Preceded by: Sergey Kavtaradze
- Succeeded by: Yakov Vardzieli

First Secretary of the Chechen Autonomous Oblast
- In office January 1926 – August 1927
- Preceded by: Magomed Eneyev
- Succeeded by: Gurgen Bulat

Personal details
- Born: 7 March 1893 Agubedia, Sukhum Okrug, Kutais Governorate, Russian Empire
- Died: 16 April 1939 (aged 46) Kommunarka, Moscow Oblast, Soviet Union
- Citizenship: Soviet
- Party: Communist Party of the Soviet Union

Efrem Alekseevich Eshba (Russian: Ефрем Алексеевич Эшба; 19 March [O.S. 7 March] 1893 – 16 April, 1939) was an Abkhaz and Soviet statesman and leading Bolshevik in Abkhazia in the 1920s.

== Life ==
=== Education ===
Eshba graduated from the Sukhumi Mountain School and the Tiflis Gymnasium. He studied law at Moscow University. During his studies at the university, he became a Marxist, joining the Bolsheviks in 1914.

=== Political career ===
He was elected Chairman of the Sukhum District Committee of the RSDLP(B) in 1917, and was a Special Commissioner in the People's Commissariat for Nationalities of the RSFSR.

In 1921 he wrote to the Caucasian Bureau of the Central Committee of the RCP (b) to oppose a merger of Abkhazia with Georgia.

=== Arrest and execution ===
In 1936, he was arrested by the NKVD, and was sentenced to death in 1939. He was executed, and posthumously rehabilitated during the process of destalinization.
