= Valiko Jugheli =

Georgian politician and military commander

- ვალიკო ჯუღელი
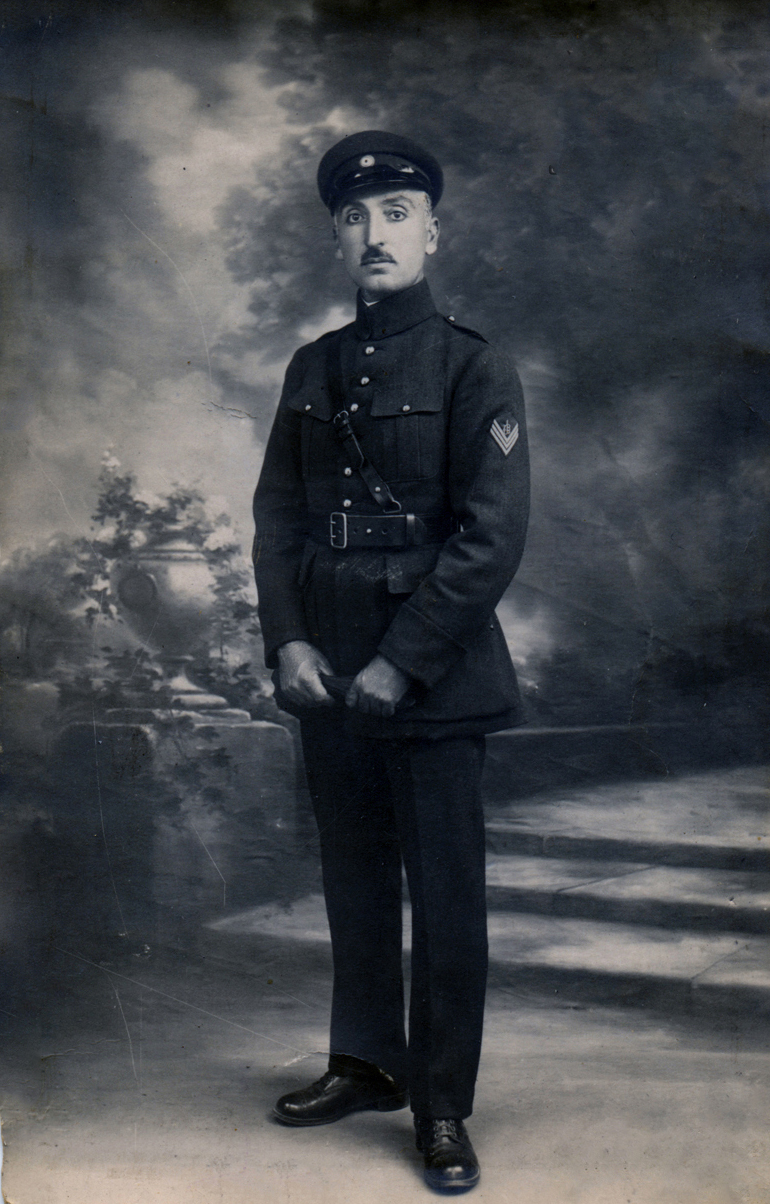
- Born: 1 January 1887; Sviri, Kutaisi Governorate, Russian Empire (Russia) (now (Georgia (country)) Georgia)
- Died: 30 August 1924 (aged 37)
- Military career
- Allegiance: Transcaucasian Federation (1918); Democratic Republic of Georgia (1918–1921); Committee for the Independence of Georgia (1922–1924)
- Service years: 1917–1921
- Conflicts: Abkhazia conflict (1918); Sochi conflict Armeno-Georgian War; Georgian–Ossetian conflict Red Army invasion of Georgia

Valerian “Valiko” Jugheli (Georgian: ვალიკო ჯუღელი) (January 1, 1887 – 30 August 1924) was a Georgian politician and military commander.

He was involved in the Marxist movement in Georgia (then part of the Russian Empire) at the beginning of the 20th century. After the split within the Russian Social Democratic Labour Party, to which he was a member, Jugheli sided with the Bolsheviks, but later defected to the Menshevik faction and became an influential member. After the Russian Revolution of 1917, he organized the Red Guard detachment which was later renamed into the People's Guard of Georgia. On November 29, 1917, he successfully commanded a raid on the Tiflis military arsenal guarded by the pro-Bolshevik Russian soldiers led by Stepan Shahumyan, the ethnic Armenian Bolshevik. In May 1918, he was reluctant to support the proclamation of Georgia's independence, but still retained his post. As a commander of the People's Guard, he was commonly assigned to retain an internal order in the country. During his tenure, he gained a reputation of a ruthless suppressor of Bolshevik uprisings in Ossetian-populated regions of Georgia.

Valerian "Valiko" Jugheli and his family were evacuated from Sokhumi to Kutaisi, after the First World War broke out due to the fear of an inevitable Ottoman invasion. Valiko Jugheli successfully completed his work called "Heavy Cross", where his life in the Democratic Republic of Georgia is more informative than before. After the Soviet occupation of Georgia in 1921, Jugheli went to the École spéciale militaire de Saint-Cyr for military education. After this event, he returned to Soviet-occupied Georgia and joined an unsuccessful rebellion against Soviet occupation forces. 36 years old, Jugheli was soon arrested and executed by the Soviet Cheka on 30 August 1924.
