= Georgian–Polish alliance =

The Georgian–Polish alliance was a short-lived alliance (1920–1921) between the Democratic Republic of Georgia and the Second Polish Republic.

== History ==
Georgia had gained its independence following the 1917 Russian Revolution; Poland, a year later, following World War I. Both countries had a history of problematic relations with their Russian neighbor. Polish leader Józef Piłsudski wanted to create a large East-European Międzymorze federation for common defense. He saw Georgia as a possible candidate for such an alliance.

Plans for a Polish diplomatic mission to the Caucasus, to the new countries of Georgia, Armenia and Azerbaijan, had been laid as early as April 1918 but began to be realized only in March 1920. By that time, a Polish brigade (Polska Oddzielna Brygada) had been formed of the Polish soldiers of the Russian army serving in the Caucasus. This brigade played an important role in keeping order at Tiflis, capital of the nascent Georgian republic. The brigade was disbanded under the German pressure in June 1918. Most of its personnel joined the Polish 4th Rifle Division of General Lucjan Żeligowski in Odessa and then returned to Poland.

In 1920, Polish Minister of Foreign Affairs Stanisław Patek sent a message to Georgia, proposing an exchange of diplomatic representatives and improved relations. The Georgians, threatened by Russian revolutionary factions and by Turkey, enthusiastically accepted the proposal. Soon after, Polish Deputy Minister of Foreign Affairs Tytus Filipowicz visited Tbilisi with a diplomatic mission.

Plans for a Polish-Georgian military alliance were drafted to have included Polish aid (equipment and munitions) for the Georgian military. Before the treaty was ratified, the Red Army invaded Georgia. Deputy Minister Filipowicz (who had been named to be Polish ambassador to Georgia) was arrested in Baku, when the Red Army invaded Azerbaijan about the same time. Polish personnel in Georgia, led by Wiktor Białobrzeski, managed to create a provisional consular office before Georgia was annexed by the Soviet Union in 1921.

== Aftermath ==
After the Soviet invasion of Georgia, the good Polish-Georgian relations resulted in large-scale Georgian emigration to Poland. Among the Georgians who moved to Poland, were parents of general John Shalikashvili (the general himself was born in Warsaw). Poland aided Georgian pro-independence activists for many years. Several Georgian officers were enlisted in the Polish Army in the interbellum, with such names as Zakaria Bakradze, Alexandre Chkheidze, Ivane Kazbegi, Viktor Lomidze and Valerian Tevzadze. All Georgian officers were sharing the privileges of the military and enjoyed a good relationship with their Polish fellow officers.

== See also ==
- Międzymorze (Intermarium)
- Prometheism
- Polish–Romanian alliance
- Polish–Ukrainian alliance
- Georgians in Poland
