= List of people associated with the Democratic Republic of Georgia =

This is an incomplete alphabetical list of the Georgian people active in the short-lived Democratic Republic of Georgia (DRG), 1918-1921.

== A ==
- Aslan-Beg Abashidze, general
- Shalva Abdushelishvili, Member of Parliament from the Social Democratic Party
- Kote Abkhazi, general
- Stepane Akhmeteli, general
- Iason Akhvlediani, general
- Shalva Aleksi-Meskhishvili
- Ambrosi, Catholicos Patriarch of All Georgia
- Alexander Andronikashvili, general
- Spiridon Andronikashvili, general
- Giorgi Arjevanidze, general
- David Artmeladze, general
- Razhden Arsenidze, Social Democrat, Minister of Justice
- Sosipatre Asatiani, Social Democrat, Chairman of the Georgian Legation in Paris
- Zurab Avalishvili, historian, diplomat

== B ==
- Zakaria Bakradze, general
- Andria Benashvili, general

== C ==
- Alexandre Chkheidze, colonel, later Major General in the Polish service
- Nikolay Chkheidze, former President of the Transcaucasian Sejm, President of the Georgian delegation for the Peace conference in Paris, President of the Constitutional Assembly of Georgia
- Akaki Chkhenkeli, former President of Transcaucasian government, Minister of Foreign Affairs of Georgia
- Benia Chkhikvishvili, Social Democrat, former President of Gurian Republic, Mayor of Tbilisi, shot by the Bolsheviks in 1924
- Parmen Chichinadze, politician, Minister of War
- Kakutsa Cholokashvili, colonel, National Hero of Georgia

== D ==
- Ioseb Dadiani, MP from the National Democratic Party
- Seit Devdariani, MP from the Social Democratic Party

== E ==
- Giorgi Eradze, Social Democrat, Minister of Labour

== G ==
- Revaz Gabashvili, author, MP from the National Democratic Party
- Konstantine Gamsakhurdia, writer, diplomat
- Nestor Gardapkhadze, general
- Ioseb Gedevanishvili (ka), general, Social Federalist Party
- Evgeni Gegechkori, former President of the Transcaucasian government, Minister of Foreign Affairs of Georgia
- David Ghambashidze, mining engineer, diplomat, author.
- Grigol Giorgadze, Social Democrat, Minister of War
- Ivane Gomarteli, Social Democrat politician
- Vladimir Goguadze, Social Democrat, National Guard officer
- Elizbar Gulisashvili, colonel
- Giorgi Gvazava, MP from the National Democratic Party

== J ==
- Iason Javakhishvili, MP from the National Democratic Party
- Ivane Javakhishvili, historian, MP
- Artem Jijikhia, general
- Valiko Jugheli, Social Democrat, Head of National Guard, shot by the Bolsheviks in 1924
- Giorgi Juruli, National Democrat, Minister of Finance, Trade and Industry

== K ==
- Konstantine Kandelaki, Social Democrat, minister of Finance
- Parnaoz Karalashvili, colonel
- Meliton Kartsivadze, MP from the Social Democratic Party
- Kale Kavtaradze, MP from the Social Democratic Party
- Giorgi Kazbegi, retired general and public figure
- Ivane Kazbegi, general
- Spiridon Kedia, MP from National Democrat Party
- Leo Kereselidze, general
- Giorgi Khimshiashvili, colonel
- Noe Khomeriki, Social Democrat, Minister of Agriculture, shot by the Bolsheviks in 1924
- Akaki Khoshtaria, oil magnate
- Giorgi Kvinitadze, general

== L ==
- Giorgi Laskhishvili, Social Federalist, Minister of Education
- Alexandre Lomtatitdze, MP from the Social Democratic Party
- Ivane Lordkipanidze, National Democrat, minister of Railways

== M ==
- Shalva Meskhishvili, Social Federalist, minister of Justice
- Shalva Maglakelidze, colonel
- Abel Makashvili, general
- Giorgi Mazniashvili, general
- Vlasa Mgeladze, MP of Social Democratic Party
- Rostom Muskhelishvili, colonel

== N ==
- Levan Natadze, MP from the Social Democratic Party
- Niko Nikoladze, journalist, Honorary Chairman of the National Democratic Party

== P ==
- Samson Pirtskhalava, MP from the Social Federalist Party, vice-president of Constitutional Assembly

== R ==
- Grigol Robakidze, writer, diplomat
- Noe Ramishvili, first head of government, Minister of Interior

== S ==
- Datiko Sharashidze, MP for the Social Democratic Party
- Kristine Sharashidze, MP from the Social Democratic Party
- Peri-Khan Sofieva, MP from Socialist-Federalist Revolutionary Party and first female elected deputy in Muslim history
- Petre Surguladze, politician from the National Democratic Party

== T ==
- Ekvtime Takaishvili, historian, MP from the National Democratic Party, vice-president of Constitutional Assembly
- Victor Tevzaia, Social Democrat, ambassador to Ukraine
- Alexandre Tsereteli, MP from the Social Federalist Party
- Erekle Tsereteli, colonel
- Irakli Tsereteli, Social Democrat, plenipotentiary Minister, vice-president of Georgian delegation to Peace conference in Paris
- Mikheil Tsereteli, politician, former anarchist
- Svimon Tsereteli, colonel
- Vasil Tsereteli, MP from the National Democratic Party
- Grigol Tsintsadze, captain, 1924 uprising
- Noe Tsintsadze, Social Democrat, Minister of Youth
- Varden Tsulukidze, general

== U ==
- Grigol Uratadze, Social Democrat, Foreign Affairs Secretary

== V ==
- David Vachnadze, colonel, MP from the National Democratic Party

== Z ==
- Solomon Zaldastanishvili, colonel
- Noe Zhordania, speaker of National Council of Georgia, chairman of the second and third governments
- Ivane Zourabichvili, National Democrat.

== See also ==
- Georgian emigration in Poland
