= Georgia–Poland relations =

- Georgia: Poland

Georgia–Poland relations refers to the bilateral relations between Georgia and Poland. Both nations enjoy close and historically friendly relations, rooted in similar experiences, solidarity and shared struggles against foreign imperialism, especially that of Russia. Georgia has an embassy in Warsaw. Poland has an embassy in Tbilisi. Both countries are full members of the OSCE, the Council of Europe, the World Trade Organization and the United Nations. Poland is a member of the EU, which Georgia applied for in 2022.

== History ==
=== Early history ===
The documented ties between Georgia and Poland reach back to the 15th century, when the Georgian (Kartlian) King Konstantin sent a diplomatic mission to the Polish King Alexander Jagiellon. Later, Polish King Jan III Sobieski tried to establish contacts with Georgia. Many Georgians participated in military campaigns led by Poland in the 17th century. Bogdan Gurdziecki, a Georgian, who was the greatest authority on all things Persian working in the Polish king's diplomatic service, made frequent diplomatic trips to Persia, on which he obtained, among other things, guarantees upholding earlier privileges for missionaries. Already during the rule of King John II Casimir Vasa, he sent on missions to Isfahan, and King Jan III Sobieski availed himself of Gurdziecki's talents in like manner (in 1668, 1671, 1676–1678, in 1682–1684, and in 1687). Gurdziecki remained at the court of the shah for several years in the capacity of special resident and representative of the Polish king; it was he who delivered to the shah Suleiman news about the victory of the Polish-led Christian forces at Vienna (1683).

=== Georgian and Polish fights for independence ===
In the late 18th century, Poland lost its independence in the course of the Partitions of Poland, and its territory was annexed by Prussia (later Germany), Russia and Austria, while Georgia was annexed by Russia in the 19th century. Since then, the history of the two nations was intertwined and there were migrations, often forced, in both directions. Already in 1794, the Russians were sending captured Polish prisoners of war from the Kościuszko Uprising to the Caucasus region, including Georgia. Following the partitions and then following the unsuccessful Polish November Uprising of 1830–1831, many Poles who were forcibly conscripted to the Russian Army were sent to Georgia. In 1832, the Russians discovered a Georgian independence conspiracy and then deported some of its participants to the Russian Partition of Poland. Among them was Giorgi Eristavi, Georgian poet and playwright, who learned Polish during his exile and later translated poems of the Polish national poet Adam Mickiewicz into Georgian. Since the 1830s, Polish officials, teachers, midwives, craftsmen, merchants and doctors also settled in Georgia, and many married local Georgians. About 4,000 Poles, mostly soldiers, lived in Georgia as of 1840. By the mid-19th century, Polish communities existed in various Georgian cities, including Tbilisi, Kutaisi, Gori, Signagi, and Telavi. In 1870 a Polish Catholic church was built in Tbilisi, which served its Polish community. Poles in Georgia were under the watchful eye of the Russian authorities, as they were constantly considered a potential threat.

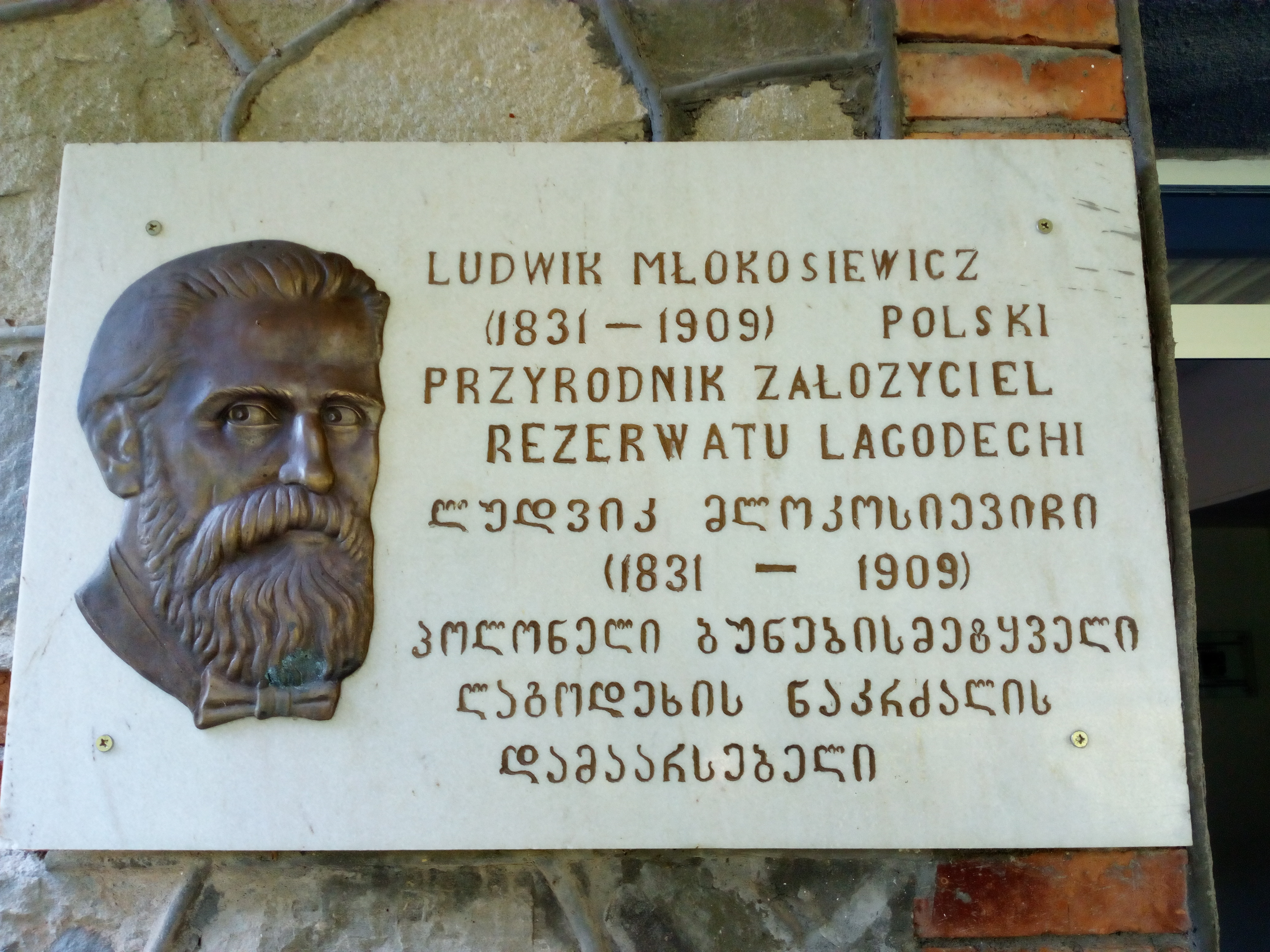
Memorial plaque to Ludwik Młokosiewicz in Lagodekhi

Poles made great contributions in the fields of architecture, geography, arts, botany and zoology in Georgia. In the 1840s, Pole Władysław Bahrynowski established a botanical garden in Sukhumi. Great contributions to the botany and zoology of Georgia were made by Ludwik Młokosiewicz, a Pole, who initially came to Lagodekhi in 1853 to do his compulsory military service in the Russian Army, but eventually stayed permanently. Młokosiewicz discovered various species of plants and animals on Georgian soil, and founded the Lagodekhi Protected Areas. He invented a method to eradicate malaria in Georgia, which earned him widespread respect among the Georgian people. Młokosiewicz also expanded the knowledge of Georgian fauna and flora in Poland by maintaining contacts with museums and institutions in Warsaw, to which he sent Georgian botanical and zoological specimens, as well as through scientific publications.

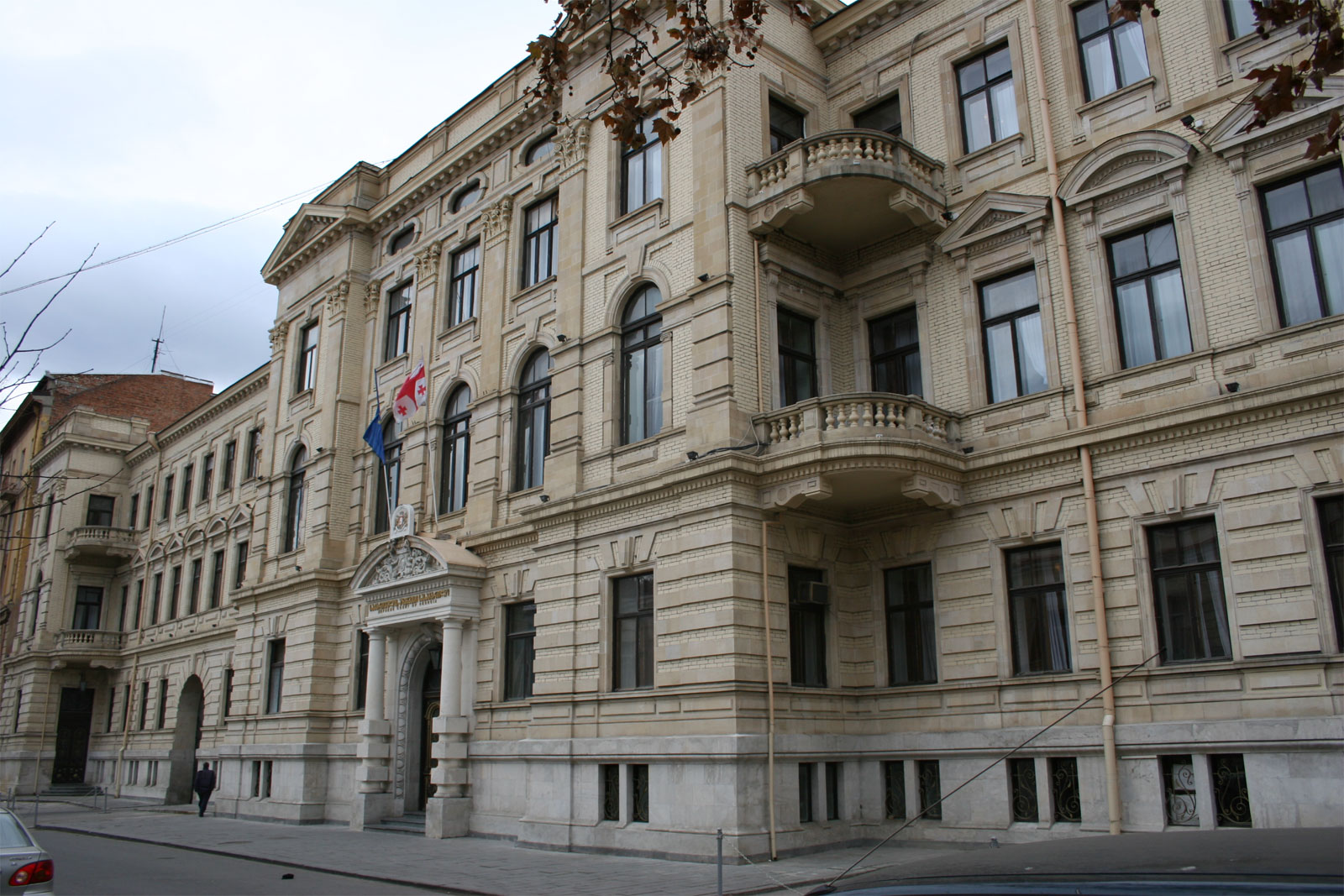
Supreme Court of Georgia designed by Aleksander Szymkiewicz

Józef Chodźko conducted pioneering geographical and geodetic surveys of Georgian lands. Polish architects worked in various Georgian cities, including Tbilisi, Kutaisi, Batumi, Poti and Sukhumi, designing many residential houses as well as theaters, schools, courts, incl. the present Supreme Court of Georgia. Aleksander Szymkiewicz even became a city councillor and the municipal architect of Tbilisi, while Józef Kognowicki became the municipal engineer of Tbilisi, responsible for constructing the city's modern water supply and sewage system. Polish architects were also involved in the restoration of historic Georgian churches, and contributed to the construction of roads and railroads and the expansion of seaports in Poti, Batumi and Sukhumi. Ferdynand Rydzewski headed the construction of the Surami Tunnel under the Surami Pass, the longest railroad tunnel in the Caucasus. Before 1914 about 500 Poles were employed in the construction of railroads, roads, bridges, public buildings and pipelines on Georgian lands. Polish artists (musicians, writers, painters) also lived in Georgian cities, some being founders or co-founders of art schools in Tbilisi. Polish painter Zygmunt Waliszewski spent his youth in Batumi and Tbilisi, and the first years of his career in Tbilisi, before returning to Poland after it regained independence.

In 1863, Petre Nakashidze, future Georgian lecturer and activist, was an eyewitness of the Polish January Uprising in the Russian Partition of Poland. His accounts began to be published by the Georgian press, but after the first part was published, the Russian censorship intervened and stopped the publication of the subsequent parts. A fundraising for Polish insurgents was organized in Tbilisi in the spring of 1863. In the second half of the 19th century, some ethnic Georgian officers and officials were sent to the Russian Partition of Poland. The commander of the Dęblin and Warsaw fortresses was Ivane Kazbegi, who later settled in restored independent Poland in the interbellum and joined the Polish Army. Young Georgians came to study in Warsaw, where they sought inspiration and examples for their national liberation activity. In Warsaw, Georgian students founded the League for the Liberation of Georgia, which was discovered by Russians and its members were arrested, including future writer Shio Aragvispireli. Future leader of independent Georgia and then the Georgian government-in-exile Noe Zhordania studied at the Veterinary Institute in Warsaw.

=== Interwar alliance and World War II ===
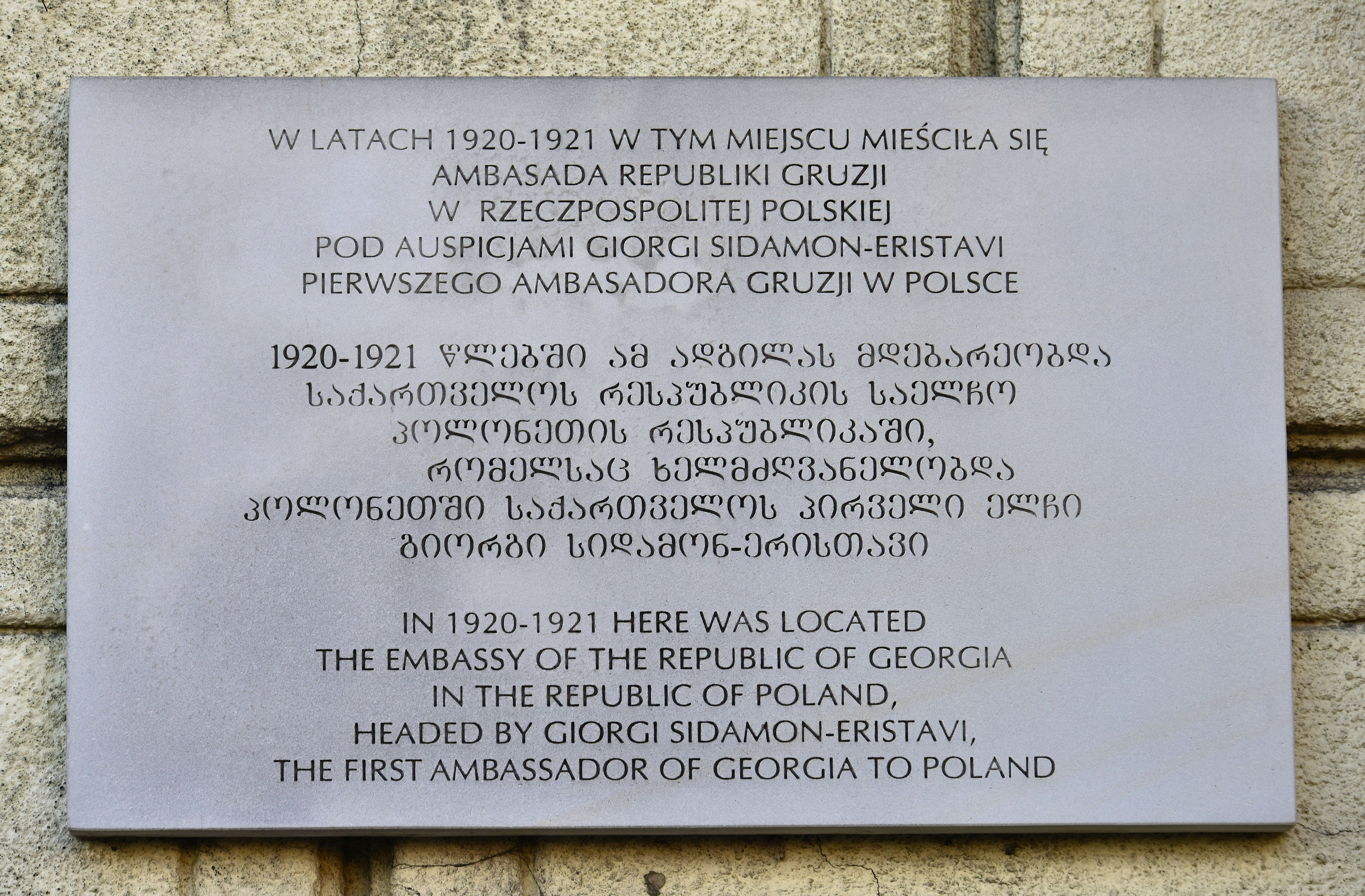
Plaque at the location of the Embassy of Georgia in Warsaw in 1920–1921

Both countries regained independence in 1918. In 1918, the Polish Regency Council sent diplomat Wacław Ostrowski to Georgia. Ostrowski organized a Polish consular agency in Tbilisi and began talks with Noe Zhordania on a military alliance. In 1920 the consular agency was upgraded into a consulate, and then in 1921 into a consulate general with a plan to further upgrade it into an embassy. Poland and Georgia had established good relations and signed an alliance. Both countries were invaded by Soviet Russia. Poland successfully repelled the Russian invasion and secured its independence, but Georgia was conquered. Poland maintained contacts with the Georgian government-in-exile. As a result of repatriation of Poles to Poland, their number in Georgia decreased from over 15,000 in 1914 to 3,000 in 1926. Many Georgian military officers found refuge in Poland and joined the Polish Army. The officers fought in Polish defense during the joint German-Soviet invasion of Poland which started World War II in 1939. Many then joined the Polish resistance movement and some also fought in the Warsaw Uprising in 1944. Several Georgian officers were also among Poles murdered by the Russians in the large Katyn massacre in 1940. Poles in Georgia were among the victims of the so-called Polish Operation and Kulak Operation, carried out by the Soviet Union during the Great Purge in 1937–1938. Among the victims was painter, graphic artist and illustrator Henryk Hryniewski.

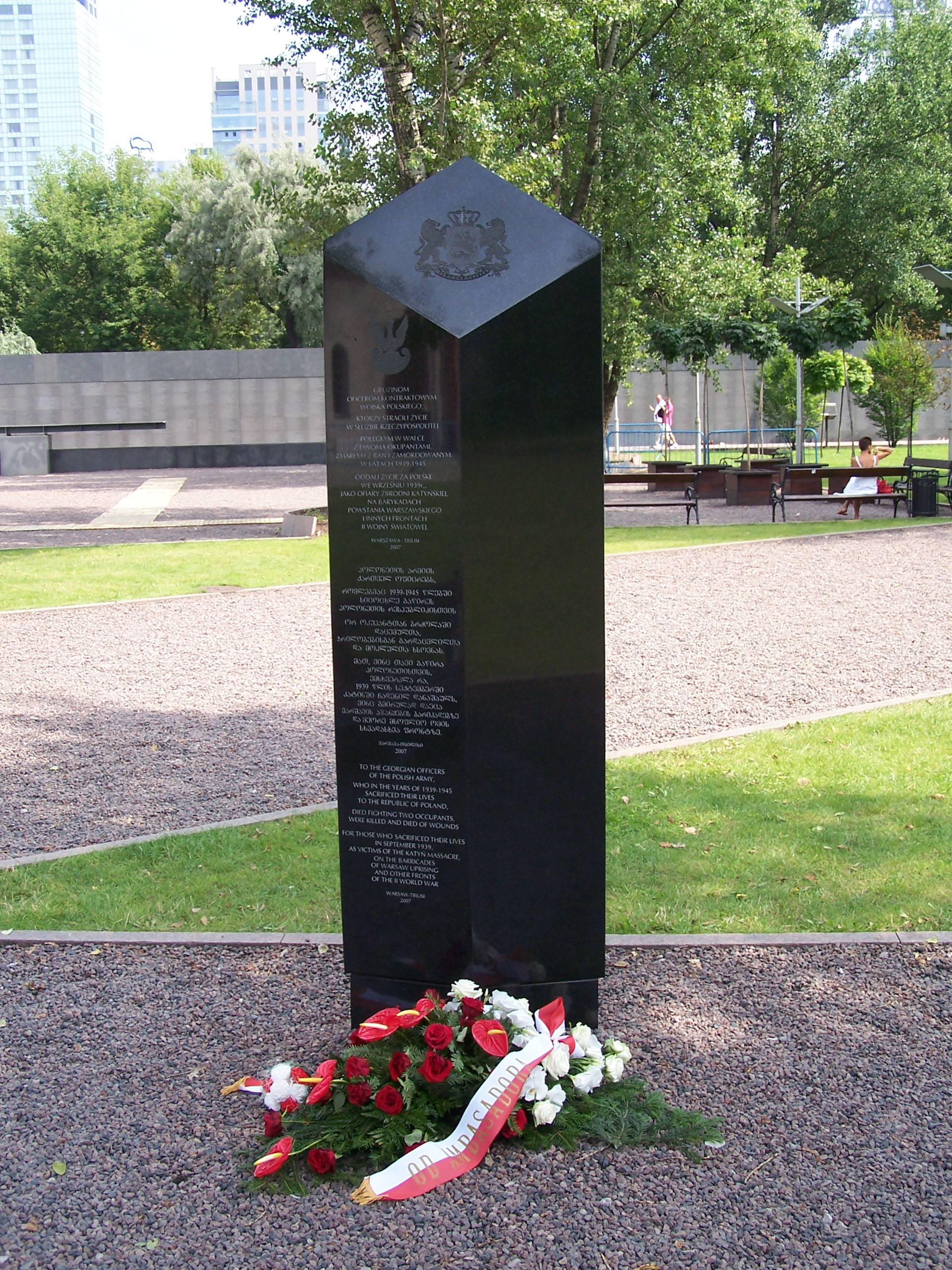
Memorial to the Georgian officers of the Polish Army who sacrificed their lives to Poland, at the Warsaw Uprising Museum.

After Operation Barbarossa in 1941, many Polish refugees from Soviet-occupied eastern Poland ended up in Georgia, where they encountered local Poles as well as friendly Georgians. After the Sikorski–Mayski agreement, the Polish embassy in Moscow was allowed to establish local offices in the Georgian SRR and organize care for the Polish population in Georgia. Many Poles then joined the newly formed Anders' Army. In July 1942 the Soviets liquidated the Polish offices in Georgia and then mostly arrested their officials in order to replace them with newly formed puppet Polish structures, subordinated to the communist authorities. During the war, about 10,000 Polish refugees ended up in Georgia, however their number gradually decreased, as many Poles joined the Anders' Army, then the First Polish Army and also returned to Poland. According to official data, in January 1945 there were still 1,879 registered refugees from Poland in Georgia. After the war, in the years 1946-1948, 3,000 people were repatriated from Georgia to Poland.

== Modern relations ==
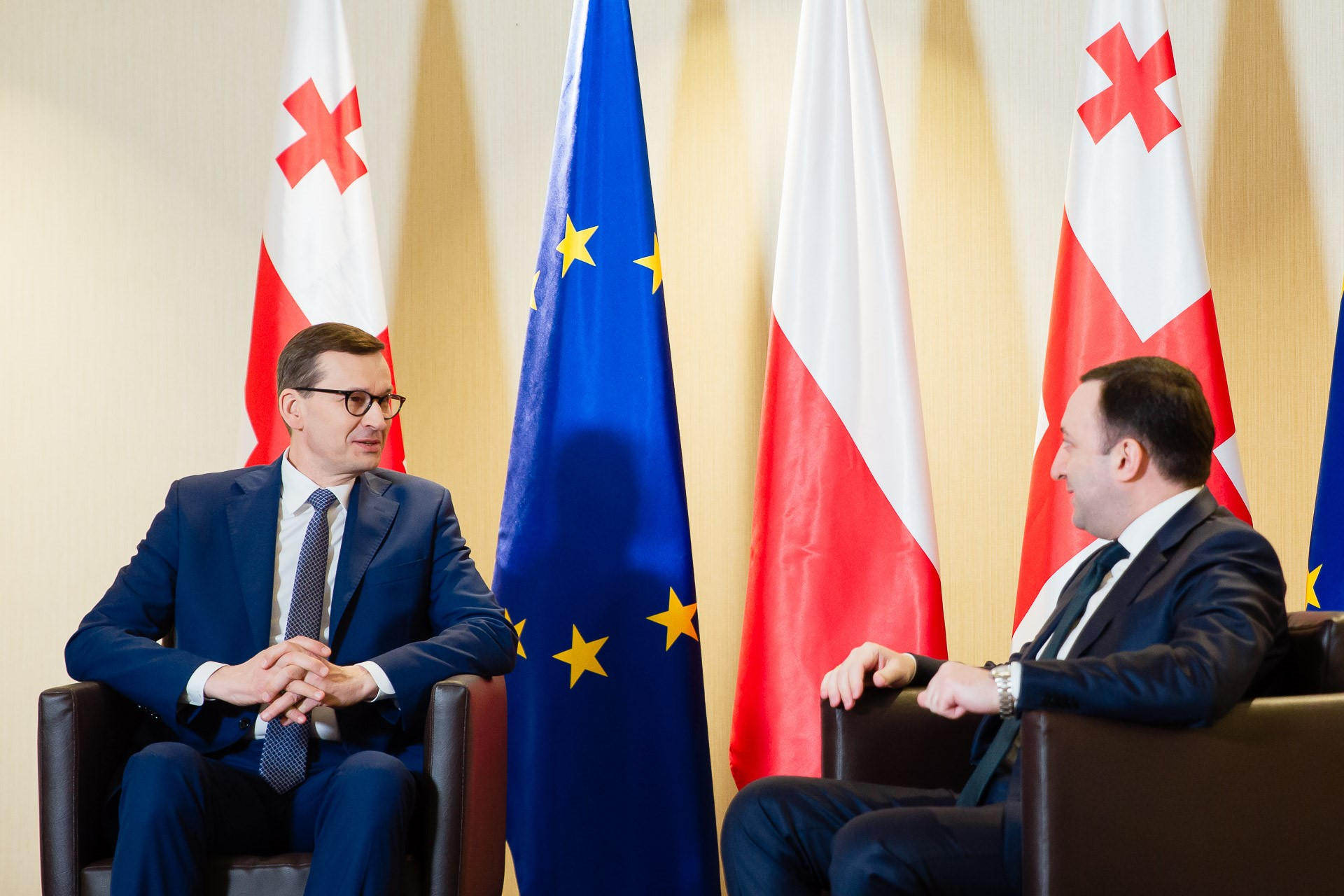
Georgian Prime Minister Irakli Garibashvili during meeting with Polish Prime Minister Mateusz Morawiecki in Batumi in 2022

The diplomatic relation was reestablished on 28 April 1992, following the restoration of independent Georgia in 1991. In 1993 a friendship and cooperation treaty and a cultural and scientific cooperation agreement were signed.

In 2007 in Warsaw presidents Lech Kaczyński and Mikheil Saakashvili unveiled a monument to Georgian officers of the Polish Army who lost their lives in the Katyn massacre, in the Warsaw Uprising and on many fronts of World War II. In 2011 the Museum of Georgian Officers of the Polish Army was opened in the former house of Nikoloz Matikashvili, Georgian Major of the Polish Army, in Piaseczno near Warsaw.

During the Russo-Georgian War in 2008, Poland strongly supported Georgia. The President of Poland, Lech Kaczyński, flew to Tbilisi along with other Central and Eastern European presidents to rally against the Russian military buildup and subsequent military conflict.

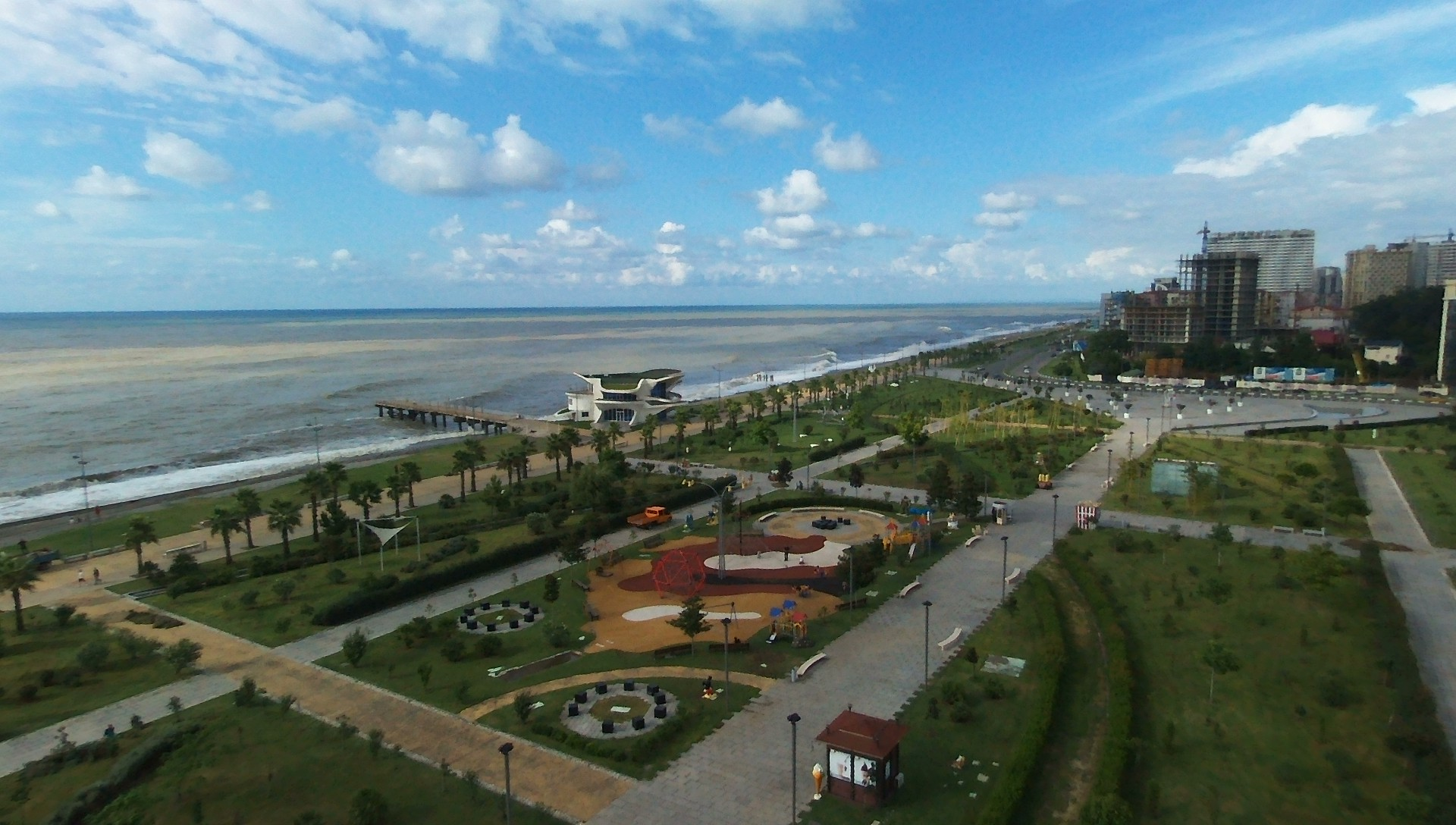
Lech and Maria Kaczynski Boulevard under construction in Batumi, Georgia

After several attacks on the Georgian Ministry of Foreign Affairs website, the Polish president allowed the Georgian MFA to publish its messages on his website.

April 11, 2010, was declared a day of national mourning in Georgia to commemorate the 96 victims of the Smolensk air disaster, including Polish President Lech Kaczyński, with the Georgian president's administration stating that "Georgia lost the greatest friend in the international community, Poland and Europe lost the greatest politician." Georgian President Mikheil Saakashvili attended the state funeral of Lech and Maria Kaczyński in Kraków despite the air travel disruption after the 2010 Eyjafjallajökull eruption.

In 2004–2018, Poland spent over 140 million PLN for implementation of more than 300 projects in Georgia as part of a development assistance programme. Since the introduction of visa-free travel in 2017, there has been an increase in emigration from Georgia to Poland, mainly for work. In 2018, a Polish-Georgian Parliamentary Assembly and a Polish Institute in Georgia were established. On May 20, 2018, a celebration of the 100th anniversary of Georgia's independence was held in Warsaw, including at the Tomb of the Unknown Soldier, where the most important ceremonies on Polish national days are held. In November 2021, Poland donated 468,000 COVID-19 vaccines to Georgia. In 2021 the number of Georgian citizens with valid residence permits in Poland exceeded 10,000.

At the 2021 Georgian Independence Day celebration in Tbilisi, Polish President Andrzej Duda declared Poland's support for Georgia's candidacy for NATO and the EU, stating that there are few countries and nations as close to each other as ours.

In response to the 2024–2025 Georgian political crisis, Poland banned eight Georgian officials in April 2025 from entering the country due to their alleged role in violence against anti-government protesters.

== Resident diplomatic missions ==
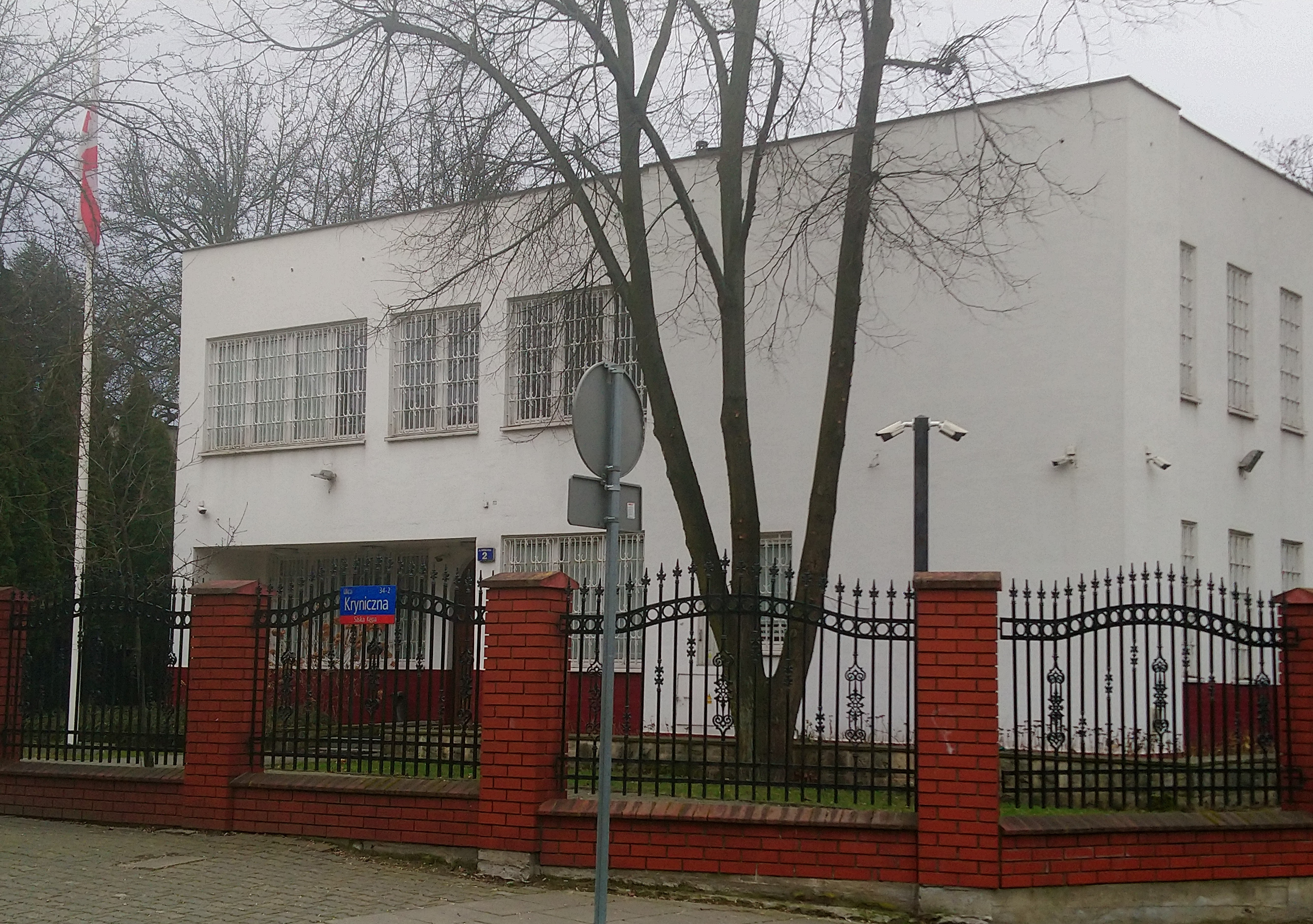
Embassy of Georgia in Warsaw

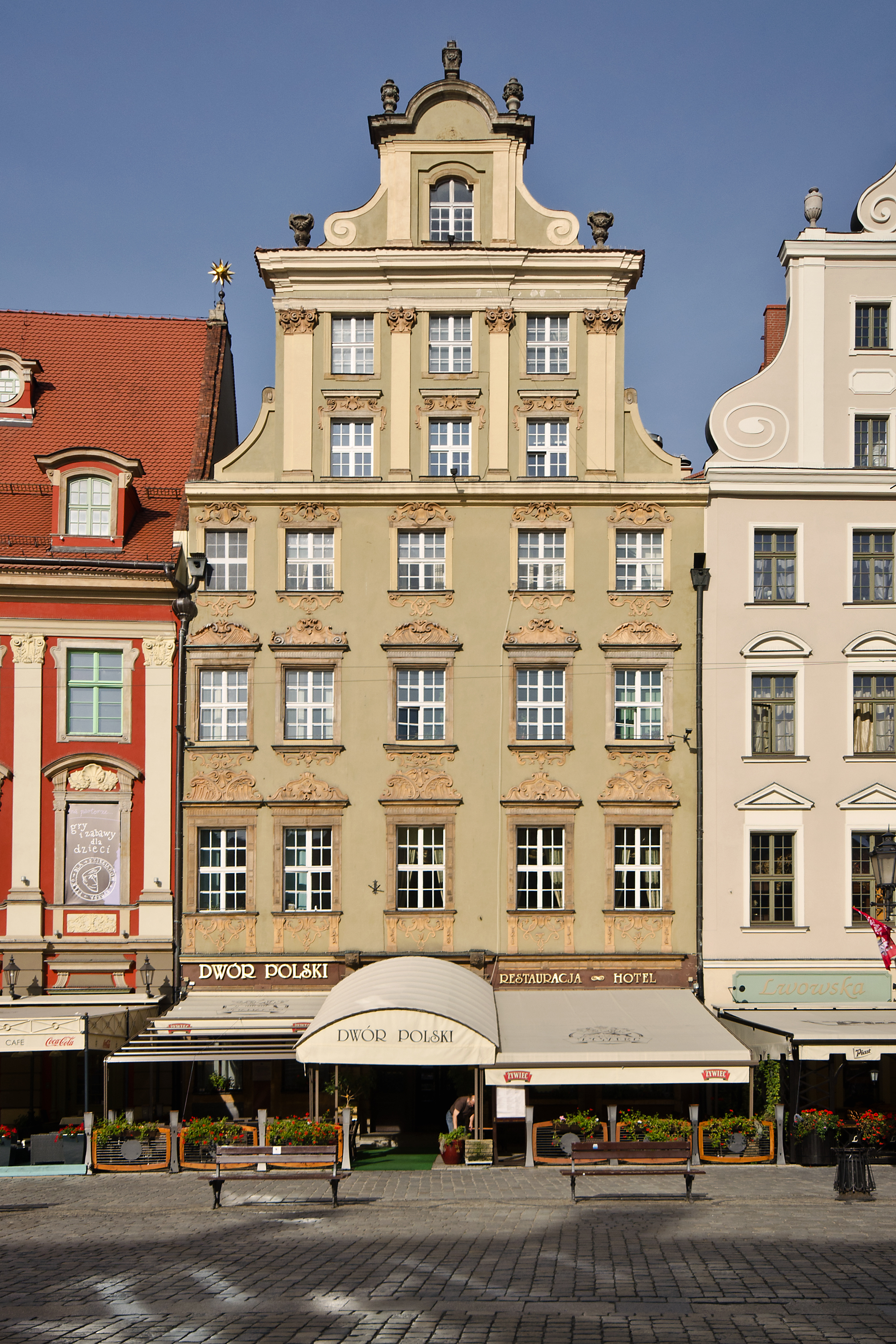
Honorary Consulate of Georgia in Wrocław

- Georgia has an embassy in Warsaw.
- Poland has an embassy in Tbilisi.

== See also ==
- Foreign relations of Georgia
- Foreign relations of Poland
- Georgia-NATO relations
- Georgia-EU relations
  - Accession of Georgia to the EU
- Georgians in Poland
- Poles in Georgia
- Armenia–Poland relations
- Azerbaijan–Poland relations

== Bibliography ==
- Głowacki, Albin (1992). "O uchodźcach polskich w Gruzji w latach II wojny światowej". In Kolbaja, Dawid (ed.). Pro Georgia II (in Polish). Warszawa: Towarzystwo Gruzińsko-Polskie. ISBN 83-900527-1-7.
