= Georgians in Poland =

- Members of the Georgian Community in Warsaw, 1930

Total population
- 1077 including second-identity responses (2021, census)

Regions with significant populations
- Warsaw

Languages
- Georgian, Polish

Religion
- Georgian Orthodox Church, Roman Catholicism

Georgians in Poland (Georgian: ქართველები პოლონეთში, romanized: kartvelebi p'olonetshi) form a small population, although their presence is attested since the early modern period.

== History ==
The documented ties between Georgia and Poland reach back to the 15th century, when the Georgian (Kartlian) Constantine I sent a diplomatic mission to the Polish King Alexander Jagiellon. Later, Polish King Jan III Sobieski tried to establish contacts with Georgia. Many Georgians participated in military campaigns led by Poland in the 17th century. Bogdan Gurdziecki, a Georgian, who was the greatest authority on all things Persian working in the Polish king's diplomatic service, made frequent diplomatic trips to Persia, on which he obtained, among other things, guarantees upholding earlier privileges for missionaries. Already during the rule of King Jan Kazimierz, he sent on missions to Isfahan, and King Jan III Sobieski availed himself of Gurdziecki's talents in like manner (in 1668, 1671, 1676–1678, in 1682–1684, and in 1687). Gurdziecki remained at the court of the shah for several years in the capacity of special resident and representative of the Polish king; it was he who delivered to the shah Suleiman news about the victory of the Christian forces at Vienna (1683).

In the late 18th century, Poland lost its independence in the course of the Partitions of Poland, and its territory was annexed by Prussia (later Germany), Russia and Austria, while Georgia was annexed by Russia in the 19th century. In 1832, the Russians discovered a Georgian independence conspiracy and then deported some of its participants to the Russian Partition of Poland, including Giorgi Eristavi, Georgian poet and playwright, who learned Polish during his exile and later translated poems of the Polish national poet Adam Mickiewicz into Georgian. In 1863, Petre Nakashidze, future Georgian lecturer and activist, was an eyewitness of the Polish January Uprising in the Russian Partition of Poland. His accounts began to be published by the Georgian press, but after the first part was published, the Russian censorship intervened and stopped the publication of the subsequent parts. The commander of the Dęblin and Warsaw fortresses was Ivane Kazbegi, who later settled in restored independent Poland in the interbellum and joined the Polish Army. Young Georgians came to study in Warsaw, where they sought inspiration and examples for their national liberation activity. In Warsaw, Georgian students founded the League for the Liberation of Georgia, which was discovered by Russians and its members were arrested, including future writer Shio Aragvispireli. Future leader of independent Georgia and then the Georgian government-in-exile Noe Zhordania studied at the Veterinary Institute in Warsaw.

Several Georgian politicians, intellectuals and military officers left Georgia for Poland after the Soviet armies invaded the Democratic Republic of Georgia (DRG) in February 1921, taking over the government and establishing the Georgian Soviet Socialist Republic in the same March. Although not very numerous and consisting of a few hundred members, the Georgian community of Poland was very active politically and culturally. The best remembered are, however, the Georgian military personnel who served in the Polish ranks from the early 1920s until the end of World War II.

=== Georgian Prometheism ===
Active diplomatic contacts developed between the short-lived DRG and Poland was part of Józef Piłsudski's well-known political concept known as Prometheism. Its aim was to greatly reduce the power of the Russian Empire and subsequently, the Soviet Union, by supporting nationalist independence movements of the major non-Russian peoples that lived within the borders of Russia or the Soviet Union.

The Georgian Promethean groups were one of the most active within the movement. This was not overlooked by the Bolsheviks, who in 1930 organized the assassination of Noe Ramishvili, a prominent Georgian political leader and a major promoter of Prometheism.

The 1932 Polish-Soviet mutual nonaggression pact precipitated the downfall of the Promethean movement though the Georgians continued their activities in various cultural and social organizations. The most important was the Committee of Georgia founded as early as 1921 by several Georgian intellectuals led by Sergo Qurulashvili. They had close contacts with the centers of Georgian political emigration across Europe, primarily in Paris. The Committee organized various meetings and social activities and provided material support for the Georgian émigrés. It also published its own publications, ProGeorgia (1922), and Propartia (1923). From 1923 to 1924, Qurulashvili also directed the journal Schlos Wschodu pertaining to the Georgian problems. The Georgians organized also the Union of Georgian Students and the Polish-Georgian Society led by Prince Pavle Tumanishvili. The activities of these organizations were limited, however, due to financial difficulties.

=== Georgians in the Polish military service ===
Podpolkovnik Giorgi Turashvili, 1931

Immediately after the fall of the DRG, Noe Zhordania, the head of the Georgian government-in-exile, addressed the friendly nations, particularly France, Greece and Poland, to help in maintaining the professional military cadres. The government of Poland promptly responded, and from 1922 to 1924, hundreds of Georgian Junkers and officers, recommended by Zhordania’s government, were accepted in the Polish military schools. Several professional officers of the former DRG attended military training courses at the Polish army centers. Although not obligated to do so, virtually all of them were subsequently enrolled in the Polish army as contract officers. In the subsequent decade, the total number of Georgian military servicemen reached 1,000.

At the outbreak of World War II, most of the Georgian officers took part in the 1939 Defensive War, and several of them commanded their own regiments composed of Polish soldiers. The most notable officers were:

Zakaria Bakradze, generał dywizji, deputy commander of Polish 15th Infantry Division. Aleksandre Chkheidze, generał brygady, deputy commander of Polish 16th Infantry Division. Ivane Kazbegi, generał brygady. Aleksandre Koniashvili, generał brygady. Kirile Kutateladze, generał brygady. Aleksandre Zakariadze, generał brygady. Viktor Lomidze, the commander of ORP Gryf. Jerzy Tumaniszwili, captain of the navy, who was awarded Virtuti Militari. Valerian Tevzadze, podpułkownik, the commander of the northern sector of the Polish defences during the siege of Warsaw. Mikheil Kvaliashvili, major, the commander of a cavalry battalion within the 15th Uhlans Regiment.

Several Georgian officers were captured by the Soviet forces during the 1939 campaign. General Chkheidze, Major Mamaladze, Captain Skhirtladze and Captain Rusiashvili were killed from 1940 to 1941. Many others spent several years in the gulag camps.

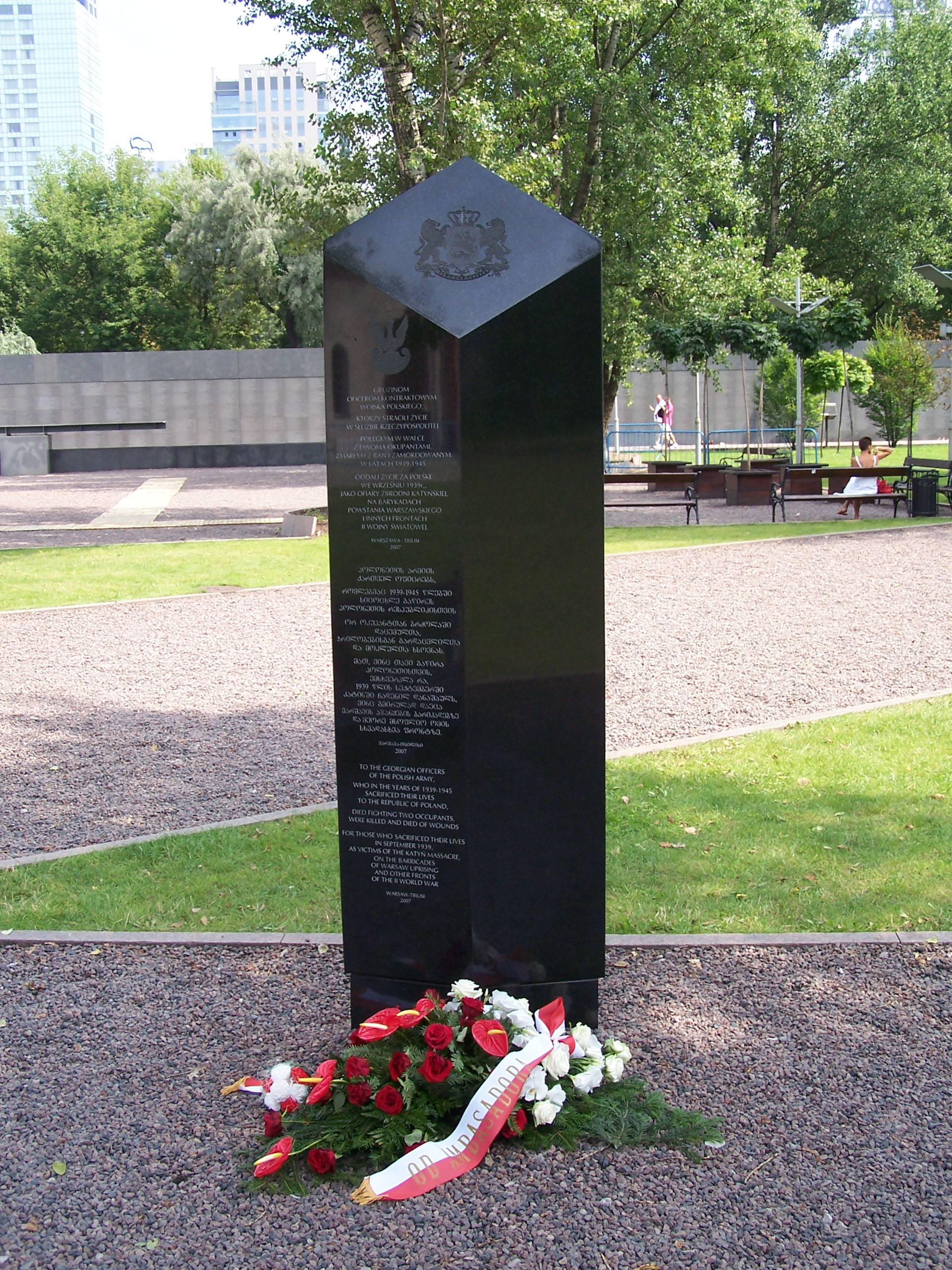
Memorial to the Georgian officers of the Polish Army who sacrificed their lives to Poland, at the Warsaw Uprising Museum

During the occupation of Poland, the Germans reorganized the Warsaw-based Committee of Georgia and placed it under their tight control. The occupation administration encouraged the Georgian soldiers in the Polish service to join the Georgian Legion of the Wehrmacht. Some of them responded to the Nazi request, but subsequently joined the Polish resistance movement.

The Georgian Orthodox priest and Professor Grigol Peradze of Warsaw University was killed on December 6, 1942 in the Nazi concentration camp of Auschwitz (Oświęcim) when he took the blame for the murder of a German officer to spare his fellow prisoners, or, according to another report, when he entered a gas-chamber in the place of a Jewish prisoner who had a large family.

The American John Malchase David Shalikashvili, general of the United States Army who served as Chairman of the Joint Chiefs of Staff from 1993 to 1997, was born in Warsaw, Poland, where his father Dimitri Shalikashvili also served in the army.

After the war, most Georgians either left for Western Europe or were deported to the Soviet camps though some of them (e.g., General Valerian Tevzadze) remained in the Polish anti-Communist underground for several decades.

== Modern diaspora ==
536 people declared Georgian nationality in the 2011 Polish census, of which 470 lived in cities and towns, and only 66 in rural areas. Since the introduction of visa-free travel in 2017, there has been an increase in emigration from Georgia to Poland, mainly for work. In 2021 the number of Georgian citizens with valid residence permits in Poland exceeded 10,000.

== Notable people ==
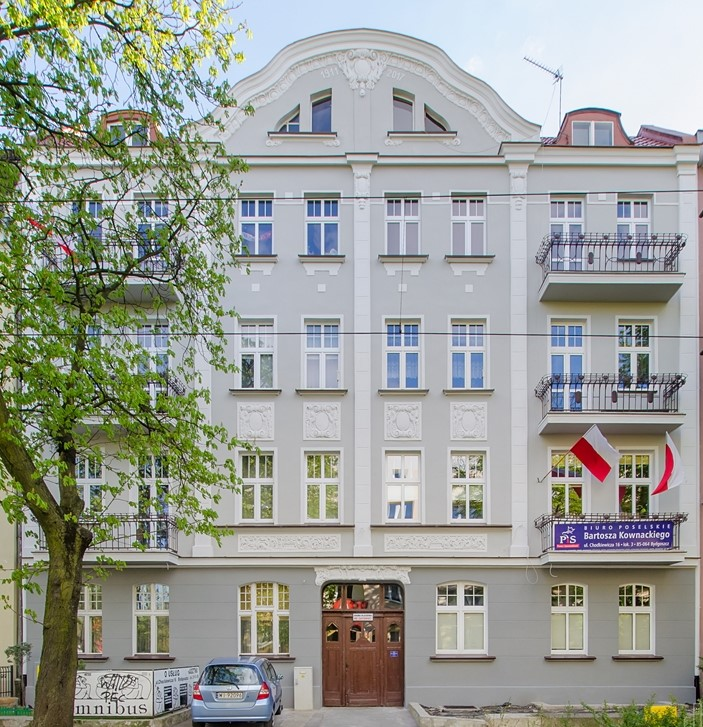
House of Zakaria Bakradze in Bydgoszcz

- Bogdan Gurdziecki (died 1700), Georgian-born Polish diplomat
- Giorgi Eristavi (1813–1864), playwright, poet, journalist, translator
- Ivane Kazbegi (1860–1943), military officer
- Shio Aragvispireli (1867–1926), writer
- Noe Zhordania (1868–1953), Georgian politician; studied in Warsaw
- Zakaria Bakradze (1868–1938), military officer
- Alexandre Chkheidze (1878–1940), military officer, victim of the Soviet Union
- Valerian Tevzadze (1894–1985), military officer, member of the Polish resistance movement in World War II
- Grigol Peradze (1899–1942), ecclesiastic figure, philologist, theologian, historian, victim of Nazi Germany
- Viktor Lomidze (1900–1956), military officer
- Jerzy Tumaniszwili (1916–2010), naval commander

== See also ==
- Georgia–Poland relations
- Georgian diaspora
- Immigration to Poland
- Poles in Georgia

== Bibliography ==
- Woźniak, Andrzej (1992). "Gruzini w XIX-wiecznej Warszawie". In Kolbaja, Dawid (ed.). Pro Georgia II (in Polish). Warszawa: Towarzystwo Gruzińsko-Polskie. ISBN 83-900527-1-7.
