= Giorgi Kazbegi =

Imperial Russian Army general (1840–1921)

Prince Giorgi Kazbegi Георгий Казбек
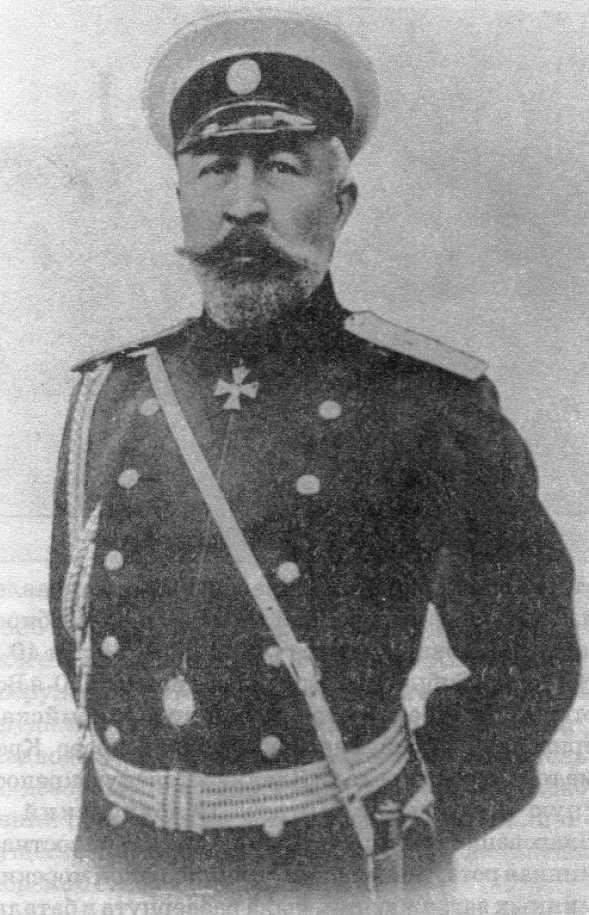
- Kazbek in 1905
- Born: 3 November 1840; Stepan-Tsminda, Georgia, Russian Empire
- Died: 14 April 1921 (aged 80); Constantinople
- Military career
- Allegiance: Russian Empire
- Branch: Imperial Russian army
- Rank: General of the infantry
- Unit: 14th Georgian Grenadier Regiment
- Commands: Kommandant of the Ivangorod Fortress; Kommandant of the Warsaw Fortress; Kommandant of the Vladivostok Fortress; Quartermaster general of the Warsaw Military District; Deputy chief of staff of the Far East
- Conflicts: Russo-Turkish War; Russian Revolution of 1905
- Awards: Gold Sword for Bravery
- Other work: Head of Society for the Spreading of Literacy among Georgians

Giorgi Kazbegi (Georgian: გიორგი ყაზბეგი; Russian: Георгий Николаевич Казбек, Georgy Nikolayevich Kazbek) (November 3, 1840 – April 14, 1921) was a Georgian nobleman and general in the Imperial Russian service. His military and civil career spanned more than four decades, ending with the Bolshevik takeover of Georgia in 1921. He is also an author of military and historical reports, including an account of his 1874 reconnaissance mission to the then-Ottoman held Georgian lands with sketches of the region's medieval Christian monuments.

== Family ==
Kazbegi was born into the Kazbegi family to a Russian army officer in the village of Stepan-Tsminda in the mountainous Georgian province of Khevi, then part of the Tiflis Governorate, Russian Empire. He had two brothers, Dimitri and Gabriel, and a sister, Elisabed. Gabriel was a Russian army colonel, while Dimitri and Elisabed organized a local school in Khevi. Their first cousin, Alexander Kazbegi, was a Georgian prose writer.

Kazbegi was married to Elisabed (died 1919), daughter of Prince Alexander Maghalashvili. They had four children: Elene, Niko, Constantine and Alexander. He outlived his wife and all three of his sons. Alexander, a Russian army colonel during World War I, was killed at Łódź in 1914. Constantine, a military engineer, was murdered in St. Petersburg in 1915. Niko, a Russian cavalry rittmaster, died in the Carpathian Mountains in 1917.

== Early career ==
Giorgi Kazbegi graduated from the General Staff Academy St.Petersburg in 1870 and was dispatched, in the rank of major, to the Caucasian Grenadiers Division. During his service in the Caucasus, he befriended the leading Georgian intellectuals of that time. In 1873 he accompanied the popular Georgian poet Akaki Tsereteli in his journey to the mountainous western Georgian provinces of Racha and Lechkhumi. In the meantime, he progressed through military ranks, becoming lieutenant-colonel in 1874.

== Turkish war ==
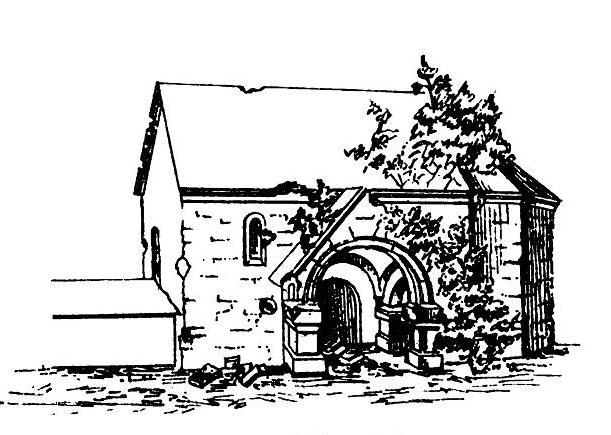
The Skhalta cathedral. A drawing from Dimitri Bakradze's book (1878) is copied from Kazbegi's travelogue of "Turkish Georgia".

In 1874, Kazbegi spent three months on a reconnaissance mission to the historical southwestern Georgian districts around Batum, which were under the sway of the Ottoman Empire at that time. He left a valuable account of his travels to these hitherto little explored lands, accompanied by sketches of medieval Georgian churches and monasteries. During the Russo-Turkish War (1877–1878), Kazbegi served in the special Kobuleti detachment, receiving a concussion at the action of Achkvistavi. For his conduct, Kazbegi was promoted to colonel. He was then, successively, in command of the 153rd Derbent Infantry Regiment (1878–1879) and the 79th Kurin Infantry Regiment (1879–1882). Retired to reserves in 1882, he spent the next three years traveling in Europe and America. In 1885 he returned to active service, being attached to the Caucasian staff. He was appointed Chief of Staff of the Warsaw Fortress and promoted to major-general on October 29, 1892.

== Later career ==
Kazbegi then served as a Quartermaster general of the Warsaw Military District from March 27, 1897, to July 3, 1899, and a commandant of the Ivangorod Fortress from July 3, 1899, to June 23, 1902. He was promoted to lieutenant-general on January 1, 1901, and served as a commandant of Warsaw Fortress from June 23, 1902, until January 25, 1905, when he was placed in charge of the Vladivostok Fortress. He served in this capacity during the Russian Revolution of 1905. Kazbegi responded to a revolutionary upheaval in Vladivostok with a combination of diplomacy and force. He did not immediately disperse the demonstrating crowds, persuaded rebellious garrison troops to return to their barracks and then called in Ussuri Cossack detachments to restore order. On March 7, 1906, he was dismissed from the active military service for his lenient treatment of the mutineers. The American socialist activist William English Walling reports an incident in which General Kazbegi was confronted by the Russian tsar Nicholas II:

To General Kazbek, reporting a similarly bloodless success against the revolutionists, the Czar listened without a word. After having given his report, the general was leaving and was already near the door when he heard a low, harsh voice behind him. He turned immediately round; the Czar was following him with a wolfish stride, and hissing through his closed teeth: "You ought to have fired just the same, general! You ought to have fired just the same!"

== Last years ==
Remaining at disposal of Commander-in-Chief of the Far East, Kazbegi was attached to the Russian Chief of Staff until September 25, 1907, when he received the rank of general of infantry and was allowed to retire with a pension and a privilege of wearing a uniform. Kazbegi then returned to his native Georgia, where he was elected, from 1908 to 1918, a chairman of the Society for the Spreading of Literacy Among Georgians, a leading Georgian cultural institution of that time. During the years of Georgia's short-lived independence from 1918 to 1921, Kazbegi was an Honorary President of that Society. The Soviet Russian invasion in 1921 forced the seasoned general into exile to Constantinople, where he died in obscurity the same year.

== Awards ==
Among the awards Kazbegi received during his 47 years of military service were: a Gold Sword for Bravery (1877) and Order of St. Anna, 3rd Class (1877) and 1st Class (1899), Order of Saint Stanislaus, 3rd Class (1897) and 1st Class (1895). He was also awarded an Order of the Crown of Romania in 1899.

== Works ==
- Военная история Грузинского гренадерского Е.И.В. Великого Князя Константина Николаевича полка, в связи с историей Кавказской войны. — Тифлис, 1865.
- Куринцы в Чечне и Дагестане. 1834-1861 г. Очерк истории 79 пехотного Куринского Его Императорского Высочества Великого Князя Павла Александровича полка. — Тифлис, 1885.
- Военно-статистическое описание Терской области. Ч. 1–2. — Тифлис, 1888.
- Военно-статистический и стратегический очерки Лазистанского Санджака. — Тифлис, 1902.
- Служба войск при атаке и обороне крепостей. — Варшава, 1900 (2-е изд., 1902).

== Bibliography ==
- (in Russian) Волков С. В. Генералитет Российской империи. Энциклопедический словарь генералов и адмиралов от Петра I до Николая II. Том I. А — К. — М., 2009. — С. 5997. — ISBN 978-5-9524-4166-8
- (in Russian) Список генералам по старшинству. Составлен по 1 мая 1893 года. — СПб., 1893. — С. 873. То же. Составлен по 4 июля 1907 года. — СПб., 1907. — С. 130.
- (in Russian) Глиноецкий Н. П. Исторический очерк Николаевской академии Генерального штаба. — СПб., 1882. — Прил., с. 158.
- (in Russian) Старчевский А. А. Памятник Восточной войны 1877 — 1878 гг. — СПб., 1878. — С. 140.
