= Jerzy Tumaniszwili =

Polish naval commander

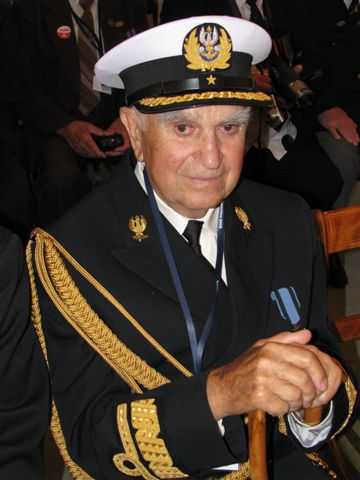
Jerzy Tumaniszwili in 2009

Jerzy Tumaniszwili (Georgian: გიორგი თუმანიშვილი, Giorgi Tumanishvili) (June 21, 1916 – December 9, 2010) was a Polish naval commander of a Georgian aristocratic descent. A World War II veteran and later an émigré to the United States, he received the rank of rear-admiral from the government of Poland in 2008.

Jerzy Tumaniszwili was born in Moscow in 1916. His father Prince Paul Toumanoff (Tumanishvili, 1872–1935) served as Marshal of Nobility of Georgia in the last years of the Russian Empire. His mother, Jadwiga Szyszko, was a daughter of the Polish general Cezary Szyszko, a commander in Zhytomyr. After the Russian Revolution of 1917, the family moved to Georgia, which they fled, following the country's takeover by the Bolsheviks in 1921. The family eventually settled in Warsaw, where Paul Toumanoff headed a local Georgian émigré committee from 1924 to 1930.

In 1935, Jerzy Tumaniszwili, through the recommendation of General Alexander Zakariadze, a Georgian in the Polish service, was enrolled in the Polish Naval Academy. In 1938 Tumaniszwili received the rank of second lieutenant of the Polish navy. During World War II, he served as an artillery officer on the ORP Burza, OF Ouragan, ORP Krakowiak, and ORP Piorun. He participated in various combat missions, including the Norwegian Campaign, the Battle at Calais, the Atlantic Convoys, the actions in the Bay of Biscay, and the D-Day operations. He was wounded in combat in 1942 during battle with enemy torpedo boats. In 1944, Tumaniszwili was promoted to captain of the Polish navy.

In 1950, Tumaniszwili left Communist Poland for the United States, where he ran an enterprise, producing disposable needles. He also wrote for the local Polish press and participated in the émigré Polish organizations, including the New York City-based Józef Piłsudski Institute of America. In 1990, the president of Poland in exile, Ryszard Kaczorowski, gave him a promotion to lieutenant commander. In 2008 he received the honorary rank of rear admiral from President Lech Kaczyński. He was decorated with Virtuti Militari, Polonia Restituta and other orders. Tumaniszwili died at age 93 in Florida in 2010.
