= Kazbegi family =

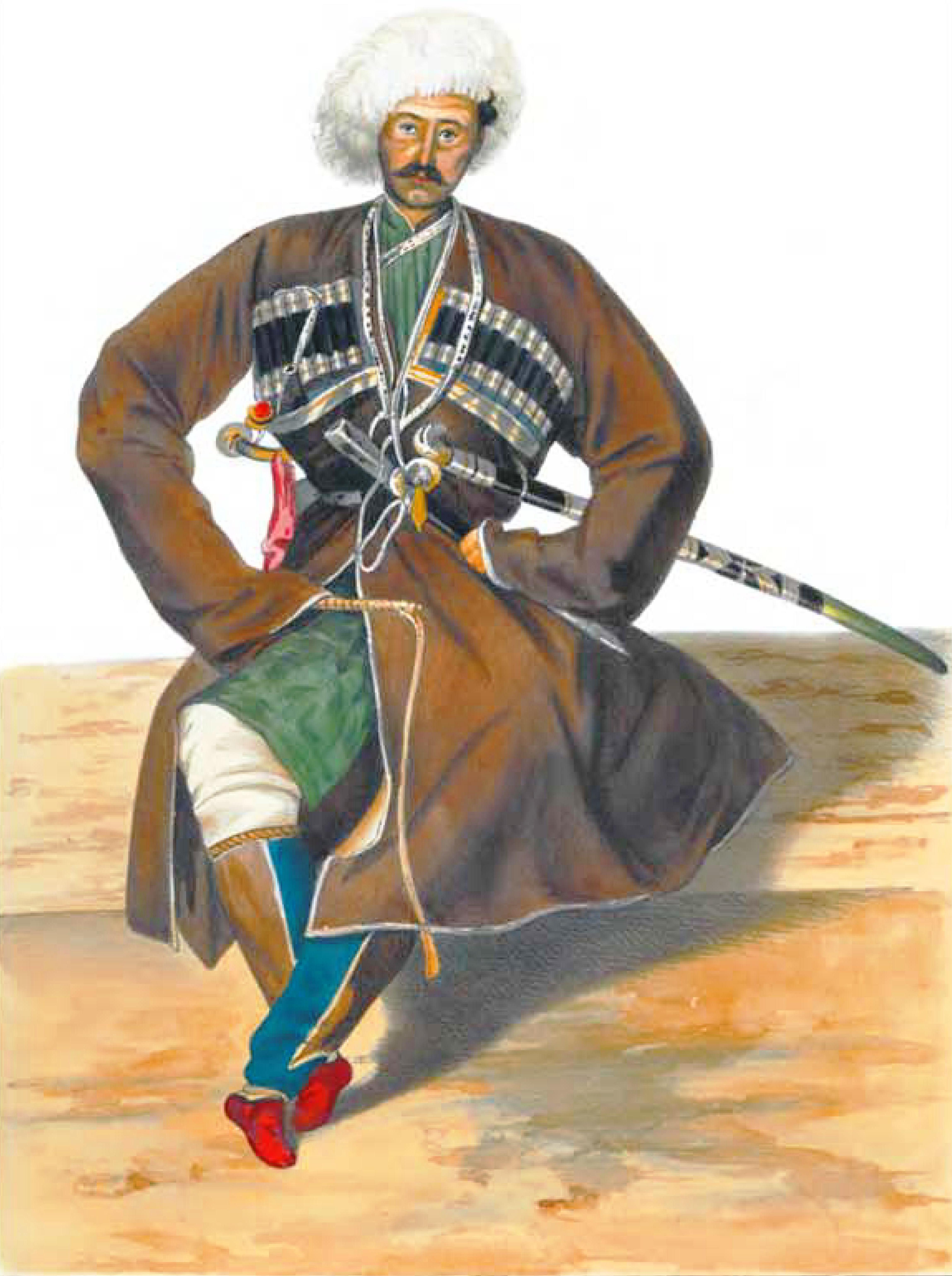
Prince Kazbek, by Grigory Gagarin, 1840

The Kazbegi family (Georgian: ყაზბეგი), originally known as Chopikashvili (ჩოფიკაშვილი), was an influential clan from the northeastern highland Georgian district of Khevi. Of a semi-legendary noble descent, the Chopikashvili rose in prominence under the Georgian king Erekle II at the end of the 18th century, when the clan's leader Kazi-Beg was made an official (mouravi) in the village Stepantsminda and placed in charge of collecting tolls on travelers through the key road to the North Caucasus.

Kazi-Beg's son Gabriel was made an aznauri, noble of a lower rank, and adopted the surname Kazbegi (Kazbek). He played a role in the Russian-Georgian interaction and pledged his loyalty to the Russians upon their annexation of Georgia in 1801. When the Georgian princes of the deposed Bagrationi dynasty rallied Georgian and Ossetian highlanders against the Tsar's rule in 1804, Gabriel Kazbegi fought in the Russian ranks and was promoted to major. The clan ran Stepan-Tsminda – henceforth frequently referred to as Kazbek in Russian accounts – and Khevi as their fief. Gabriel's son Mikheil (1805–1876) fought in the Caucasian War and was made a major general of the Russian army in 1859. Mikheil's son was the famed Georgian prose writer Alexander Kazbegi.

== Population ==
- Chopikashvili - 2050 people

== Notable members ==
- Alexander Kazbegi, writer
- Giorgi Kazbegi, general and military writer
- Ivane Kazbegi, general
- Mikheil Kazbegi, general
