= Jerzy Ilicz =

Polish ambassador

Jerzy Ilicz was the Polish ambassador to Safavid Iran during the reign of king Władysław IV Vasa (r. 1632—1648). He was accompanied by the Dominican Father Antonio da Fiandra, who was given a letter addressed to the then incumbent Safavid king Abbas II (r. 1642—1666). Da Fiandra had received the letter from the Venetian diplomat Giovanni Tiepolo, on behalf of the Venetian Senate.

The French Jesuit François Rigordi (1609–79), who was sent by the main branch of the Jesuits in the Near East based in Aleppo to the Safavid Empire, arrived in early 1646, shortly before Jerzy Ilicz' arrival, and presented the latter's' recommendation to the court.

== See also ==
- Safavid-Venetian relations

== Sources ==
- Floor, Willem; Herzig, Edmund (2015). Iran and the World in the Safavid Age. I.B.Tauris. p. 151. ISBN 978-1780769905.
- Matthee, Rudi (2008). "JESUITS IN SAFAVID PERSIA". Encyclopaedia Iranica, Vol. XIV, Fas. 6. pp. 634–638.
