= Dimitri Bakradze =

Georgian scholar (1826–1890)

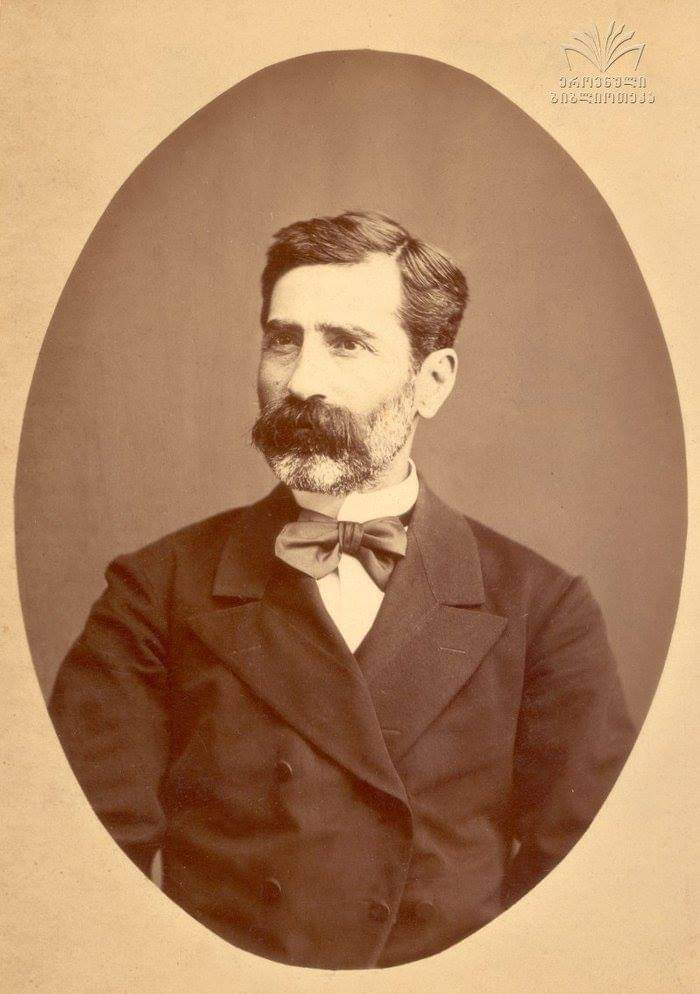

Dimitri Bakradze (Georgian: დიმიტრი ბაქრაძე; 26 October 1826 – 10 February 1890) was a Georgian scholar who authored several influential works in the history, archaeology and ethnography of Georgia and the Caucasus.

He was born in the village Khashmi in the family of a priest in Kakheti, eastern Georgia, (then under the Imperial Russian rule). In 1851 he graduated from the Moscow Theological Academy.

Educated at the theological academies of Tbilisi and Moscow, Bakradze worked as a teacher at Gori and a governmental clerk at Kutaisi in the 1850s. At the same time, he regularly wrote articles on Georgia's history and ethnography for Georgian and Russian press. In 1861, Bakradze permanently settled in Tbilisi where he energetically engaged in public and scholarly activities. In 1875, he published his resonant work The Caucasus in Ancient Monuments of Christianity (Russian: Кавказ в древних памятниках христианства). In 1878, Bakradze was the first scholar to have travelled and studied Adjara and Tao-Klarjeti, the historical Georgian lands recently recovered from the Ottoman Empire. His accounts of this research appeared in several publications and, in 1879, he was elected a corresponding member of Imperial Academy of Sciences, St. Petersburg.

Among the works of Bakradze, those published in the Georgian language stand out: "History of Georgia" (1889), "Georgia and Georgians" (1854); as well as published in Russian "Caucasus in the ancient monuments of Christianity" (1875), "Archaeological journey through Grugia and Adchara" (1878), "Articles on the history and antiquities of Georgia" (1887).

He helped found the Society for the Spreading of Literacy Among Georgians (1879), Society of Amateurs of Caucasian Archaeology (1873), the Society for Caucasian History and Archaeology (1881; chaired it until 1886) and the Museum of Church Antiquities at the Tbilisi Sioni Cathedral (1889). His last major work, The History of Georgia (Georgian: ისტორია საქართველოსი), appeared in 1889 and was an insightful study into the history of Georgia from the beginnings to the end of the 10th century.

Bakradze died in Tbilisi in 1890 and is buried at the Mtatsminda Pantheon. He has a street named after him in Tbilisi. His son, Zakaria Bakradze, went on to serve as a general in the Georgian and Polish armies.
