= Safavid–Venetian relations =

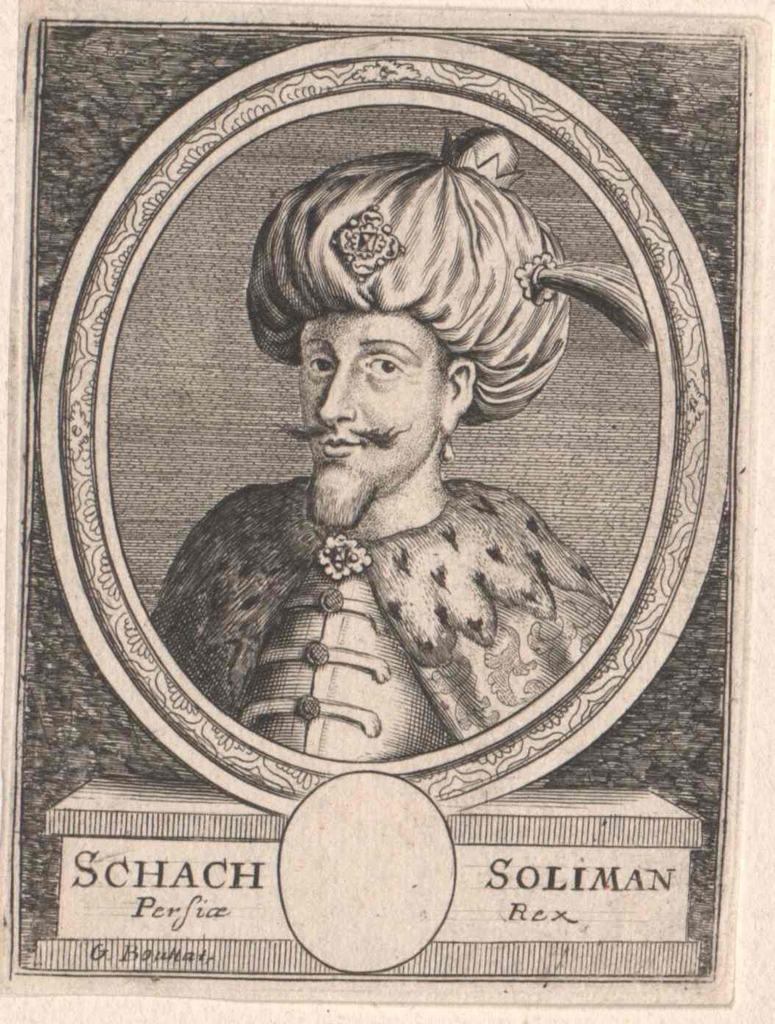
Suleiman I

Safavid–Venetian relations were the relations between Safavid Iran and the Republic of Venice.

== Background ==
The establishment of a strong Safavid state attracted the attention of a number of European states, especially Venice, which regularly waged war with the Ottoman Empire. Shah Ismail I's active foreign policy raised hopes in European diplomatic circles that the Safavid state could become an ally of European states in the military-political conflict with the Ottoman Empire.

The Republic of Venice, which was at war with the Ottoman state, valued the emergence of a new, stronger Safavid state in the place of its traditional ally, the Aq Qoyunlu state, as an historical chance. Since France and Spain started a long war to capture Italy, unable to get the necessary help from the Italian states Venice was forced to wage a war against the Ottoman state (1499-1502) alone. That is why, on the one hand, the Venetian government decided to take advantage of the existing discontent against the Ottomans in the Karaman province, and on the other hand, to learn the possibility of involving the Safavids in the war against the Ottomans.

== History ==
=== 16th century ===
Diplomatic relations between these two states had been formed since the foundation of the Safavid State. At the root of these mutual relations were the relations established during the Aq Qoyunlu state. The Republic of Venice hoped to gain the support of a state with a strong land force through bilateral relations, and the Safavids wanted to obtain firearms from Venice. Also, in frequent wars with the Ottomans, Venice could create a dangerous situation on the coast of the Anatolian peninsula in favor of the Safavids.

Attempts to establish an anti-Ottoman alliance were the main topic of discussion in Safavid–Venetian relations until the end of the 17th century. But there were other issues in this matter. Over time, the Safavid-Venetian trade grew (the main trade items were glass, silk and other expensive items). According to historical sources, both states often asked the other to protect their merchants. In addition, from the middle of the 17th century, the Venetian senate wrote letters of recommendation to the Safavid Empire on behalf of Catholic Armenians and other missionaries.

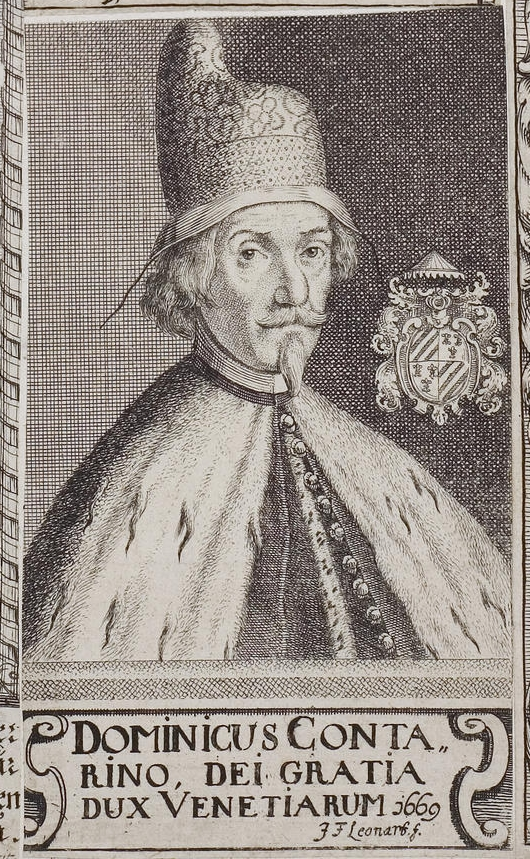
Doge Domenico II Contarini

Marin Sanudo mentioned name of Shah Ismail I in his diary as early as 1501. In 1502, Venice assigned the task of gathering information about the country's new ruler to the Greek Costantino Laskaris from Istanbul. Having lived in Istanbul and Cyprus for many years, Constantino, who was well acquainted with the Eastern world, was sent to Karaman and to the military camp of the Safavids. After he returned from a trip to Karaman and the Safavid military camp, he gave an extensive report of his visit to the Venetian government. Thus, Venice was the first diplomatic contact of the Safavid state with Western Europe.

Laskaris was unable to meet Shah Ismail, but he met their allies, the Karamanids, and convinced Venice of its willingness to support him in his fight against the common enemy, the Ottomans. In 1502, the end of the Ottoman-Venetian war and the ratification of the signed peace treaty by both states eliminated Venice's interest in signing a military alliance with the Safavids. Therefore, this first diplomatic contact of the Safavids with the Republic of Venice did not result in both sides launching military operations against the Ottoman Empire at the same time.

The main goal of the Safavid empire was to acquire firearms from the West and also to expand peaceful relations with European states. For this, it was necessary to go to the coast of the Mediterranean Sea. The condition for going to the Mediterranean coast was to capture either the Karaman from the Ottomans or Syria from the Mamluks. According to Ismail Haqqi Uzuncharshili, not only the Ottoman state, but also the Mamluk state was the target of Safavid Shah Ismail's negotiations with Western states.

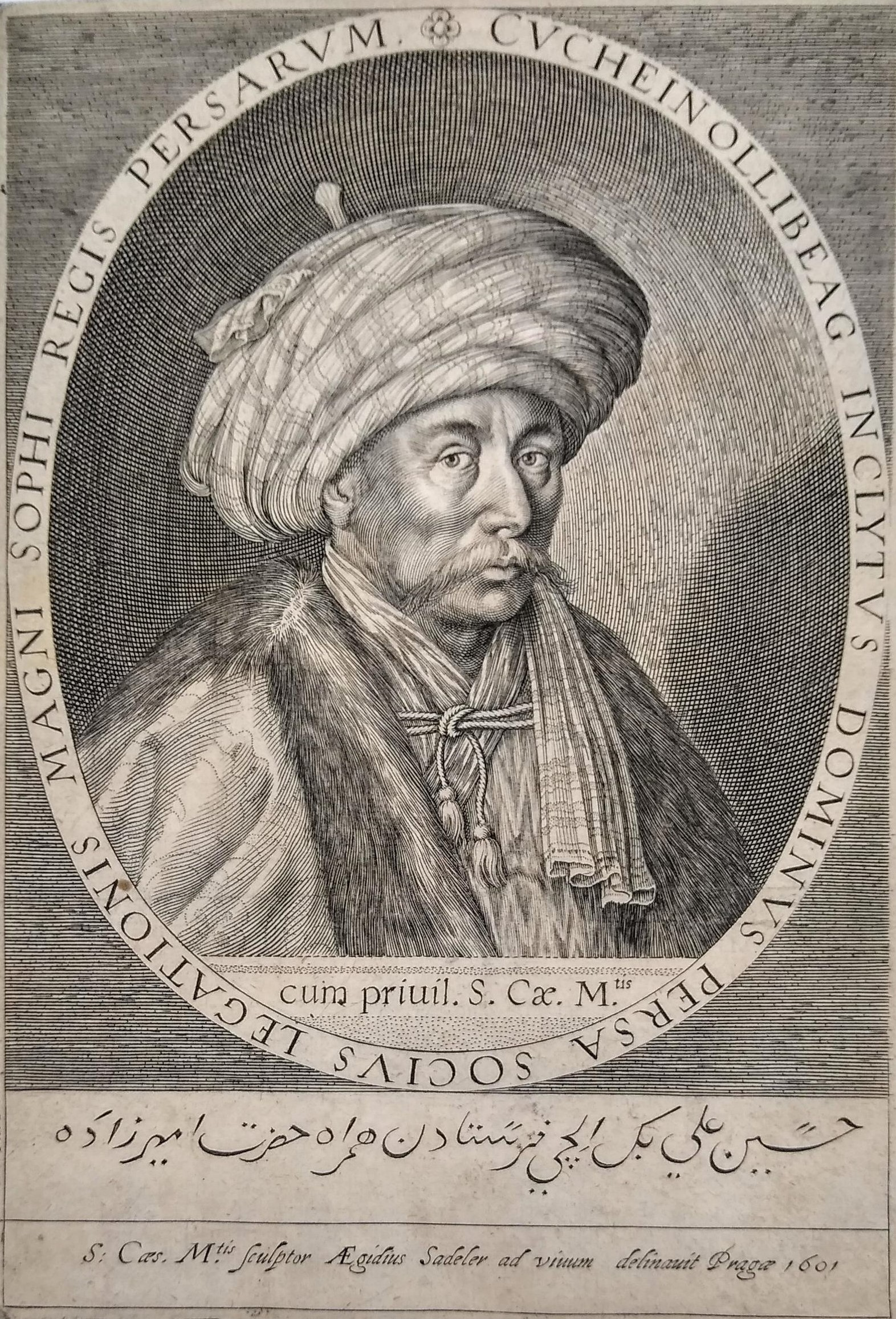
Safavid envoy Hossein Ali Beg Bayat in the Habsburg Palace in Prague.

In 1505, another Karaman envoy who delivered the Shah's letter to the Doge visited the Venetian consul in Damascus and he sent a copy of the letter to Venice. The message was delivered to the city of Venice the following year. 1508, Nafplion, the Venetian governor of the Greek city, was visited by an ambassador of the Safavids dressed as a dervish. The first Safavid ambassadors arrived in Venice in March and May 1509. However, he arrived just a few months before the catastrophic defeat of the Venetians at Agnadello during the Cambrai League war. Consequently, the ambassador received from the republic an expression of attachment and good will to the Shah, but no military support. In 1510, the Mamluks in Syria captured Niccolò Surieri, the ambassador who returned to Venice with a letter from the Safavid Empire. In addition, several representatives were captured in the Levant. All these contacts, as well as others that took place during the reign of Shah Ismail, had one common feature: the desire or hope to create a military alliance against the Ottomans. However, the desire to establish an alliance against the Ottomans, which was the main goal, was not realized. Along with the defeat of Shah Ismayil in the Battle of Chaldiran, Venice's policy against the Ottomans also played an important role in this. Thus, during this period, Venice implemented a policy of appeasement towards the Ottomans and did not want to violate this policy by forming an alliance with its enemy.

The Viceroy of Venice in Cyprus, Juan Paolo Gradenigo, wrote to his government from Nicosia on April 29, 1515:

I confirm that Señor Sofi (Shah Ismail) has collected more than 100 thousand warriors and has acquired many cannons... They also say that Sofi will approach the border of Turkey, and the Turks will retreat.

Another document from 1518 stated that:

Sophie is in Tabriz with 70,000 warriors. Among them are soldiers armed with rifles and artillery specialists sent by the King of Portugal.

During the Venetian-Ottoman war (1537-1570), Venetian-Safavid relations improved. In 1539, Venice sent Michel Membre as ambassador to the Safavid Empire. In 1570, Vincenzo degli Alessandri and the Safavid merchant Haji Ali Tabrizi were sent to Qazvin. None of them could provide military assistance to the Safavids. In turn, the Safavid Empire, which was attacked by the Ottoman Empire in 1578, turned to Venice for help. The merchant Haji Muhammad was sent to Venice as an envoy of Shah Muhammad Khudabanda. He informed the Doge and the senate that the Safavid Empire was again at war with the Ottoman Empire and asked for "moral support" from the Republic of Venice. Although Haji Muhammad was warmly welcomed by Venice and seen off with kind words, he practically did not achieve any success. Because Venice signed a peace treaty with the Ottoman Empire in 1573 and did not want to start a new war. Another Safavid envoy was sent to Venice in 1600, this time by Shah Abbas I. The messenger this time was a merchant named Asad Bey.

=== 17th century ===
He was followed in 1602 by the Venetian Angelo Gradenigo, in 1603 by Fathi Bey and Muhammad Amin Bey. After that, in 1609–1610, Haji Kirakos and Haji Safar also participated in the negotiations as ambassadors. This function was continued in 1613 by Aladdin Muhammad and Haji Shahsever. These ambassadors returned to Venice in 1622 together with other merchants. All of them were called "gerekyarakan-e hasse-ye sherife". However, in 1601 Anthony Shirley and Hossein Ali Beg Bayat, two Safavid ambassadors dispatched to Venice during this time, were not permitted to enter the city and deliver their letters and credentials to the Doge. Relations between the Safavid king Abbas I and the Sagredo family of Venice began in 1608. In this year, Abbas I appointed Giovanni Francesco Sagredo (Alvise Sagredo's uncle), the Venetian consul in Aleppo, as the Safavid envoy to Syria. Three years later, in 1611, he appointed Giovanni Francesco as his chief consul in the city of Venice and the entire province of Venice. Probably in 1626, Alvise Sagredo, who served as vice-consul under his uncle, wrote to Shah Abbas I about the possibility of sending his agent Alvise Parente to the Safavids for trade. The Shah responded by personally inviting Alvise to come to the country in 1627 and engage in free trade. The Senate authorized Sagredo's visit in 1629, and he left Venice that same year, unaware that Shah Abbas I had died in the meantime. In Aleppo, Shah I had to wait for new letters of attorney in the name of Safavids and a Safavid passport. He eventually left Syria for Venice. The fact that the Safavids had a real interest in the commercial presence of Venice in the country was also confirmed by Alvise Sagredo's reminder of the letter sent by Shah Safi to the Doge through Ali Bali. In this letter, the Shah invited Sagredo to come to the country, "to trade in a manner similar to the trade of the English and the Dutch".

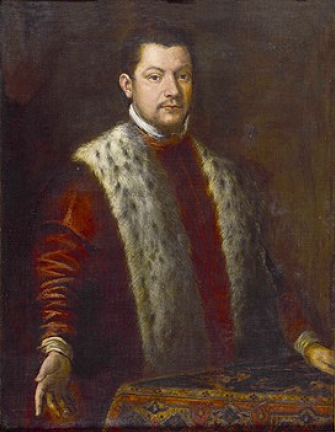
Giovanni Francesco Sagredo

In 1634, a messenger named Ali Bali was sent to Venice to inform Venice that Safi I ascended the Safavid throne. This envoy was the last Muslim ambassador of the Safavid court to Venice. With the outbreak of the Cretan War in 1645, which would last until 1669, Venice started “diplomatic offensive” to find allies against the Ottomans. Giovanni Tiepolo was sent to the King of Poland on a mission from the republic. On his return the following year, Giovanni arrived in Venice with a Polish envoy who had been commissioned to deliver a letter from his king to the Safavid king. The Polish envoy Jerzy Ilicz was sent to the Safavid palace together with the Dominican priest Antonio da Fiandra. In 1646, the Venetian government sent another emissary named Domenico de Santis to the king. This messenger reached the Safavid palace by crossing the road to Aleppo. In response, Ferdinando Gioverida (a Catholic priest and relative of Petra della Valle's first wife) left for Venice in 1647. Father Antonio was able to convey himself to the Collegium in the Palazzo Ducale on March 28, 1650. De Santis probably reached Venice in 1651. During the return trip, de Santis, who was going from Isfahan to Tarku, was not given permission to enter the territory of the Russian Empire, so his return took longer. Gioverida reached the Collegium exactly one year before Antonio – on March 28, 1650. The 3 embassies had brought nothing but sincere declarations of friendship from the Shah. The Safavid side did not make any clear statement about the specific alliance. As a result, further negotiations between Venice and the Safavid Empire were carried out by missionaries and Catholic clergy. In 1661, a letter addressed to the king was sent by an anonymous person, in 1662, Arakel was used, and in 1663, the Dominican priest Antonio Tani was used. In the letter of 1661, Venice's appeal to the Safavid Empire to join the war against the Ottoman Empire was repeated. In 1663, the senators did not find it appropriate to make such a request in writing and asked Arakel to convey it to the shah orally. In 1669, Archbishop Mateos Avanik was sent to the Safavid Empire, and in 1673, one of the Armenian Dominican priests arrived in Venice with a letter from the king and Mateos. The latter stated that despite his pleas to the Safavid emperor Suleiman I to attack the Ottomans, he eventually received word that Crete had been captured by the Ottomans, and his efforts were not successful. Two Dominicans were given a reply letter to the king. According to Berchet, this was the last Safavid diplomatic mission to Venice. In later years, especially during the War of the Holy League, additional letters were sent to the Safavids, delivered by an unknown envoy in 1695 and two papal envoys, Pietro Paolo Pignatelli in 1697 and Felice Maria da Sellano in 1699. Only the first of these letters called the king to war, the other two simply confirmed Venice's favorable attitude towards him.

=== 18th century ===
In the Second Morean War, the last Ottoman-Venetian war, no alliance was offered to the Safavids. In 1718, the Safavid emperor Soltan Hoseyn received a letter from the Venetian senate, asking him to defend the Catholic Armenians of Tbilisi and the Capuchin missionaries from attacks by the Gregorian Armenians.

== Sources ==
- Guliyev, Ahmad (2022). Safavids in Venetian and European Sources (PDF). Venice: Edizioni Ca’ Foscari.
- Najafli, Tofig (2015). "Azərbaycan Səfəvi dövlətinin Venesiya və Papalıqla münasibətləri Türkiyə tarixşünaslığında" (PDF). GEO Strategiya. I. Archived from the original (PDF) on 2019-07-11.
- Rota, Giorgio (2012). "Safavid Persia and Its Diplomatic Relations with Venice". In Floor, Willem; Herzig, Edmund (eds.). Iran and the World in the Safavid Age. I.B. Tauris & Co. Ltd.
