= Bogdan Gurdziecki =

Polish diplomat

Bogdan Gurdziecki (known in Persia as Bohtam Beg) (died April 12, 1700) was a Georgia-born Polish diplomat who served as the first permanent Polish resident in Safavid Persia.

Born in Georgia into a noble Georgian family, Gurdziecki served the Polish crown since the early 1650s. The surname derives from Turkish / Iranian name for Georgians "Gurdji". As the greatest authority on all things Persian, he was dispatched to Isfahan as a head of Polish diplomatic mission, part of the joint Russo-Polish diplomatic and economic efforts in Persia aimed at bringing the Safavid government into an anti-Ottoman alliance. Henceforth, Gurdziecki played a role in diplomacy between Poland and Persia as well as in some Russo-Georgian interaction. He died in Moscow in 1700.

== See also ==
- Jerzy Ilicz
