= John Shalikashvili =

US Army general (1936–2011)

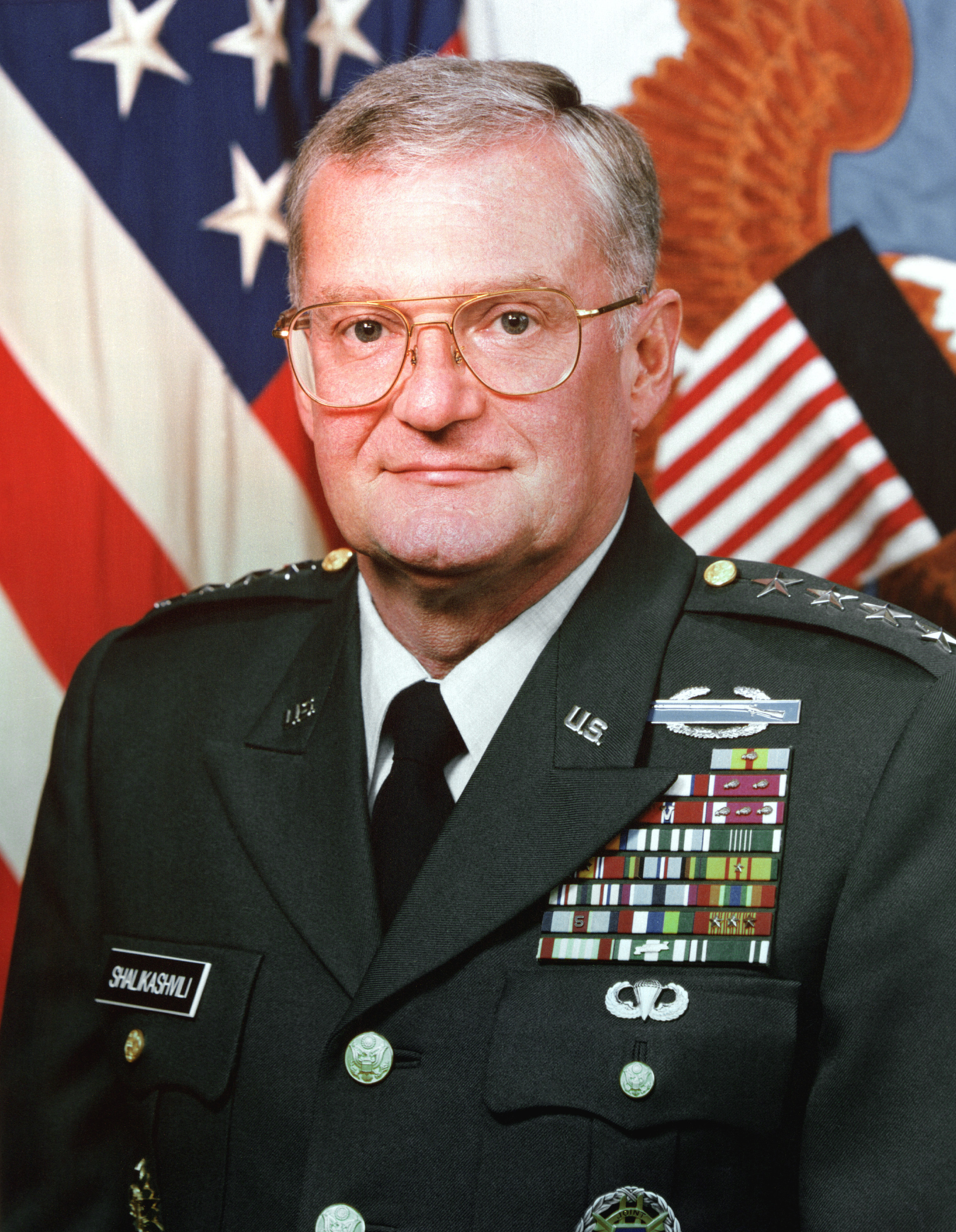
- Official portrait, 1993
- Born: 27 June 1936; Warsaw, Second Polish Republic
- Died: 23 July 2011 (aged 75); Joint Base Lewis-McChord, Washington, U.S.
- Burial place: Arlington National Cemetery
- Education: Bradley University; George Washington University
- Spouses: Gunhild Bartsch (m. 1963; died 1965) Joan Zimpelman (m. 1966, died)
- Children: 2
- Military career
- Allegiance: United States
- Branch: United States Army
- Service years: 1958–1997
- Rank: General
- Nickname: "General Shali"
- Commands: Chairman of the Joint Chiefs of Staff; Supreme Allied Commander Europe; Operation Provide Comfort; 9th Infantry Division; 1st Battalion, 84th Field Artillery
- Conflicts: Vietnam War; Operation Provide Comfort; Iraqi no-fly zones Third Taiwan Strait Crisis
- Awards: Defense Distinguished Service Medal (4); Army Distinguished Service Medal; Legion of Merit (3); Bronze Star Medal (V); Meritorious Service Medal (4); Air Medal; Joint Service Commendation Medal; Army Commendation Medal; Presidential Medal of Freedom
- Other work: Visiting professor, Stanford University; Director, Frank Russell Trust Company; Director, L-3 Communications Holdings, Inc. Director, Plug Power Inc. Director, United Defense Industries, Inc.

John Malchase David Shalikashvili (Georgian: ჯონ მალხაზ დავით შალიკაშვილი, romanized: jon malkhaz davit shalik'ashvili, IPA: [ʃalikʼaʃʷili]; 27 June 1936 – 23 July 2011) was a United States Army general who served as Supreme Allied Commander Europe from 1992 to 1993 and the 13th chairman of the Joint Chiefs of Staff from 1993 to 1997. He was born in Warsaw, Poland, in the family of émigré Georgian officer Dimitri Shalikashvili and his naturalized-Polish wife Maria Rüdiger-Belyaeva. In 1996, he was the first recipient of the Naval War College Distinguished Graduate Leadership Award.

Shalikashvili was the first, and as of 2023 only, Chairman of the Joint Chiefs of Staff not born in the United States. He served in every level of unit command from platoon to division. Shalikashvili died of a stroke in 2011 at the age of 75.

== Early life and education ==
Shalikashvili was a scion of the medieval Georgian noble house of Shalikashvili. His father was Prince Dimitri Shalikashvili (1896–1978), born in Gurjaani, who served in the army of Imperial Russia. His mother was Countess Maria Rüdiger-Belyaeva.

After the Bolshevik Revolution, Dimitri became a lieutenant colonel in the army of the Democratic Republic of Georgia. When the Soviet Union invaded and occupied Georgia in 1921, Dimitri was on diplomatic service in Turkey. Dimitri then joined other Georgian exiles in Poland, where he met and married John's mother, Maria; she was Polish and of part German ancestry, and the daughter of Count Rudiger-Bielajew (Rüdiger-Belyaev), a former Tsarist general. They had three children: Othar, John and Gale. Dimitri served in the Polish Army (along with other Georgian exiles) as a contract officer.

In 1939, the elder Shalikashvili fought against the German invasion of Poland. After the Polish defeat, Dimitri was demobilized. In 1941, he enlisted in the Georgian Legion, a force of ethnic Georgians recruited by Germany to fight against the Soviet Union. The unit was later incorporated into the SS-Waffengruppe Georgien and transferred to Normandy. Dimitri surrendered to British forces and was a prisoner of war until after the war. A collection of Dimitri Shalikashvili's writings are on deposit at the Hoover Institution. Meanwhile, Maria, John and his two brothers lived through the destruction of Warsaw. As the Red Army approached Warsaw in 1944, the family fled to Pappenheim, Germany, being reunited with Dimitri along the way. It was in Pappenheim in the closing days of World War II that John first laid eyes on U.S. soldiers. His family stayed with relatives there in Pappenheim for eight years.

In 1952, when Shalikashvili was 16, the family emigrated to the US, and settled in Peoria, Illinois. They were sponsored by Winifred Luthy, the wife of a local banker, who was previously married to Dimitri's cousin. The Luthys and the Episcopal Church helped the Shalikashvili family get started, finding jobs and a home for them. Dimitri worked for Ameren, and Maria was a file clerk at Commercial National Bank. When Shalikashvili arrived in Peoria he spoke little English:

I spoke a little bit [of English]. But not much beyond yes and no and what time is it. And the stories that subsequently have been told that I learned English by watching John Wayne movies is only a little bit of a stretch ... As school was over [at Peoria High School], I would run to the local movie theater. There I would sit through movies in order to learn English. In those days movies didn't start at a specific time and end at a specific time, but they would roll continuously ... The first time through it wouldn't make much sense to me. But the second time through, it would begin to make a little more sense. Now in my memory, that is probably very faulty, a lot of those movies were John Wayne movies or at least were Wild West movies.

Shalikashvili went to Peoria High School, where he was a long-distance runner. He attended Bradley University in Peoria and received a bachelor's degree in mechanical engineering in 1958. He was a member of Theta Chi. In 1970, Shalikashvili received a master's degree in international affairs from the George Washington University's School of International Affairs.

In May 1958, Shalikashvili and his family became U.S. citizens. It was the first nationality he ever held. He had previously been classified as stateless because he had been born to parents who were refugees.

== Military career ==
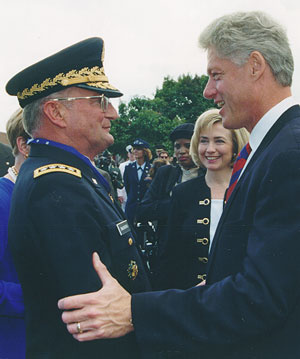
Shalikashvili with U.S. President Clinton

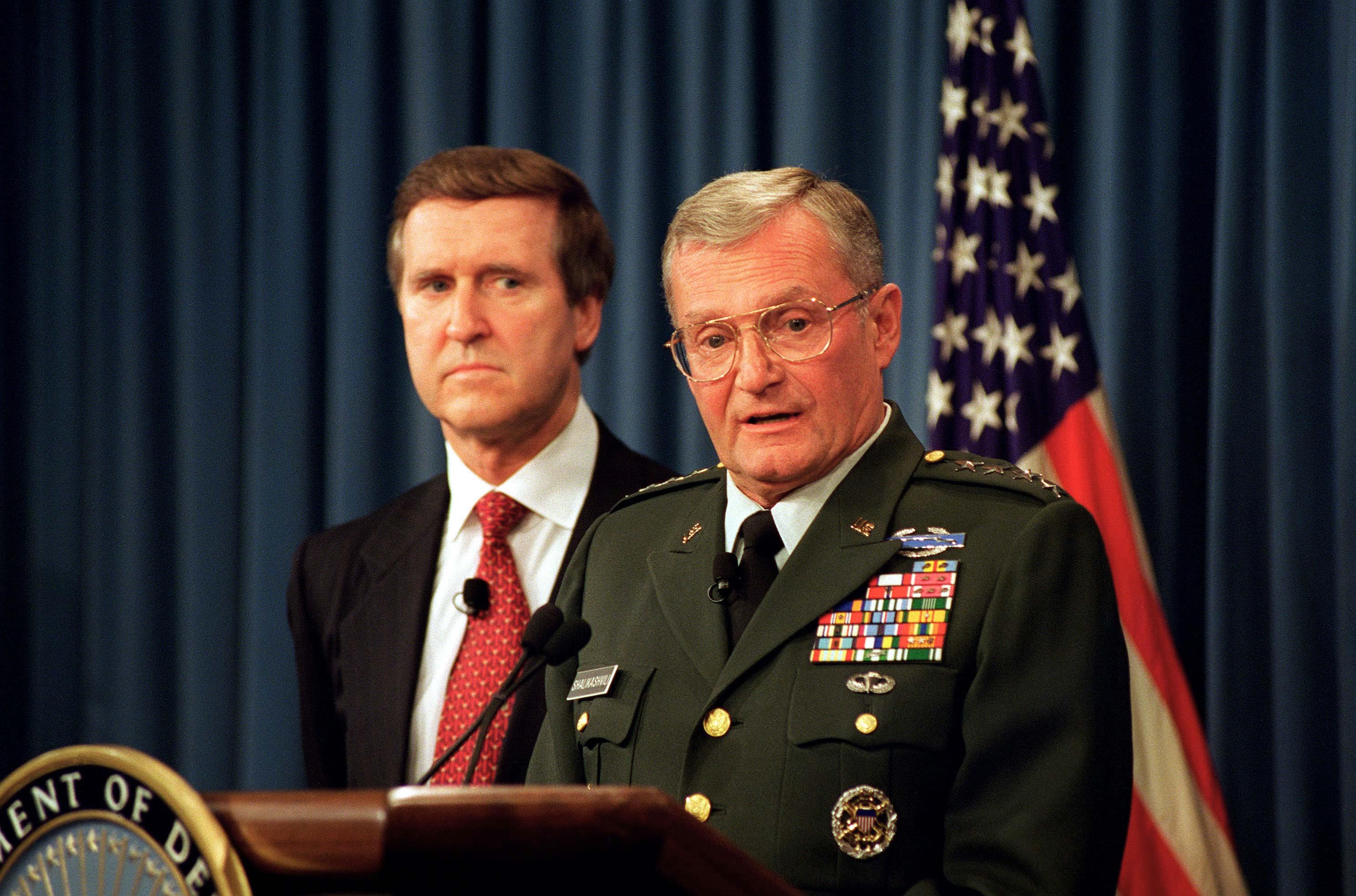
U.S. Secretary of Defense William Cohen (left) and Shalikashvili (right) at a Pentagon briefing on 31 July 1997

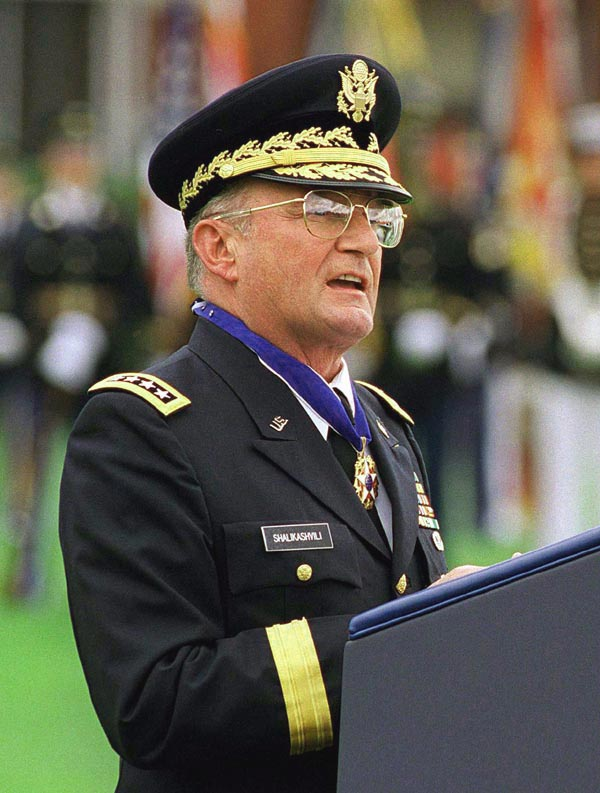
Shalikashvili at his farewell ceremony on 30 September 1997

After graduation Shalikashvili had planned to work for Hyster, but received a draft notice in July 1958. He entered the United States Army as a private, enjoyed it, and applied to the Army's Officer Candidate School. He was commissioned as a second lieutenant in 1959.

Shalikashvili served in various Field Artillery and Air Defense Artillery positions as a platoon leader, forward observer, instructor, and student, in various staff positions, and as a battery commander. He served in the Vietnam War in Quang Tri Province with Advisory Team 4 (redesignated Team 19 in September, 1968), Military Assistance Command, Vietnam (MACV), as a senior district advisor from 1968 to 1969. He was awarded a Bronze Star Medal with "V" for heroism during his Vietnam tour. Immediately after his Vietnam service, he attended the Naval War College in Newport, Rhode Island.

In 1970, Shalikashvili became executive officer of the 2nd Battalion, 18th Field Artillery at Fort Lewis, Washington. Later in 1975, he commanded the 1st Battalion, 84th Field Artillery, 9th Infantry Division at Fort Lewis. In 1977, he attended the U.S. Army War College and served as the Commander of Division Artillery (DIVARTY) for the 1st Armored Division in Germany. He later became the assistant division commander. In 1987, Shalikashvili commanded the 9th Infantry Division at Fort Lewis. There he oversaw a "high technology test bed" tasked to integrate three brigades—one heavy armor, one light infantry, and one "experimental mechanized"—into a new type of fighting force.

Shalikashvili commanded Operation Provide Comfort, a peacekeeping and humanitarian mission in northern Iraq following the Gulf War. His role included negotiations with the Turkish government and direct meetings with the Iraqi military. Additionally, he established the Joint Vision 2010 program, which aimed to modernize the United States military into a digitalized force.

Shalikashvili was appointed Chairman of the Joint Chiefs of Staff in 1993 by President Bill Clinton, effective October 25. During the 1995-96 Third Taiwan Strait Crisis, he commanded the US Navy to assist in the defense of Taiwan.

He retired from the Army in September 1997, after serving for 38 years.

== Later life and death ==
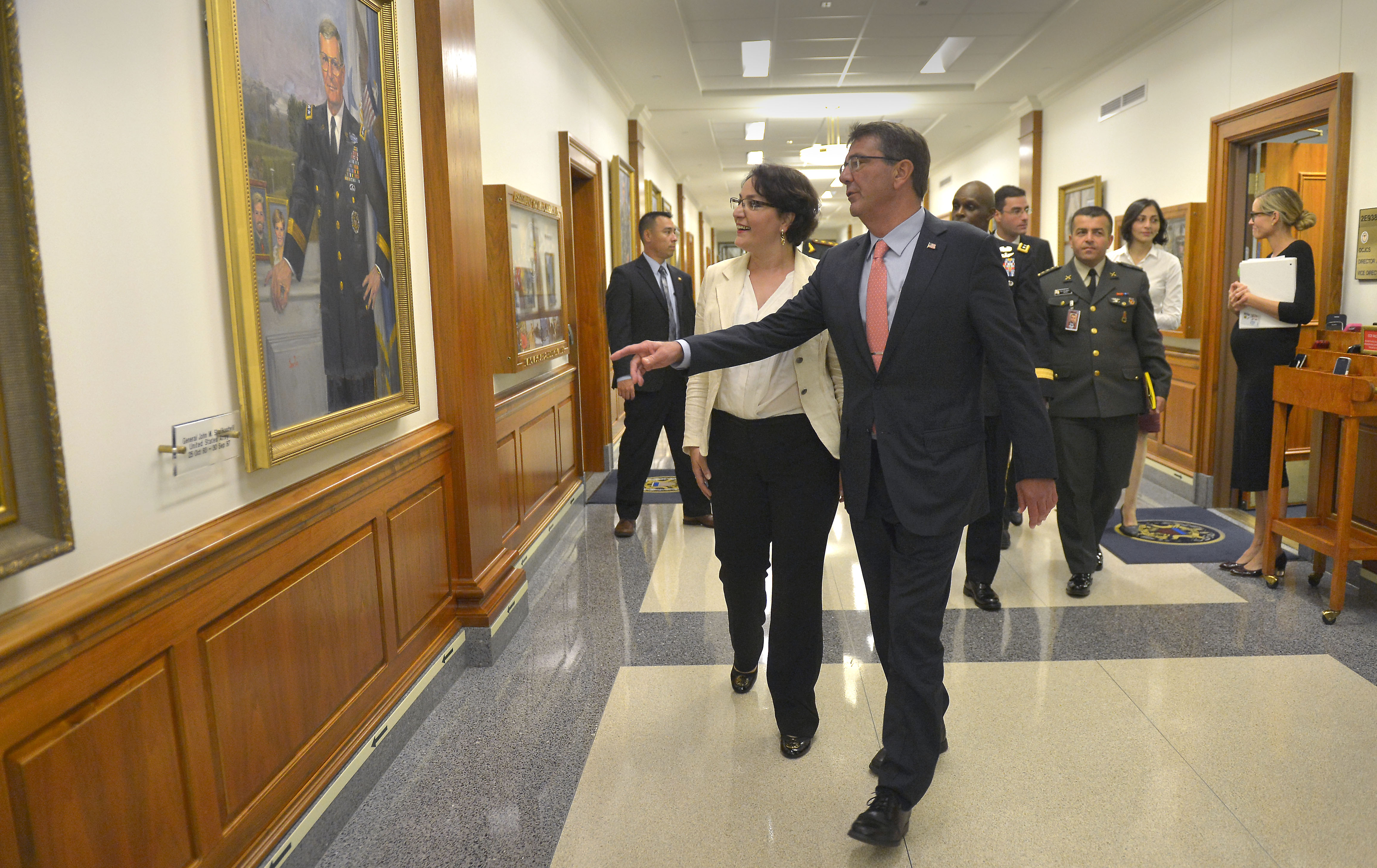
Ashton Carter shows Tinatin Khidasheli an official portrait of General Shalikashvili, 2015

Shalikashvili was an advisor to John Kerry's 2004 Presidential campaign. He was a visiting professor at the Center for International Security and Cooperation at Stanford University. He served as a director of Russell Investments, L-3 Communications, Inc., Plug Power Inc., United Defense, Inc., the Initiative for Global Development, and the National Bureau of Asian Research.

Shalikashvili was married to Joan and had one son, Brant, a graduate of Washington State University, and a daughter, Debra.

Shalikashvili suffered a severe stroke on 7 August 2004 that paralyzed his left side.

In 2006 the National Bureau of Asian Research (NBR) launched the John M. Shalikashvili Chair in National Security Studies to recognize Shalikashvili for his years of military service and for his leadership on NBR's Board of Directors.

In 2007, Shalikashvili penned an op-ed in The New York Times calling for a reversal of Don't ask, don't tell. A similar op-ed by him appeared in the 19 June 2009, issue of The Washington Post. The policy was reversed 22 July 2011, the day before his death.

Shalikashvili died at the age of 75 on 23 July 2011, at the Madigan Army Medical Center in Joint Base Lewis-McChord, Washington, from a stroke. He is buried at Arlington National Cemetery in Virginia.

The first biography on Shalikashvili, "Boy on the Bridge: The Story of John Shalikashvili's American Success," was published by the University Press of Kentucky in conjunction with the Association of the U.S. Army in October 2019.

== Ancestry ==
Ancestors of John M. Shalikashvili

8. Prince Ivane Shalikashvili
4. Prince Ioseb Shalikashvili
9. Princess Daria Chavchavadze
2. Prince Dimitri Shalikashvili
10. Dmitry Staroselsky
5. Nina Staroselskaya
11. Princess Ekaterine Guramishvili
1. John M. Shalikashvili
12. Alexei Belyaev
6. Alexander Belyaev
13. Maria Daler
3. Countess Maria Rüdiger-Belyaeva
14. Count Fyodor Rüdiger
7. Countess Maria Rüdiger
15. Sofia von Krusenstern

== Dates of rank ==
Rank	Date
Second lieutenant	7 July 1959
First lieutenant	7 July 1961
Captain	8 July 1963
Major	23 August 1967
Lieutenant colonel	12 May 1974
Colonel	6 December 1978
Brigadier general	1 August 1983
Major general	1 September 1986
Lieutenant general	1 October 1989
General	24 June 1992

== Awards and decorations ==

Badge	Combat Infantryman Badge		
1st row	Defense Distinguished Service Medal	Distinguished Service Medal	Legion of Merit
2nd row	Bronze Star Medal	Meritorious Service Medal	Air Medal
3rd row	Joint Service Commendation Medal	Army Commendation Medal	Presidential Medal of Freedom
4th row	National Defense Service Medal with one bronze service star	Armed Forces Expeditionary Medal	Vietnam Service Medal
5th row	Southwest Asia Service Medal with service star	Humanitarian Service Medal	Army Service Ribbon
6th row	Army Overseas Service Ribbon	Inter-American Defense Board Medal	Vietnam Gallantry Cross with two silver and one bronze star
7th row	Armed Forces Honor Medal, 1st class (Vietnam)	Commander of the Order of the White Lion (Czech Republic)	Grand Cross of the Order of Merit of the Republic of Poland
8th row	Meritorious Service Medal of Canada	Vietnam Campaign Medal	Order of Military Merit of Brazil, Grand-Officer
Badge	Parachutist Badge		
Badges	Office of the Joint Chiefs of Staff Identification Badge		United States Army Staff Identification Badge
Badge	9th Infantry Division Combat Service Identification Badge		

- GEN Shalikashvili received at least two more foreign awards.

=== Other Recognition ===
In 1994, Shalikashvili received the Golden Plate Award of the American Academy of Achievement.

In 2006, The National Bureau of Asian Research recognized board member General John M. Shalikashvili for his lifelong contributions to our nation and dedicated a chair in national security studies in his name, The John M. Shalikashvili Chair in National Security Studies.

Military offices
Preceded by Gen. John Galvin	Supreme Allied Commander Europe; 1992–1993	Succeeded by Gen. George Joulwan
Preceded by Adm. David E. Jeremiah (acting Chairman)	Chairman of the Joint Chiefs of Staff; 1993–1997	Succeeded by Gen. Hugh Shelton
