= Valerian Tevzadze =

Georgian military officer (1894–1985)

- Born: ვალერიან თევზაძე 10 February 1894
- Died: 13 December 1985 (aged 91); Dzierżoniów, Poland
- Military career
- Rank: infantry lieutenant colonel (Polish: podpułkownik dyplomowany piechoty)
- Nickname: "Tomasz"
- Units: Regular Army of the Georgian Democratic Republic; Polish Armed Forces; Home Army
- Conflicts: World War I; World War II; • 1939 defensive war; • Operation Tempest
- Awards: Virtuti Militari (V Class)

Valerian Tevzadze (Georgian: ვალერიან თევზაძე, Polish: Walerian Tewzadze) (February 10, 1894 – December 13, 1985) was a Georgian military officer of the Democratic Republic of Georgia and later Poland, member of the Polish underground resistance movement during the occupation of Poland.

He was in the service of the Democratic Republic of Georgia (1918-1921). After the Soviet forces occupied the country, he left for Poland and joined the Polish army as a colonel. During the Nazi invasion of 1939, he took part in the northern defense of Warsaw. He was later awarded with the Silver Cross of the Virtuti Militari. During the German occupation of Poland he joined the Polish Home Army. As part of the Polish underground resistance movement he used the pseudonym Tomasz. After the Red Army took control of Poland, Valerian Tevzadze joined the Polish underground against the communists until his death in 1985.

He lived in Dzierżoniów, where he died. He was buried at the local cemetery. An inscription is carved on his grave: „Jako Gruzin chciałbym być pochowany w Gruzji, ale jestem szczęśliwy, że będę pochowany w ziemi szlachetnego i dzielnego Narodu Polskiego” (As a Georgian I would like to be buried in Georgia, but I am happy to be buried in the land of the noble and brave Polish nation.)

== Memory ==
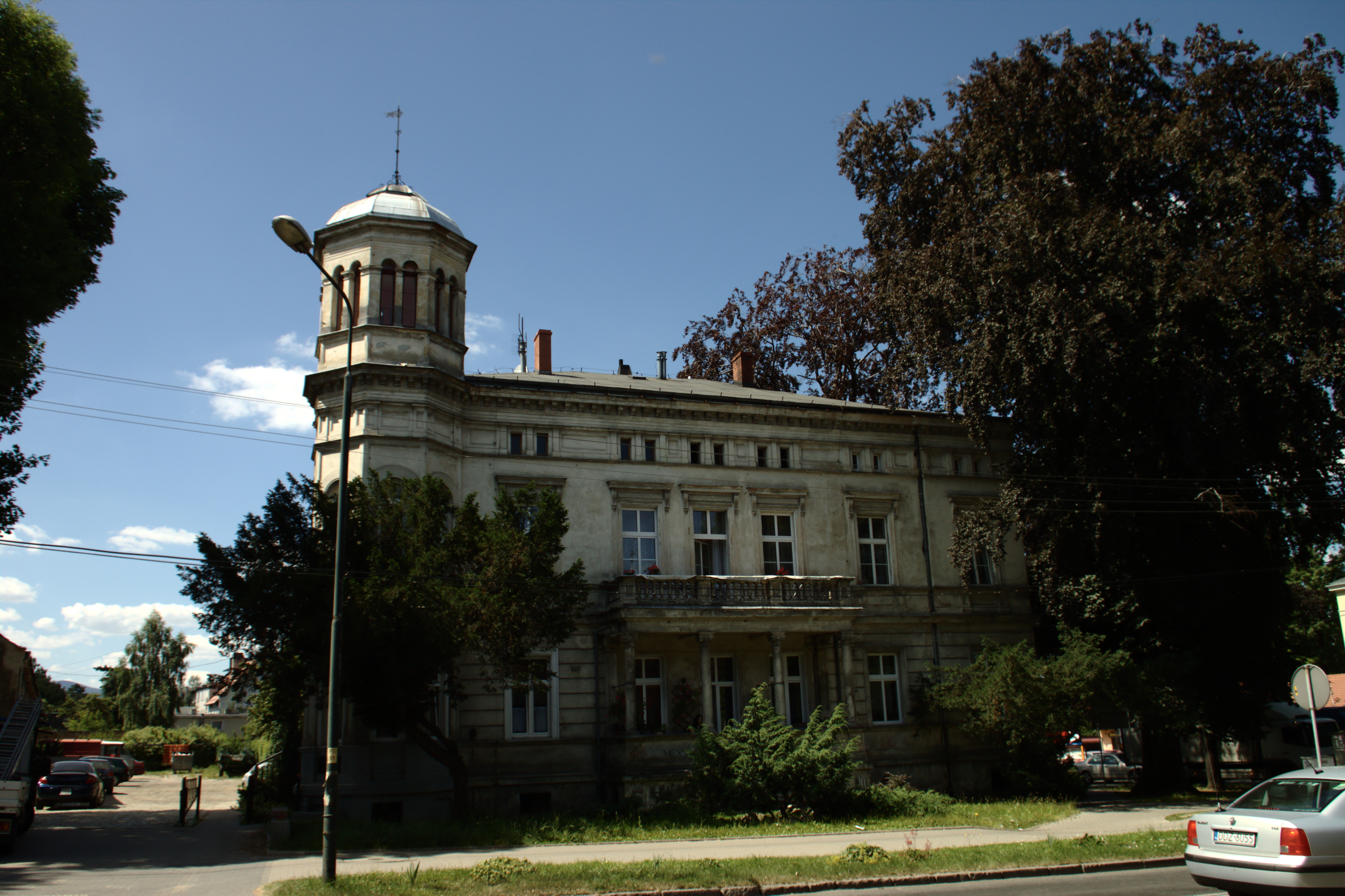
House of Valerian Tevzadze in Dzierżoniów, Poland

On the facade of Tevzadze's house in Dzierżoniów, there is a memorial plaque.

Tevzadze is one of the people portrayed in the documentary film W rogatywce i tygrysiej skórze, directed by Jerzy Lubach.

In 2009, a monument dedicated to Tevzadze was unveiled in front of the headquarters of the Spółdzielnia Mieszkaniowa (Housing Cooperative) in Dzierżoniów in the presence of the Georgian ambassador to Poland Konstantine Kavtaradze.

In 2019, Polish Prime Minister Mateusz Morawiecki visited the tomb of Valerian Tevzadze at the Dzierżoniów cemetery.

The annual chess tournament named Tewzadze Open is organized in Dzierżoniów, to commemorate Tevzadze.

== Sources ==
- Marian Porwit, "Obrona Warszawy 1939 r.", Czytelnik, Warszawa 1979,
- Wojciech Borzobohaty, "Jodła", PAX, Warszawa 1984,
- Jarosław Kresa, "Dobry człowiek, a jak krzemień twardy", "Twoja Spółdzielnia", Dzierżoniów, kwiecień 2008
- (in English) Pro Georgia 2008, Edited by David Kolbaia
