= Shio Aragvispireli =

Georgian writer

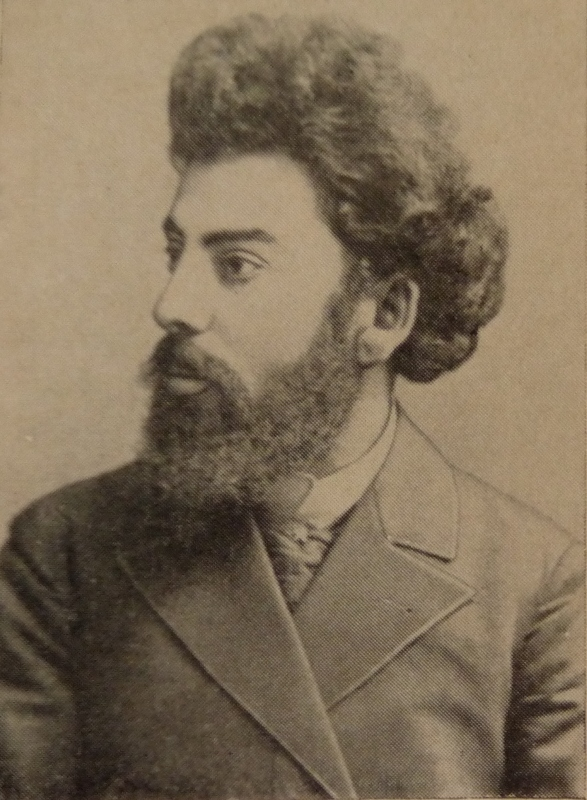
Shio Aragvispireli

Shio Aragvispireli (Georgian: შიო არაგვისპირელი) was a penname of Shio Dedabrishvili Georgian: შიო დედაბრიშვილი; December 14, 1867 – January 2, 1926), a Georgian writer popular for his stories of protest against social inequality, the reality of oppressed peasants and underlings and decadent lords, and the struggle between individual happiness and social dogmas.

He was born into a priest’s family near Dusheti, and enrolled in the Tbilisi Theological Seminary in 1883. In 1887, he was excluded from the seminary for his rebellious ideas, but restored again in 1889. From 1890 to 1895 he studied at the Warsaw veterinary college, where he engaged in a student underground society. He was arrested by the Imperial Russian police for having formed the League for Georgia’s Freedom in Warsaw. He then worked as a veterinary inspector in the Tbilisi slaughterhouse, until he was sacked as a "whistle-blower" in a scandal about contaminated pork. Aragvispireli brought his personal working experience into a series of short stories from 1895 and quickly won popularity. One of his best stories, It's Earth (მიწაა) appeared in 1901. It was a story of a consumptive Georgian convict exiled to Siberia and killed there for refusing to throw away a bag of Georgian earth he has kept for his grave. Aragvispireli married contemporary European influences, particularly Maupassant and Przybyszewski to native traditions of idealization of the primitive typical to the Georgian mountaineer writers such as Alexander Kazbegi. In his drama Shio the Prince (შიო თავადი, 1905), he took a Symbolist view of Georgian history, but it failed. His most successful work, the novel A Fractured Heart (გაბზარული გული, 1920), was a sentimental fairy-tale of the love of a princess and a goldsmith. It even earned appraisal from the Soviet critics who had frequently attacked Aragvispireli’s gruesome Expressionism. His later years were unproductive.

He died on 2 January 1926 in Tiflis.
