= Giorgi Eristavi =

Prince Giorgi Eristavi

Giorgi Eristavi (Georgian: გიორგი ერისთავი) (1813 – 9 September 1864) was a Georgian playwright, poet, journalist, and the founder of modern Georgian theatre.

Prince Giorgi Eristavi was born in the village of Odzisi (near Dusheti) of a prominent noble family, who had once served as the eristavi ("duke") of Ksani for the kings of Georgia. He received his early education in Tiflis and Moscow. On return to Georgia, he became involved with the underground society which plotted a coup against the Imperial Russian rule. He had his first poem published in 1832. This was An Ossetic Tale (ოსური მოთხრობა; revised and republished as Zare and Qanimat, ზარე და ყანიმათ, in 1853), a story of ill-fated lovers set against the background of the struggle of Georgian and Ossetian mountaineers against the Persian armies of Shah Abbas I in the 17th century.

After the collapse of the anti-Russian plot in 1832, Eristavi spent a year in prison and four years as an exiled infantryman in Wilno (now Vilnius, Lithuania), where he mastered Polish and came under the influence of Adam Mickiewicz's Romanticism. In 1842, he was able to permanently return to Georgia where he married and joined the Russian civil service soon to become assistant to the Viceroy of the Caucasus Mikhail Vorontsov. Under the patronage of this liberal viceroy, Eristavi took charge of the Georgian theatre in Tiflis, dormant since 1795.

The company premiered on 1 January 1851 and was later able to stage its performances in the new theatre building in the city’s central square. He almost single-handedly created and directed a troupe and wrote first actable comedies – original as well as translated – in which he himself took leading parts. He also created and edited the 24 issues of the literary journal Tsiskari ("Down") and, under the pseudonym Glukharich (Russian for "son of the deaf, or capercaillie"), wrote the first literary reviews. In spite of Eristavi’s loyal service in the Russian administration, the imperial government as well as the eroding system of Georgian aristocracy was a frequent subject of indignation and satire in his best plays such as The Lawsuit (დავა; 1840), and The Family Settlement (გაყრა; 1849). Eristavi boldly attacks a degenerating Georgian noble, who has lost all of his ideals and has much envy and anger, exploiting his serfs; a corrupt Russian bureaucrat and an Armenian money-lender who exploit the feuding gentry; and treats the newer, Russian-educated generation of idealist liberals with condescending sympathy. These plays had a popular support and were tolerated by Vorontsov.

However, after Vorontsov's departure from Georgia in 1854, Eristavi was forced to resign. He retired to the village of Khidistavi near Gori. His protégé and successor, Ivane Kereselidze, was able to keep the company for only two years and, in 1856, the theatre went defunct. Apart from comedies, lyrics and journalism, Eristavi also wrote an account of his 1862 journey to London to inspect machinery. He died in Gori in 1864 and was buried at the Ikorta church.
