= Zakaria Bakradze =

Georgian military officer

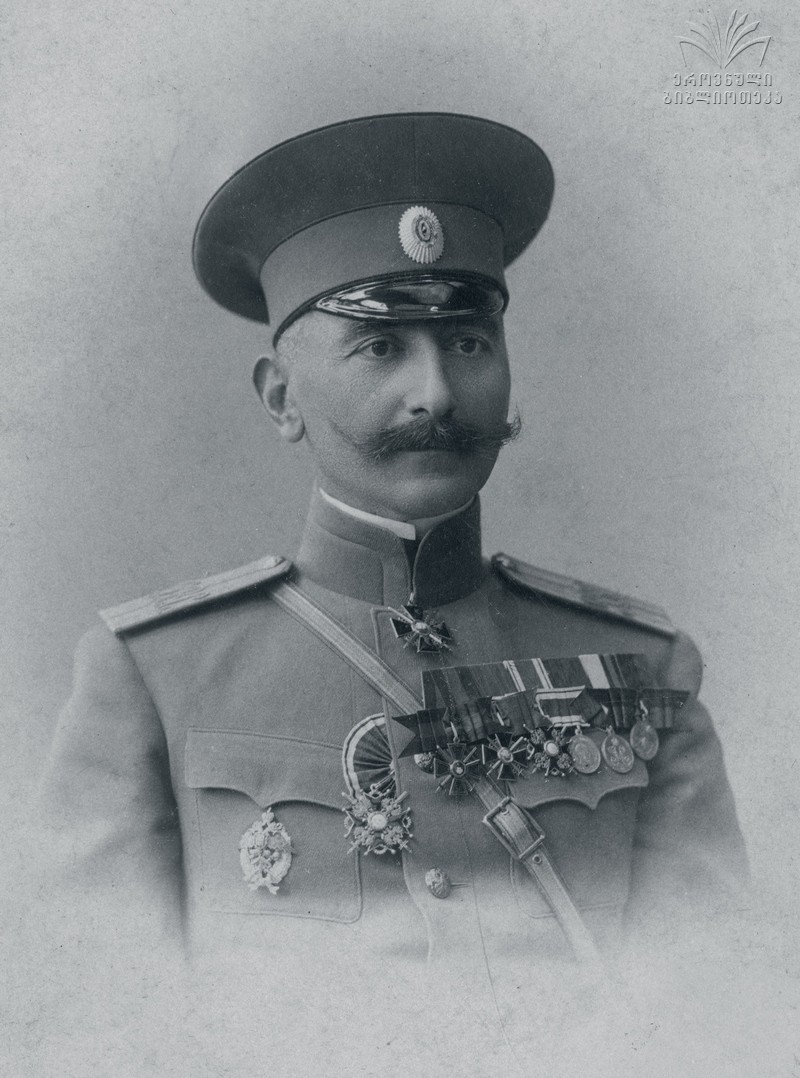
Portrait of Bakradze in his Georgian military uniform

Zakaria (Shakro) Bakradze (Georgian: ზაქარია (შაქრო) ბაქრაძე, Polish: Zachariasz Bakradze; 22 October 1868, in Tbilisi – 3 December 1938) was a Georgian military officer who served as a general in the Democratic Republic of Georgia and later the Polish Army.

== Family and education ==
Zakaria Bakradze was born to the family of Dimitri Bakradze (1826–1890), a prominent Georgian historian. He graduated from the Tiflis Cadet Corps (1890), the Moscow Infantry Cadet School (military school course, graduated to the 10th Infantry Regiment), the Officer Rifle School.

== Military career ==
He began his military career in the Imperial Russian army and distinguished himself during the First World War. After the establishment of the Democratic Republic of Georgia in 1918, he joined the national army and was a high-ranking official of the Ministry of Defence. The Soviet invasion of Georgia in 1921 forced him (along with thousands of other Georgian officers) into exile in Poland, where he received further training in the Higher War School. He then served in the Polish Army as Commander of Infantry (de facto deputy commander) of the Polish 15th Infantry Division.

- Member of the Chinese campaign of 1900-1901
- Member of the Russian-Japanese War
- Member of the First World War. In 1914 he was promoted to colonel for military distinction.
- Armeno-Georgian War, 1918

He was killed in a road accident near Bydgoszcz on 3 December 1938.

== Notes and references ==
- (in Georgian) Javakhishvili, Niko. "ქართველი მხედრები პოლონეთის დროშის ქვეშ" [Georgian soldiers under the Polish Banners]. Tbilisi, 1998.
