= Alexandre Chkheidze =

Polish-Georgian military officer

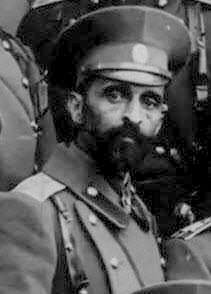
- Born: 1878
- Died: 1941 (aged 62–63) Moscow
- Allegiance: Russian Empire Democratic Republic of Georgia Second Polish Republic
- Branch: Imperial Russian Army Polish Land Forces
- Conflicts: First World War Red Army invasion of Georgia Second World War

Alexandre Chkheidze, also known under his Polish name of Aleksander Czcheidze (1878–1941), was a Polish-Georgian military officer. He served with the rank of Colonel in the armed forces of the Democratic Republic of Georgia during the short period of its independence following World War I. Following the Bolshevik occupation of his country, Chkheidze (along with thousands of other Georgian officers) migrated to Poland, where he received further training in the Higher War School.

He was then admitted to the Polish Army as a contract officer and served as the Commander of Infantry (de facto deputy commander) of the Polish 16th Infantry Division. He took part in the Polish Defensive War of 1939 and fought with distinction in a number of battles. Taken prisoner by the Germans, he was handed over to the USSR in accordance with the Ribbentrop-Molotov Pact. He was executed by the NKVD in 1941 in Moscow.
