= Ivane Kazbegi =

Ivane Kazbegi (Georgian: ივანე ყაზბეგი; Polish: Jan [Iwan] Kazbek; Russian: Иван Николаевич Казбек, Ivan Nikolayevich Kazbek) (June 11, 1860 — December 2, 1943) was a Georgian soldier, who served, successively, in the Imperial Russian, Georgian and Polish armies.

Ivane Kazbegi was born into the family of noble descent. Trained at a military college in St. Petersburg, he joined the Imperial Russian army in 1878. As an artillery lieutenant-colonel, he took part in the Russo-Japanese war of 1904-05. He was promoted to the rank of colonel in 1912 and to that of major-general in 1915. During World War I, Kazbegi was a deputy commander of the Caucasian Grenadier Artillery Brigade. After Georgia's declaration of independence in 1918, he served for the Georgian Ministry of War and headed its administrative division. The Soviet invasion of Georgia in 1921 forced him into exile to Constantinople, whence he moved to Poland in 1922. Like many of his Georgian colleagues, Kazbegi became a contract officer for the Polish army. In 1926, he became a major general in the Polish service and lectured at the Military Academy. He retired in 1934 and died in Warsaw, being interred at the Powązki Military Cemetery.

After Kazbegi's emigration, his wife Ekaterine Chichua and their younger son Nika stayed in Soviet Georgia. Nika Kazbegi (1908–1983) made a career as a set designer and won the title of Honored Artist of Georgia in 1951.
