= List of Georgians =

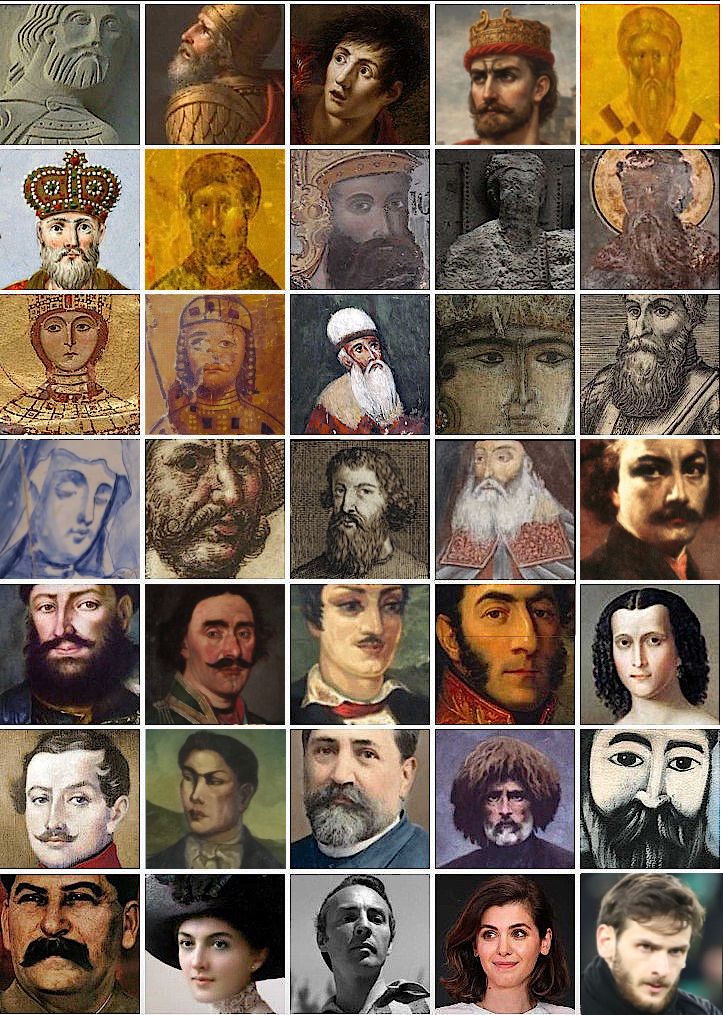
1st row: Pharnavaz I, Pharasmanes I, Rhadamistus, Pharasmanes the Valiant, Peter the Iberian 2nd row: Vakhtang I, Hilarion the Iberian, John Tornike, David III the Great, George of Athos 3rd row: Maria of Alania, David IV the Builder, Shota Rustaveli, Tamar the Great, Simon I of Kartli 4th row: Ketevan the Martyr, Giorgi Saakadze, Archil II, Anthim the Iberian, David Guramishvili 5th row: Erekle II, Solomon I, Besiki, Peter Bagration, Nino, Princess of Mingrelia 6th row: Alexander Chavchavadze, Nikoloz Baratashvili, Ilia Chavchavadze, Vazha Pshavela, Niko Pirosmani 7th row: Joseph Stalin, Mary Eristavi, George Balanchine, Katie Melua, Khvicha Kvaratskhelia.

This is a list of notable Georgians.

== Leaders and politicians ==
- Pharnavaz I, King of Iberia from 302 to 237 BC
- Vakhtang I Gorgasali, King of Iberia from 447/449–502/522
- David the Builder (1073–1125), King of Georgia from 1089 to 1125
- Tamar the Great (1160–1213), Queen of Georgia from 1184 to 1207/1213
- George V The Brilliant, King of Georgia from 1299 to 1302 and from 1314 to 1346
- Heraclius II, King of Kartli-Kakheti from 1762 to 1798
- Noe Zhordania (1868–1953), revolutionary and chairman of the Government of the Democratic Republic of Georgia
- Joseph Stalin (1878–1953), Soviet dictator from 1924 to 1953
- Zviad Gamsakhurdia (1939–1993), first President of the Republic of Georgia from 1991 to 1992
- Eduard Shevardnadze (1927–2014), Foreign Minister of the USSR and second President of the Republic of Georgia from 1995 to 2003
- Mikheil Saakashvili, third president of Georgia from 2004 to 2013
- Qasim Barid I, a founder of the Bidar Sultanate, one of the five Deccan sultanates in early modern India.
- Yusuf Adil Shah, a founder of the Bijapur Sultanate, one of the five Deccan sultanates in early modern India.
- Nata Menabde (born 1960), executive director of the World Health Organization

== Military figures ==
Throughout history, there were many notorious Georgian military figures and commanders serving in the Georgian, Turkish, Iranian, Spanish, Russian, Polish and other country's military forces from BC till today. There were around 100 high-ranking officers serving in the Polish army during World War II alone. Most prominent figures served in Russian, US and Persian armies.

(Incomplete list, see above categories for more)

- Grigol Bakurianis-dze (11th century), general in the Byzantine service
- Giorgi Saakadze (1570–1629), Georgian, Safavid and Ottoman military commander who won many battles against Muslim coalition forces and also battles for the Ottoman and Safavid Empire; notorious for annihilating an Iranian army at the Battle of Martqopi in 1625 almost without own losses
- Allahverdi Khan (c. 1560 – June 3, 1613), Iranian general and statesman of Georgian origin who rose to high office in the Safavid state
- Imam-Quli Khan, Iranian military and political leader of Georgian origin who served as a governor of Fars, Lar and Bahrain for the shahs Abbas I and Safi
- Daud Khan Undiladze, Iranian military commander and politician of Georgian origin; governor (beglarbeg) of Ganja and Karabakh 1625–1630
- Rostom-Khan Saakadze (c. 1588 – 1 March 1643), Iranian Safavid military commander (sipah-salar) of Georgian origin
- Prince Alexander of Imereti (1674–1711), Georgian prince and commander of the artillery of the Russian Empire under Peter I
- Yusef Khan-e Gorji, Iranian military leader of Georgian origin
- Pyotr Bagration (1765–1812), one of the most prominent generals in Russian military history and most respected opponent of Napoleon; the Soviet counterattack against German forces in World War II was named after him, Operation Bagration
- Alexandre Bagrationi (1770–1844), Georgian prince and resistance fighter
- Roman Bagration (1778–1834), prominent general of the Imperial Russian army, distinguished commander in the Russo-Persian Wars and Napoleonic Wars
- Ivane Bagration of Mukhrani (1812–1895), major general of the Russian Empire; revolutionizer of the wine industry
- Ivane Amilakhvari (1829–1905), general of the Russian Empire and distinguished commander during the Crimean War and Russo-Turkish War
- Alexander Imeretinsky (1837–1900), Georgian-Russian prince; lieutenant general and hero of the Russo-Turkish War; became governor-general of Warsaw in 1897
- Ivane Kazbegi (1860–1943), major general of the Russian Empire, then major general of the Polish Army and strategist at the Polish Academy of Defence
- Kote Abkhazi (1867–1923), general of the Russian Empire and Georgian resistance fighter
- Zakaria Bakradze (1870–1938), brigadier general of the Polish army
- Giorgi Mazniashvili (1872–1937), general in Russian and Georgian service; defeated three enemy armies invading Georgia
- Giorgi Kvinitadze (1874–1970), Russian general and later commander-in-chief of the Democratic Republic of Georgia during the Red Army invasion of Georgia
- Joseph Stalin (1878–1953), leader of the Soviet Union
- Leo Kereselidze (1878–1942)
- Alexandre Chkheidze (1878–1940), general of the Polish army
- Valiko Jugheli (1887–1924), Georgian general and resistance fighter
- Kaikhosro (Kakutsa) Cholokashvili (1888–1930), Georgian resistance fighter
- Konstantin Mikeladze (1895–1935), commander in the Iranian army
- Grigor Mikeladze (1898–1955), first lieutenant in the Iranian army
- Shalva Maglakelidze (1893–1976), Georgian general and later in charge of the German Georgian Legion of (1941–1945)
- Pore Mosulishvili (1916–1944), Soviet soldier and partisan in the Italian resistance movement
- Valerian Tevzadze (1894–1987), colonel of the Polish army and resistance fighter in World War II, later against the Soviet rule until his death in 1987
- Lavrentiy Beria (1899–1953), marshal of the Soviet Union and main ideologist and architect, as well as chief of the Soviet secret police, NKVD
- Konstantin Leselidze (1903–1944), colonel general of the Soviet Union, commander of the Caucasus front and hero of the Soviet Union
- Dimitri Amilakhvari (1906–1942), colonel of the French Foreign Legion, fighting on almost every important spot during the war, hero of France and iconic figure of the French resistance during World War II
- Vladimir Janjgava (1907–1982), lieutenant general and hero of the Soviet Union
- Alexi Inauri (1908–1993), colonel general and hero of the Soviet Union
- Vasilij Shalvovich Kvachantiradze (1907–1950), Soviet sniper who scored 215-500 kills, hero of the Soviet Union
- Yaroslav Iosseliani (1912–1978), submarine commander, hero of the Soviet Union
- Archil Gelovani (1915–1978), marshal of the engineer troops
- Jerzy Tumaniszwili (1916–2010), counter admiral of the Polish navy
- Noe Adamia (1914–1942), Soviet sniper, hero of the Soviet Union
- Meliton Kantaria (1920–1993), sergeant of the Red Army who raised the Soviet victory banner over the Reichstag in Berlin, April 30, 1945
- Geno Adamia (1936–1993), Georgian major general and garrison commander of Sokhumi; executed with the entire garrison and extermination of the city's population by Abkhazian militia during the Sukhumi massacre
- John Shalikashvili (Poland, 1936–2011), general of the United States, chairman of the Joint Chiefs of Staff and supreme commander of NATO forces in Europe; partially solved Kurdish conflict on the Iraqi-Turkish border, saving around 500.000 Kurdish people being displaced; developed the Joint Vision 10 plan, a template which combined all elements of the United States armed forces to one efficient network of the different combat components

== Religious leaders ==
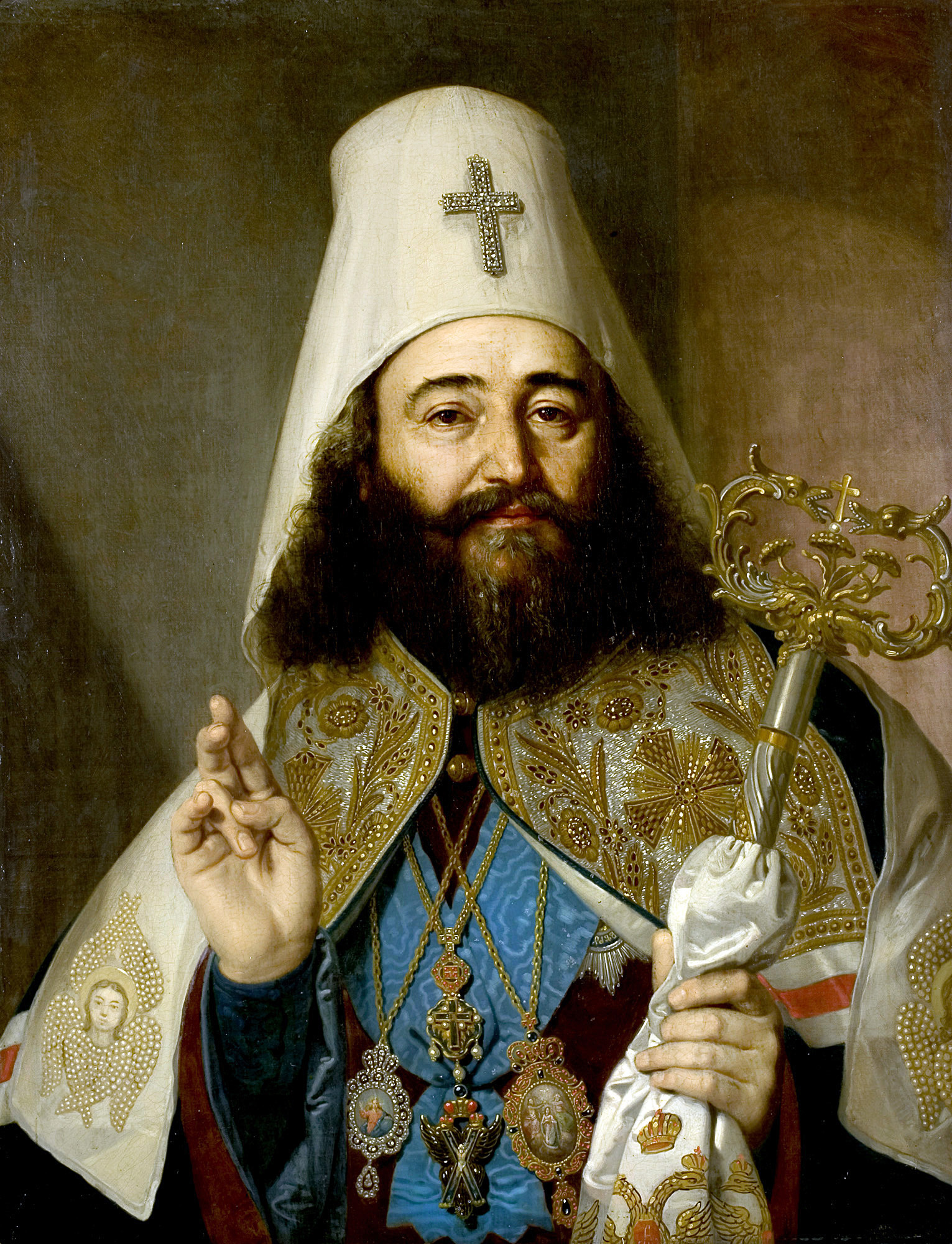
Patriarch Antonius II of Georgia

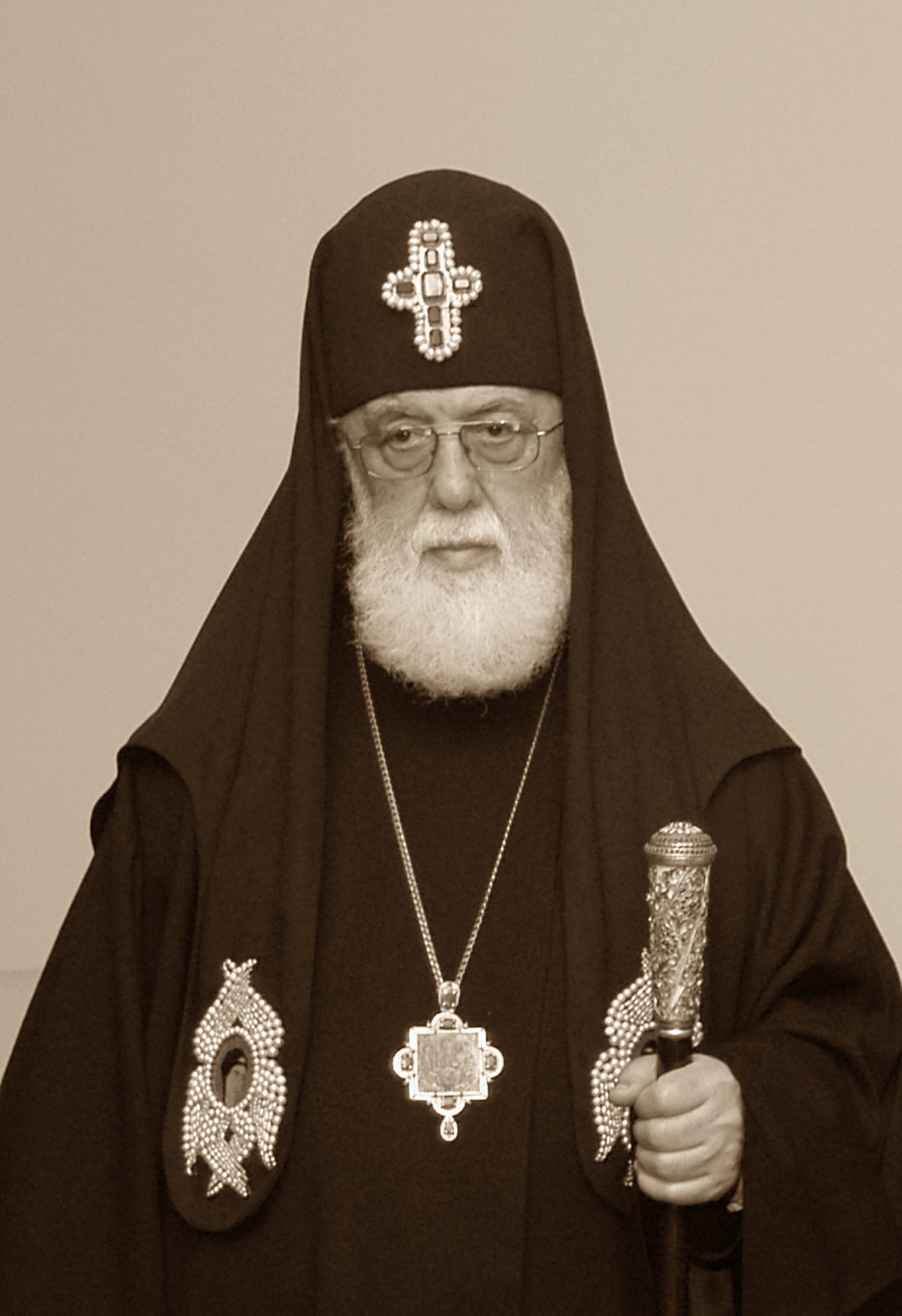
Ilia II.

- Saint Nino (c. 296 – c. 338 or 340), a woman from Cappadocia, heavily involved in the Christianization of Iberia
- Thirteen Assyrian Fathers, among them Abibos of Nekresi, Assyrian missionaries, said to have arrived from Mesopotamia in the 6th century.
- Gregory of Khandzta (759–861), a prominent ecclesiastic figure, active in Tao-Klarjeti
- George of Chqondidi (died c. 1118), a churchman and court minister, advisor to David IV of Georgia
- Arsen of Iqalto (died c. 1127), a prominent churchman and scholar
- Antim Iverianul (Antimoz Iverieli) (1650–1716), Metropolitan of Romania
- Nikoloz Cholokashvili (Niceforo Irbachi) (1585–1658), Orthodox priest
- Eudemus I of Georgia (died 1642), churchman serving as Catholicos-Patriarch of All Georgia from 1632 until his death in 1642.
- Anton II of Georgia (1762 or 1763–1827), member of the Bagrationi dynasty and Catholicos-Patriarch of All Georgia from (1788 to 1811)
- Dositheus of Tbilisi (died 1795), Archbishop of Tbilisi and a martyr
- Peter Kharischirashvili (1804/05–1890), Catholic monk
- Shio Batmanishvili (1885–1937), Catholic priest and martyr
- Michel Tamarati (1858–1911), Catholic priest
- Ambrosius (1861–1927), Catholicos-Patriarch of All Georgia from 1921 to 1927
- Grigol Peradze (1899–1942), Archimandrite, historian (Poland)
- Elie Melia (1915–1988), Orthodox priest and church historian
- Gabriel (1929–1995), Orthodox monk, venerated as Saint Gabriel, Confessor and Fool for Christ
- Ilia II (1933–2026), Catholicos-Patriarch of All Georgia since 1977

== Scholars ==
=== Medieval ===
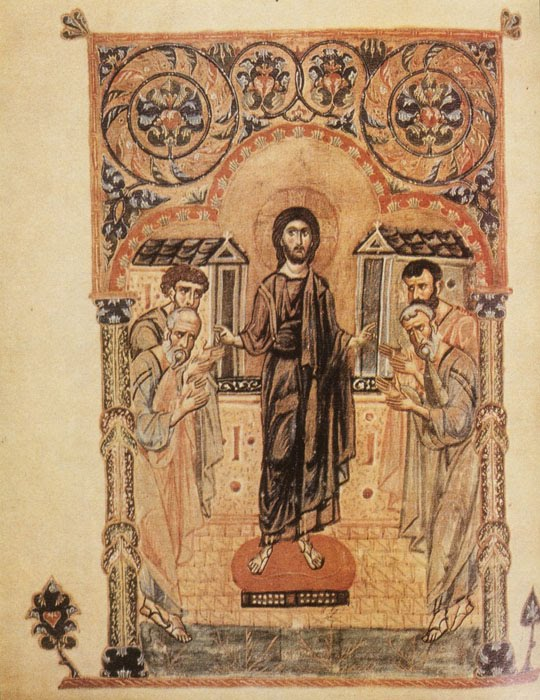
Fragment from Vani Gospels by certain John the Unworthy, 12-13th century.

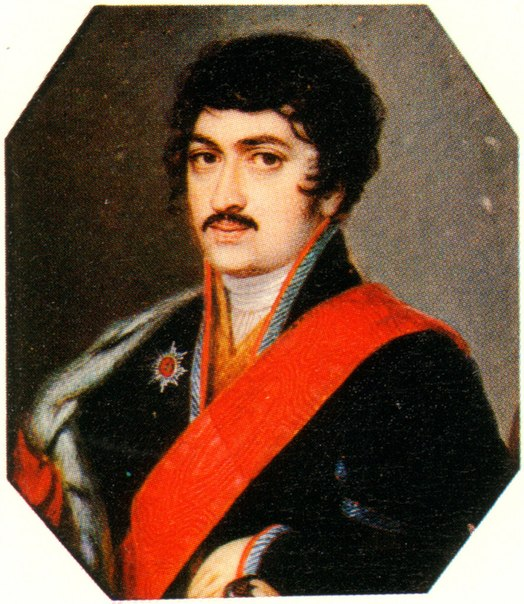
Teimuraz son of George XII, he tutored Georgian scholars such as Platon Ioseliani and David Chubinashvili

- Peter the Iberian (c. 417 – 491), theologian and philosopher, one of the founders of Christian Neoplatonism
- Martviri Sabatsmindeli 6th century, monk, calligrapher and writer at Mar Saba; foreman of Sabbas the Sanctified
- Basili Sabatsmindeli 8th century, monk, calligrapher and writer at Mar Saba
- Makari of Leteti 9th century, calligrapher and scholar at Mar Saba
- Mikaeli 9th century, calligrapher; known for Adysh Gospels
- Euthymius the Athonite (c. 955–1024), monk, philosopher and scholar
- Gabrieli 10th century, calligrapher
- Mikael Modrekili 10th century, calligrapher, poet, writer and scholar; best known for Iadgari of Mikael Modrekili
- Ioane Berai 10th century, calligrapher
- John Zosimus 10th century, monk, religious writer, and calligrapher; best known for his hymn "Praise and Exaltation of the Georgian Language."
- Gabriel Patarai 10th century, calligrapher
- George the Hagiorite (1009–1065), monk, calligrapher and scholar at the Iviron Monastery
- Ioane Mesvete 11th century, calligrapher
- Mikael Mtserali 11th century, calligrapher
- Arsen Ninotsmindeli 11th century, bishop, scholar, translator and calligrapher at the Iviron Monastery
- Leonti Mroveli 11th century, chronicler, contributor to The Georgian Chronicles
- Juansher Juansheriani 11th century, historian, contributor to The Georgian Chronicles
- Sumbat Davitis Dze 11th century, chronicler, contributor to The Georgian Chronicles
- Ephrem Mtsire 11-12th century, monk, theologian and translator
- Ioane Petritsi 11-12th century, Neoplatonist philosopher and translator
- Tbeli Abuserisdze (c. 1190 – 1240), scholar and religious writer
- Giorgi Dodisi 12th century, calligrapher at the Monastery of the Cross
- Nikrai 12-13th century, calligrapher
- Avgaroz Bandaisdze 14th century, calligrapher and painter
- Parsadan Gorgijanidze (1626 – c. 1696), historian and factotum
- Prince Vakhushti of Kartli (1696–1757), historian and geographer
- Mamuka Tavakalashvili 17th century, calligrapher, painter and poet
- David the Rector (1745–1824), pedagogue and calligrapher
- Teimuraz Bagrationi (1782–1846), historian and philologist

=== Modern ===
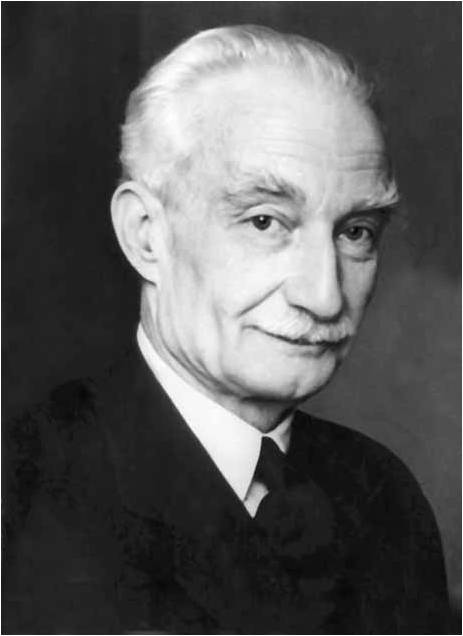
Ivane Javakishvili, a Georgian historian and a linguist whose voluminous works heavily influenced the modern scholarship of the history and culture of Georgia and Caucasus. He was also one of the founding fathers of the Tbilisi State University

- Platon Ioseliani (1810–1875), historian and civil servant
- David Chubinashvili (1814–1891), lexicographer, linguist, scholar of old Georgian literature.
- Mikhail Sabinin (1845–1900), monk and historian
- Nikolai Marr (1864–1934), historian and linguist; known for the pseudo-scientific Japhetic theory
- Kita Chkhenkeli (1865–1963), linguist and lexicographer
- Nikoloz Muskhelishvili (1891–1976), mathematician, physicist and engineer
- Michael Gregor (1888–1953), aircraft engineer
- Ilia Abuladze (1901–1968), philologist
- Georgy Beriev (1903–1979), Soviet major general, engineer, founder of the Beriev Aircraft Company
- Wachtang Djobadze (1917–2007), professor and art historian
- Malkhaz Abdushelishvili (1926–1998), anthropologist
- Hélène Carrère d'Encausse (1927–2023), political historian, Perpetual Secretary of the Académie Française
- David Devdariani (1927–2006), professor of Jurisprudence
- Georges Charachidzé (1930–2010), scholar of Caucasian Studies
- Gaston Bouatchidzé (1935–2022), professor, translator and writer
- Giuli Alasania (born 1946), historian
- Andria Apakidze (1914–2005), archaeologist
- Tornike Gordadze (born 1975), political scientist
- Manana Kochladze (born 1972), biologist and environmentalist
- François Zourabichvili (1965–2006), philosopher
- Zurab Avalishvili (1876–1944), historian
- Dimitri Bakradze (1826–1890), historian
- Ivan Beritashvili (1884–1974), physiologist
- Levan Chilashvili (1930–2004), archaeologist
- Rusudana Nikoladze (1884–1981), chemist and educator
- Alexander Nikuradse (1900–1981), physicist and Nazi political scientist
- Johann Nikuradse (1894–1979), engineer and physicist
- Michael Achmeteli (1895–1963), agronomist, sometime chief of the Wannsee Institut
- Juansher Chkareuli (born 1940), physicist
- Giorgi Chubinashvili (1885–1973), art historian
- Gia Dvali (born 1964), physicist
- Solomon Dodashvili (1805–1836), philosopher
- Revaz Dogonadze (1931–1985), physicist
- Revaz Gabashvili (1878–1959), historian
- Tamaz Gamkrelidze (1928–2021), linguist, President of the Academy of Sciences
- Vladimir Gigauri (1934–2006), scientist
- Olga Guramishvili-Nikoladze (1855–1940), educator
- Guranda Gvaladze (1932–2020), botanist
- Pavle Ingorokva (1893–1990), historian and philologist
- Nikoloz Janashia (1931–1982), historian
- Simon Janashia (1900–1947), historian
- Ivane Javakhishvili (1876–1940), historian
- Joseph Jordania (born 1954), ethnomusicologist and evolutionary musicologist (Australia)
- Sargis Kakabadze (1886–1967), historian
- Alexander Kartveli (1896–1974), aircraft engineer (United States)
- Giorgi Kartvelishvili (1827–1901), public figure, benefactor
- Simon Kaukhchishvili (1895–1981), historian and philologist
- Valentin Kontridze (1933–2002), ophthalmologist and eye microsurgeon
- David Lordkipanidze (born 1963), anthropologist
- Givi Maisuradze (born 1934), geologist
- Merab Mamardashvili (1930–1990), philosopher
- Guram Mchedlidze (1931–2009), biologist
- Giorgi Melikishvili (1918–2002), historian
- Roin Metreveli (born 1939), historian
- Alexander Nadiradze (1914–1987), missile engineer (USSR)
- Shalva Nutsubidze (1888–1969), philosopher
- Akaki Shanidze (1887–1987), linguist and philologist
- Ekvtime Takaishvili (1863–1953), historian and archaeologist
- Giorgi Tsereteli (1904–1973), linguist
- Grigol Tsereteli (1870–1938), philologist
- Mikheil Tsereteli (1878–1965), sumerologist
- Vasil Tsereteli (1862–1937), physician and public benefactor
- Dimitri Uznadze (1886–1950), psychologist and philosopher
- Ilia Vekua (1907–1977), mathematician

== Cultural figures ==
=== Actors ===
- Leila Abashidze
- Veriko Anjaparidze
- Medea Chakhava
- Sofiko Chiaureli
- Elisabed Cherkezishvili
- Ramaz Chkhikvadze
- Mariam Garikhuli (1883–1960)
- Kakhi Kavsadze
- Vakhtang Kikabidze
- Zurab Kipshidze
- Otar Koberidze
- Avtandil Makharadze
- Kote Makharadze
- Giorgi Nakashidze
- Merab Ninidze
- Guram Sagaradze
- Karlo Sakandelidze
- Nato Vachnadze
- Bukhuti Zakariadze
- Sergo Zakariadze
- Elena Satine
- Veriko Anjaparidze
- Sesilia Takaishvili
- Erosi Manjgaladze
- Lika Kavjaradze
- Otar Megvinetukhutsesi

=== Architects ===
- Simon Kldiashvili
- Victor Djorbenadze
- Vazha Orbeladze
- Shota Kavlashvili
- Giuli Gegelia
- George Chakhava
- Giorgi Khmaladze

=== Artists ===
- Pyotr Bletkin
- Iago Dekanozishvili
- Georgi Aleksi-Meskhishvili
- Irakli Gamrekeli
- Bacha Koperia
- Luca Lazar
- Valerian Sidamon-Eristavi
- Dimitri Tavadze
- Simon Virsaladze
- Mirian Shvelidze
- André Sevruguin

=== Ballet dancers ===
- Nino Ananiashvili
- George Balanchine (1904–1983), US choreographer; founder of school of American ballet
- Vakhtang Chabukiani
- Irma Nioradze
- Nikolai Tsiskaridze

=== Composers ===
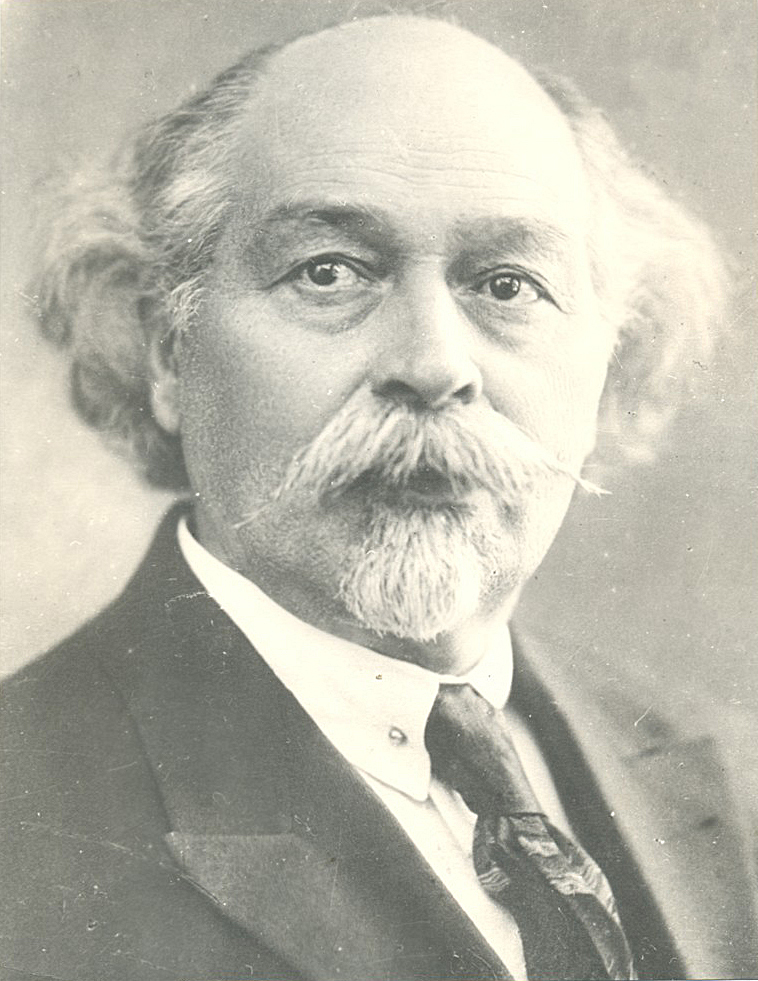
Dimitri Arakishvili

- Dimitri Arakishvili
- Andria Balanchivadze
- Meliton Balanchivadze
- Alexandre Basilaia
- Ioseb Bardanashvili
- Alexander Borodin
- Otar Gordeli
- Vakhtang Kakhidze
- Giya Kancheli (1935–2019)
- Bidzina Kvernadze
- Mikheil Kobakhidze
- Ioseb Kechakmadze
- Mindia Khitarishvili
- Aleksandre Machavariani
- Vakhtang Machavariani
- Nikoloz Memanishvili
- Konstantin Meladze
- Vano Muradeli
- Zurab Nadarejshvili
- Koka Nikoladze
- Zakaria Paliashvili
- Otar Taktakishvili
- Sulkhan Tsintsadze
- Victor Dolidze (composer)
- Natela Svanidze
- Givi Gachechiladze

=== Conductors ===
- Jemal Gokieli
- Vakhtang Jordania
- Jansug Kakhidze
- Vakhtang Kakhidze
- Evgeni Mikeladze

=== Designers ===
- Keto Mikeladze
- Irene Galitzine
- Irakli Nasidze
- Aka Nanitashvili
- Tatuna Nikolaishvili
- Lako Bukia
- David Koma
- Ria Keburia
- Ekaterine Abuladze
- Anouki (designer)
- Avtandil (designer)
- Teona Gardapkhadze
- Irina Shabayeva
- Demna Gvasalia

=== Folk musicians ===
- Ensemble Erisioni
- Ensemble Georgika
- Ensemble Rustavi
- Hamlet Gonashvili
- Sukhishvili National Ballet
- Trio Mandili

=== Filmmakers ===
- Vasil Amashukeli
- Mikhail Kalatozov
- Dodo Abashidze
- Tengiz Abuladze
- Temur Babluani
- Mikheil Chiaureli
- Goderdzi Chokheli
- Georgi Daneliya
- Sergi Gvarjaladze
- Levan Gabriadze (born 1969)
- Otar Ioseliani
- Marlen Khutsiev (Khutsishvili)
- Giorgi Shengelaia
- Eldar Shengelaia
- Dito Tsintsadze
- Aleksei Gerasimov, also known as DaFuq!?Boom! or Blugray

=== Opera singers ===
- Paata Burchuladze
- Lamara Chkonia
- Stella Grigorian
- Tamar Iveri
- Makvala Kasrashvili
- Nino Machaidze
- Badri Maisuradze
- Natela Nicoli
- Anita Rachvelishvili
- Zurab Sotkilava
- Nino Surguladze
- Tsisana Tatishvili

=== Painters ===
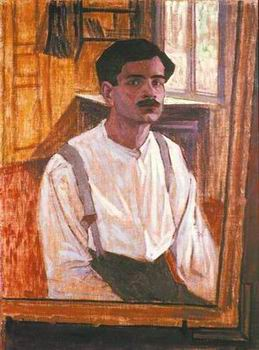
David Kakabadze is widely considered to be the most important Georgian Avant-Garde painter. 'Self-portrait in the mirror.' 1913

- Merab Abramishvili
- Elene Akhvlediani
- David Alexidze
- Pyotr Nikolayevich Gruzinsky
- Gia Bugadze
- Gigo Gabashvili
- Lado Gudiashvili
- Elene Akhvlediani
- Hasan Helimishi
- Gia Gugushvili
- Dimitri Shevardnadze
- Aliquli Jabbadar
- Mamuka Japharidze
- David Kakabadze
- Shalva Kikodze
- Sergo Kobuladze
- Apollon Kutateladze
- Guram Kutateladze
- Levan Mindiashvili
- Petre Otskheli
- Irakli Parjiani
- Rusudan Petviashvili
- Niko Pirosmani
- Oleg Timchenko
- Radish Tordia
- Georgy Konstantinovich Totibadze
- Avto Varazi
- Ekaterine Abuladze
- Levan Songulashvili
- Michael Vadbolsky

=== Pianists ===
- Tengiz Amirejibi
- Eteri Andjaparidze
- Khatia Buniatishvili
- Marina Goglidze-Mdivani
- Inga Kashakashvili
- Alexander Korsantia
- Giorgi Latso
- Tamriko Siprashvili
- Irma Svanadze
- Alexander Toradze
- Anastasia Virsaladze
- Eliso Virsaladze
- Eleonora Eksanishvili

=== Poets ===
- Alexander Abasheli
- Irakli Abashidze
- Rati Amaglobeli
- Lado Asatiani
- Nikoloz Baratashvili
- Besiki
- Alexander Chavchavadze
- Ilia Chavchavadze
- Zviad Gamsakhurdia
- Valerian Gaprindashvili
- David-Dephy Gogibedashvili
- Terenti Graneli
- Ioseb Grishashvili
- David Guramishvili
- Yetim Gurdji
- Paolo Iashvili
- Irakli Kakabadze
- Ana Kalandadze
- Giorgi Leonidze
- Mukhran Machavariani
- David Magradze
- Kolau Nadiradze
- Niko Nikoladze
- Vazha-Pshavela
- Shota Rustaveli
- Galaktion Tabidze
- Titsian Tabidze
- Akaki Tsereteli

=== Photographers ===
- Alexander Roinashvili (1846–1898)
- Antoin Sevruguin (1830–1933)
- Guram Tikanadze (1832–1863)
- Irakly Shanidze (born 1968)
- David Meskhi (born 1979)

=== Sculptors ===
- Iakob Nikoladze
- Irakli Ochiauri
- Zurab Tsereteli
- Elguja Amashukeli (1926–2002)
- Merab Berdzenishvili (1929–2016)
- Goudji (born 1941) also a goldsmith

=== Singers ===
- Nutsa Buzaladze
- Irakli Charkviani
- Niaz Diasamidze
- Mariko Ebralidze
- Tamara Gachechiladze
- Nino Katamadze
- Tornike Kipiani
- Iru Khechanovi
- Nika Kocharov
- Katie Melua
- Oto Nemsadze
- Mariam Shengelia
- Irma Sokhadze
- Nina Sublatti
- Tamta

=== Theatre producers ===
- Kote Marjanishvili
- Sandro Akhmeteli
- Valerian Gunia
- Revaz Gabriadze (1935–2021)
- Robert Sturua
- Andro Enukidze
- Vakhtang Mchedelov
- Mikheil Tumanishvili
- Manana Anasashvili
- Synetic Theater (Founded and run by Paata and Irina Tsikurishvili)

=== Writers ===
- Kita Abashidze, literary critic
- Chabua Amirejibi
- Lado Asatiani (1917–1942), poet
- Ilia Chavchavadze (1837–1907), poet and writer
- Otar Chiladze
- Tamaz Chiladze
- Daniel Chonkadze
- Nino Dadeshkeliani (1890–1931), writer, politician
- Shalva Dadiani
- Guram Dochanashvili
- Nodar Dumbadze
- Konstantine Gamsakhurdia
- Iakob Gogebashvili
- Levan Gotua
- Mikheil Javakhishvili
- Aleksandre Kazbegi
- Babilina Khositashvili (1884–1973), poet, feminist
- Leo Kiacheli
- David Kldiashvili
- Mukhran Machavariani (1929–2010), poet
- Ekaterine Melikishvili (1854–1928), translator, feminist
- Kato Mikeladze (1878–1942), journalist and feminist
- Aka Morchiladze
- George Papashvily
- Vazha-Pshavela (Luka Razikashvili) (1862–1915), poet and writer
- Guram Rcheulishvili
- Grigol Robakidze
- Shota Rustaveli (12th century), poet
- Galaktion Tabidze (1891–1953), poet
- David Turashvili
- Lasha Bughadze

== Sportspeople ==
- Shota Arveladze (born 1973), former footballer and football manager
- Giorgi Asanidze (born 1975), Olympic and world champion weightlifter and politician
- Zurab Azmaiparashvili (born 1960), chess grandmaster
- Nikoloz Basilashvili (born 1992), tennis player, winner of 5 ATP titles and former nº 16 in the ATP rankings
- Maia Chiburdanidze (born 1961), Women's World Champion in chess (1978–1991)
- Merab Dvalishvili (born 1991), mixed martial artist and current UFC Bantamweight Champion
- Natela Dzalamidze (born 1993), tennis player
- Roman Dzindzichashvili (born 1944), US Chess Champion (1983 and 1989)
- Kokkai Futoshi (Levan Tsaguria) (born 1981), sumo wrestler
- Nona Gaprindashvili (born 1941), Women's World Champion in chess (1962–1978)
- Kakhi Kakhiashvili (born 1969), Olympic and world champion weightlifter
- Kakhaber Kaladze (born 1978), footballer, Genoa and Georgia national team
- Khvicha Kvaratskhelia (born 2001), footballer, Paris Saint-Germain and Georgia national team
- Temuri Ketsbaia (born 1968), former footballer, notably for Newcastle United F.C. and Georgia national team
- Mikhail Khergiani (1932–1969), champion mountaineer
- Georgi Kinkladze (born 1973), former footballer
- Gagamaru Masaru (Teimuraz Jugheli) (born 1987), sumo wrestler
- Mevlud Meladze (born 1972), Formula Alfa champion
- Oganez Mkhitaryan (born 1962), football coach and former player
- Natalia Nasaridze (born 1972), champion archer
- Zaza Pachulia (born 1984), NBA basketball player
- Roman Rurua (born 1942), wrestler
- Tornike Shengelia (born 1991), basketball player
- Lasha Talakhadze (born 1993), Olympic and world champion weightlifter
- Gocha Tsitsiashvili (born 1973), Israeli Olympic wrestler
- Nikoloz Tskitishvili (born 1983), NBA basketball player
- Tochinoshin Tsuyoshi (Levan Gorgadze) (born 1987), sumo wrestler
- Dimitri Yachvili (born 1980), French former rugby union footballer
- Valerian Zirakadze (born 1978), former footballer
- Levan Saginashvili (born 1988), arm-wrestler
- Giga Chikadze (born 1988), mixed martial artist and former kickboxer
- Ilia Topuria (born 1997), mixed martial artist and UFC Featherweight Champion

== Businesspeople ==
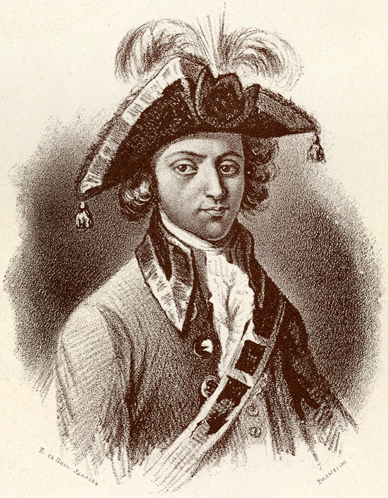
Sila Zandukeli-Sandunov

- Sila Zandukeli-Sandunov (1756–1820), founder of the eponymous Sandunóvskie Baths
- David Sarajishvili (1848–1911), entrepreneur, philanthropist and scientist. Founder of Kizlyar Brandy Factory
- George Coby (1883–1967)
- Alex d'Arbeloff (1927–2008), co-founder of Teradyne
- Kakha Bendukidze (1956–2014), statesman, businessman and philanthropist
- Levan Gachechiladze (born 1964), founder of Georgian Wine Company, 2008 Georgian presidential candidate
- Tamir Sapir (1946/1947–2014)
- David Gamkrelidze (born 1964), founder of Aldagi Insurance Company; former Member of Parliament
- Bidzina (Boris) Ivanishvili (born 1956), politician, billionaire, businessman and philanthropist; Prime Minister of Georgia from October 2012 to November 2013.
- Badri Patarkatsishvili (1956–2008), business oligarch; richest Georgian businessman; 2008 Georgian presidential candidate
- Mamuka Khazaradze (born 1966), businessman and politician, founder of TBC Bank
- David Nikuradze (born 1975), journalist
- George Arison, (born 1977) founder and CEO of Shift

== Other known Georgians ==
- Levan Abelishvili (1909–1974), electrical engineer who pioneered railway electrification
- Razhden Arsenidze (1880–1965), jurist, journalist, and politician
- Sopho Khalvashi (born 1986), singer
- Nino Kipiani (1877–1920s), lawyer
- Zviad Kvachantiradze (born 1965), former Secretary General of TRACECA, ambassador
- Gocha Lordkipanidze (born 1964), Georgian judge of the International Criminal Court
- The Mdivani family, aznauri, or minor nobility
- Vasily Sopromadze (born 1963), property developer in Russia
- Boygar Razikashvili
- Irina Yanovskaya, journalist and human rights activist

== See also ==
- Lists of people by nationality
- List of Georgian Americans
