= Doctor Love =

Doctor Love or Dr. Love may refer to:

== Music ==
- Doctor Love (album), by Alex Gaudino, 2013
- "Doctor Love", a song by Bananarama from Deep Sea Skiving, 1983
- "Doctor Love", a song by First Choice, 1977
- "Doctor Love", a song by the Pearls, 1975
- "Doctor Love", a song by Split Enz from See Ya 'Round, 1984
- "Dr Love", a 1976 song by Tina Charles
- "Dr. Love" (song), by Stella Getz, 1994
- "Dr. Love", a song by the Bumblebeez, 2007
- "Calling Dr. Love", a song by Kiss, 1977

== People ==
- Dr. Love (artist) (born 1985), Georgian street/graffiti artist
- Jun Banaag (born 1951), Filipino former radio personality
- Leo Buscaglia (1924–1998), American academic, author, and motivational speaker
- Paul Matavire (1961–2005), Zimbabwean musician in the Jairos Jiri Band

== Other uses ==
- Doctor Love (film), a 2011 Indian Malayalam film
- Doctor Love, a novel by Gael Greene
- "Doctor Love", a poem by Patti Smith from the 1978 book Babel
