= List of people from Georgia =

List of people from Georgia may refer to:

- List of Georgians (from the country of Georgia)
- List of people from Georgia (U.S. state)
