= Grobnik, Primorje-Gorski Kotar County =

Coordinates: 45°22′11″N 14°27′37″E

Grobnik
- Interactive map of Grobnik

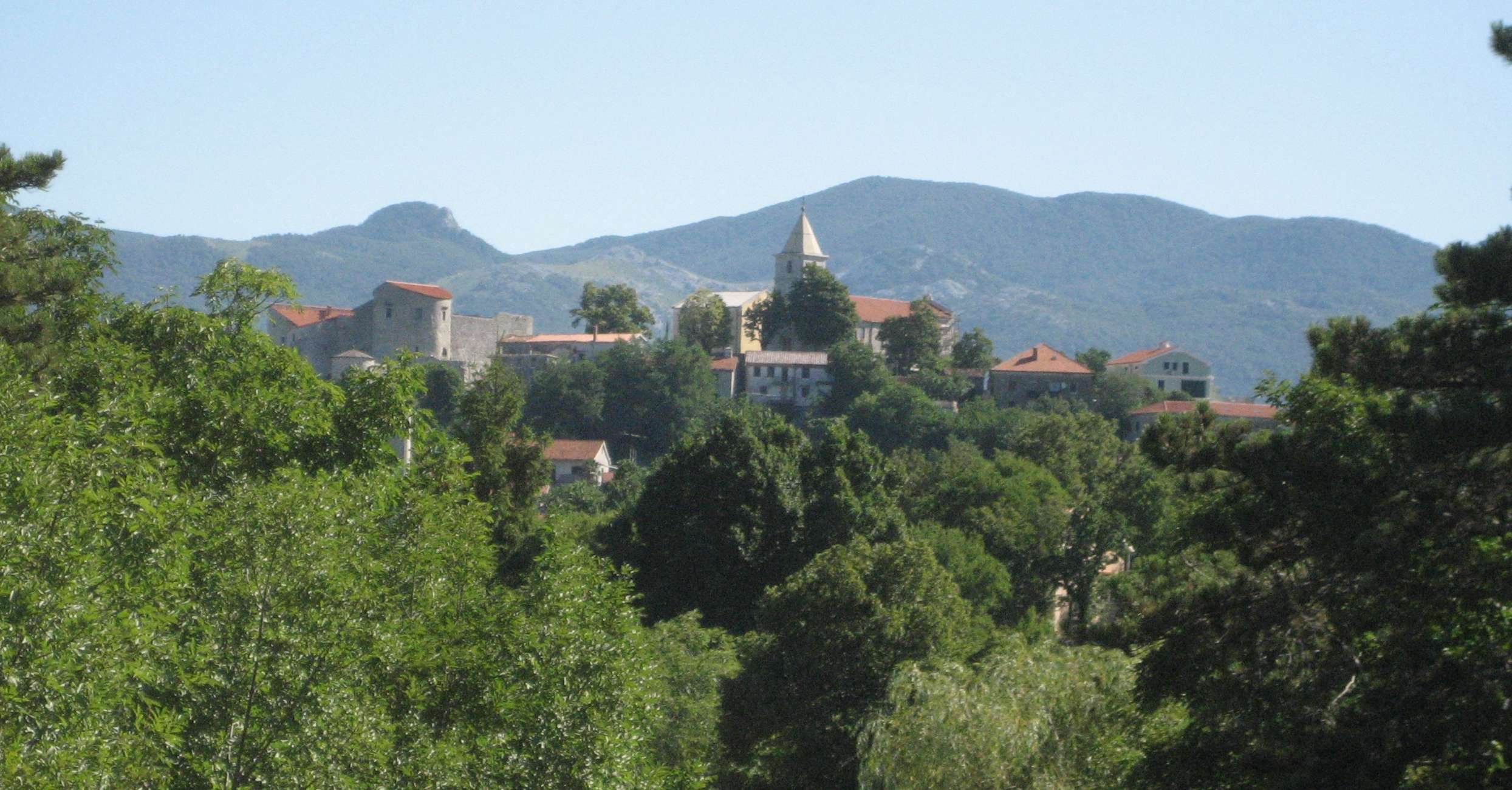
Grobnik Castle

Grobnik is a village near Čavle, Croatia. In the 2011 census, it had 421 inhabitants.

== History ==
Grobnik was mentioned on 22 February 1481 in a document freeing the citizens of Grič from tariffs in Grobnik and elsewhere.

== Demographics ==
In 1895, the obćina of Grobnik (court at Grobnik), with an area of 12.8 square kilometres (4.9 mi^{2}), belonged to the kotar of Sušak (Bakar court and electoral district) in the županija of Modruš-Rieka (Ogulin court and financial board). There were 445 houses, with a population of 2167. Its 11 villages and 6 hamlets were divided for taxation purposes into 3 porezne obćine, under the Bakar office.
