= Shanidze =

Shanidze is a surname. Notable people with the surname include:

- Akaki Shanidze (1887–1987), Georgian linguist and philologist
- Dito Shanidze (1937–2010), Soviet weightlifter
- Irakly Shanidze (born 1968), Georgian-American creative director and photographer
- Tamara Shanidze (born 1969), Georgian sprinter
