= Kotar =

Kotar may refer to:

- Kotar (musical instrument), a stringed instrument that is a cross between a guitar and a koto
- Kothar-wa-Khasis, a Canaanite deity
- Kotar (subdivision), a type of territorial subdivision used in the former Austria-Hungary and Yugoslavia and then in Croatia
- Kotar, Satna, a town in Madhya Pradesh, India
- Kotar, Iran, a village in Kermanshah Province, Iran
- Doug Kotar, an American football running back
- Kotar (orca), a deceased male orca
