= Irma Svanadze =

Irma Svanadze, Portugal 2008

Irma Svanazde is a classical pianist originally from Georgia. She studied piano performance in Eastern Europe, France, Belgium and the United States, and has performed internationally in Europe and the United States.

== Early life and education ==
Born in Kutaisi, Georgia, Irma Svanadze began studying piano at age of six. When she was 13, Irma was accepted into the Kutaisi College of Music, played her first solo recital and became a laureate of Georgia's Young Pianists Competitions.

Initially trained in the Russian Piano Tradition, Irma continued her education in France at the Saint-Maur Conservatory, where in 2000 she was awarded two Gold Medals – in piano and chamber music. This same year she also began teaching piano in the same conservatory, one of the youngest instructor to ever be so chosen.

In the fall of 2000, Ms. Svanadze was awarded First Prize of the Saint-Maur National Conservatory and the Highest Certificate with Merit in Instrumental Interpretation. In 2001 she continued her studies at the Brussels Royal Conservatory with legendary Russian pianist Evgeny Mogilevsky.

== Professional career ==
In September 2002, Irma Svanadze joined the Toradze Piano Studio at the Indiana University South Bend under the direction of Alexander Toradze. She toured internationally with the ensemble and participated in a Scriabin marathon performance that was reviewed in The New York Times in 2002.

During her post graduate studies, Irma continued to compete in elite competitions including Frinna Awerbuch and the World Piano Competition. At IUSB she earned a Master in Piano Performance and Artist's Diploma.

A frequent guest of US and European festivals, Irma delivers performances to audiences large and small. She has appeared in festivals including Ravenna (Italy), the Bologna Festival (Italy), the Ruhr Piano Festival (Germany), the Rock Hotel Piano Fest (USA). Irma has also performed in celebrated halls such as the Steinway Hall (New-York), the Great Hall of the Mozarteum (Salzburg), Gulbenkian Hall (Lisbon) and Auditorium di Roma.

Irma is currently working on Doctorate in Musical Arts (Piano Performance) at the Michigan State University.
