= Guram Mchedlidze =

Georgian scientist (1931–2009)

Guram I. Mchedlidze (Georgian: გურამ ი. მჭედლიძე; September 27, 1931, Tbilisi – 2009, Tbilisi) was a Georgian Palaeobiologist, Corresponding Member of the Georgian National Academy of Sciences (GNAS), Doctor of Biological Sciences (Dr. Habil.), Professor.

== Education and career ==
In 1954 he graduated from the Faculty of Biology of the Tbilisi State University (TSU). Since 1973 he was Professor of this Faculty.

In 1962 Mchedlidze received a PhD degree in biology, in 1973 a degree of the Doctor of Biological Sciences. In 1983 he was elected as Corresponding Member of the Georgian National Academy of Sciences (GNAS).

From 1979 to 1989 he was a deputy director of the L. Davitashvili Institute of Palaeobiology, serving as Director from 1989 to 2009.

In 1971, he was elected as a Fellow of the American Society of Paleontology.

Main fields of his scientific activity were a fossil dolphin, Tertiary cetaceans, phylogenesis of cetaceans, ancient mammals. He was author of more than 100 scientific-research works (among them 5 monographs).

Mchedlidze was organizer and participant of many important scientific events in Georgia and abroad.

== Some of main scientific works of Guram Mchedlidze ==
- "Fossil Cetacea of the Caucasus" (a monograph), Publishing House "Metsniereba", Tbilisi, 1964, 145 pp. (in Russian, Georgian and English summaries)
- "Some general features of the historic development of cetaceans" (a monograph), Publishing House "Metsniereba", 1970, 112 pp. (in Russian, Georgian and English summaries)
- "General features of the brain evolution of some groups of ancient mammals" (a monograph), Publishing House "Metsniereba", Tbilisi, 1986, 130 pp. (in Russian. Co-author: L.K. Gabunia)

== See also ==
- List of Georgians
