= Elizabeth Sandunova =

Russian opera singer

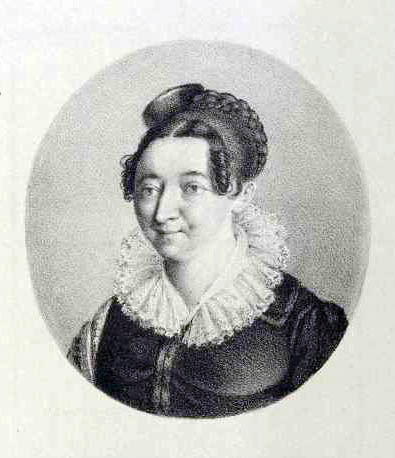
Elizabeth Sandunova

Elizabeth Semyonovna Sandunova, also known as Uranova, and Liza Uranova (Russian: Елизавета Семёновна Сандунова; 1772/76 – 3 December 1826), was a Russian stage actress and operatic mezzo-soprano and the wife of Sila Sandunov.

== Life ==
She was born Elizaveta Semyonovna Fyodorova. She was an opera student of Giovanni Paisiello and Vicente Martín-i-Soler, and an actor student of Ivan Dmitrevsky at the theatre school of Saint Petersburg. She debuted in 1790. She was considered not only to have a wonderful operatic voice, but also to be a talented dramatic actress. She was ordered to take the stage name "Uranova" by Catherine, in honor of the newly discovered planet Uranus.

In 1791, she was married at the royal chapel in the presence of the empress Catherine the Great.

In 1794–1812, she was active in Moscow, where she made a huge success in a patriotic opera during the war of 1812. She returned to Saint Petersburg in 1813.
