= Guranda Gvaladze =

Georgian botanist (1932–2020)

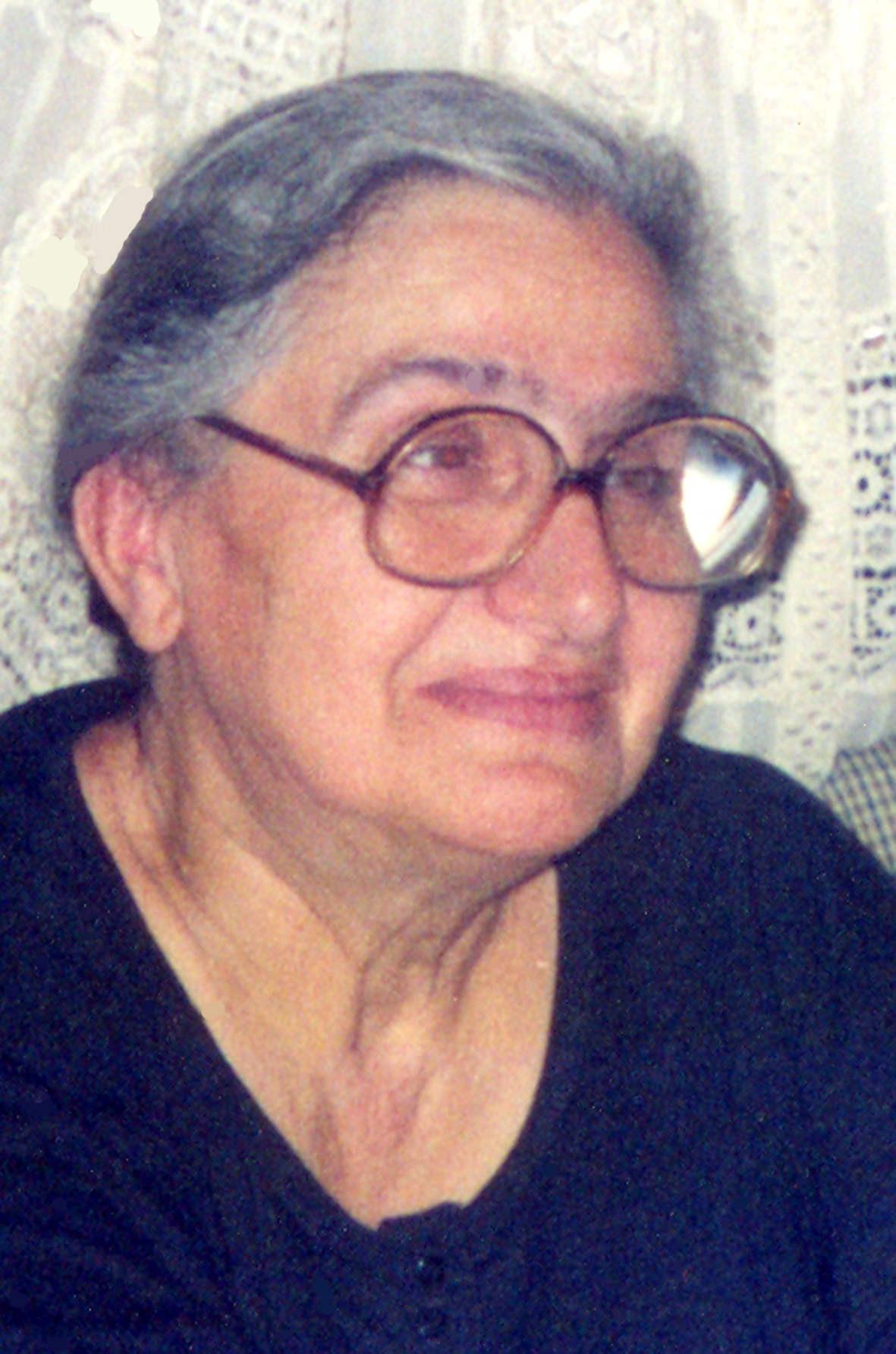
Guranda Gvaladze (2005)

Guranda Gvaladze (In Georgian გურანდა ღვალაძე, June 23, 1932 – January 24, 2020) was a notable Georgian botanist, one of the founders of Plant Embryology in Georgia, Academician of the Abkhazian Regional Academy of Sciences (1997), Doctor of Biological Sciences (1974), Professor (1991). Her father Evgen Gvaladze (1900-1937) was a notable Lawyer and Publicist, one of the leaders of the National-Liberation Movement of Georgia of 1921–1937.

She graduated the Biological Faculty of the Tbilisi State University (1956). In 1956-1959 she was a Post-Graduate Student of the Institute of Botany of the Georgian Academy of Sciences. In 1959-1983 she was a Research Fellow (1959-1966) and Senior Research Fellow (1966-1983) of the Institute of Botany. In 1983-1990 she was Head of the Department of Cultural Plants, 1990-2003 Head of the Department of Plant Reproduction at the Ketskhoveli Institute of Botany. In 2003-2010 she was Chief Research Fellow of this Department. Since 2010 to 2020 Gvaladze was the Emeritus Scientist of the institute of Botany. In 1962 she received the PhD degree in Biology, in 1974 the degree of Doctor of Biological Sciences (Full Doctor). In 1991 she received the scientific title of Professor.

Gvaladze is author of more than 180 scientific-research publications (among them 2 monographs and 1 manual) in the fields of Embryology of Flowering Plants, Double Fertilization, Apomixis, Ultrastructural research of Embryo Sac, etc. She is author of the Hypothesis about the stimulatory role of the Chalazal Polar Nucleus of the Central Cell of Angiosperm as compared to the Embryo in the preferential development of the Endosperm (1973-1974). Gvaladze is author of the 1st Manual "Reproduction of Plants" in Georgian (2008).

In the 1970s-1990s Gvaladze was active participant of the International Symposiums on Plant Embryology in France, India, Slovakia, Poland, Russia, etc. In 1984 she was a main organizer of such conference in Telavi (Georgia), in 1990 one of the organizers of the IX International Symposium on Plant Embryology (St.Petersburg, Russia).

Gvaladze was a member of the Board of the Georgian Botanical Society (since 1981), member of the International Association of Sexual Plant Reproduction Research (IASPRR, The Netherlands-Canada, since 1990. Gvaladze was one of the founding members of IASPRR), member of the International Organization for Plant Information (IOPI, USA, since 1999), member of EuroScience - the European Association for Promotion of Science and Technology (France, since 1998), Academician of the Abkhazian Regional Academy of Sciences (Tbilisi, since 1997), member of the editorial board of the "Bulletin of the Georgian Botanical Society". In 1983-2010 Gvaladze was a member of the Scientific Council of the Ketskhoveli Institute of Botany. In 1998 she was one of the founders of the Georgian National Section of EuroScience. In 1990 she received the International S.Navashin Medal "for outstanding contribution in Plant Embryology".

== Some main scientific works of Guranda Gvaladze ==
- G.E. Gvaladze. The Chalazal Polar Nucleus of the Central Cell of Angiosperm Embryo Sac. Publishing House "Metsniereba", Tbilisi, 1976, 120 pp. (A monograph. In Russian, Eng. summary).
- G.E. Gvaladze. Forms of Apomixis in the Genus Allium L.. In: Apomixis and Breeding. Edited by S.S.Khokhlov, Amerind Pub., 1976, pp. 160–165.
- G.E. Gvaladze. Asynchronous Division in Embryo and Endosperm in Liliaceae, Proc.Indian Natn.Sci.Acad., B 45, No 6, 1979, pp. 596–604
- G.E. Gvaladze. Gamets, Fertilization and Sexual Reproduction of Plants. Publishing House "Znanie", Moscow, 1981, 75 pp. (In Russian).
- G.E. Gvaladze. Ultrastructural Study of Embryo Sac of Galanthus Nivalis L.. In: Fertilization and Embryogenesis in Ovulated Plants, VEDA, Bratislava, 1983, pp. 203–205.
- M. Chiamporova, M.Sh. Akhalkatsi, G.E. Gvaladze. Ultrastructure of the Ovule Sterile Tissues in Galanthus Nivalis (Amaryllidaceae), Botanicheski Jurnal, V. 73, No 12, 1988, Moscow, pp. 1722–1730 (In Russian).
- G.E. Gvaladze & M.Sh. Akhalkatsi. Ultrastructure of Autumn and Spring Embryo Sac of Galanthus Nivalis L., Annales Scientifiques de l'Universite de Reims Champagne-Ardenne. A.R.E.R.S., No 23, 1988, pp. 152–155.
- G.E. Gvaladze & M.Sh. Akhalkatsi. Is the Polygonum-Type Embryo Sac Primitive?, Phytomorphology, 40 (3&4), 1990, pp. 331–337.
- G.E. Gvaladze & M.Sh. Akhalkatsi. Double Fertilization in Peperomia Pellucida, Phytomorphology, 48 (4), 1998, pp. 405–409.
- Embryology of Flowering Plants. Vol. 1: Generative Organs of Flower. Edited by T.B. Batygina, Science Publishers (USA), 2002 (Co-author).
- N. Nadirashvili, G. Gvaladze, M. Akhalkatsi. Structure and Function of the Hypertrophic Synergid in some Species of Genus Allium L., Proc.Georgian Acad.Sci., Biol.Ser. B. Vol. 4, No 2, Tbilisi, 2006, pp. 53–60.
- M. Akhalkatsi, G. Gvaladze, M. Gachechiladze, N. Taralashvili. Embryology of Gentiana Angulosa and G. Pontica (Gentianaceae), Proc.Georgian Acad.Sci., BiolSer., B. Vol. 2, No 1–2, Tbilisi, 2004, pp. 29–34.
- G.E. Gvaladze. Reproduction of Plants, Publishing House "Ligamus", Tbilisi, 2008, 128 pp. (In Georgian, Eng. summary).

== See also ==
- List of Georgians
- List of botanists
