= Prepared music =

Prepared music refers to experimental music played with a prepared instrument, a musical instrument with foreign objects inserted to alter its sound.

Types of prepared instruments include:

- Prepared piano
- Prepared guitar
- Prepared harp
