= Koka Nikoladze =

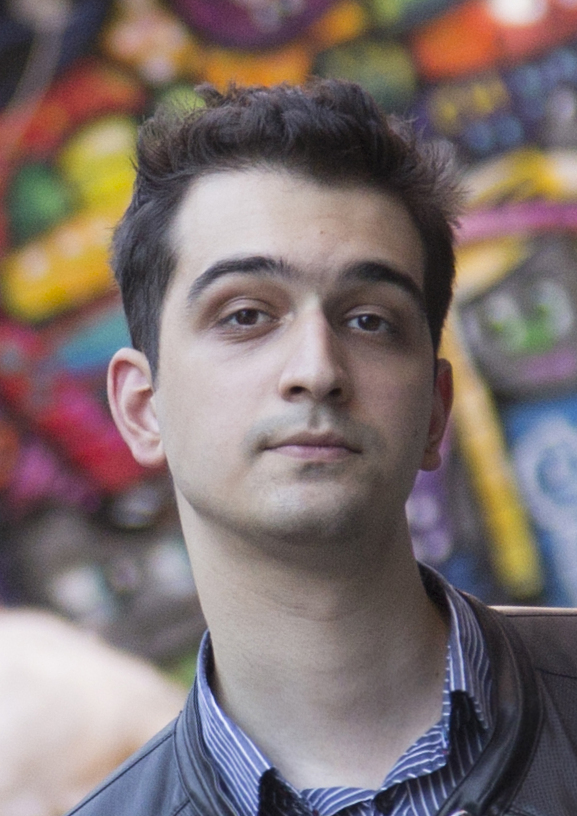
- Koka Nikoladze, in 2014

Background information
- Born: Akaki Nikoladze; 30 September 1989 (age 36); Tbilisi, Georgia
- Genres: Contemporary music
- Occupations: Composer, violinist, sound artist, computer musician
- Years active: 2010–present
- Website: koka.one

Koka Nikoladze (born 30 September 1989, in Tbilisi) is a Georgian composer and sound artist based in Oslo. He studied at the Tbilisi State Conservatoire, Musikhochschule Stuttgart and Norwegian Academy of Music. He studied composition with Zurab Nadarejshvili, Marco Stroppa and violin with Ernst Arakelov.

== Works ==
Nikoladze's compositions include:

- 2010 "Starshine" for guitar, violin and percussion, uses a prepared guitar
- 2011 "Poezdeplacement - Differentzeitmaßcope" for cembalo universale, violin and cello (Stuttgart micro tonality congress).
- 2011 "Luminarium" for piano, viola and clarinet for Le Balcon
- 2012 "Kepler Star Dj" for Piano, Timpani and electronics.
- 2012 he wrote his first opera "Vor dem Gesetz" [Kafka], which was premiered at Wilhelmspalais Stuttgart as a part of the opening ceremony of contemporary music theater studio.
- 2022 "SINGULARITY", a video piece for composed for the Oslo Philharmonic where footage of individual musicians are edited and rearranged into a 15-minute symphonic work.
