= Johann Nikuradse =

Johann Nikuradse (Georgian: ივანე ნიკურაძე, Ivane Nikuradze) (November 20, 1894 – July 18, 1979) was a Georgia-born German engineer and physicist. His brother, Alexander Nikuradse, was also a Germany-based physicist and geopolitician known for his ties with Alfred Rosenberg and for his role in saving many Georgians during World War II.

He was born in Samtredia, Georgia (then part of the Kutais Governorate, Imperial Russia) and studied at Kutaisi. In 1919, through the recommendations of the conspicuous Georgian scholar Petre Melikishvili, he went abroad for further studies. The 1921 Sovietization of Georgia precluded his return to homeland and Nikuradse naturalized as a German citizen.

As PhD student of Ludwig Prandtl in 1920, he later worked as a researcher at the Kaiser Wilhelm Institute for Flow Research (now the Max Planck Institute for Dynamics and Self-Organization). He succeeded in putting himself in Prandtl's favour and thus advanced to the position of department head. In spite of his close ties with the Nazi Party, Nikuradse came, in the early 1930s, under fire of the institute's National Socialist Factory Cell Organization whose members accused him of spying for the Soviet Union and of stealing books from the institute. Prandtl initially defended Nikuradse, but was eventually forced to dismiss him in 1934. He then served as a professor at the University of Breslau (1934–1945), and an honorary professor at the Aachen Technical University since 1945.

Nikuradse lived mostly in Göttingen and engaged in hydrodynamics. His best known experiment was published in Germany in 1933. Nikuradse carefully measured the friction that a fluid experiences in turbulent flow through a rough pipe. He cemented grains of sand to the inner wall of a pipe and discovered that, the rougher the surface the greater the friction, and hence a greater pressure loss.

He discovered that:

In range I, for small Reynolds number the resistance factor is the same for rough as for smooth pipes. The projections of the roughening lie entirely within the laminar layer for this range.

In range II (transition range), an increase in the resistance factor was observed for an increasing Reynolds number. The thickness of the laminar layer is here of the same order of magnitude as that of the projections.

In range III, the resistance factor is independent of the Reynolds number (quadratic law of resistance). Here all the projections of the roughening extend through the laminar layer and the resistance factor $\lambda$ .

$\lambda = \frac{1}{(1.14+2 log(\frac{r}{k}))^2}$
