= Sanduny =

Architectural landmark in Moscow

Coordinates: 55°45′51″N 37°37′17″E

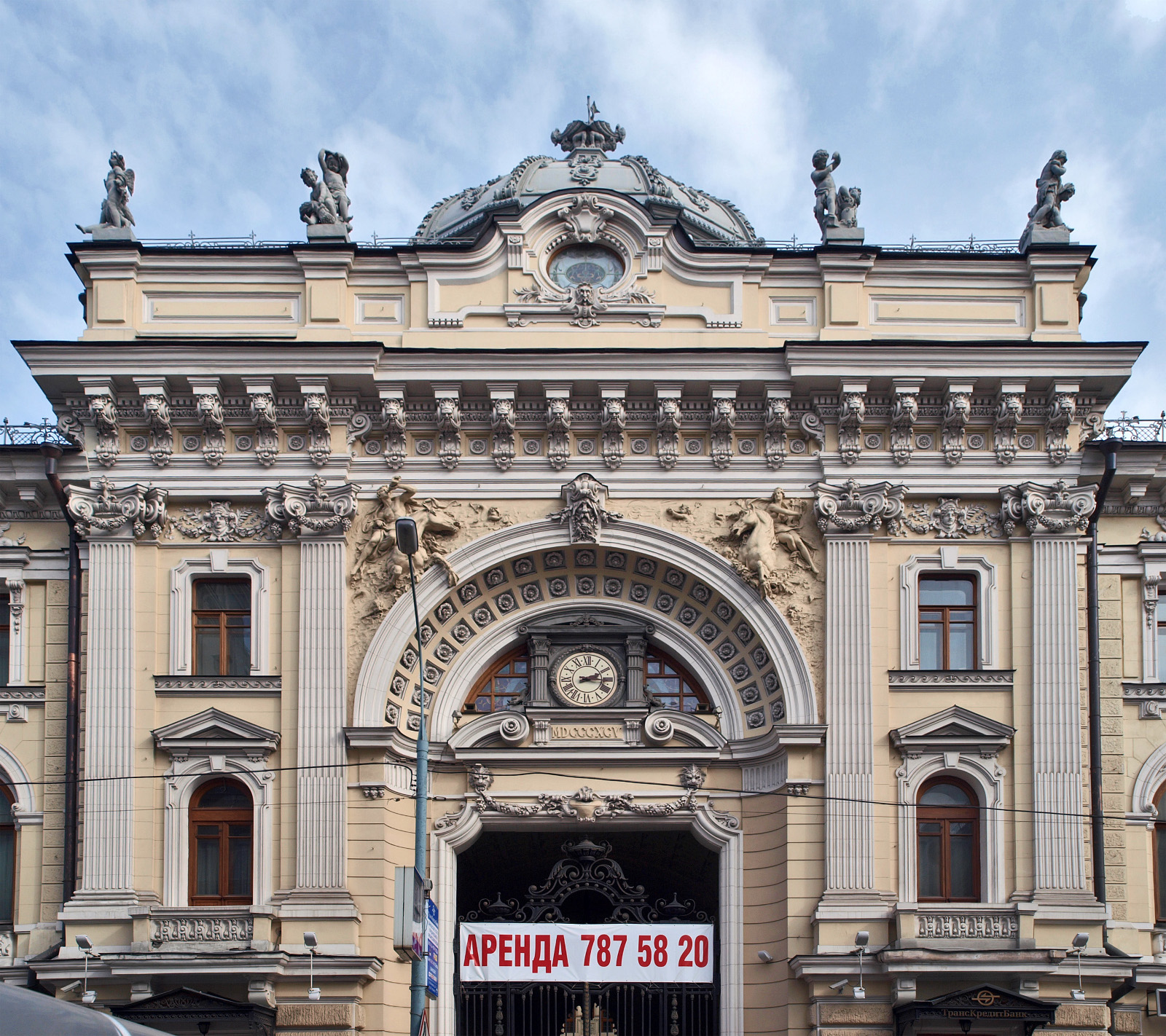
The ornate facade of the main entrance to the Sanduny Baths

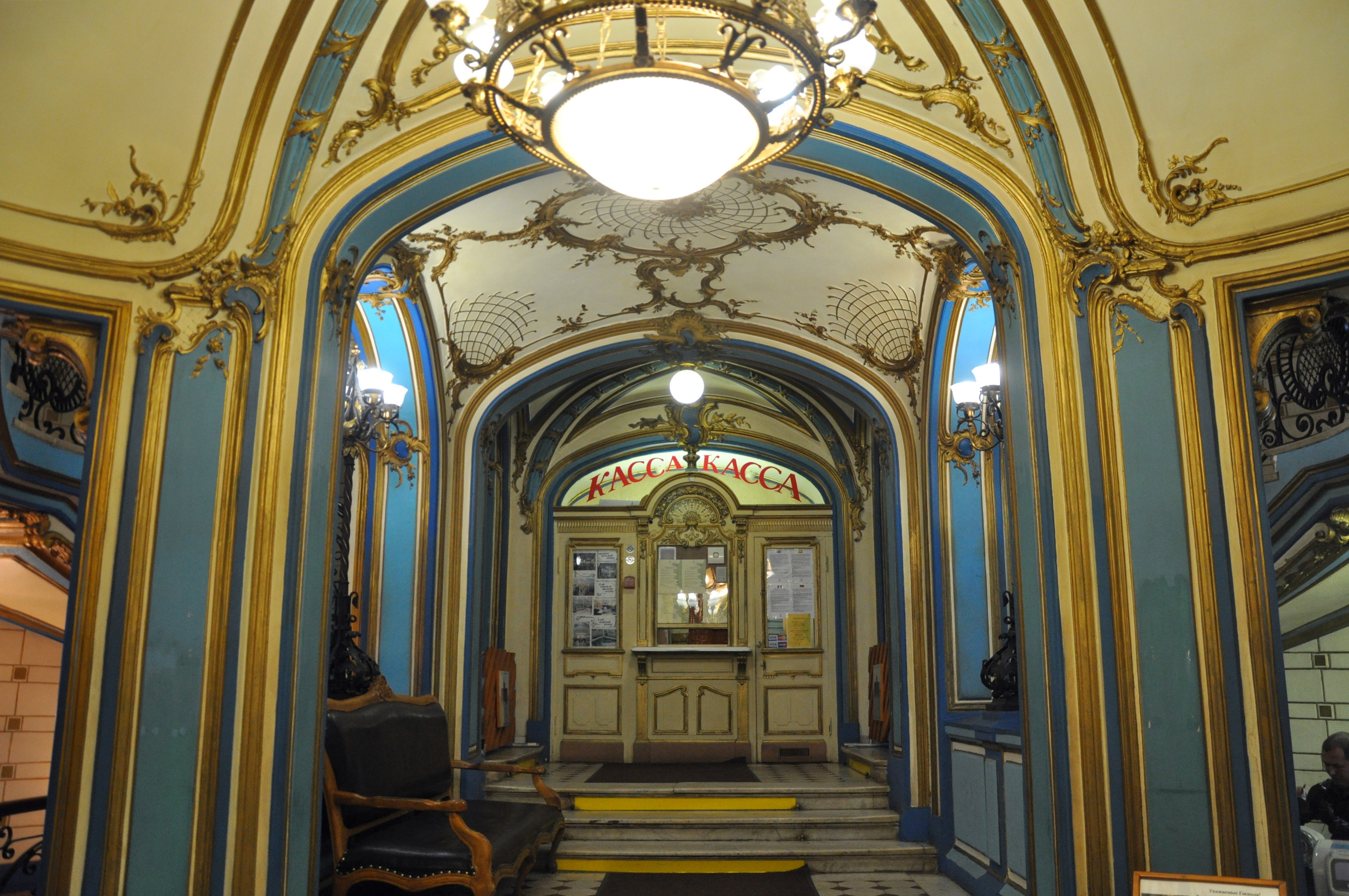
The interior of the baths with view at the box office

Sandunоvskie Baths (Russian: Сандуновские бани) or Sandunу (Сандуны́, IPA: [səndʊˈnɨ]) is a cultural and architectural landmark in downtown Moscow, located at 14 Neglinnaya street adjacent to the Central Bank of Russia. First opened in 1808, the baths were founded by and named after the Georgian businessman Sila Sandunov (Zandukeli) (1756–1820), who was once an actor at the court of Catherine II during the 1790s. He bought a land plot on the Neglinnaya River in 1800 to construct baths there.

== History of ownership ==
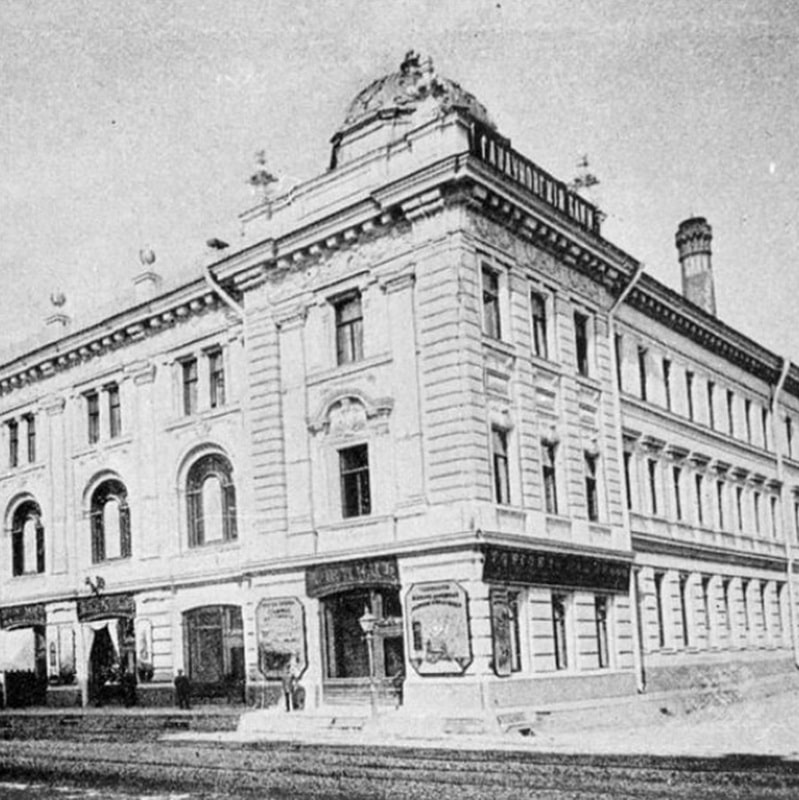
The building of the Sanduny Baths, historical photo

In 1869, owned by merchant and landlord Ivan Firsanov, the baths were willed to Ivan Firsanov's only daughter, Vera Ivanovna, after his death in 1881.

After Vera divorced her first husband, she married again to the officer Alexey Ganetsky, who was a son of General Nikolay Ganetsky, participant of the Crimean War. Alexey proposed the idea of building new baths of the like Moscow had never before seen on the place of the decaying building.

In 1894, Ganetsky hired a well-known architect Boris Freidenberg, but he dropped the project and left Moscow. However, the baths were finished by Sergey Kalugin and opened on February 14, 1896. Not long after completion, Ganetsky lost his ownership of Sanduny playing cards; afterward, Vera Ivanovna paid his debts and divorced again.

The baths received water via a specially built aqueduct from the Babyegorodskaya Dam on the Moscow River and from 700 feet of artesian well. Electrical illumination was provided by a private electric power station, which was also used on the coronation of Nikolai II.

Besides the baths, Sanduny also included a hotel, restaurants, and even the Zoological shop of F. A. Achilles. Sanduny was serviced by approximately 400 attendants.

The restaurant and baths still operate today.
