= Ensemble Georgika =

Georgian traditional music group

The Ensemble Georgika was formed in Tbilisi in 1989. The thirteen members of Ensemble Georgika, likely the first group of their kind to exist without government funding or support, grew up among a variety of Georgian folk music and ritual dances.

Beginning as an a cappella troupe that performed working, table, and ritual songs, as well as Georgian Orthodox liturgical chants, in 1990 the group was joined in performance by Aleko Khizanishvili and his trio of instrumentalists who play Salamuri and Panduri.
