= Adysh Gospels =

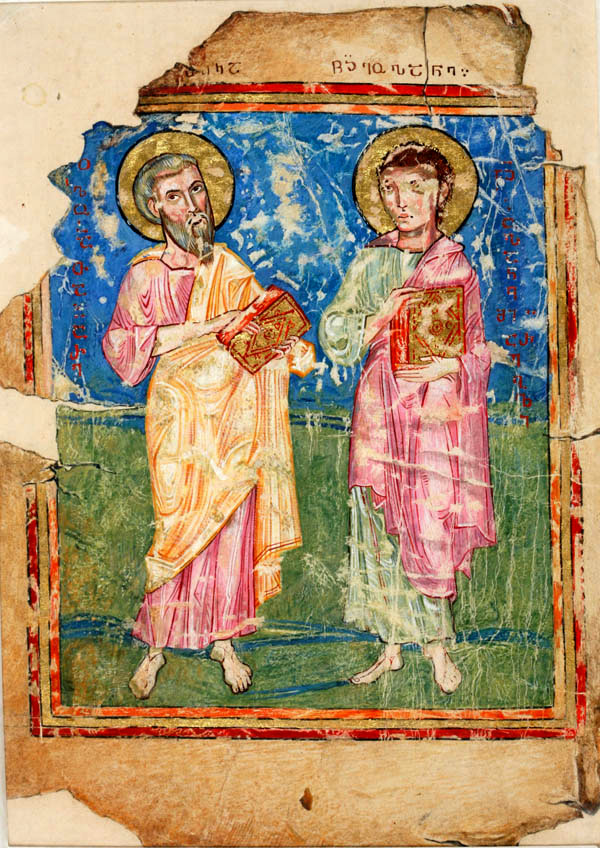
St Luke and St John, an illustration from the title page of the Adysh Gospels

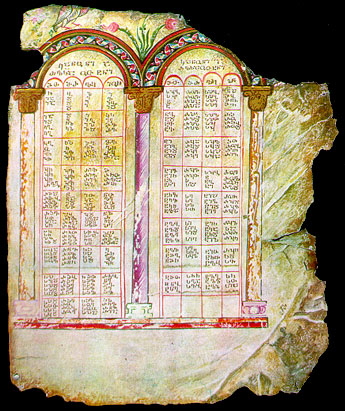
A Georgian reproduction of the Canon table by Eusebius of Caesarea

The Adishi Gospels (Adishi Four Gospels) (Georgian: ადიშის ოთხთავი) is an important early medieval Gospel Book from Georgia.

The oldest dated extant manuscript of the Georgian version of the Gospels, it was created by Mikaeli at Shatberdi Monastery in the southwestern Georgian princedom of Klarjeti (located now in northeastern Turkey) in AD 897, and later removed thence to be preserved in the remote village of Adishi in highland Svaneti. The first five folios (30 x 25 cm) of the manuscript are illuminated.

The manuscript was first published, in 1916, by the prominent Georgian scholar Ekvtime Takaishvili. It has been extensively studied by both Georgian and international scholars (e.g., Robert Pierpont Blake of Harvard University). The manuscript is now preserved in the Mestia Ethnographic Museum, Georgia.

== Text ==
It lacks text of Christ's agony at Gethsemane (Luke 22:43–44), and pericope of the adulteress (John 7:53-8:11), Longer Ending of Mark (Mark 16:9–20), the tradition of an angel who stirred the waters at the Pool of Bethesda (John 5:4), necessity for praying to Jesus (John 14:14), parable of two men in the field (Luke 17:36), Jesus' remark about his listeners (Mark 7:16), Jesus' speech about cutting sinful feet (Mark 9:44, 46), and Jesus' advice to forgive sins to others (Mark 11:26), Jesus' remark about people who do not go without prayer or fasting (Matthew 17:21), and one of Jesus' condemnatory sentences towards Scribes and Pharisees (Matthew 23:14); Thus providing the only (but earliest) Georgian witness for the omission of these passages.

The gospel also has some interesting variants. For example, in both Matthew 19:24 and Mark 10:25 the text reads "rope" instead of traditional "camel".

== See also ==
- Vani Gospels

== References and further reading ==
- Blake, Robert P. The Old Georgian Version of the Gospel of Matthew from the Adysh Gospels with the Variants of the Opiza and Tbet` Gospels. Edited with a Latin Translation [1933] (patrologia orientalis, 24/1). Turnhout: Brepols, 1976, 167 p.
- David Marshall Lang, Recent Work on the Georgian New Testament. Bulletin of the School of Oriental and African Studies, University of London, Vol. 19, No. 1 (1957), pp. 82–93
- Akaki Shanidze, Two Old Recensions of the Georgian Gospels according to Three Shatberd Manuscripts (AD 897, 936, and 973) [in Georgian]; (Monuments of the Old Georgian Language, ii. Tbilisi: Academy of Sciences, 1945), p. 062.
