= Kotar (instrument) =

A kotar is a type of prepared guitar with a sound reminiscent of the koto. Guitarist Kaki King used a kotar on the hidden track at the end of her album Legs to Make Us Longer.
