= Pyotr Bletkin =

Soviet artist

Bletkin Peter
- Born: 20 June 1903; Tiflis, Russian Empire (now Tbilisi, Georgia)
- Died: 4 February 1988 (aged 84); Tbilisi, Georgian S.S.R, U.S.S.R
- Occupation: Soviet artist

Peter M. Bletkin (Georgian: ბლიოტკინი პეტრე, Russian: Пётр Михайлович Блеткин); (20 June 1903 – 4 February 1988) was a Soviet and Georgian painter and graphic artist. He became a Honoured Artist of the Georgian Soviet Socialist Republic in 1961.

Bletkin was born in Tbilisi (Tiflis) on 20 June 1903. In 1915, Bletkin started his education in painting at the School of Painting, Sculpture and Architecture. The School of Painting, Sculpture and Architecture at the Imperial Academy of Arts was found in Tiflis after the visit of famous Russian artists – K. Makovsky and I. Repin. During the first year after opening the school was directed by famous artist and illustrator A. Kandaurov. Since 1902 up to 1917, the school had been headed by well-known graphic artist and painter Oskar Schmerling.

In 1923, Peter Bletkin entered the Tbilisi Academy of Arts. In 1929, Peter M. Bletkin graduated from Tbilisi State Academy of Art, specialty – painter. From 1928 to 1932 he worked at the Tbilisi Opera and Ballet as decorator. In 1932 he joined the Union of Artists of Georgia. In 1958, for their work the artist was awarded "Badge of Honour". In 1961 P. Bletkin was awarded the title of Honoured Artist of the Georgian Soviet Socialist Republic. Peter M. Bletkin died on 4 February 1988 at the age of 84 and is buried in the Pantheon Muhadverdi.
