= Givi Maisuradze =

Georgian geologist

D.Sc Givi Maisuradze
- Born: February 11, 1934 (age 92); Tbilisi, Georgian SSR, Soviet Union
- Spouse: Nina Klopotovskaia

Academic background
- Education: School #6, Tbilisi
- Alma mater: Tbilisi State University

Academic work
- Discipline: Geologist
- Institutions: Vakhushti Bagrationi Institute of Geography; Dzhanelidze Institute of Geology; Tbilisi State University

Givi Maisuradze (Georgian: გივი მაისურაძე; February 11, 1934) is a Georgian geologist, professor and doctor of science. He and his wife Nina Klopotovskaia, a paleontologist, were part of the research team that discovered early hominin skulls and later skeletons dating back to 1.8 million years old in Dmanisi, Georgia.

== Early life and career ==
Maisuradze was born on February 11, 1934, in the capital of Georgia, Tbilisi. In 1952 he graduated from School #6 in Tbilisi. Between 1952 and 1957 he attended Tbilisi State University specializing in Geography and Geology. In 1957, he obtained the title of Engineer Geologist at Tbilisi State University. Between 1957 and 1960 Maisuradze worked as Geologist and Hydrologist at the Soviet Union's Geological Military District 15, where he was publishing his research studies on Caucasian region and Middle East. From 1961 to 1980 he worked at the department of Quaternary Geology at the Vakhushti Bagrationi Institute of Geography, where he started as a senior laboratory worker before advancing to the position of the senior scientist. In 1970, he defended his thesis on the subject of geomorphology and paleogeography. In February 1980, he was transferred to the Dzhanelidze Institute of Geology, as a senior scientist of regional geology and tectonic department, where he worked until 2007. As part of his research he has traveled to Central Asia, Europe, Canada and China.

Between 2002 and 2004, Givi Maisuradze conducted a research on Caucasian Seismic Information Network for Hazard and Risk Assessment. Between 1997 and 2005 worked on Dmanisi sight where archeological research was conducted for several years after the discovery of Homo Erectus in Dmanisi.

In 2007 Maisuradze took a semi-retirement, while still working part-time at the Institute of Geology and teaching Quaternary Geology at Tbilisi State University.

He has had 130 research works published, including 21 in the Impaqt Journal.

=== Specialization ===
Maisuradze specializes in young (Quaternary) volcanoes, terrestrial magnetism, neotectonics, archeology, statgraphics of quaternary layers and their regional and world correlations.

== Awards ==
- 1976 – Order of Merit of the Academy of Sciences of the Soviet Union
- 1982 – INQUA international congress awarded by B. Sokolov
- 1983 – Recognition of Georgian Society of Science for the participation in the creation of Georgian Red Book about the nature protection (Tsiteli Tsigni).
- 2001– Received Order of Merit from the president of Georgia for the discoveries made in Dmanisi region.
