= Guram Tikanadze =

Georgian alpinist and photographer

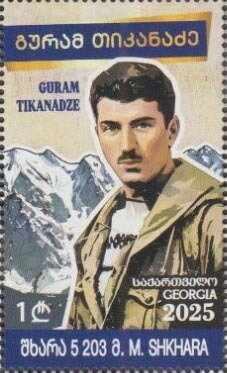
Tikanadze on a 2025 stamp of Georgia

Guram Tikanadze (Georgian: გურამ თიკანაძე; (September 12, 1932 – August 27, 1963) was a Georgian alpinist and photographer. He studied at the Tbilisi 1st Public School. Tikanadze was a geologist, he graduated from the Tbilisi State University, the faculty of Geography and Geology. Between 1956 and 1959 he worked at the Vakhushti Bagrationi Institute of Geography. Guram Tikanadze was interested in different types of sports; by 1956, he was a first-class boxer. He was in the 7th grade when he became interested in photography and studied at the Tbilisi Pioneer Palace, under the supervision of famous photographers – Niko Sagharadze and Sergo Akhvlediani. From 1975 the circle of young photographers was named after Guram Tikanadze. His first success was in 1958, when he published his work, "A Song of Water". In 1959, he began to work on the "Drosha" magazine as a photo-reporter. The same year, he received the silver medal for his work, "Ole," in Vienna and it became the first international award in the history of Georgian photography. In the same year, he received a bronze medal at the Modena International Photo Contest for his work "Tbilisi Sea". In 1962, he became the head of the photo-department at the Union of Georgian Journalists in Tbilisi. His works were regularly published in various international publications in Poland, Czechoslovakia, Germany, Italy and Hong Kong. He was a participant in several photo exhibitions. Among his famous photos are: “Sweet Melon”, “Mountain Daybreak”, “Meskhi Attacks”, “Tetnuldi – A Bride of Svaneti”, “Ushba”, “Tenzing Norgay”, “Paradox of rain”, “Old Tbilisi”, etc. In his works, Guram Tikanadze paired a poetic mode of thinking with journalism. Guram Tikanadze's activities coincided with the so-called “Khrushchev Thaw” period, when young photographers intentionally ignored the rules of staged photography and were boldly pushing reportage photography forward. Guram Tikanadze greatly contributed to the development of Georgian photography by creating a certain cultural and genetic tradition. Guram Tikanadze was a student when he became interested in Alpinism. During his short life, he managed to climb up to 40 mountaintops. His first was “Spartacus” in 1952. From 1957 onward, he was climbing grade 5 mountaintops. The first such summit was Mount Garmo in the Pamirs, in 1957. During the period between August and September in 1958, Guram Tikanadze, along with a group of four people, accomplished the most difficult traverse on the main chain of the Central Caucasus. He conquered 14 out of 16 mountaintops and was awarded the silver medal of the Soviet Union (none of the group members received the gold medal). In 1961, he headed a traverse of both mountaintops of [Ushba]. In August 1963, with a sport group that he headed, he conquered Tetnuldi. On August 21, the group reached Shkhara. He died on August 27, while descending the mountain. He hammered a wooden pole into a rock gap, attached a rope to it and began to descend, but the wooden pole slipped from the gap. His body was brought from the mountains on September 1, by a group of mountaineers headed by Beknu Khergiani and Chichiko Chartolani. In 1980, in the Latali village of Svaneti, with the initiative and support of the local population, the Guram Tikanadze Sports Center and Museum was opened.
