= Iago Dekanozishvili =

Georgian artist

- Born: 1951 (age 74–75); Tbilisi
- Education: Tbilisi State Academy of Fine Arts
- Occupation: Artist
- Known for: Reviving Georgian cloisonne enamel art
- Notable work: Georgian enamelwork

Iago Dekanozishvili (born in 1951 in Tbilisi) is a Georgian artist, a graduate of the Tbilisi State Academy of Fine Arts

A winner of numerous International competitions from Paris to Moscow, Mr. Dekanozishvili's art is placed in several museums in Georgia and is part of many private collections in Moscow, St. Petersburg, Paris, Copenhagen, Cologne, Washington, Los Angeles and New York.

Georgian cloisonne enamel is an artistic form which was developed between the years 500 and 1200 AD. Renowned throughout the world as the finest available, Georgian enamelwork was prized for its refined elegance and diversity of artistic forms. The art had been lost since the 12th century, until it was revived by Mr. Iago Dekanozishvili.
