= Tamriko Siprashvili =

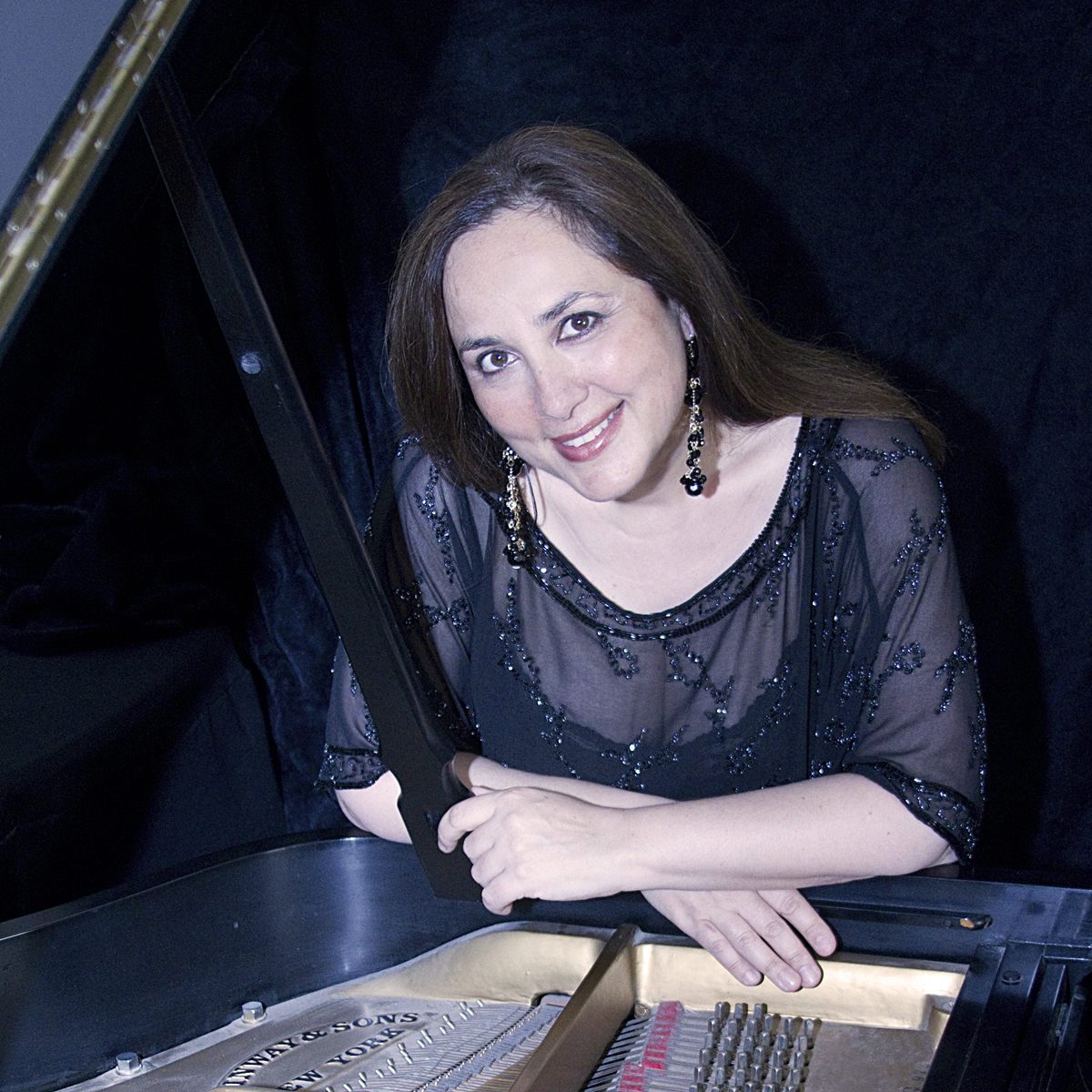
- Siprashvili performing in 2024

Background information
- Born: Tbilisi, Georgia
- Genre: Classical
- Occupations: Pianist, educator
- Instrument: Piano
- Years active: 1985–present
- Labels: Nimbus Records, XCP Records
- Website: www.inspiremusicacademy.com

Tamriko Siprashvili is a Georgian-American concert pianist and music educator. Known for her interpretations of the Romantic repertoire, she is a first-prize winner of the Robert Schumann International Competition and a designated Steinway Artist.

== Training ==
Siprashvili began her piano studies at the age of three. At age five, she entered the Special Music School for Gifted Children in Tbilisi. At 17, she was admitted to the Moscow Conservatory, where she studied primarily with Mikhail Voskresensky. In 1985, she graduated with a Doctorate in Musicology and Piano Performance.

== Career ==
Following her studies, Siprashvili won the 1st Prize (Gold Medal) at the IX Robert Schumann International Competition for Pianists and Singers in Zwickau, Germany.

She has toured Europe, the United States, and Argentina, performing as a soloist with the Berlin Konzerthaus, the Leipzig Gewandhaus Orchestra, and the Arturo Toscanini Philharmonic Orchestra. In the United States, she has appeared with the Oakland Symphony under the direction of Michael Morgan.

== Music Academy ==
In 1995, Siprashvili relocated to Northern California. In 2009, she founded the Inspire Academy of Music and Arts in Pleasanton, California. Her students have gained admission to institutions including the Eastman School of Music, NYU, and the Manhattan School of Music.

== Discography ==
Year	Album Title	Label	Notes
2004	Mussorgsky: Pictures at an Exhibition; Stravinsky: The Rite of Spring	Nimbus Records	Duo-piano with Mark Anderson.
2000	Rachmaninoff: Chopin and Corelli Variations	XCP Records	Recorded at the Theater of Poitiers, France.
1998	Kreisler: Liebesfreud and Liebesleid	XCP Records	Solo piano arrangements.
1995	Schumann: Carnaval, Op. 9 & Kreisleriana, Op. 16	Nimbus Records	Featured in the "Grand Piano" series.
