= Alexander Nikuradse =

Georgian-German physicist & Nazi political scientist (1900-1981)

Alexander Nikuradse (Aleksandre Nikuradze; Georgian: ალექსანდრე ნიკურაძე), also known by his pseudonym Al. Sanders, (November 10, 1900 – June 13, 1981) was a Georgian-German physicist and Nazi political scientist.

Born in Samtredia, Georgia, Russian Empire, he was sent by the Georgian government to complete his studies in Berlin. Nikuradse remained in Berlin and became a German citizen after the 1921 Red Army invasion of Georgia. Being in staunch opposition to Soviet rule in Georgia, he was actively involved in Georgian émigré activities, and had close Nazi connections. Since their common days as Soviet exiles in Munich in the early 1920s, he had been on friendly terms with Alfred Rosenberg whose views on the Caucasus were largely shaped under Nikuradse's influence. He tried to lobby for an independent Georgia, and enlist German support for anti-Soviet Georgian political emigration. Influenced by Karl Haushofer's theory of "large spaces", he conceived an ambitious project of the German protectorate over the projected Caucasian confederation in which the Georgians were to play the leading role.

As a physicist, he chiefly engaged in applied physics. In particular he investigated dielectric materials and the theories of electrons and ions.

He died in Munich, Germany. His brother, Johann Nikuradse (1894–1979), was also a notable German-based physicist.

== Works ==
- Al. Sanders (1942), Kaukasien, Nordkaukasien, Aserbeidschan, Armenien, Georgien, geschichtlicher Umriß. München: Hoheneichen-Verlag.
- Al. Sanders (1942), Osteuropa in kontinentaleuropaeischer Schau. München: Hoheneichen-Verlag.
- Al. Sanders (1942), Um das Erbe Großbritanniens. Zur Wandlung der politischen Struktur der Übersee. München: Hoheneichen-Verlag.
- Nikuradse, Alexander (1952), Naturwissenschaft und Technik im Leben der Völker. Oldenbourg, München.
