= Tatuna Nikolaishvili =

Georgian fashion designer

Alieta Tatuna Nikolaishvili (Georgian: ალიეტა ტატუნა ნიკოლაიშვილი) is a Georgian fashion designer based in Tbilisi.

Tatuna graduated from Tbilisi State Academy of Arts, L'institut Marangoni Paris.

She created her brand in 2003. The main character of this brand lies in its distinguished pattern techniques, which Tatuna masters so powerfully, and thus creating dynamic designs. It is not the material that dictates the design but the unique ability of the designer to manipulate the lines and creates truly wearable haut couture handmade garments. Her clothes are sold in Georgia, France, United Kingdom, Japan, China, South Korea and Ukraine.
