= Ria Keburia =

Georgian fashion designer

Ria Keburia (Georgian: რია ქებურია) born Lia Keburia is a Georgian fashion designer based in Paris. Keburia studied at American University of Paris and Institut français de la mode. She established her brand in 2012. Keburia is mostly active in the Russian fashion scene. Japanese cultural interests made her change her stage name from Lia to Ria.
