= Nata Menabde =

Georgian executive director (born 1960)

Nata (Natela) Menabde (born 27 May 1960) is a Georgian executive director of the World Health Organization since May 2015. She is credited with having led the policy work that resulted in UN General Assembly resolutions on antimicrobial resistance, tuberculosis and global health and foreign policy.

Menabde laid the cornerstone for the work that culminated into the path breaking European Tallinn Charter on Health Systems, Health and Wealth in 2008. She has also been leading the WHO India office, during which time India became polio-free in 2014.

Menabde has been a strong supporter of raising taxes on tobacco as a means to keep tobacco-related disease down by lowering consumption all the while raising funds for state coffers, especially when it comes to non-smokable tobacco.

Menabde obtained an M.Sc. in Pharmacy from the Tbilisi State Medical Institute, Georgia, in 1983, as well as a Ph.D. in Pharmacology from the USSR Academy of Medical Sciences, Moscow, in 1986. She also holds several certificates in Health Management, Leadership, and Health Economics from the United States, the United Kingdom, India and Sweden.
