= Ekaterine Abuladze =

Georgian painter (born 1964)

Ekaterine Abuladze, known as Eka (Georgian: ეკატერინე აბულაძე, romanized: ek'at'erine abuladze) (born 13 October 1964) is a Georgian painter.

Born in Tbilisi, Abuladze studied at that city's Academy of Arts, matriculating in 1983 and completing a degree in fine arts in 1989. She returned to the institution in 1992 to study architecture, graduating from that faculty in 1994. During her career she has exhibited extensively both in Georgia and abroad. Besides painting, Abuladze has also worked as a fashion designer. She runs a teaching studio in Tbilisi. Several of her paintings may be found in the collection of the Georgian Museum of Fine Arts.
