= Ietim Gurji =

Georgian poet

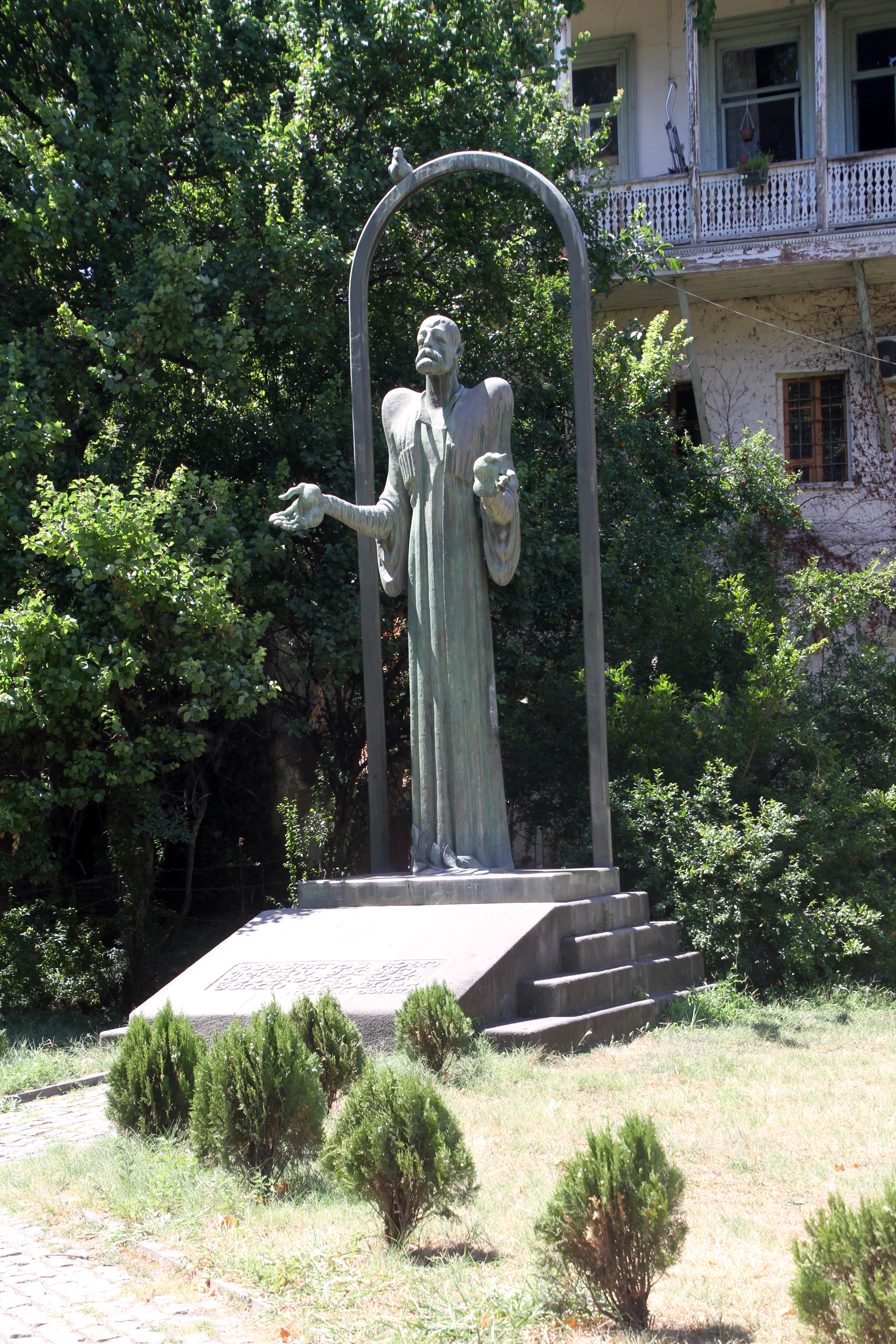
Statue of Yetim Gurdji in Old Tbilisi.

Ietim Gurji (Georgian: იეთიმ გურჯი, meaning "Georgian orphan" in Turkish and Azeri, real name: Ietim Ibrahim Dabghishvili (Georgian: იეთიმ იბრაიმის ძე დაბღიშვილი), baptized as Harutyun Grigoryevich Aghajanov (Russian: Арутюн Григорьевич Агаджанов); 1875 in Tbilisi – 15 July 1940) was a Georgian poet. He wrote in Georgian, Armenian and Azeri languages. His poetry mainly was distributed orally, by songs, which he created and performed himself. Main motifs of his poetry were the lives of late 19th and early 20th century Old Tbilisi bohemians, along with workers, peasants and petite bourgeoisie.

His first book "Poem of Anabadji" was published in 1909, collection of short poems "New Poet and Songs" - 1911, "Yetim's New Poems" - 1913, "Tango" - 1914. In 1928 Ioseb Grishashvili and in 1958 Andro Tevzadze published his "Selected Poems". Yetim Gurdji was buried in the Didube Pantheon of writers and public men, Tbilisi.
