= Irakli Nasidze =

Irakli Nasidze (Georgian: ირაკლი ნასიძე; born 1973, Tbilisi) is a Georgian artist. All around artist, he moved from pure graphic art towards fashion and haute couture, genuine field of expression for him.

== Biography ==
Raised in an aristocratic family in Georgia, Irakli was introduced to the world of art by his grandmother. The latter was crucial in Irakli's life, as she gave him the desire to pursue his artistic dreams. In 1996, Irakli graduated of the Academy of Fine Art in Tbilissi, and went to Paris where he slowly settled in the fashion landscape of Paris. Indeed, he saw in Paris a promised land for his artistic ambitions.

== Design career ==
In Paris, his artistic sense led him to work for Christian Lacroix and Jean-Louis Scherrer. He collaborated with several designers, up until 2002, when he created an haute couture collection under his own name. He has continued to collaborate throughout the years, particularly with Chopard in 2006 for their accessories.

=== Haute couture ===
In 2002, Irakli, sponsored and supported by Francois Lesage, launched his first haute couture collection. He exhibited at the Musée Galliera in Paris for his first collection. Thus, until 2010, Irakli Nasidze has presented no less than 10 haute couture collections making him the first creator of Georgian origin ever to present in France and abroad.
