= Luca Lazar =

Georgian artist (born 1957)

Luka Lasareishvili (Georgian: ლუკა ლასარეიშვილი; born 14 November 1957), known professionally as Luca Lazar, is a Georgian artist.

== Biography ==
He was born on 14 November 1957 in Tbilisi, Georgia, then the Soviet Union. He studied at the Tbilisi State Academy of Arts from 1976 to 1982, graduating with a Masters of Fine Arts degree. Since 1982 he has been working as an independent artist, and has participated in numerous solo and group exhibitions in galleries and museums. He has worked in a variety of media: painting, installations, object and video art.

From 1985 to 1988, Lazar lived and worked in Moscow, before moving to Paris. Lazar spent 1989 in Kassel, Germany, as an artist-in-residence with the Museum Fridericianum. From 1990 to 2003, he lived and worked in Cologne. Lazar remained in Germany through the fall of the Soviet Union and turbulence in his native Georgia, and he eventually received German citizenship. From 1997 until 2005, he held a position as lecturer at the European Academy of Fine Arts in Trier, Germany. In 2003, Lazar relocated to New York City, where he has continued his artistic career.

== Art ==
Studio view: Luca Lazar and works from series "Moving Stills"

By the late 1990s, Lazar started to concentrate mainly on geometrical art, which was followed by minimal abstract explorations, resulting in a series titled "The White Curtain" and a series titled "One-liners". From this point onward Lazar started to develop his own signature style, based on minimal abstract art, geometric art, optical art and containing undertones of expressionist art. His works are described as "Moving Stills", due to their sensation of continuous flowing movement in space.
