= Kahtar =

Kahtar كهتر
- Village
- Location within Iran
- Coordinates: 34°41′59″N 47°48′43″E
- Country: Iran
- Province: Kermanshah
- County: Sonqor
- Bakhsh: Central
- Rural District: Parsinah

Population (2006)
  - Total: 123
- Time zone: UTC+3:30 (IRST)
  - Summer (DST): UTC+4:30 (IRDT)

Kahtar (Persian: كهتر; also known as Kotar) is a village in Parsinah Rural District, in the Central District of Sonqor County, Kermanshah Province, Iran. At the 2006 census, its population was 123, in 26 families.
