= Platon Ioseliani =

Georgian historian and civil servant

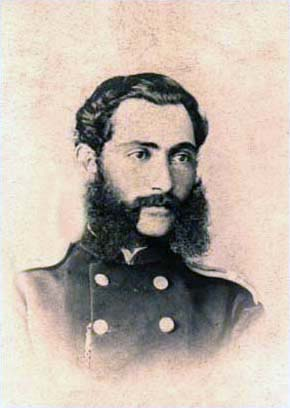
Platon Ioseliani

Platon Ioseliani (Georgian: პლატონ იოსელიანი; November 15, 1810 – November 15, 1875) was a Georgian historian and civil servant in the Russian Empire.

== Biography ==
Educated at Saint Petersburg Theological Academy, Ioseliani taught physics and philosophy at Tbilisi Theological Seminary and later served for the office of the Viceroy of the Caucasus. His articles were regularly published in the Russian and Georgian press. From 1845 to 1856, he edited the Tbilisi-based periodical Zakavkazsky Vestnik. In 1849, with the support of Viceroy Mikhail Vorontsov, he made a state-sponsored trip to Greece and visited the medieval Georgian Iviron Monastery on Mount Athos. He discovered and studied several old Georgian manuscripts, conducted substantial research on the history of the Georgian Orthodox Church and published pieces of medieval and early modern Georgian literature. Beyond that, Ioseliani was the first scholar to study the evolution of urban settlements in Georgia. One of his last major works, that on the reign of the last king of Georgia, George XII (r. 1798–1800), was published posthumously in the Georgian magazine Iveria in 1880.

Ioseliani was married to Princess Ana Bagration-Mukhraneli (1839–1913).
