= Michael Vadbolsky =

Painter, writer and researcher of chess history (1899–1990)

Michael Vadbolsky (Russian: Михаил Николаевич Вадбольский; Georgian: მიხეილ ვადბოლსკი; 1899–1990) was a painter, writer and researcher of chess history who contributed to the development of the Georgian Chess School. Born in Warsaw, he studied painting in Saint Petersburg. During the Civil war in Russia Vadbolsky's family was killed and Michael decided to settle in Georgia. Vadbolsky took an interest in Georgian emblems and the history of their creation. He painted the portraits of historical people of Georgia, Armenia and old Eastern countries.

He also discovered Georgian historical patrimonial flags and emblems and found the signatures of Georgian political and public figures and examples of Georgian money and cloth. He recovered these materials from the museums of Tbilisi, Moscow and Petersburg, from gravestones, from the walls of Georgian churches and monasteries, and from miniatures of manuscripts. In 1981, Vadbolsky received the title of Honored Painter.

== Sources ==
- "მიხეილ ვადბოლსკი". Biographical Dictionary of Georgia (in Georgian). National Parliamentary Library of Georgia.
