= Valerian Zirakadze =

Georgian footballer

Personal information
- Date of birth: 19 April 1978 (age 48)
- Height: 1.77 m (5 ft 9 1/2 in)
- Position: Midfielder

Senior career*
Years	Team	Apps	(Gls)
?–1999	FC Metallurg Rustavi		
1999–2000	Skoda Xanthi		
2000–2002	FC Tatabánya		
2003	Kavala F.C.		
2003	Agrotikos Asteras F.C.		
2003–2006	Kilkisiakos		
2006–2008	Kavala F.C.		
- * Club domestic league appearances and goals

Valerian Zirakadze (born 19 April 1978) is a Georgian footballer who is currently a free agent.
