= Vasily Sopromadze =

Vasily Sopromadze Platonovich
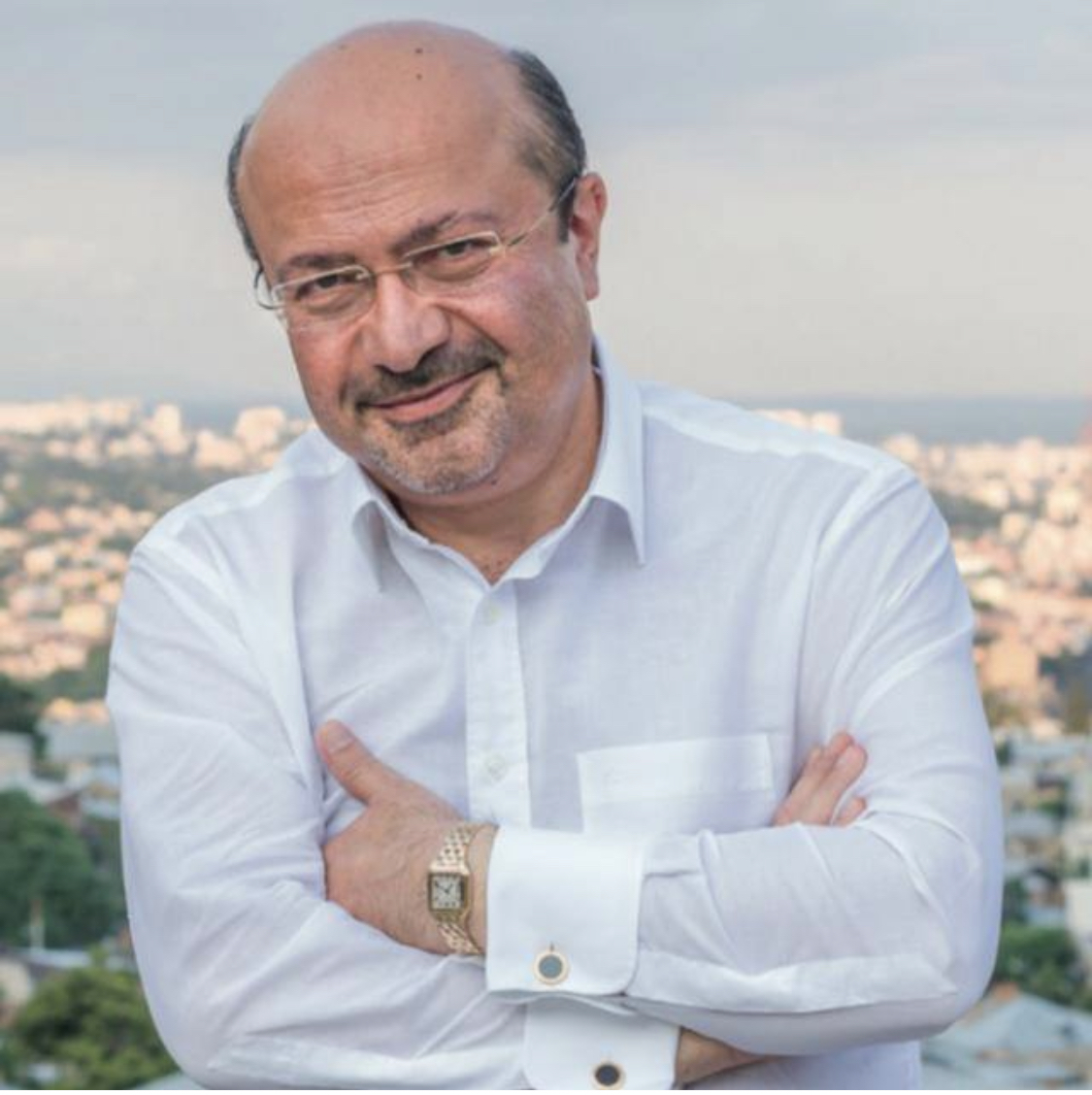
- Born: 9 December 1963 (age 62); Poti, Soviet Union
- Occupation: Fresco Retail Group
- Spouse: Madona Kikoria
- Children: 2

Vasily Sopromadze Platonovich (born 9 December 1963) is a business magnate and philanthropist. He is the founder of Fresco retail group that operates a chain of supermarkets across Georgia.

== Education ==
After being seconded abroad in 1985, Vasily Sopromadze graduated from The Leningrad Engineering-Economic Institute, named after Palmiro Tolyatti.

== Life and Business career ==
From 1985 to 1987, Vasily Sopromadze advanced from foreman to site manager at Trust No 6 Glavleningradstroy. In 1987, he was appointed chief engineer of the Fourth Research-and-Production Enterprise of Association "Restorer" and in 1988, was elected as its director. In 1989, Vasily Sopromadze established and headed "ITUS" (ITaly rUSsia) until 1996. Between 1996 and 1998, he supervised a number of large enterprises of Georgia. From 1998, Vasily Sopromadze founded and headed Corporation S LLC, a leading property development corporation in Saint-Petersburg, Russian Federation. The firm developed extensive residential and commercial buildings predominantly in Tsentralny.

In 2012, Vasily Sopromadze founded the supermarket chain "Fresco" in Georgia. Fresco has eight locations across Georgia and many areas of Tbilisi, such as Varketili, Mukhiani, Ortachala, Saburtalo, Chugureti and Sanzona. In 2015, the company announced plans to develop and launch four more supermarkets.

== Family life ==
Vasily Sopromadze is married with two children, son and a daughter.

== Politics ==
Between 1994 and 1996 Vasily Sopromadze was a member of a number of working groups of Expert Council at the Government of the Russian Federation.

== Honours ==
- The active member of The Russian Academy of Science, culture and public work, the academician.
- The Honorable Builder of Russia.
- The Knight of Saint George Award of 1-st degree.
