= Sila Zandukeli-Sandunov =

Sila Sandunov Silovan Zandukeli
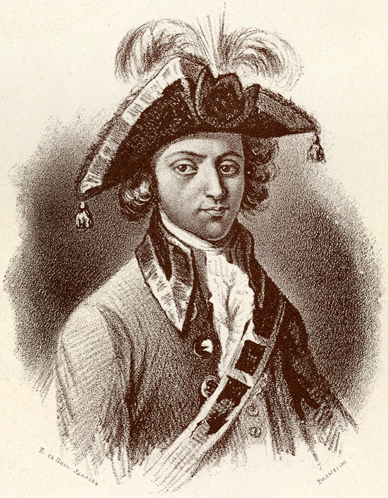
- 18th century portrait of Sandunov
- Born: 1756
- Died: 1820 (aged 63–64)
- Occupations: Actor, Businessman
- Known for: Sanduny Baths; performing for Catherine the Great

Sila Nikolaevich Sandunov (Russian: Сила Николаевич Сандунов), born Silovan Nikolozis dze Zandukeli (Georgian: სილოვან ზანდუკელი), (born 1756— Died 1820) was a businessman and actor of Georgian origin active at the court of Catherine the Great. Sandunov's family emigrated from Georgia to the Russian Empire as part of an entourage accompanying the exiled Georgian monarch Vakhtang VI.

== Life ==
Sandunov is best remembered today as the founder of the eponymous Sanduny Baths, an architectural and cultural landmark of downtown Moscow. The businessman started his investment in the baths by selling diamonds he had received as a wedding gift from Empress Catherine, who personally attended the wedding ceremony at the royal chapel.

Sandunov was married to mezzo-soprano Elizabeth Sandunova.
