= Alexander Toradze =

Georgian-born American pianist (1952–2022)

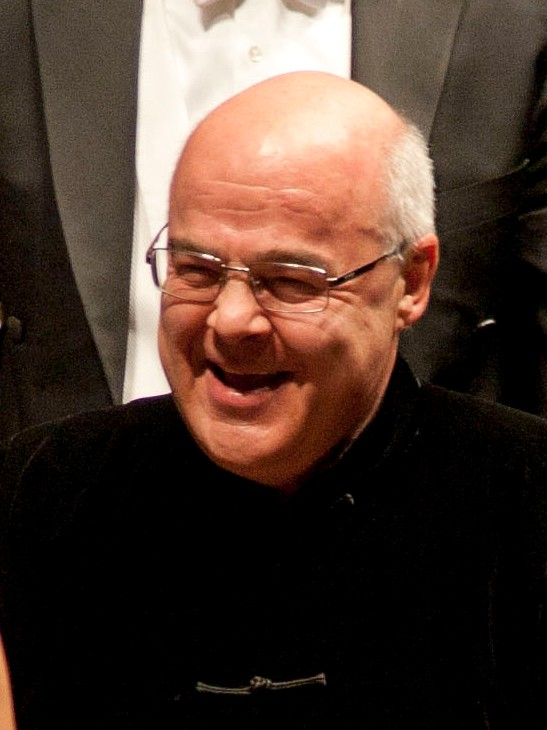
- Born: May 30, 1952; Tbilisi, Georgian Soviet Socialist Republic
- Died: May 11, 2022 (aged 69); South Bend, Indiana, U.S.
- Occupations: Pianist, pedagogue
- Spouse: Susan Blake (m. 1990; div. 2002)
- Awards: Silver medal, Van Cliburn International Piano Competition (1977)

Alexander Davidovich "Lexo" Toradze (Georgian: ალექსანდრე თორაძე Aleksandre Toradze; May 30, 1952 – May 11, 2022) was a Georgian-born American pianist, best known for his classical Russian repertoire, with a career spanning over three decades. He regularly appeared as soloist with many of the world's major orchestras, including the Berlin Philharmonic, the Mariinsky Theatre Orchestra, the New York Philharmonic, the Cleveland Orchestra, and the London Philharmonic Orchestra. He was a professor of piano at Indiana University South Bend from 1991 to 2017.

== Early life ==
Born in Tbilisi, Georgian SSR, to parents David, a famous Georgian composer, and Liana Asatiani , a famous movie actress and ophthalmologist, Alexander Toradze entered Tbilisi's central music school at six and first played with orchestra at nine. He continued his studies at the Moscow Conservatory in Moscow at nineteen under Yakov Zak, Boris Zemliansky, and Lev Naumov, graduating in 1978.

== Career ==
In 1977, Toradze won the silver medal in the Fifth Van Cliburn International Piano Competition in Fort Worth, Texas. Pianist and jury member Lili Kraus later told The New York Times: "...I have never heard, and I am sure no one else has either, power and passion with such limitless potential. He uses every atom, every fiber of his body for no other purpose than that of living the music. He is, like Radu Lupu when he won, a mixture of the animal and the angel. It is first-prize playing."

In 1983, while on tour with the Bolshoi Symphony Orchestra of Moscow, he requested asylum at the American Embassy in Madrid and made his home in the United States.

In 1991, Toradze became the Martin Endowed Professor of Piano at Indiana University South Bend. Members of the international Toradze Piano Studio at IUSB were active participants in summer festivals including those in Salzburg, White Nights Festival, London Proms, Edinburgh, Ravinia, Ruhr, Rotterdam, Mikkeli, Finland, Hollywood Bowl, Saratoga, Rome, Florence, Venice, Ravenna, Bologna, Lisbon, Ruhr Festival, and others.

Toradze appeared with the world's leading orchestras, such as Berlin Philharmonic, Mariinsky Theatre Orchestra, La Scala Philharmonic, Maggio Musicale Fiorentino, Bavarian Radio Symphony Orchestra, St. Petersburg Philharmonic, Orchestre National de France, City of Birmingham Symphony, London's Symphony, Philharmonic and Philharmonia Orchestras, NHK in Japan, Czech, Hungarian, Israeli, Rotterdam, Warsaw Philharmonics, the radio orchestras in Belgium, Germany, the Netherlands, Sweden, Finland and Italy. He performed with almost every major orchestra in the United States, including New York, Boston, Chicago, Cleveland, Philadelphia, Los Angeles, San Francisco, Minnesota, Houston, Detroit, Pittsburgh, Baltimore, Cincinnati, Seattle and Washington D.C. He also appeared with the symphonies of Montreal and Toronto. He worked with various notable conductors, including Vladimir Ashkenazy, Mikko Franck, Valery Gergiev, Paavo Järvi, Vladimir Jurowski, Gianandrea Noseda, Simon Rattle, Esa-Pekka Salonen, Jukka-Pekka Saraste, and Klaus Tennstedt.

Toradze was famous for his praying before he performed. When asked by classical radio host Bruce Duffie what advice he could give to aspiring concert pianists, Toradze replied, "Don't forget to pray to God before each performance and don't forget to give your soul enough air. Believe in the right purpose of art and believe in being human".

== Recordings ==
Toradze, who specialized in Russian composers such as Rachmaninoff, Prokofiev, Stravinsky, and Tchaikovsky, recorded for the Philips and Angel/EMI record labels. Amongst his most notable recordings is his 1998 Prokofiev's five piano concertos with Valery Gergiev and the Mariinsky Orchestra for the Philips record label. From this set, Prokofiev's Piano Concerto No. 3 was named by International Piano Quarterly as "historically the best on record" from among over seventy recordings. Other recordings, for Angel/EMI, include Mussorgsky's Pictures at an Exhibition, Prokofiev's Seventh Piano Sonata, Stravinsky's Three Scenes from Petrushka, and Ravel's Miroirs and Gaspard de la nuit.

== Personal life and death ==
From 1990 to 2002, Toradze was married to pianist Susan Blake, with whom he had two sons, Alex and David. On April 23, 2022, Toradze suffered acute heart failure during a performance with the Vancouver Symphony Orchestra USA in Vancouver, Washington. He died less than three weeks later on May 11, 2022, in South Bend, Indiana, aged 69.

== See also ==
- List of Georgians
