= Valentin Kontridze =

Valentine Solomonovich Kontridze (Georgian კონტრიძე) Sobol (Russian Соболь) (b. Georgia, USSR, 12 January 1933; d. Israel, 25 October 2002) was a Georgian Jewish scientist, ophthalmologist, and eye microsurgeon.

== Biography ==
In 1968 he defended the thesis for his Master of Medical degree. From 1977 to 1988 he was the head of the eye microsurgery department at the Institute of Advance Training for Doctors, Tbilisi, Georgia. Between 1976 and 1978 he completed a program in eye microsurgery at the All Union Scientific Research Institute, where his scientific adviser was academician M. Krasnova (an associate member of the National Academy, USSR). In 1980 he finished the course under the supervision of Associate Member of the Academy of Sciences S. Federov.

Kontridze was a specialist in plastic and reconstructive surgery on palpebra and conjunctiva. He performed corneal transplants, extra- and intra-capsule cataract extractions, and implanted artificial lenses. He performed all kinds of anti-glaucoma operations, worked on retinal detachment, virtual surgery, and trauma to the eye. He removed magnetic and anti-magnetic interocular objects, performed optic reconstructive operations, worked on eye muscles, orbits, and cosmetic repairs after enucleation of the eye.

In 1994, after political and criminal unrest in Georgia, Kontridze moved to Israel with his family, where he continued his scientific research at Shapiro’s organization. His 74 scientific research papers were published in the former USSR, Europe, and Asia. He is the author of multiple adopted rationalization proposals.

== Publications ==
- Kontridze, VS; Kvantaliani, IG (1980). "3 cases of scleral graft in Marfan's syndrome". Vestnik oftalmologii (4): 68–9. PMID 7414815.
- Ivanova, LA; Koroleva, VG; Kontridze, VS (1979). "Pharmacokinetic study of collagen-based intraocular films and caps of gentamycin sulfate". Farmatsiia. 28 (4): 31–4. PMID 488381.
- Antelava, DN; Kontridze, VS (1977). "Experience in mastering eye microsurgery". Vestnik oftalmologii (5): 16–8. PMID 906202.
