= Oganez Mkhitaryan =

Russian footballer and coach

Personal information
- Full name: Oganez Armenakovich Mkhitaryan
- Date of birth: 26 August 1962 (age 64)
- Height: 1.72 m (5 ft 7 1/2 in)
- Position: Midfielder

Youth career
- Gantiada Tbilisi

Senior career*
Years	Team	Apps	(Gls)
1980–1989	FC Fakel Voronezh	316	(27)
1990	FC Kotayk Abovian	12	(0)
1990–1991	FC Fakel Voronezh	40	(1)
1993–1994	FC Fakel Voronezh	50	(2)
1995–1998	FC Lokomotiv Liski	80	(12)

Managerial career
- 2000: FC Lokomotiv Liski (assistant)
- 2000: FC Lokomotiv Liski (caretaker)
- 2001: FC Lokomotiv Liski (administrator)
- 2008: FC Fakel Voronezh (assistant)
- 2010: FC Fakel Voronezh (administrator)
- * Club domestic league appearances and goals

Oganez Armenakovich Mkhitaryan (Russian: Оганез Арменакович Мхитарян; born 26 August 1962) is a Russian professional football coach and a former player.

== Playing career ==
He spent one season in the Soviet Top League with FC Fakel Voronezh.
