= Mikaeli =

Mikaeli (Georgian: მიქაელი) was a Georgian calligrapher of the 9th century.

He created his works in Shatberdi monastery of Tao-Klarjeti which was built by Gregory of Khandzta during the reign of Bagrat I of Iberia. In 897 Mikaeli with the request of Soprom Shatberdeli re-wrote Adysh Gospels which is kept in Historical-Ethnographical Museum of Svaneti, in Mestia. It was written on parchment.
