= Dr. Love (artist) =

Dr. Love (born in 1985 as Bacha Khoperia) is a Georgian street/graffiti artist based in Tbilisi. Dr. Love mostly creates multi-layer, full color stencil graffiti, textual murals and street installations, basing his motives on pop-cultural references of humor or critical context. Most of his graffiti paintings are in Tbilisi and so far he is the author of the biggest graffiti in Georgia, that is located in Batumi. Dr. Love participated in Upfest, Europe's largest street art festival in the United Kingdom where his graffiti painting now occupies one of Bristol's walls. He was also present at the "Global street art show" held in Germany. His first ever graffiti was dedicated to Irakli Charkviani. Besides being graffiti artist he is a programmer and musician.
