= Irakly Shanidze =

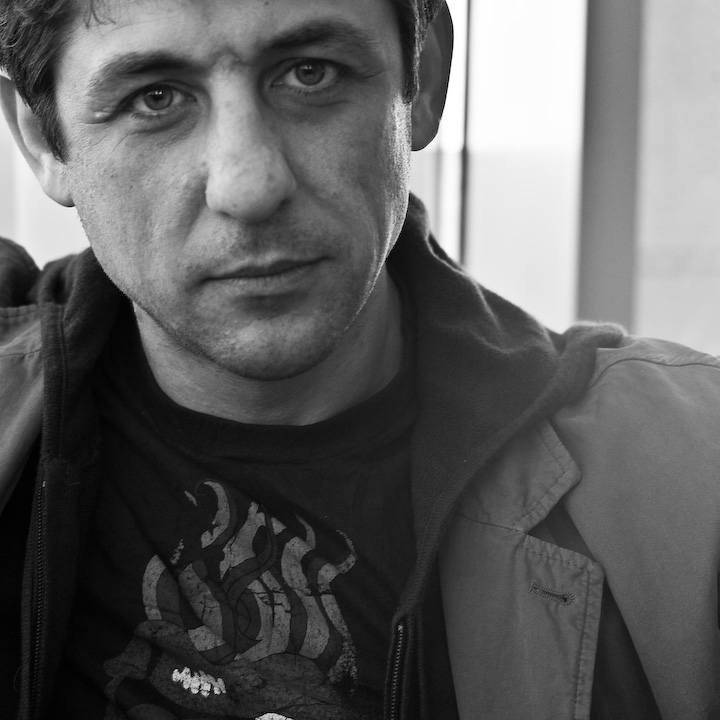
- Born: Irakly Shanidze; October 18, 1968 (age 58); Tbilisi, Georgia
- Education: Moscow State University; University of Michigan
- Known for: Photography
- Website: www.shanidze.com

Irakly Shanidze (born October 18, 1968) is a creative director and an advertising, fashion, and portrait photographer.

== Biography ==
Shanidze was born in Tbilisi in 1968. He graduated from Moscow State University with an MS in chemical enzymology. In 1993, he moved to Detroit, Michigan, USA, where he pursued a PhD in pharmacology/molecular biology at Wayne State University and then MPH/MHSA at the University of Michigan, School of Public Health. Concurrently he studied at New York Institute of Photography, graduating in 2000.

At the age of 12 Shanidze received a pre-war Reflex Korelle from his grandfather as a gift. While studying at Moscow State University he contributed to the university newspaper Вестник Московского Университета ("Moscow University Bulletin"). When on a military duty (1987–1989), he held the position of staff photojournalist at a regional military newspaper "Слава Родины" ("Motherland's Glory").

In 2000, Shanidze opened a photo studio in Detroit. In 2004, he partnered with Pavel Kiselev to open the International Academy of Photographic Arts. In 2004–2007, he was commissioned by a mime theater "Лицедеи".

Shanidze's photos have been shown at the State Exhibition Center Manezh, St. Petersburg, and at the Museum of Russian Art, Jersey City, New Jersey.

His professional advertising projects vary between the 'straight' (though rarely totally so) style of well-lit and executed studio work and his subversive and symbolic style, sometimes involving complex pseudo-real setups intended to convey the spontaneity and style of street life. As an advertising photographer, he has worked for Japan Tobacco International, Lexar Microsystems, Inc., and Leica Camera AG.

Much of his personal work is 'street,' though not classical street photography in that he places emphasis on the imagined and the surreal. Whether it is a series of images in which strangers on the subway gradually emerge as though spies, or individual images in which found scenes take on allegorical overtones as a result of the manner in which their elements are juxtaposed. Whether subtly mocking a classical painting or using strongly symbolic elements, Shanidze invites the viewer to subvert their own views of the real in the process of decoding the surreal.

Shanidze has exhibited his work in personal and group shows in the US, Canada and Russia.

Recently his interest shifted to the visual representation of classical ballet. He has been working with current and former performers of American Ballet Theatre, Mariinsky Theatre, Opéra de Monte-Carlo, and Bolshoy Theatre. He is a visiting professor at Moscow Academy of Photography where he teaches the artistic side of photography online. He also holds seminars and workshops across the US and Europe.

He lives and works in Detroit, Michigan, USA.

== Awards ==
- 2006: Sony International Contest "Like. No. Other.", Special prize for the most original work
- 2007: Professional Nomination, B&W Spider Awards
- 2007: Photograph of the year 2007, category photo d'art, agence ArtIndex, Saint Petersburg.
- 2008: SPJ Excellence Award, First Prize
- 2009: Best Photographer, Real Detroit Weekly Readers Poll, 2009
- 2009: Leica Fotografie International Editor's Choice Award
- 2010: Professional Nomination, B&W Spider Awards
- 2011: Best Local Photographer, Real Detroit Weekly Readers Poll, 2011
- 2011: Trierenberg Super Circuit, gold medal portrait category, 2011
- 2014: Премия "Лучший фотограф". Шорт-лист номинации "Концептуальная фотография"

== Shows ==
- 2003 Chaplin Club, St. Petersburg, Russia; show «Fine Play» 10/2003
- 2007 Panhorama Gallery, Tempere, Finland; personal show 5/2007
- 2007 Фестиваль современной фотографии, Центр Современного Искусства «Винзавод», Москва, Россия; featured artist, 5/2007
- 2007 Univers d’Artistes; featured artist, 11/2007
- 2007 Fotoloft, Moscow, Russia; permanent collection show 11/2007
- 2008 Dirty Show Detroit; special quest artist, 2/2008
- 2008 Fotoloft, Moscow, Russia; featured artist for the first issue of Portfolio Magazine, 6/2008
- 2008 International Photo Festival in Estremos, Portugal; куратор, 9/2008
- 2008 Leica Fotografie International Magazine, Leica Master Shots permanent collection, 9/2008
- 2008 Free Range Photo; 9/2008
- 2009 Human. Circles of Life. Exhibition Hall Manezh, St Petersburg, Russia, 8/2009
- 2010 Personal show «М8Ж», Leica-center «Яркий Мир», St Petersburg, Russia, 5/2010
- 2010 Photo exhibition to benefit the Museum of Russian Art (MORA) July 20–30, 2010
- 2010 Invito Alle Nozze, Personal Show / Fotoloft / Art-Moscow, Moscow, Russia, 9-10/2010
- 2011 River Edge Gallery, Wyandotte MI USA, 1/2011
- 2011 PhotoVoice Auction 2011 Preview Exhibition 11/2011
- 2011 Dirty Show Detroit; special guest artist; 2/2011
- 2014 Империя абсурда; Khabarovsk 6/2014

== Gallery ==
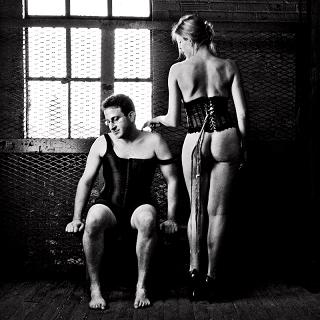
Couple

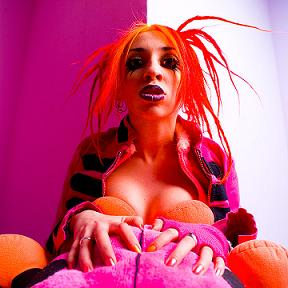
Girl 1

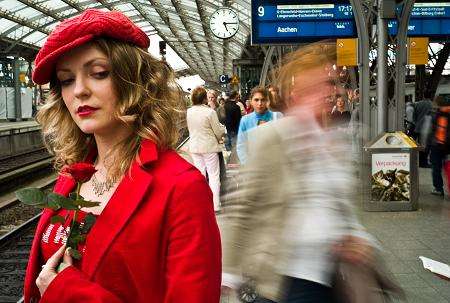
Girl 2

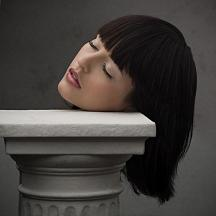
Head

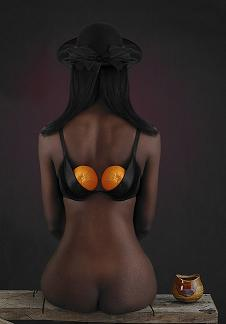
Leslie

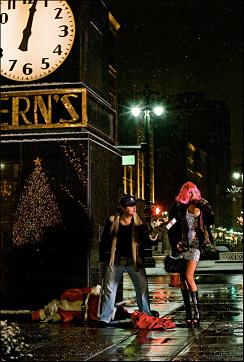
Santa robbery
