= Zurab Nadareishvili =

Georgian composer and academic

Zurab Nadareishvili (Georgian: ზურაბ ნადარეიშვილი; born 4 January 1957) is a Georgian composer and academic.

Chiefly known as a composer of chamber music, he is a notable representative of the generation of Georgian composers that arose in the 1980s.

== Biography ==
Nadareishvili was born in Poti, Georgia, where he went to primary and music school. From 1973 to 1978 he studied at the Georgian Polytechnic Institute (power engineering faculty); after that he resumed music lessons and in 1982 entered Tbilisi State Conservatoire, composition class. During the studies at the conservatoire he participated in students' music festivals in Georgia, as well as other countries.

In 1987 he graduated from the conservatoire (Prof. Kvernadze's class) and continued post-graduate study again under his guidance.

In 1987 his String Quartet was awarded a First Prize at the Moscow All-Union Competition. After that it was successfully performed in Saint Petersburg, Warsaw, Amsterdam and USA by the Petersburg String Quartet.

Zurab Nadareishvili is a member of the Georgian Composers’ Union. In 1996 he became a board member of the Georgian Composers’ Union.

In 1995 he was awarded first prize by the Georgian Composers’ Union for the year's best creation (Piano Trio).

In 1997 his "Variations for piano and orchestra" was awarded a III Prize at the Moscow Prokofiev International Competition.

At present he is a professor at Tbilisi State Conservatoire, where he teaches composition. He is also a musical editor of "KVALI" Film Studio.

In 1985 he married the physicist Nino Shavdia (born in 1963).They have two children (Nutza, born 1986; Georgi, born 1987).

== Works ==
- Pieces for piano (performed in Tbilisi 1982);
- Three romances for voice and piano (performed in Tbilisi 1982);
- Sonata for violin and piano (performed in Tbilisi 1983);
- Piece for clarinet and piano (performed in Tbilisi 1983);
- Variations for piano (performed in Tbilisi 1983);
- Four pieces for string quartet (performed in Tbilisi 1984);
- Music for 13 strings;
- Brass quintet (recorded by Georgian Radio 1985);
- String quartet N 1 (performed in Tbilisi 1987 by Georgian Radio String Quartet in Petersburg 1989, in Amsterdam 1995, in USA 1996, by Petersburg String Quartet);
- Symphonic poem (performed in Tbilisi 1988, in Gorky (Russia) 1988);
- Piano quintet N 1 (performed in Tbilisi 1989, in USA 1995/97, in Osaka (Japan) 1999);
- Piano trio (performed in Tbilisi 1994, in USA 2003);
- Variations for piano and orchestra (performed in Tbilisi 1998);
- "Aphaniptera and formicidae" - chamber opera, based on a Georgian folk-tale (recorded by “Kvali” Film Studio, Tbilisi 1996);
- "Chants" - for nine instruments (recorded by Georgian Radio 1993);
- "Mon Plaisir" - for six instruments (performed in Tbilisi 2000);
- "Rhapsody" - for guitar and string quartet (performed in USA 2003);
- String Quartet No 2 (2002);
- "Dance" - for flute, clarinet, vibraphone and guitar (performed in Baku 2003);
- "Litany" (2003) for strings, percussions and tape (performed in Tbilisi 2012);
- Piano quintet No 2 (2005) (performed in Osaka (Japan) 1999);
- "Phoenix" – for piano, string quartet and tape (2005);
- "Pastorale" – for recorder, flute, oboe, soprano saxophone and harpsichord (2005);
- "Nuages" – for Orchestra(2006). Performed in Tbilisi (2012);
- "Dialogue-Contrasts" - for flute, string trio, piano and tape (2007). Performed in Tbilisi and in Fribourg by Ensemble "Recherche" (2007);
- "Rendezvous" – for oboe solo. Performed in Tbilisi (2010);
- "Cadenza" – for viola solo. Performed in Tbilisi (2010); performed in USA in 2010 and 2011
- 2 movements – for oboe, clarinet, bassoon and piano. Performed in USA (2010);
- Etude (Tarantella) – for piano. Performed in USA (2010);
- "Life is a dream" – 2-act Opera on own libretto (2000–20014);
- "Pot-pourri" – for 3 pianos and 16 hands (2014). Performed in Tbilisi (2014);
- Incidental music for plays and films.
