= Culture of Georgia (country) =

The culture of Georgia has evolved over the country's long history, providing it with a unique national identity and a strong literary tradition based on the Georgian language and alphabet. This strong sense of national identity has helped to preserve Georgian distinctiveness despite repeated periods of foreign occupation.

== Culture of Ancient and Old Georgia ==
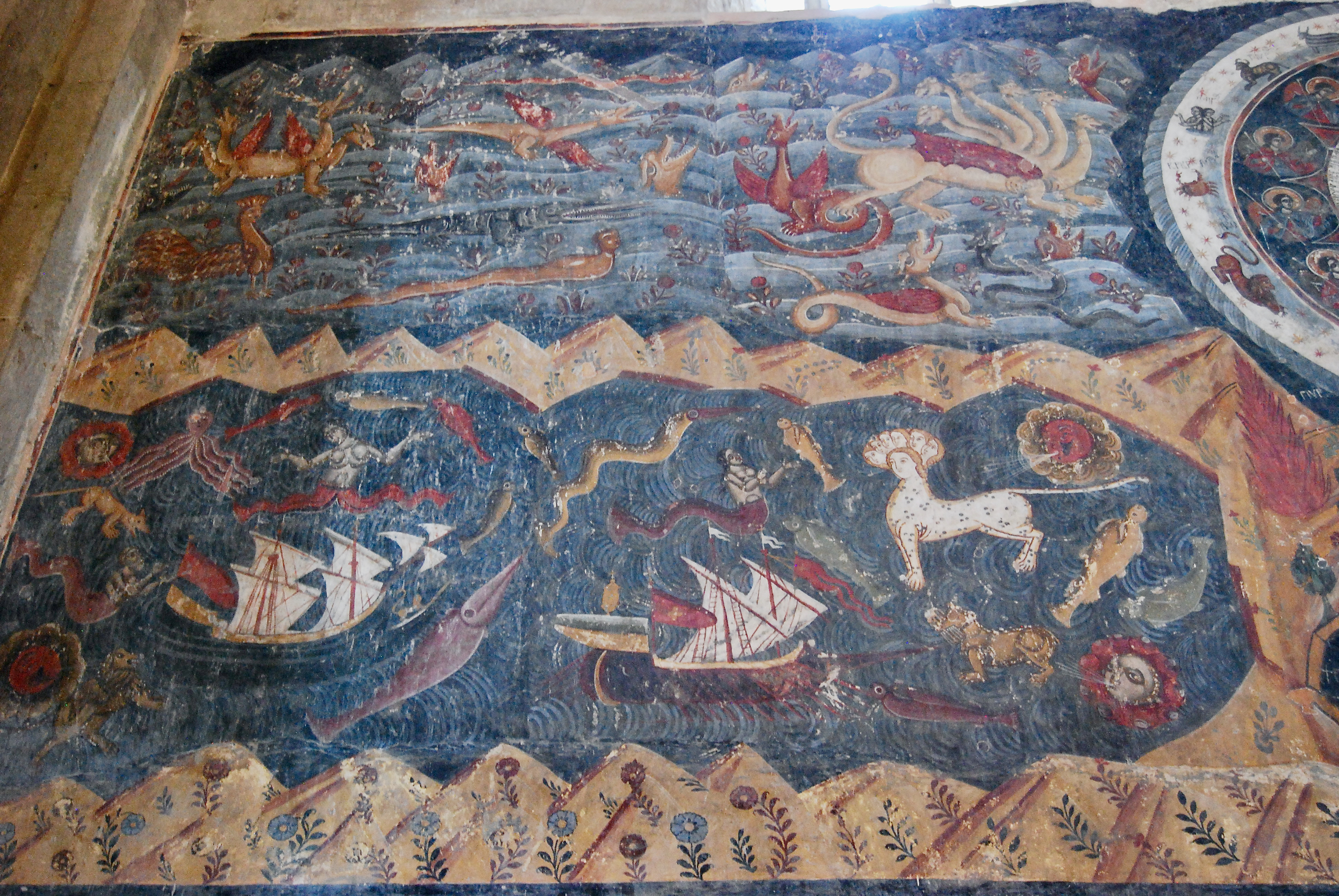
Frescoes from the Svetitskhoveli Cathedral, an example of Georgian medieval art depicting ships and monsters at sea.

The Georgian alphabet is traditionally said to have been invented in the 3rd century BC and reformed by King Parnavaz I of Iberia in 284 BC. Most modern scholarship puts its origin date at some time in the 5th century AD, when the earliest examples can be found.

Georgia's medieval culture was greatly influenced by Eastern Orthodox Christianity and the Georgian Orthodox and Apostolic Church, which promoted and often sponsored the creation of many works of religious devotion. These included churches and monasteries, works of art such as icons, and hagiographies of Georgian saints. In addition, many secular works of national history, mythology, and hagiography were also written.

=== Ecclesiastical art ===
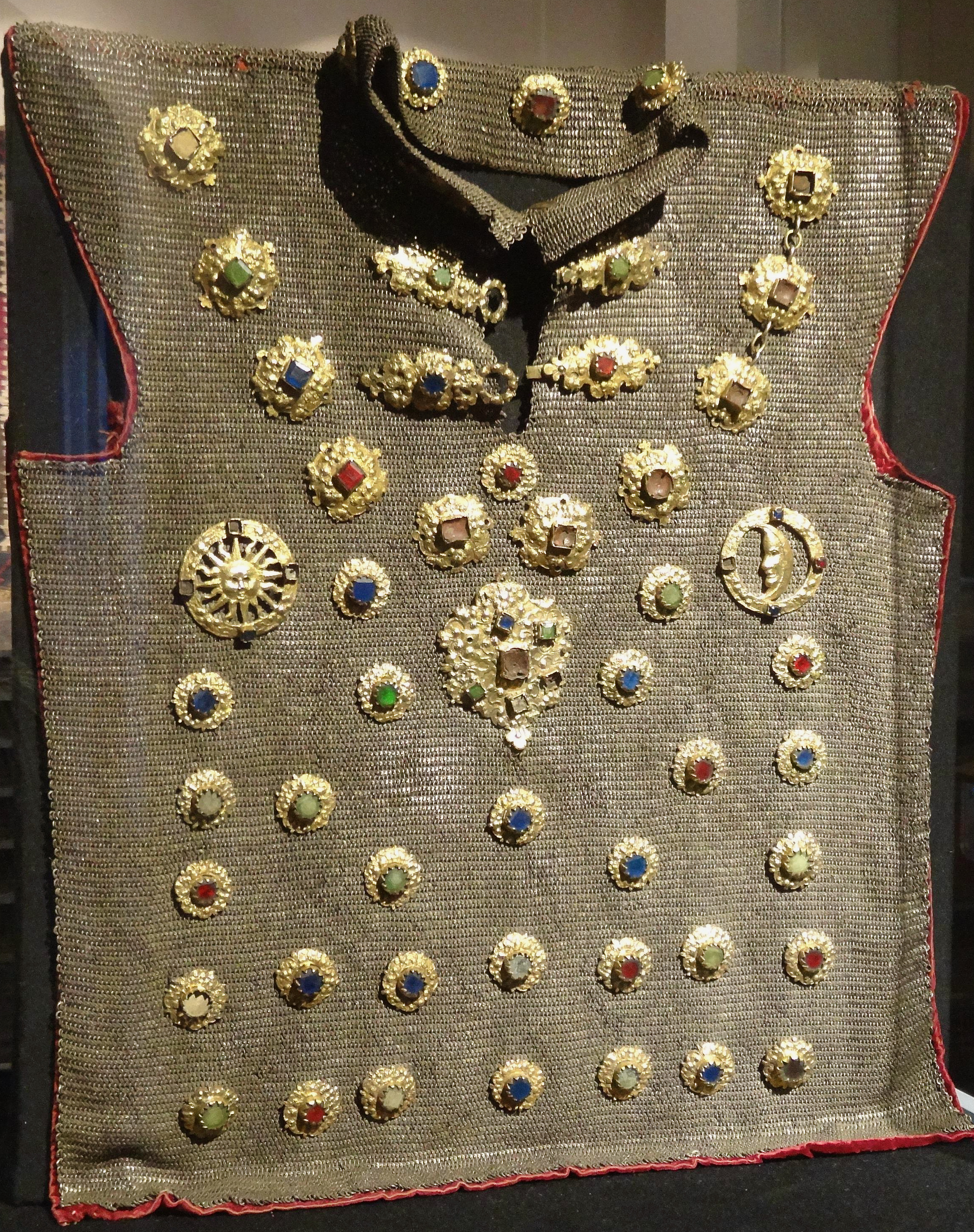
Georgian parade armour with golden plates

Medieval Georgian icons are renowned as being among the finest creations of Orthodox religious art. Notable examples include:

- The Icon of 886 from Zarzma monastery
- The Icon of the 9th century from Tsilkani
- The famous Wonderworking Iberian Icon of the Mother of God (10th century)
- The Icon of the 10th century from Okona
- The Icon of Our Lady of Khakhuli of the 12th century
- The Icon of St. George of the 11th century from Labechina
- The Icon of St. George of the 11th century from Nakipari
- The Icon of the 12th century from Anchiskhati
- The Icon of the 14th century from Ubisa
- The Icon of the 16th century from Alaverdi

=== Ecclesiastical monuments ===
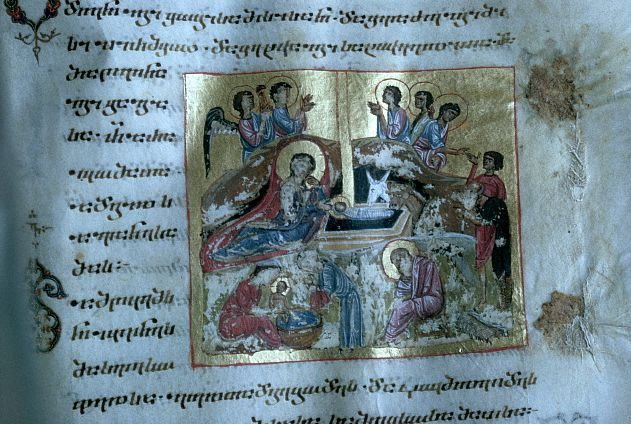
A page from a 12th-century Gelati Gospel, an example of Georgian illuminated manuscripts from the Middle Ages

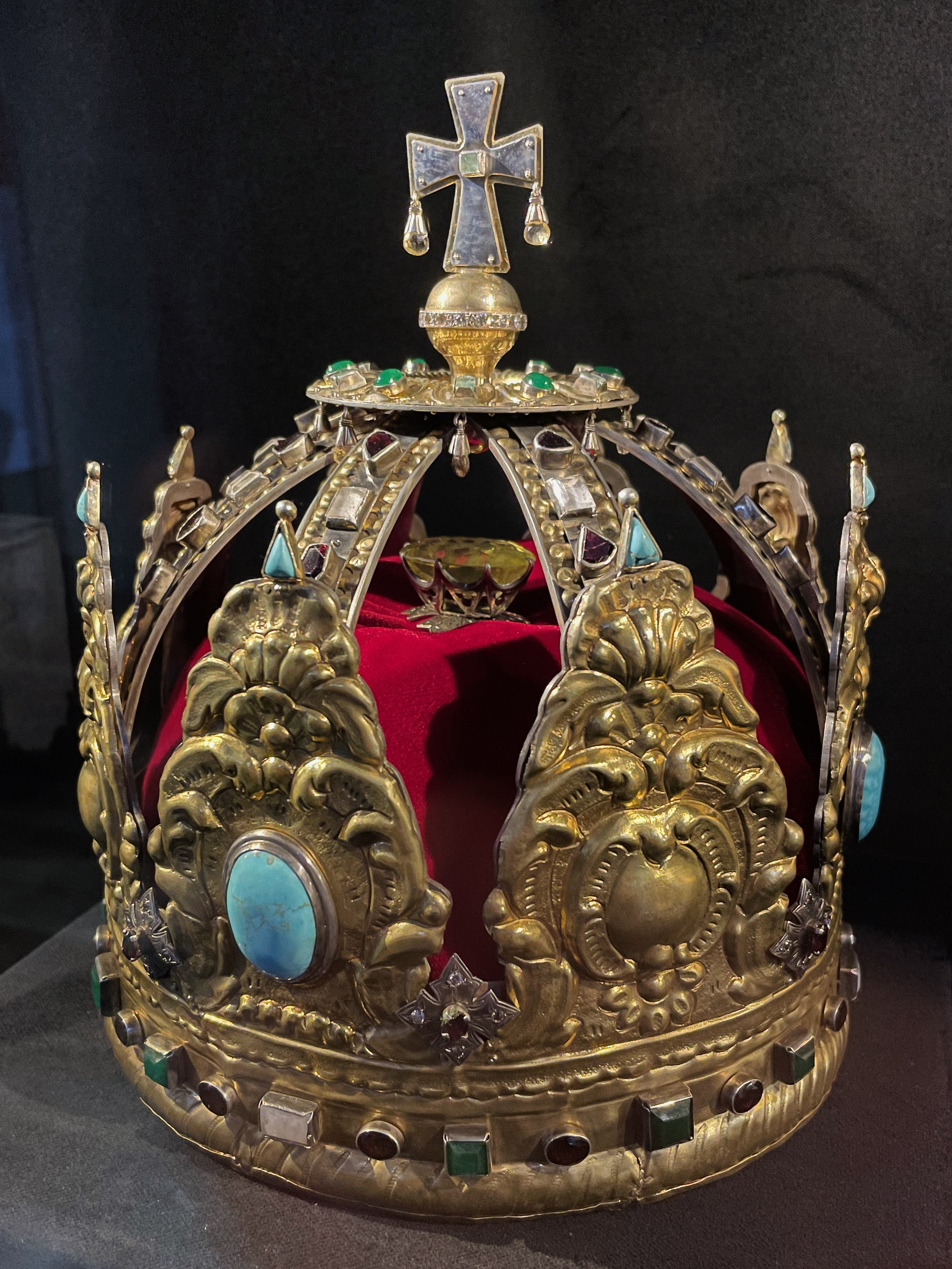
Ceremonial crown of the Georgian high nobility, an example of metalwork from the early modern period

Well-known monuments of Georgian Christian architecture include:

- The Georgian Church in Bethlehem (4th century)
- The Church of Gavazi (4th century) in Akhalsopeli (Kvareli district of Kakheti region)
- Akaurta Church (5th century) in Bolnisi district (Kvemo Kartli region)
- Ikalto Monastery complex (5th-7th centuries) (Kakheti)
- Sioni Church (5th century) in Bolnisi
- Monastery of Shio Mghvime (6th century)
- Davidgareja Monastery complex (6th-7th centuries)
- Jvari Monastery in Mtskheta (6th century)
- Anchiskhati Church (6th century) in Tbilisi
- Nekresi Monastery Complex (4th-9th centuries) in Kakheti
- Sioni church (7th century) in Ateni
- Petritsoni Monastery in Bulgaria (11th century)
- The Georgian Monastery (10th century) on the Black Mountain in Syria (now territory of Turkey)
- The Georgian Iveron Monastery on Athos (10th century)
- Svetitskhoveli Cathedral in Mtskheta (11th century)
- Opiza Monastery (10th century) in Tao-Klarjeti (now territory of Turkey)
- Monastery Doliskana (10th century) in Tao-Klarjeti (now territory of Turkey)
- Monastery Otkhta-Eklesia in Tao-Klarjeti (now territory of Turkey)
- Oshki Monastery (10th century) in Tao-Klarjeti (now territory of Turkey)
- Bagrati Cathedral (11th century) in Kutaisi
- Gelati Monastery (11th century) in Kutaisi
- Motsameta monastery (11th century) in Imereti
- Tbilisi Sioni Cathedral (11th century) in Tbilisi
- Alaverdi Monastery (11th century) in Kakheti
- Samtavro Monastery (12th century) in Mtskheta
- Vardzia Monastery (12th century) in Meskheti
- Gialia Monastery (10th-16th centuries) in Cyprus

Well-known Georgian painters were Damiane (13th century), Anania (15th century), Mamuka Tavakarashvili (17th century), etc.

The works of the famous Georgian goldsmiths, Beka and Beshken Opizari (11th century), are outstanding contributions to world art.

=== Gospels ===
- Opiza Gospels (9th century)
- Anbandidi Gospels (9th century)
- Adysh Gospels (9th century)
- Berti Gospels (10th century)
- Tbeti I Gospels (10th century)
- Jruchi I Gospels (10th century)
- Tskarostavi I Gospels (10th century)
- Parkhali I Gospels (10th century)
- Parkhali II Gospels (10th-11th centuries)
- Alaverdi Gospels (11th century)
- Martvili Gospels (11th century)
- Tbeti II Gospels (12th century)
- Bichvinta Gospels (12th century)
- Gelati Gospels (12th century)
- Vani Gospels (12th century)
- Jruchi II Gospels (12th century)
- Tskarostavi II Gospels (12th century)
- Vardzia Gospels (12th-13th centuries)
- Jerusalem Gospels (12th-13th centuries)
- Ienashi Gospels (13th century)
- Mokvi Gospels (13th century)

=== Literary and other written works ===
A miniature from the 1824 manuscript of Amiran-Darejaniani copied by David Tumanov (H-384, National Center of Manuscripts).

Important Georgian literary works of the pre-Christian period are:

- Amiraniani, ancient Georgian folk epos (see also: Amiran-Darejaniani and Amirani).

Notable Georgian written works from the medieval period include:

- Martyrdom of the Holy Queen Shushanik by Iakob Tsurtaveli (the oldest surviving work of the Georgian literature written between 476 and 483)
- Corpus Areopagiticum, a philosophical and theological work attributed by some to Peter the Iberian (5th century)
- The Life of Saint Nino (8th century) (anon)
- The Martyrdom of Abo Tbileli by Ioane Sabanisdze (8th century)
- The Life of Grigol Khandzteli by Giorgi Merchule (10th century)
- A History of the Georgian Kings ("Tskhovreba Kartvelta Mepeta") by Leonti Mroveli (11th century)
- A History of the Royal House of Bagrationi by Sumbat Davitisdze (11th century)
- Eteriani, a folk epic (c. 11th century)
- Life of the King Farnavaz (anon) (11th century)
- Ustsoro Karabadini (Peerless Karabadini) (11th century)
- Tamariani by Ioane Chakhrukhadze (12th century)
- Shen Khar Venakhi ("Thou Art a Vineyard"), the famous Georgian hymn by the King Demetre I Bagrationi (12th century)
- Vepkhistkaosani (The Knight in the Panther's Skin), a national epic poem by Shota Rustaveli (12th century)
- Abdulmesiani by Ioane Shavteli (13th century)
- Kartlis Tskhovreba (History of Georgia), a collection of old Georgian chronicles (from ancient times to the 14th century)

== Georgian culture throughout history ==
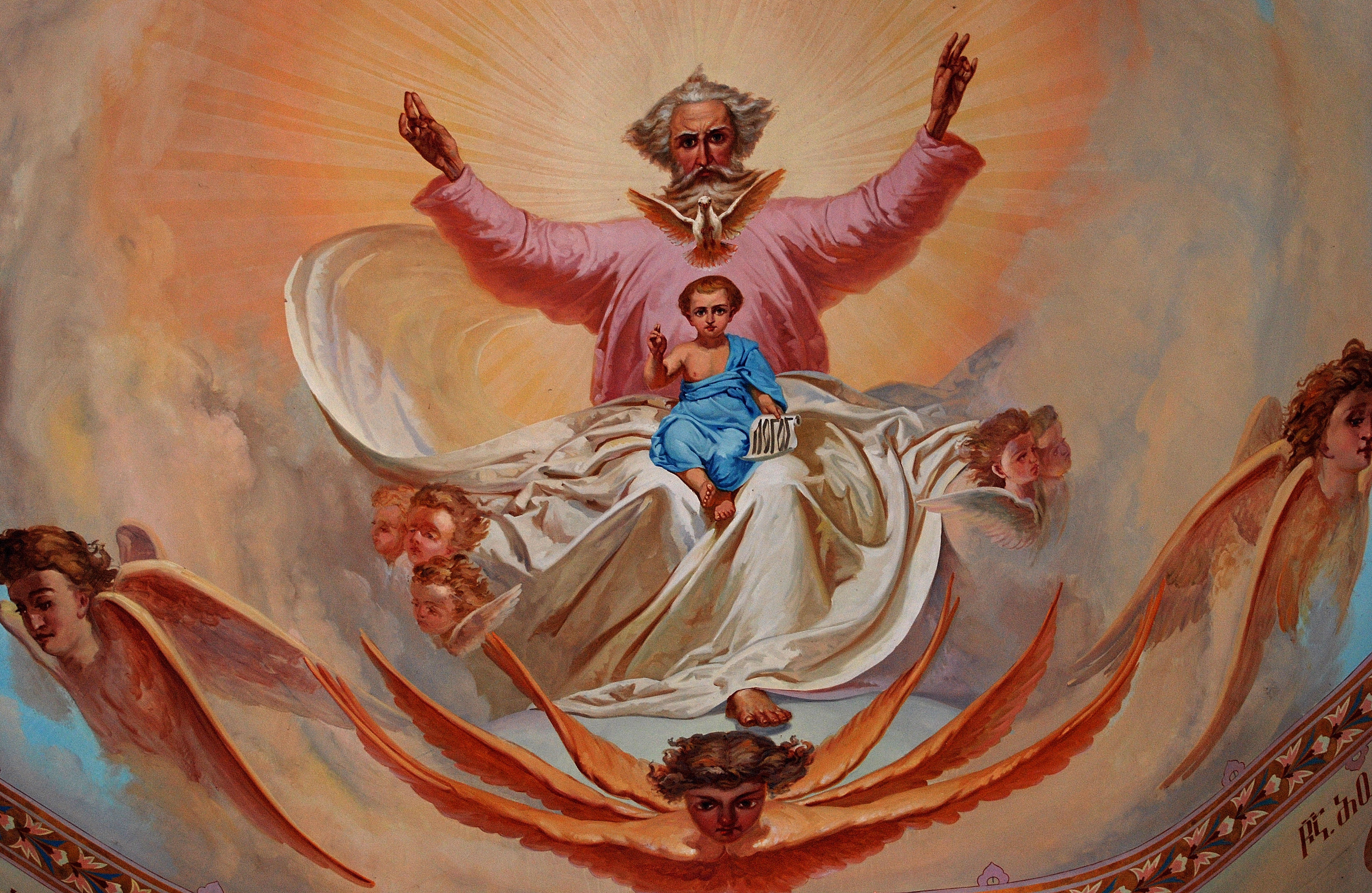
Wall Painting in Georgia's ancient monastery, Shio-Mghvime

Georgian culture enjoyed a renaissance of classical literature, arts, philosophy, architecture and science in the 11th century. Over the course of centuries, to varying degrees it was influenced by Classical Greece, the Roman Empire, the Byzantine Empire, various Persian empires (e.g. Achaemenid, Sassanian, and Safavid), the Russian Empire and the Soviet Union.

This long history has provided a national narrative which encompasses the successful preservation of unique culture and identity in a consistent territory, despite powerful external pressures from different directions. Christianity and the Georgian language are particularly important national identifiers.

The first Georgian-language printing house was established in the 1620s in Italy, and the first one in Georgia itself was founded in 1709 in Tbilisi.

Georgian theatre has a long history; its oldest national form was the "Sakhioba" (extant from the 3rd century BC to the 17th century AD). The Georgian National Theatre was founded in 1791 in Tbilisi, by the writer, dramatist, and diplomat Giorgi Avalishvili (1769–1850). Its leading actors were Dimitri Aleksi-Meskhishvili, David Machabeli, David Bagrationi, Dimitri Cholokashvili, and others.

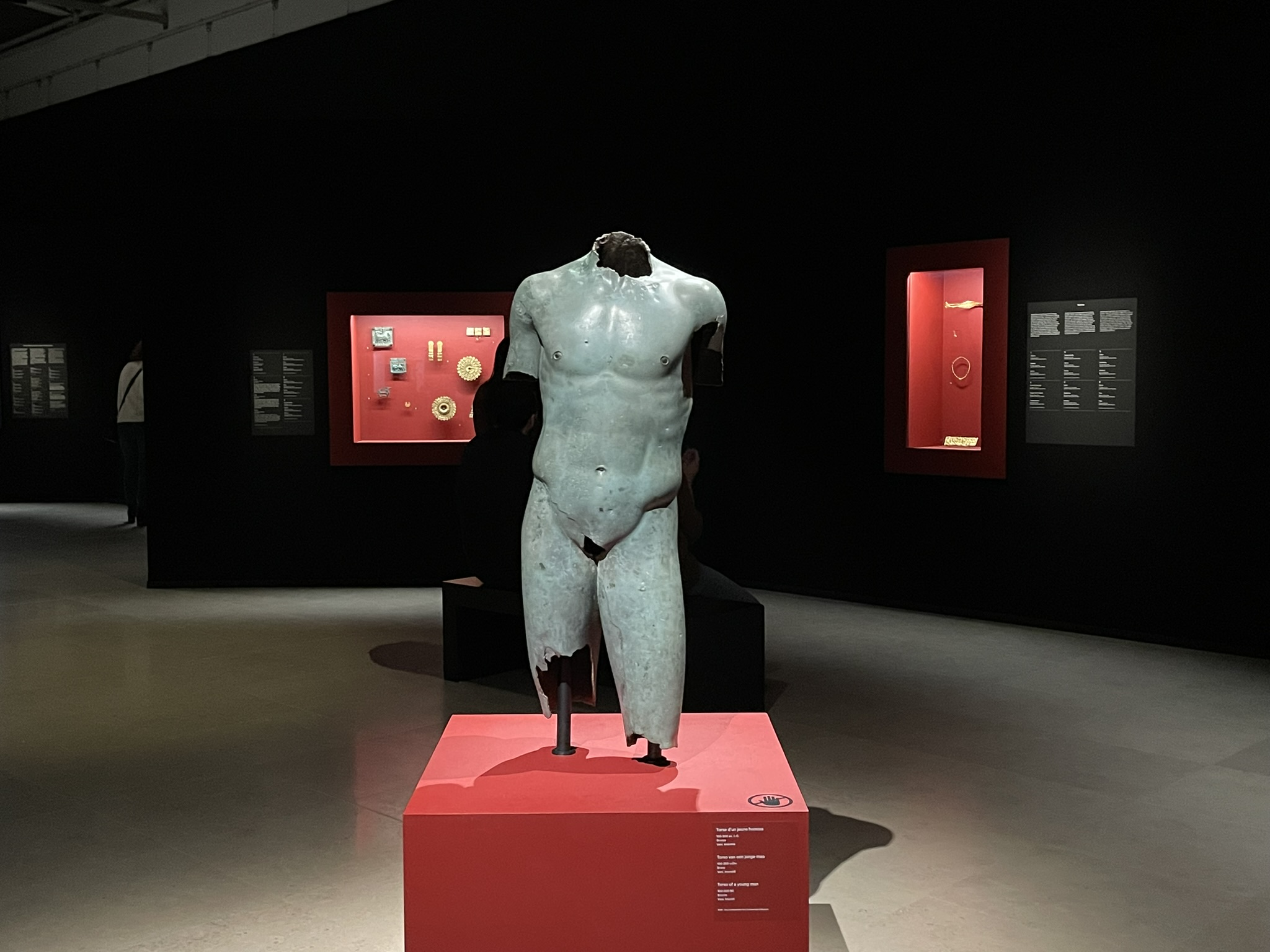
2nd century BC bronze torso from Western Georgia, displayed at the Georgian National Museum

In Tbilisi, the Museum of the Caucasus was founded in 1845. In the 1920s, it became the State Museum of Georgia. The Tbilisi State Theatre of Opera and Ballet was established in 1851.

Greatest representatives of Georgian culture of the 19th century were: Nikoloz Baratashvili (poet), Alexander Orbeliani (writer), Vakhtang Orbeliani (poet), Dimitri Kipiani (writer), Grigol Orbeliani (poet), Ilia Chavchavadze (writer and poet), Akaki Tsereteli (poet), Alexander Kazbegi (writer), Rapiel Eristavi (poet), Mamia Gurieli (poet), Iakob Gogebashvili (writer), Simon Gugunava (poet), Babo Avalishvili-Kherkheulidze (actor), Nikoloz Avalishvili (actor), Nikoloz Aleksi-Meskhishvili (actor), Romanoz Gvelesiani (painter), Grigol Maisuradze (painter), Alexandre Beridze (painter), Ivane Machabeli (translator), Okropir Bagrationi (translator), Sardion Aleksi-Meskhishvili (translator), Kharlampi Savaneli (opera singer), Pilimon Koridze (opera singer), Lado Agniashvili (folk singer), Alois Mizandary (composer), etc.

The first cinema in Georgia was established in Tbilisi on November 16, 1896. The first Georgian cinema documentary ("Journey of Akaki Tsereteli in Racha-Lechkhumi") was shot in 1912 by Vasil Amashukeli (1886–1977), while the first Georgian feature film ("Kristine") was shot in 1916 by Alexandre Tsutsunava (1881–1955).

The Tbilisi State Academy of Arts was founded in 1917.

Georgian culture suffered under the rule of the Soviet Union during the 20th century, during which a policy of Russification was imposed but was strongly resisted by many Georgians. Since the independence of Georgia in 1991, a cultural resurgence has taken place, albeit somewhat hampered by the country's economic and political difficulties in the post-Soviet era.

== Cuisine ==
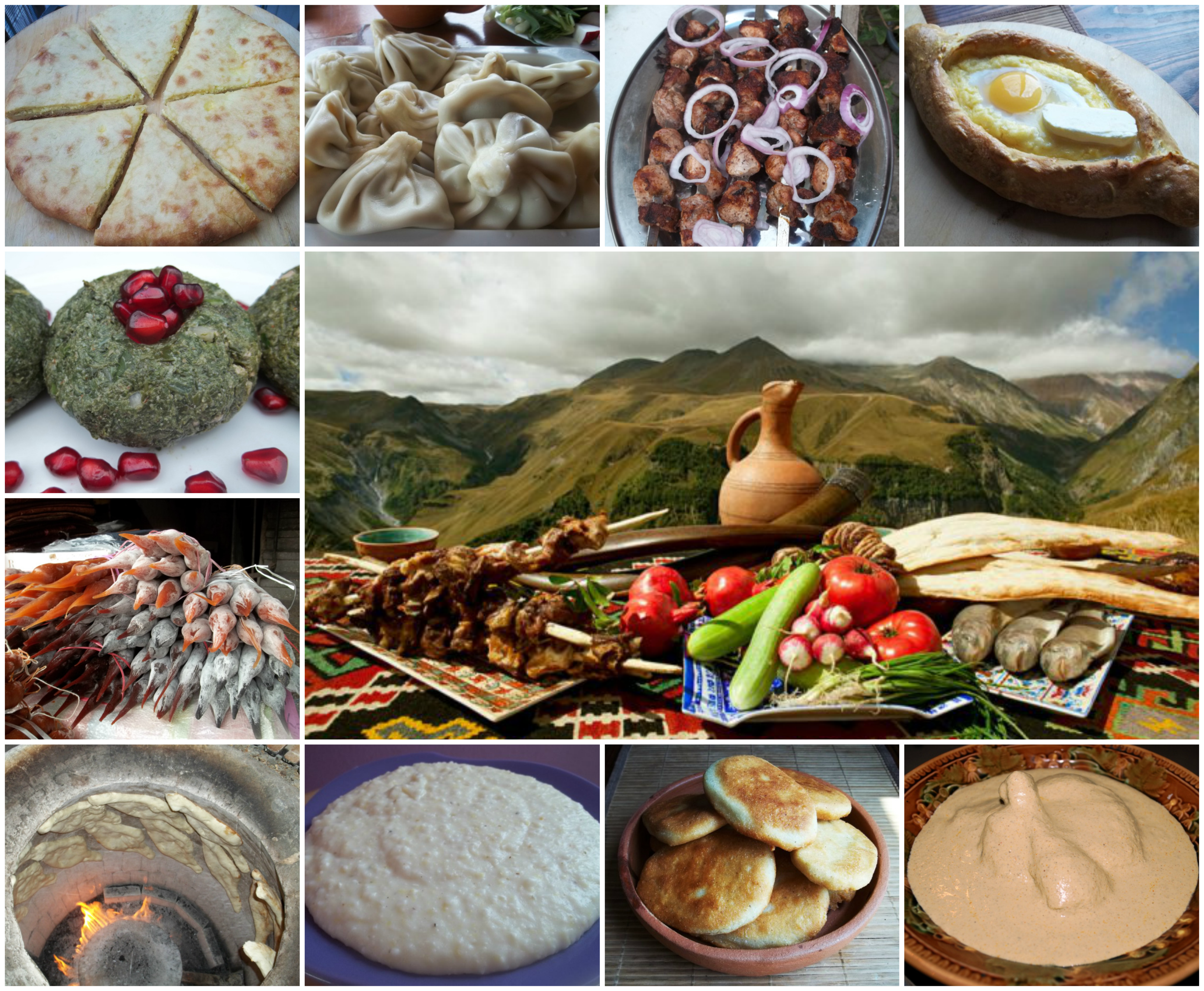
Georgian cuisine collage

The Georgian cuisine is unique to the country, but also carries some influences from other Caucasian, Eastern European and nearby Middle Eastern culinary traditions. Each historical province of Georgia has its own distinct culinary tradition, with variations such as Abkhazian, Megrelian, Kakhetian, Imeretian, Svanetian, Pshavian, Tushian, Kartlian, Gurian, Meskhian, Rachian and Adjarian cuisines. Rich with meat dishes, the Georgian cuisine also offers a variety of vegetarian dishes.

Georgian cuisine is the result of the broad interplay of culinary ideas carried along the Silk Road Trade route by merchants and travelers alike. The importance of both food and drink to Georgian culture is best observed during a feast called supra, when a huge assortment of dishes are prepared, always accompanied by large amounts of local wine, known to be one of the world's oldest wines, produced in ancient authentic Georgian underground kvevri clay pots (dating 8 century BC). In a Georgian feast, the role of the tamada (toastmaster) is an important and honoured position.

== Famous Georgian cultural figures ==
Some famous Georgian cultural figures from the 20th–21st centuries are:

=== Actors ===
- David "Dodo" Abashidze
- Veriko Anjaparidze
- Spartak Bagashvili
- Givi Berikashvili
- Ramaz Chkhikvadze
- Kakhi Kavsadze
- Ipolite Khvichia
- Akaki Khorava
- Zurab Kipshidze
- Avtandil Makharadze
- Merab Ninidze
- Guram Sagaradze
- Karlo Sakandelidze
- Sesilia Takaishvili
- Bukhuti Zakariadze
- Sergo Zakariadze
- Nato Vachnadze
- Sofiko Chiaureli

=== Ballet dancers ===
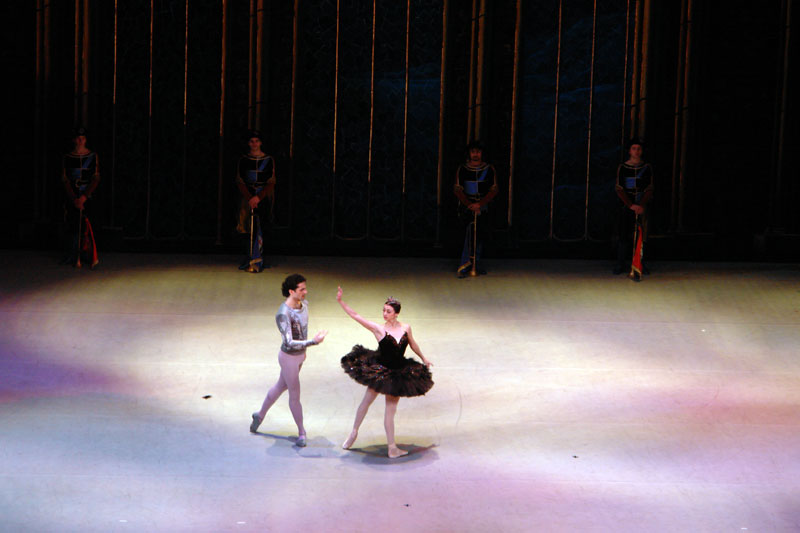
Nino Ananiashvili

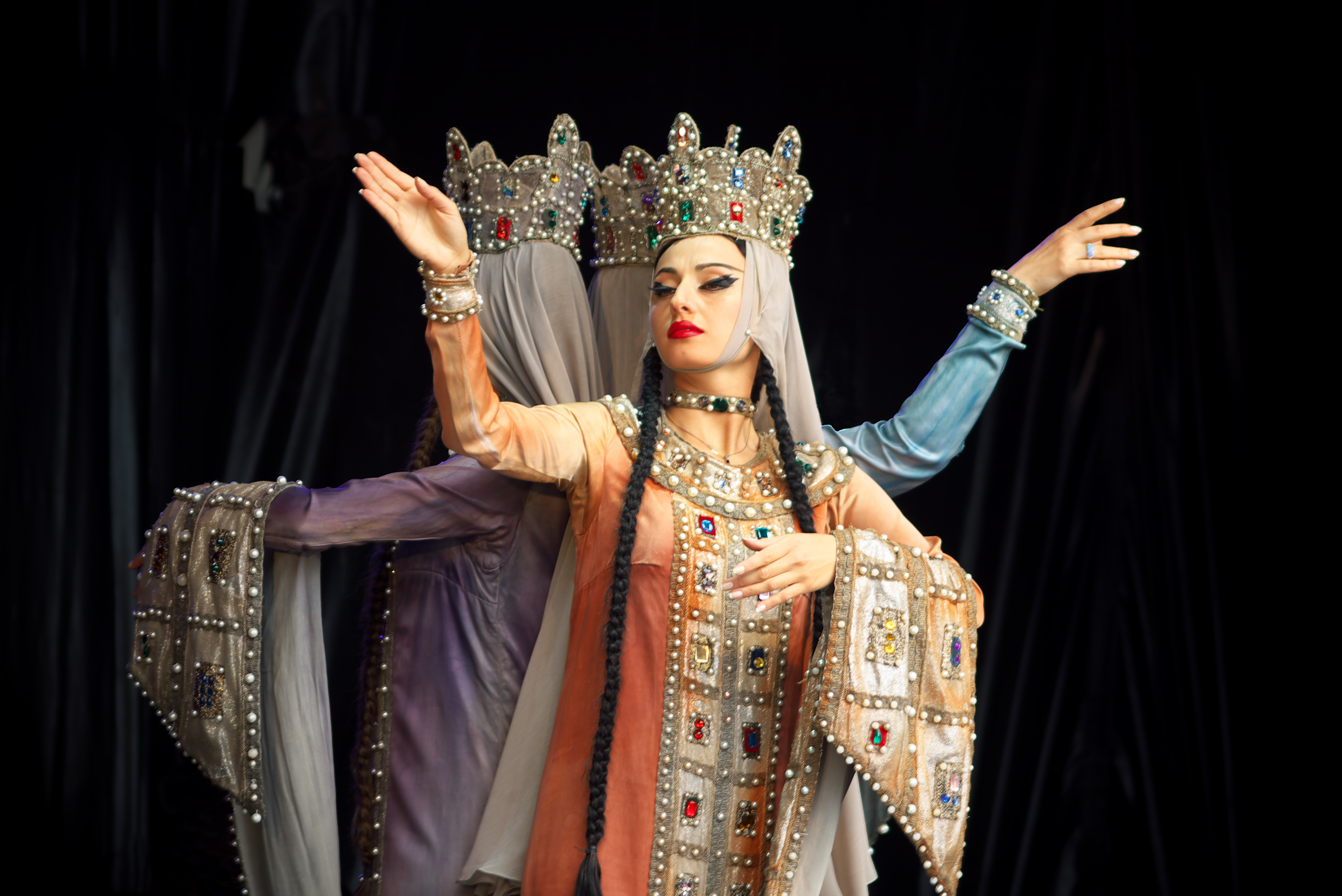
Georgian folk dance performed by Sukhishvili ensemble

- Nino Ananiashvili
- Vakhtang Chabukiani
- Irma Nioradze

=== Composers ===
- Giorgi Tsabadze
- Zakharia Paliashvili
- Gia Kancheli
- Sulkhan Tsintsadze
- Dimitri Arakishvili
- Andria Balanchivadze
- Meliton Balanchivadze
- Alexandre Basilaia
- Bidzina Kvernadze
- Otar Taktakishvili

=== Violinists ===
- Liana Isakadze
- Lisa Batiashvili

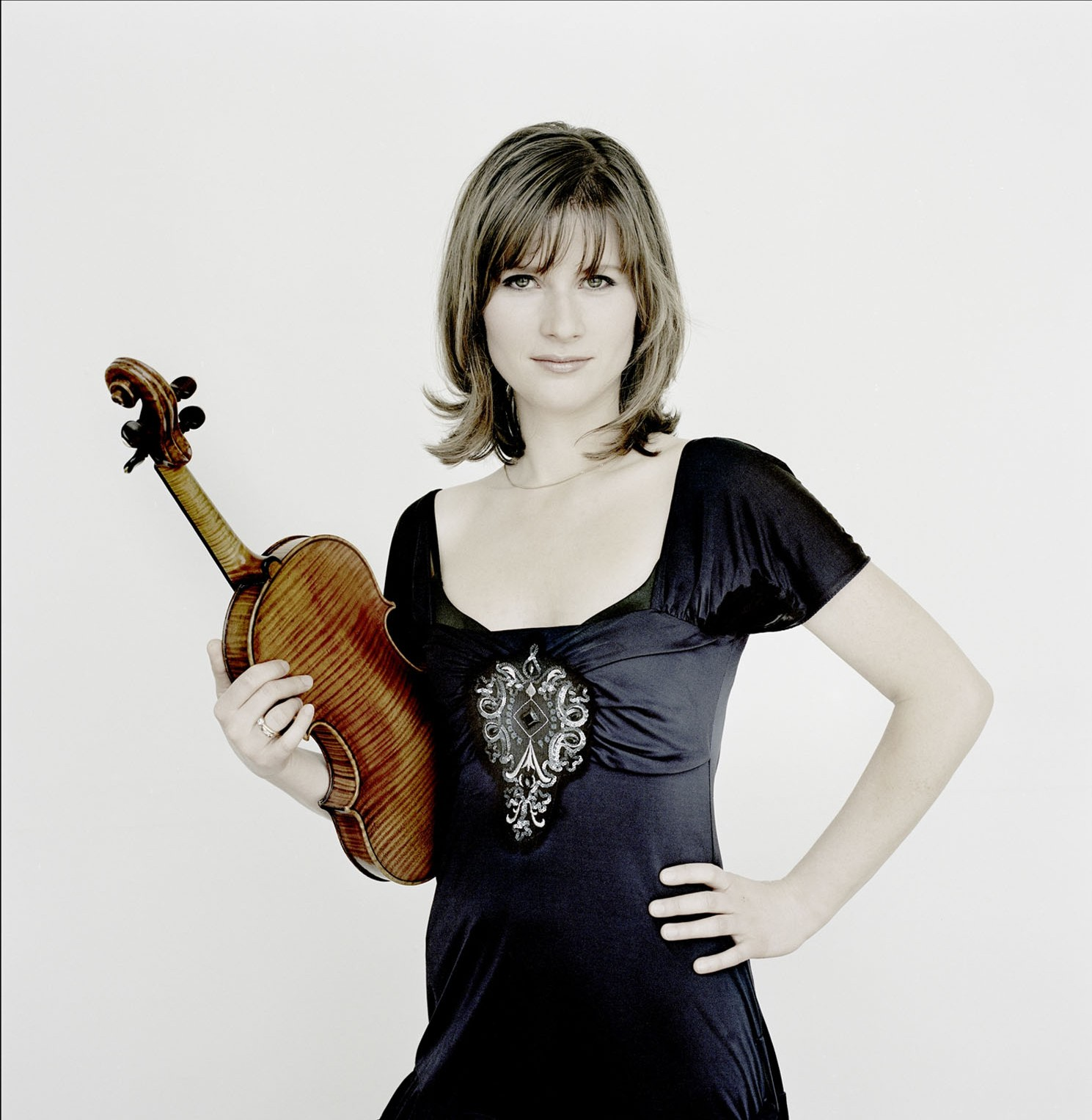
Lisa Batiashvili, leading Georgian violinist of her generation.

=== Filmmakers ===
- Tengiz Abuladze
- Vasil Amashukeli
- Mikheil Chiaureli
- Revaz Chkheidze
- Otar Ioseliani
- Mikheil Kobakhidze
- Eldar Shengelaia
- Giorgi Shengelaia
- Alexandre Tsutsunava
- Nana Mchedlidze

=== Opera singers ===
- Medea Amiranashvili
- Paata Burchuladze
- David Gamrekeli
- Lamara Cekonia
- Makvala Kasrashvili
- Badri Maisuradze
- Vano Sarajishvili
- Zurab Sotkilava
- Nino Surguladze

=== Painters ===
- Irakli Parjiani
- Elene Akhvlediani
- David Alexidze
- Gia Bugadze
- Amiran Danibegashvili
- Gigo Gabashvili
- Oleg Timchenko
- Petre Otskheli
- Lado Gudiashvili
- Gia Gugushvili
- Mamuka Japharidze
- Irakli Gamrekeli
- David Kakabadze
- Shalva Kikodze
- Sergo Kobuladze
- Niko Pirosmani
- Levan Tsutskiridze
- Avto Varazi

=== Pianists ===
- Alexander Korsantia
- Giorgi Latso
- Alexander Toradze
- Eliso Virsaladze
- Inga Kashakashvili
- Khatia Buniatishvili

=== Poets ===
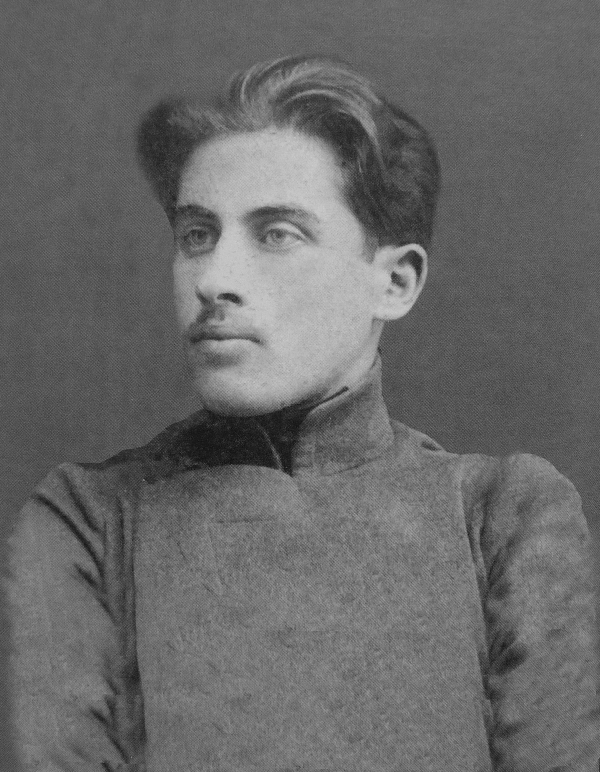
Titsian Tabidze, a Georgian poet persecuted by the Soviet authorities

- Shota Rustaveli
- Galaktion Tabidze
- Alexander Abasheli
- Rati Amaglobeli
- Lado Asatiani
- Valerian Gaprindashvili
- Terenti Graneli
- Ioseb Grishashvili
- Paolo Iashvili
- Ana Kalandadze
- Giorgi Leonidze
- Mukhran Machavariani
- David Magradze
- Kolau Nadiradze
- Vazha-Pshavela
- Titsian Tabidze
- Nikoloz Baratashvili
- Ilia Chavchavadze
- Akaki Tsereteli
- Bela Chekurishvili
- Elizabeth Orbeliani

=== Sculptors ===
- Elguja Amashukeli
- Iakob Nikoladze
- Irakli Ochiauri
- George Papashvily
- Zurab Tsereteli

=== Theatre producers ===
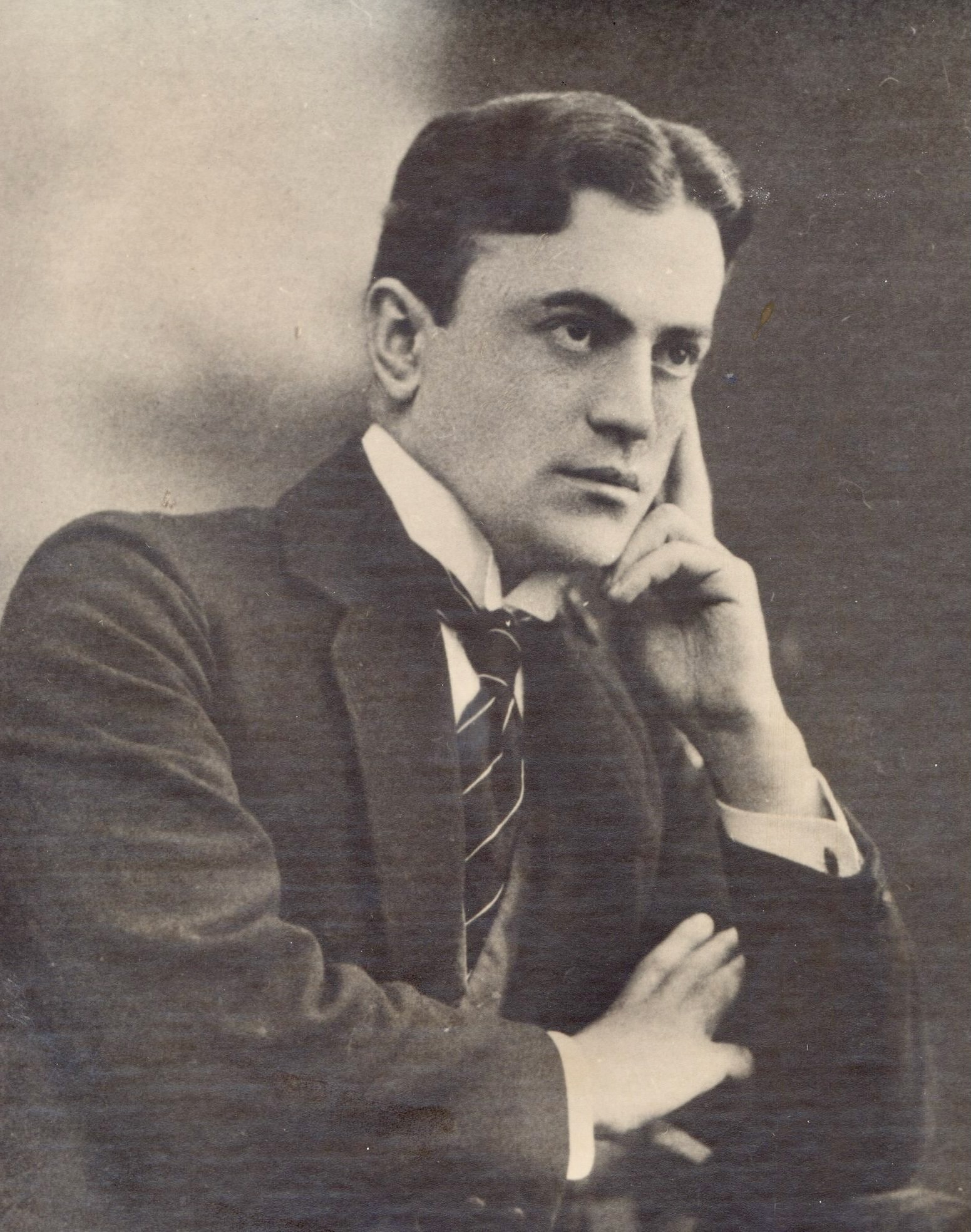
Sandro Akhmeteli, a leading Georgian theater director.

- Sandro Akhmeteli
- Kote Marjanishvili
- Robert Sturua
- Mikheil Tumanishvili

=== Writers, male ===
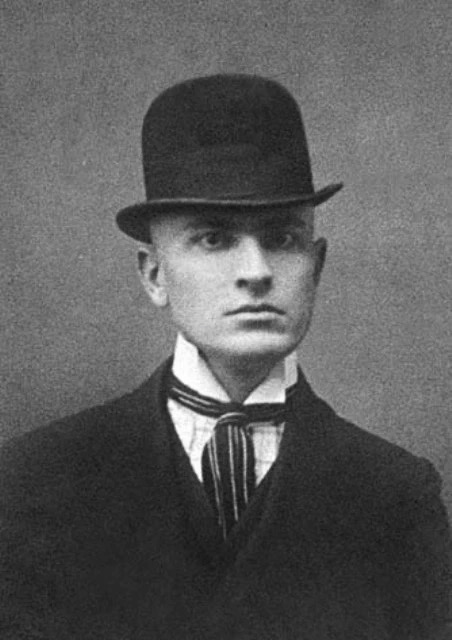
Writer and publicist Grigol Robakidze

- Vasil Barnovi
- Lasha Bugadze
- Otar Chiladze
- Tamaz Chiladze
- Konstantine Gamsakhurdia
- Levan Gotua
- Shalva Dadiani
- Guram Dochanashvili
- Mikheil Javakhishvili
- Otia Ioseliani
- Jemal Karchkhadze
- Leo Kiacheli
- David Kldiashvili
- Aka Morchiladze
- George Papashvily
- Guram Rcheulishvili
- Grigol Robakidze
- Avksenty Tsagareli
- David Turashvili
- Nodar Dumbadze
- Terenti Graneli
- Boygar Razikashvili

== Cultural groups ==
=== Dance troupes ===
- Erisioni
- Sukhishvilebi - Georgian National Ballet

=== Choirs ===
- Rustavi Choir

== Sport ==
- Zaza Pachulia (basketball player for Golden State Warriors)
- Kakha Kaladze (footballer for AC Milan)
- Khvicha Kvaratskhelia (footballer for PSG)
- Georges Mikautadze (footballer for Villarreal CF)
- Ilia Topuria (former UFC featherweight and lightweight champion)
- Merab Dvalishvili (former UFC bantamweight champion)

Rugby union is a popular team sport played in Georgia. Rugby union is considered the second most popular sport in Georgia, after football.

== See also ==
- Outline of culture
- Outline of Georgia (country)
- History of Georgia
- Georgian people
- Georgian language
- Georgian Orthodox and Apostolic Church
- List of libraries in Georgia (country)
- Music of Georgia
- Dances of Georgia
- Keipi
- Kinto
- Architecture of Georgia
- List of museums in Georgia (country)
