= Grigol =

Grigol (Georgian: გრიგოლ) is a Georgian masculine given name. It is a cognate of the name Gregory.

People with the name Grigol include:

- Grigol Abashidze (1914–1994), Georgian poet
- Grigol Bagration of Mukhrani (1787–1861), Georgian nobleman
- Grigol Bakurianis-dze (Gregory Pakourianos, died 1086), Byzantine politician and military commander
- Grigol Bediashvili (born 1980), Georgian footballer (goalkeeper)
- Grigol Chanturia (born 1973), Georgian footballer
- Grigol Dadiani (1770–1804), prince of Mingrelia
- Grigol Dadiani (Kolkhideli) (1814–1901), Georgian prince and poet
- Grigol Dolidze (born 1982), Georgian footballer
- Grigol Giorgadze (1879–1937), Georgian historian, jurist and politician
- Grigol Gruzinsky (1789–1830), Georgian prince
- Grigol Hamam (died 897), ruler of Hereti (Arran)
- Grigol Imedadze (born 1980), Georgian footballer
- Grigol of Kakheti (died in 827), prince of Kakheti in eastern Georgia from 786 to 827
- Grigol Khandzteli (Gregory of Khandzta, 759–861), Georgian church leader
- Grigol Kipshidze (born 2005), Georgian singer
- Grigol Kobakhidze (George Coby, 1883–1967) American businessman, first Georgian millionaire
- Grigol Labadze (Gia Labadze, born 1973), Georgian rugby player
- Grigol Lordkipanidze (1881–1937), Georgian politician and author
- Grigol Maisuradze (1817–1885), Georgian painter
- Grigol Mamrikishvili (born 1981), Georgian judoka
- Grigol Mgaloblishvili (born 1973), Georgian politician and diplomat, Prime Minister of Georgia from 2008 to 2009
- Grigol Orbeliani (1804–1883), Georgian Romanticist poet and soldier in the Imperial Russian service
- Grigol (Sergo) Orjonikidze (1886–1937), Georgian Bolshevik and Soviet politician
- Grigol Peradze (1899–1942), Georgian ecclesiastic figure, theologian, historian, Archimandrite, Professor
- Grigol Robakidze (1882–1962), Georgian writer, publicist, and public figure
- Grigol Tsereteli (1870–1938), Georgian scientist, one of the founders of Papyrology
- Grigol Uratadze (1880–1959), Georgian Social Democratic politician, diplomat and author
- Grigol Vashadze (born 1958), Georgian politician, diplomat and Minister for Foreign Affairs of Georgia
