= Tsiskari =

Georgian literary journal, 1852–1875

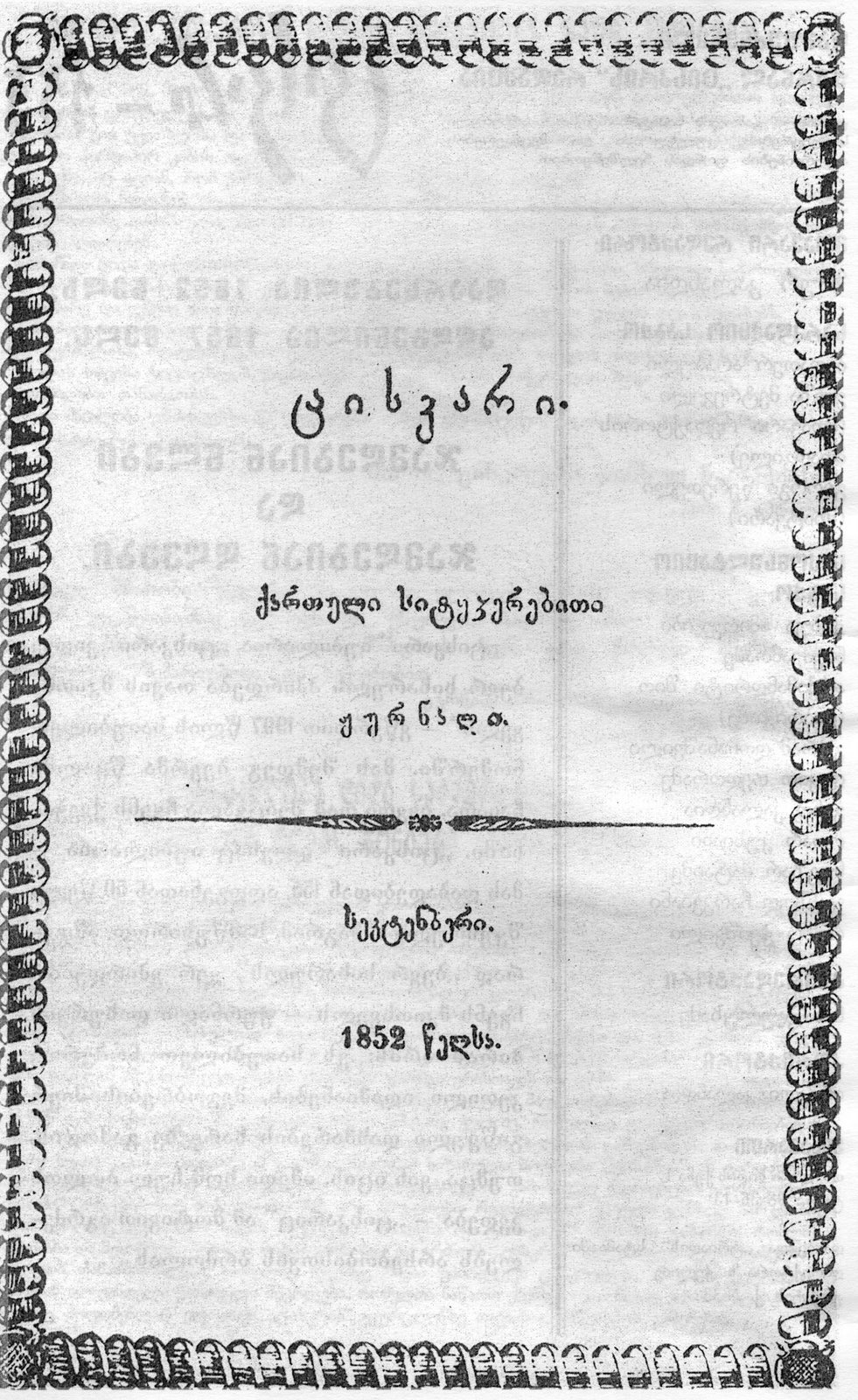
- Cover of the magazine
- Native name: ცისკარი
- Founded: 1852
- First issue: 1852; 173 years ago
- Final issue: 1875; 150 years ago
- Country: Russian Empire
- Language: Georgian

Tsiskari (Georgian: ცისკარი; Dawn) is a literary magazine published intermittently in the Georgian language from 1852 to 1875.

The magazine was founded in 1852 by the Georgian prince Giorgi Eristov, with the support of the Caucasian governor, Mikhail Semyonovich Vorontsov, who personally requested permission from Nicholas I to publish it. Vorontsov also immediately subscribed to 100 copies of the magazine for female students at the St. Nina educational institution, established by his wife Elizaveta Ksaveryevna.

From 1852 to 1853, Tsiskari was headed by Eristov and printed at Patkanov's printing house. Unfortunately, due to an insufficient number of subscribers, its publication was suspended at the end of 1853. The publication resumed in 1857 under the direction of Ivan Kereselidze, with printing operations transferred to the Tsiskari printing house in the same year. In 1870, the printing shifted to Martirosyan's printing house, and subsequently to that of Ekvtime Kheladze.

At various times, contributors to the magazine included Grigol Orbeliani, Vakhtang Orbeliani, Alexander Orbeliani, Platon Ioseliani, Dimitri Kipiani, Mikhail Tumanov, and others. The magazine also published the works of notable authors such as Sulkhan-Saba Orbeliani, David Guramishvili, Alexander Chavchavadze, Nikoloz Baratashvili, and others, which were previously circulated in manuscript form. The magazine also featured works by notable 19th-century Georgian writers such as Daniel Chonkadze, Lavrenti Ardaziani, Anton Purtseladze, Ilia Chavchavadze, Akaki Tsereteli, Giorgi Tsereteli, Raphael Eristavi, and others. Additionally, translations of works by renowned Russian and European writers, including Pushkin, Lermontov, Nekrasov, Zhukovsky, Turgenev, Byron, Béranger, Hugo, and Dickens, were published. The magazine also included historical, literary, and journalistic articles.

== Literature ==
- А. А. Сурков, ed. (1975). "Цискари". Краткая литературная энциклопедия. Том 8: Флобер — Яшпал. Москва. pp. 401–402.
- Периодическая печать на Кавказе (PDF). Тифлис. 1901. pp. 27–30.
