= Lavrenti Ardaziani =

Georgian writer and journalist

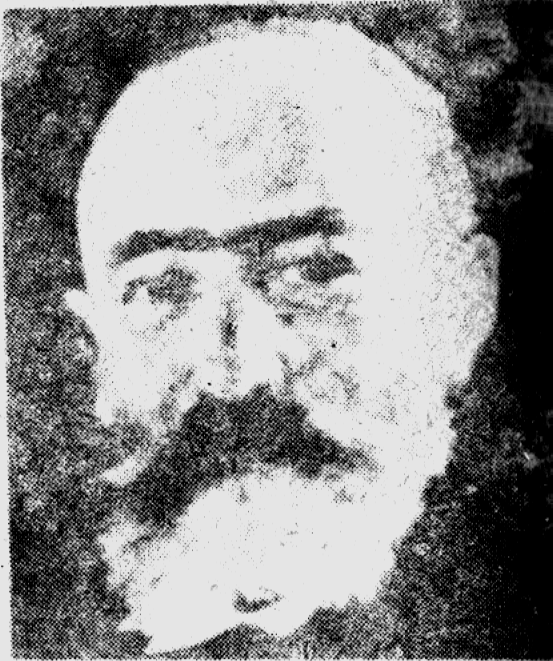

Lavrenti Ardaziani (Georgian: ლავრენტი არდაზიანი; 1815 – January 1, 1870) was a Georgian writer and journalist and one of the forerunners of Georgian realistic fiction prose.

Born in Tiflis of a deacon, Ardaziani graduated from the local theological seminary and entered the civil service under the Russian viceroyal administration. He debuted with prose translation of Shakespeare in 1858 and quickly established himself as one of the leading contributors to the principal Georgian literary magazine Tsiskari. His works – full of satirical touches – are noted for their realistic portrayal of social life in old Tbilisi. His best known novella Solomon Isakich Mejganuashvili (სოლომონ ისაკიჩ მეჯღანუაშვილი, 1861) is a first-person life-story told by the eponymous hero of the Tiflis Armenian milieu, who starts modestly as a small tradesman and then turn to money lending so that the aristocracy also falls into his clutches. He now aims at becoming accepted in beau monde and wants to marry his daughter off to a Georgian prince Alexander Raindidze who, a well-bred and enlightened liberal man, is presented as a contrast to the character of Solomon. Of note are also Ardaziani's work Travelling by the Pavements of Tiflis (მოგზაურობა ტფილისის ტროტუარზედ, 1862), novel The Obedient Woman (მორჩილი, 1862) and polemic essays in the Georgian press.

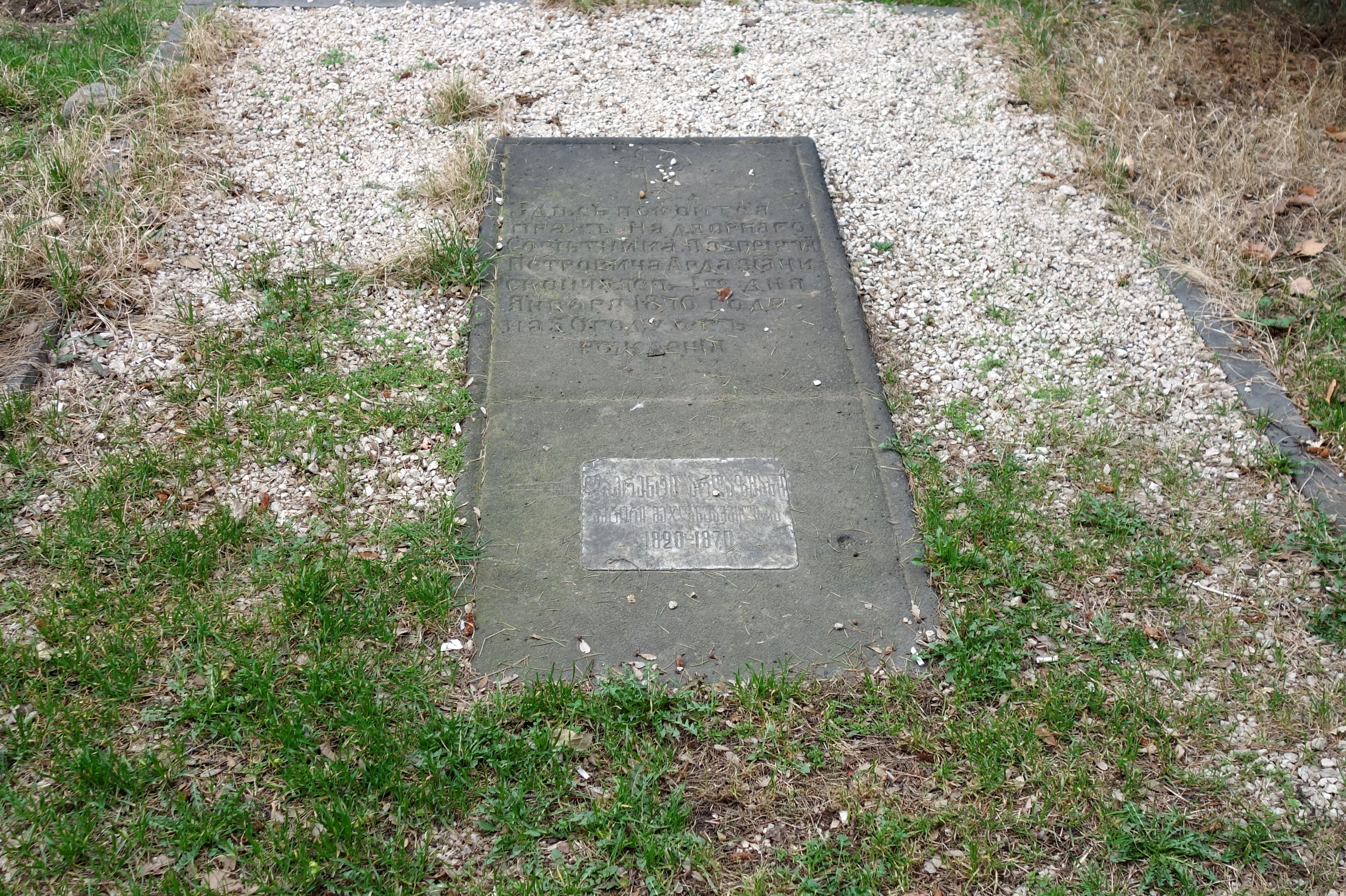
L. Ardaniziani's grave in Vera Park, Tbilisi
