= Anbandidi Gospel =

9th-century Georgian biblical manuscript

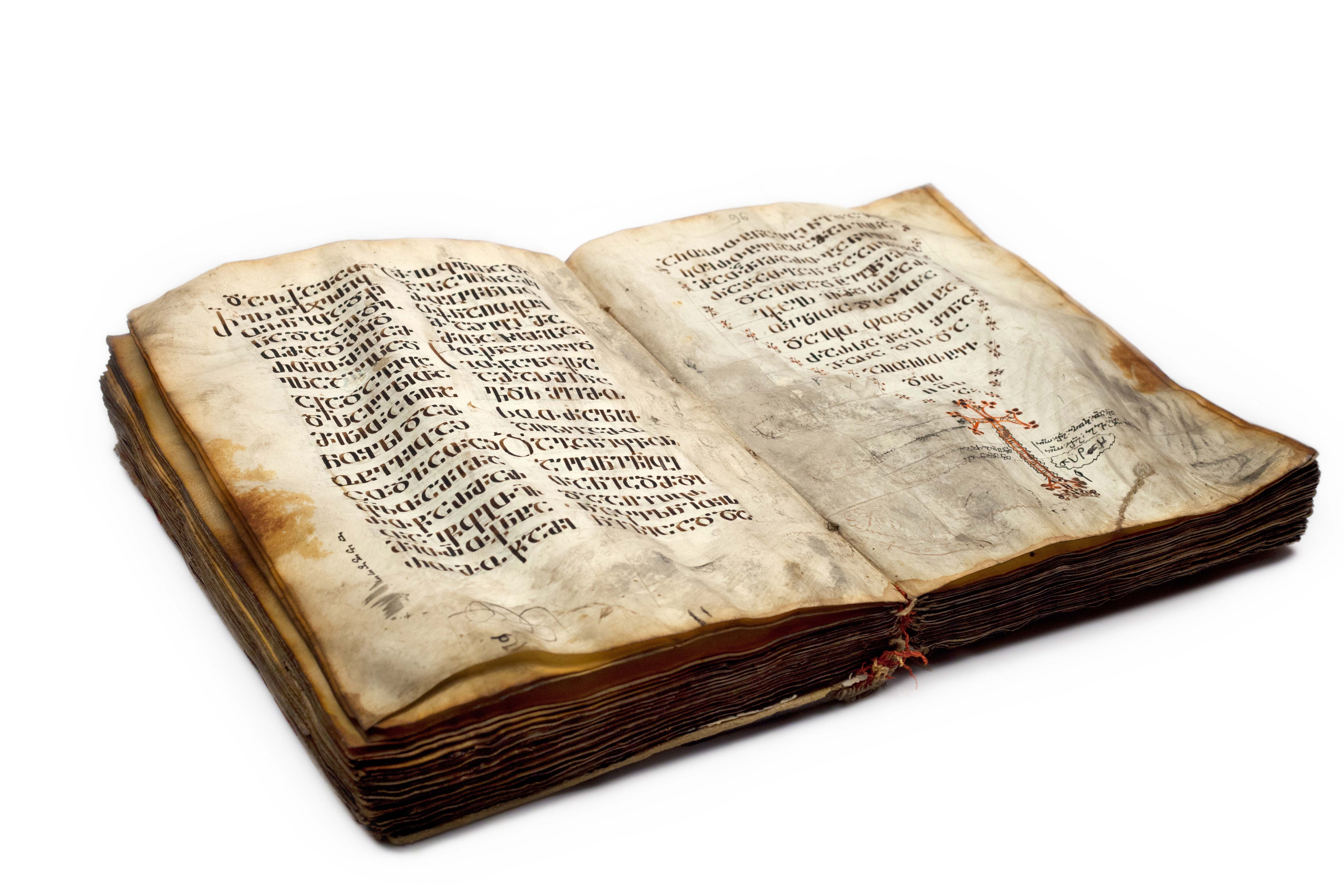
Anbandidi Gospel, 9th c.

The Anbandidi Gospel (Georgian: ანბანდიდი სახარება, romanized: anbandidi sakhareba) consists of four Gospels and dates back to the 9th century. They are currently housed in the National Archives of Georgia, fond #1446, manuscript #107. They have 192 pages, are made of parchment. The dimensions are: 317x237; Asomtavruli; ink – brown, embellished initials – in certain cases with cinnabar. The text is rewritten in some parts; the manuscript is entirely written in Asomtavruli, in two columns; upper borders are cut and the traces of upper quire pagination are lost; ruling lines and dots are very visible.

The manuscript has partially retained its cover panels; traces of older – leather locks are discernible; wooden pegs for fixing leather are preserved.

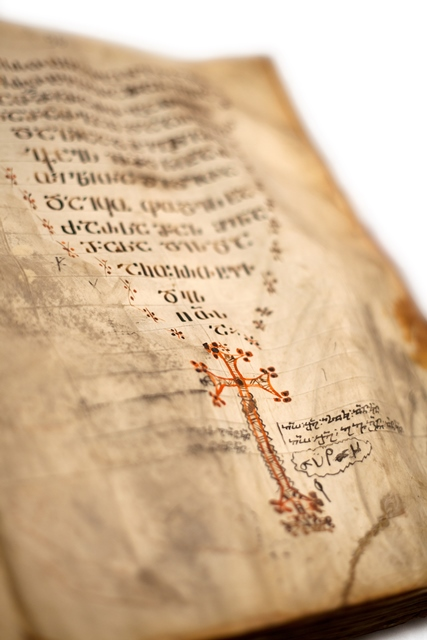
Anbandidi Gospel

Due to the extremely large size of the graphemes, the manuscript is known as the Anbandidi (with big alphabet) Gospel in academic circles. The Anbandidi Gospel is one of the several oldest Georgian manuscripts; it is distinguished by its simplicity, exquisiteness, oldness, text version, material and spiritual values. The decoration of the text is formed in a strictly arranged frame, Calvary Cross embedded in the text (96r), decorated initials embellished with cinnabar, accentuated endings.

The Anbandidi Gospel is one of those rare manuscripts containing four Gospels [Opisa (913), Jruchi (936), Parkhali (973), of Tevdore (10th c.) and Gabriel Patarai (10th c.), which are entirely written in Asomtavruli. The hardened, stained, but still well preserved parchment manuscript bears the traces of travel within quite a vast geographical area.

In addition to the Gospel text, the codex contains indexes of the lections, copied at the end of the manuscript on folios 191v and 192r. These indexes provide essential structural data regarding the liturgical use of the text. They were studied and published by Bernard Outtier.

The manuscript is supplied with 17th-18th cc. records, while a large synodicon, which is ascribable to the late Middle Ages and is still unstudied, is attached at the end.

In 2015, the Anbandidi Gospel was inscribed on the UNESCO Memory of the World international register.

== Radiocarbon Dating ==
Between 2024 and 2025, the DeLiCaTe project (“The Development of Literacy in the Caucasian Territories”), led by Jost Gippert, at the University of Hamburg, Centre for the Study of Manuscript Cultures, conducted a landmark study on Georgian manuscript history. In a strategic collaboration with the Federal Institute of Technology (ETH) and the National Archives of Georgia, researchers performed the first systematic radiocarbon (^{14}C) analysis of the parchment from the Anbandidi Gospels. Using Accelerator Mass Spectrometry (AMS), the laboratory analysis yielded the following chronological data:

- Radiocarbon Age: 1181 ± 22 BP (Before Present)
- Calibrated Date Range: 772–945 calCE
- Statistical Peaks: 785, 840, and 885 calCE

Based on these results, the codex has been securely attributed to the late 8th to 9th centuries.
