= Giorgi Avalishvili =

Georgian diplomat (1769–1850)

Giorgi Avalishvili (Georgian: გიორგი ავალიშვილი; 1769 – 1850) was a Georgian diplomat, writer and one of the founding fathers of the Georgian theatre. His sister Mariam was married to the Georgian diplomat Garsevan Chavchavadze.

Belonging to a princely family hailing from the kingdom of Kakheti in eastern Georgia, Avalishvili was educated in the Russian Empire. After the Russo-Georgian treaty of Georgievsk, he served as envoy to Saint Petersburg for the Georgian kings Heraclius II and George XII between 1784 and 1801.

Avalishvili traveled to the Middle East from 1819 to 1820 and wrote a valuable and long travelogue. The rest of his work has largely been lost. Avalishvili extensively translated Russian and Western European authors. He helped to found the first national Georgian theatre at the court of Heraclius II in Tbilisi in 1791. He is also credited with writing the first original Georgian drama, King Teimuraz, of which only the author's prologue survives.
