= Ioane Shavteli =

Georgian poet

Ioane Shavteli (Georgian: იოანე შავთელი) was a Georgian poet of the late 12th and early 13th centuries credited to have written the encomiastic poem traditionally, and unsuitably, known as Abdulmesiani (აბდულმესიანი), i.e., "Slave of the Messiah" (from Arabic عبد المسيح, Abdul Masīh).

A reference to Shavteli and his work is made in a postscript of Shota Rustaveli’s The Knight in the Panther's Skin (ვეფხისტყაოსანი), which is the source of the poem's incongruous title. Shavteli's ode is, in fact, a eulogy to the two greatest monarchs of medieval Georgia, David "the Builder" (r. 1089-1125) and the poet's contemporary Queen Tamar (r. 1184-1213). Little is known about the author's biography himself. "Shavteli" seems to be a territorial epithet, meaning "of/from Shavsheti" (modern Şavşat, Turkey). Shavteli's style includes a strong patristic discourse and his language is to a considerable extent artificial and archaically bookish. Possibly a cleric, he is reported by the medieval chronicles to have been a famous poet and philosopher and to have accompanied Tamar in several of her travels and military campaigns.

Shavteli's panegyric focuses on praising the Christian virtues of David and Tamar, without naming either however. The references to Tamar are coded by praise of her beauty, her love of "doing good by stealth", also praised in similar phrases by the queen's chronicler as well as by the two contemporary poets - Rustaveli and Chakhrukhadze. David can be recognized by allusions to his biblical namesake (from whom the Georgian dynasty of Bagrationi claimed descent) as well as by interweaving words and phrases from the king's own religious lyrics, the Hymns of Penitence (გალობანი სინანულისანი).
