= Oleg Timchenko =

- Born: Oleg Timchenko; 1957
- Education: Tbilisi Academy of Fine Arts
- Notable work: “Ophelia” 1996
- Movement: Contemporary Georgian

Oleg Timchenko is a Tbilisi-based contemporary painter and founder of the "10th Floor Group". He was born in Old Tbilisi and studied painting at the Tbilisi Academy of Fine Arts.

== Background ==
In 1917, shortly after the Russian Revolution, the family of Oleg Timchenko's mother fled to Georgia to escape repressions due to the noble origins of their family.

The artist's grandfather was the painter Evgenyi Gulitskii. Gulitskii was a businessman aiding the first Russian aviators and various progressive technologically advanced projects.

Oleg Timchenko's father, Ivan Timchenko, was also a painter. Originally from Vitebsk, Belarus, Ivan Timchenko was working in Caucasus, where he met Oleg's mother.

Timchenko's brother, Konstantine, worked in a royal chancellery of the Emperor Nicholas II.

Oleg Timchenko's ancestors migrated to Georgia from St Petersburg and Vitebsk. For this reason "migration" is the artist’s fate determined by physical resettlement of his ancestors and embodied in his art. His paintings are imitation of "migration" to various countries, epochs, space and cultural layers, through his personal or genetic memory.

== Career ==
From 1987 to 1991, Oleg worked as a painter in the Marjanishvili Theater. During this time, Timchenko and his friends created the theater group called "10th Floor Group", which was composed of Georgian Happening artists.

Several Years later he established another artist group called "Marjanishvili".

== Art ==
His early works of the 1980s are noted with an ascetic expressionism and were gradually replaced by firework expression determined by intensity of color and stroke. Timchenko follows these two trends from the very beginning, but with time the margin between them becomes more obvious.

Migration plays a part in the Timchenko’s work representing various countries, epochs, space and cultural layers, through his personal or genetic memory.

In general, Timchenko is interested in characters – whether it is Ophelia, the Sphinx, Infantas, Pontius Pilate, or a dwarf, – and is said to be an empathetic participant of the story rather than a distant story-teller. He makes his characters and attributes in the images of people, animals, toys, plants, and objects that eventually turn into the models of his art and then he makes up new stories about each of them.

He has been considered a “transformer” artist whose art is a means of transformation. Timchenko's works often create a whole set of contrasting characters – sad angels, tragic dancing gnomes, wonder-struck forest ghosts with childish and non-childish expressions, often decorated with roses, precious stones, and jewelry. Timchenko often employs invention in this process of transformation: Infantas make friends with “dolls”, princes with leopards, Ali Baba with a crane, a toy horse with a childish and naïve expression gallops from one picture to another.

Perhaps his most noted work, "Ophelia " (1996) was born from the idea of creating a projection in waters. The themes surrounding Ophelia have a close link to all of Timchenko's work. For him she embodies the paradox of "beauty" and "transitoriness". Timchenko: "I paint neither trees nor leaves. I paint the wind touching the leaves" — in this case the water touching Ophelia.

Timchenko realized a more literal version of this idea in 1998 in Prague, where he installed a projector at the Charles Bridge and a canvas of 8 x 3 metres beneath the surface of the Vltava river. After a subsequent exhibition in Bratislava, he installed a projector over an aquarium of the original size of the painting 1999 in Paris.

Oleg Timchenko is a “reactionary” artist and his reaction is compassion. He loves the world, is interested in and suffers from the “pain” of the latter. His personal feelings are transformed into eternal topics. He touches on the themes involving a drama, strong emotions: love, death, beauty, psycho-somatic difference, risk, fear, pain. He is a bit grotesque, expressive, expressly childish, but not naïve. He rather has a nostalgic approach of an adult toward childhood, having a desire to play and a priority to detect beauty in every happening.

Expression was there from the very start – as early as in the "tenth floor" period. However, in the beginning the dramatic tension was not so permeated with beauty. This occurred later, i.e. one vision was enriched with another. The ascetic expressionism of the 1980s was gradually replaced by fireworkish expression determined by intensity of color and stroke. The effect of "firework," i.e. processing of the surface of the picture with paint, creates the effect of 'explosion," "pulsation" of a color and gives the picture vibrating visual impression creating illusion of a celebration and fairy tale. The firework-like style, sometimes with a touch of "kitsch," and minimalism of the style – the artist follows these two trends from the very beginning, but with time the margin between them becomes more obvious. The topic of the picture itself dictates to the painter the style which is sometimes realistic and surface patterned, and sometimes so poster-like and generalized that the image can be presented as a sign or symbol. That is, the "reality is replaced by the signs of reality." As a result of such generalization, the symbol separated from the basic reality, acquires new meaning. Therefore, in Oleg Timchenko's paintings ordinary items, objects or characters maintaining their historic or cultural context, simultaneously become inhabitants of a new hyper-real world created by the painter. At the same time this world contains continuous surprises.

Through each new series of pictures the artist extends the "territory" of his works and expands the "map" of his world. The figure tied to the flying crane’s leg from the series of Ali Baba’s journey is the symbol of the artist himself who shares with us his impressions of this "journey" through his works.

== Solo exhibitions ==
- 2011 – "Come Together", Art Bazaar, New York, New York
- 2008 – "The Condition", Tbilisi, Georgia
- 2008 – Embassy of Georgia, Hague, Holland
- 2005 – Center Point Gallery, Tbilisi, Georgia.
- 2004 – "Nostalgia", Botanical Garden, Tbilisi, Georgia.
- 2003 – Gallery Hobby, Tbilisi, Georgia.
- 2001 – "Game", N Gallery, Tbilisi, Georgia.
- 1998 – Project "Ophelia", Video-installation on the river, Prague, Czech Republic.

== Group exhibitions ==
- 2009 – "Reflection", Gallery Telescope, Tbilisi, Georgia.
- 2008 – "Condition", Gallery Baia, Tbilisi, Georgia.
- 2007 – "Nostalgia", Gallery Baia, Tbilisi, Georgia.
- 2007 – "Bucephalus", Photo-installation, Gallery Baia, Tbilisi, Georgia.
- 2007 – "Let's strengthen together Justice of Georgia", Art center "Muza", gallery TMS, Tbilisi, Georgia.
- 2006 – Modern Art Center, Moscow, Russia.
- 2006 – Workshop "Paper", Baku, Azerbaijan.
- 2006 – "Mansard of artists", 1st Biennale in Petersburg, Russia.
- 2005 – Workshop "Wind from Caucasus", Art Willa Garikula, Georgia.
- 2003 – Gallery Vernisage, Tbilisi, Georgia.
- 2002 – Festival "Tabla", Photo-exhibition, Art Center VWK, Vienna, Prague.
- 2001 – Slide – projection "Forest souls", Geneva, Switzerland.
- 2000 – "Aquarium", Paris, France.
- 1998 – Exhibition space at UNESCO, Paris, France.
- 1997 – Gallery IFA, Berlin, Germany.
- 1993 – 2nd Biennale of Contemporary Art, Cetin, Montenegro.
- 1992 – "World of senses", project of Victor Miziano, Moscow, Russia.
- 1992 – "Heat and Conduct", Sheffield museum, Gallery Arlophin, Bristol, UK.
- 1990 – 1st International Biennale of Art, Saint Petersburg, Russia.
- 1988 – "Black and White Gallery", Budapest, Hungary.
- 1987 – "Person + Art", Leipzig, Gallery Friedrich, Köln, Germany.
- 1987 – "10th floor", Artist House, Tbilisi, Georgia.
- 1986 – "10th floor", Tbilisi History Museum, Georgia.
- 1985 – International Music Festival in Telavi, Group "Archivarius", Georgia.

== Collections ==
- Tsaritsino Museum of Contemporary Art, Moscow, Russia
- Ludwig Museum – Budapest, Hungary
- Tbilisi Museum of Contemporary Art
- Office of Mayor of Bristol
- Gallery of Francoise Fridrikch – Koln, Germany
- Vien Gallery – Vienna, Austria
- Wolfgang Flatz – Personal Collection
- President Saakashvili – Personal Collection
- Badri Patarkachishvili – Personal Collection
- Liana Lobzhanidze's private collection, Tbilisi, Georgia
- Tatyana Kolodzei Foundation – USA
- Rosa Marquise Private collection, Amsterdam, Holland, France, USA, Germany, Russia
