= Inga Kashakashvili =

- Origin: Kutaisi, Georgia
- Genres: Classical
- Occupation: Pianist
- Years active: 1991–present
- Website: www.ingakashakashvili.com

Inga Kashakashvili (born September 27, 1974) in Kutaisi, Georgia, is a Georgian classical pianist.

== Biography ==
Georgian-born pianist, Inga Kashakashvili, has performed at major venues such as Carnegie Hall, Jazz at Lincoln Center, Le Poisson Rouge, Steinway Hall, Merkin Hall at Kaufman Center, the Metropolitan Opera, Lyric Opera of Chicago, Tradegar House and the Tbilisi Center for Music and Culture.

She is a prizewinner of numerous international competitions, including the Artists International Auditions and the Jacob Flier International Piano Competition in New York and the Newport International Competition for Young Pianists in Wales. She has participated in prestigious music festivals including the Fête de la Musique in conjunction with the French-American Piano Society and Steinway & Sons at Sofitel in New York, the United Sounds of America in Chicago, PianoSummer at New Paltz in New York, and the Leipzig Music Festival in Germany.

In October 2018, NAXOS of America records releases a new CD album “Wanderer” worldwide, on which Ms. Kashakashvili plays a major role as a performer of recorded and premiered composer George Oakley’s Sonata for cello and piano, Four Songs based on Shakespeare Sonnets for mezzo soprano and piano and Toccata for solo piano.

Kashakashvili studied at Tbilisi State Conservatory, DePaul University and Mannes College of Music; her main teachers were Nino Katamadze, Eteri Andjaparidze and Vladimir Feltsman.

== Awards ==
Kashakashvili won Artists International Debut Award and was presented at Carnegie Hall, New York (2008). She is a prizewinner of Jacob Flier International Piano Competition, New Paltz, NY (2001) and Newport International Competition for Young Pianists, Wales, UK (1991). Based on individual accomplishments and contributions to society Inga Kashakashvili was listed in the International Madison Who's Who (2006-2007).

She received Mannes College the New School for Music Scholarship Award in 2006; DePaul University Full Scholarship Award in 2003-2005; DePaul University performance award in 2003; Festival Piano Summer at New Paltz Award in 2001, among others.
