= Nino Surguladze =

Georgian operatic mezzo-soprano (born 1977)

Nino Surguladze ნინო სურგულაძე
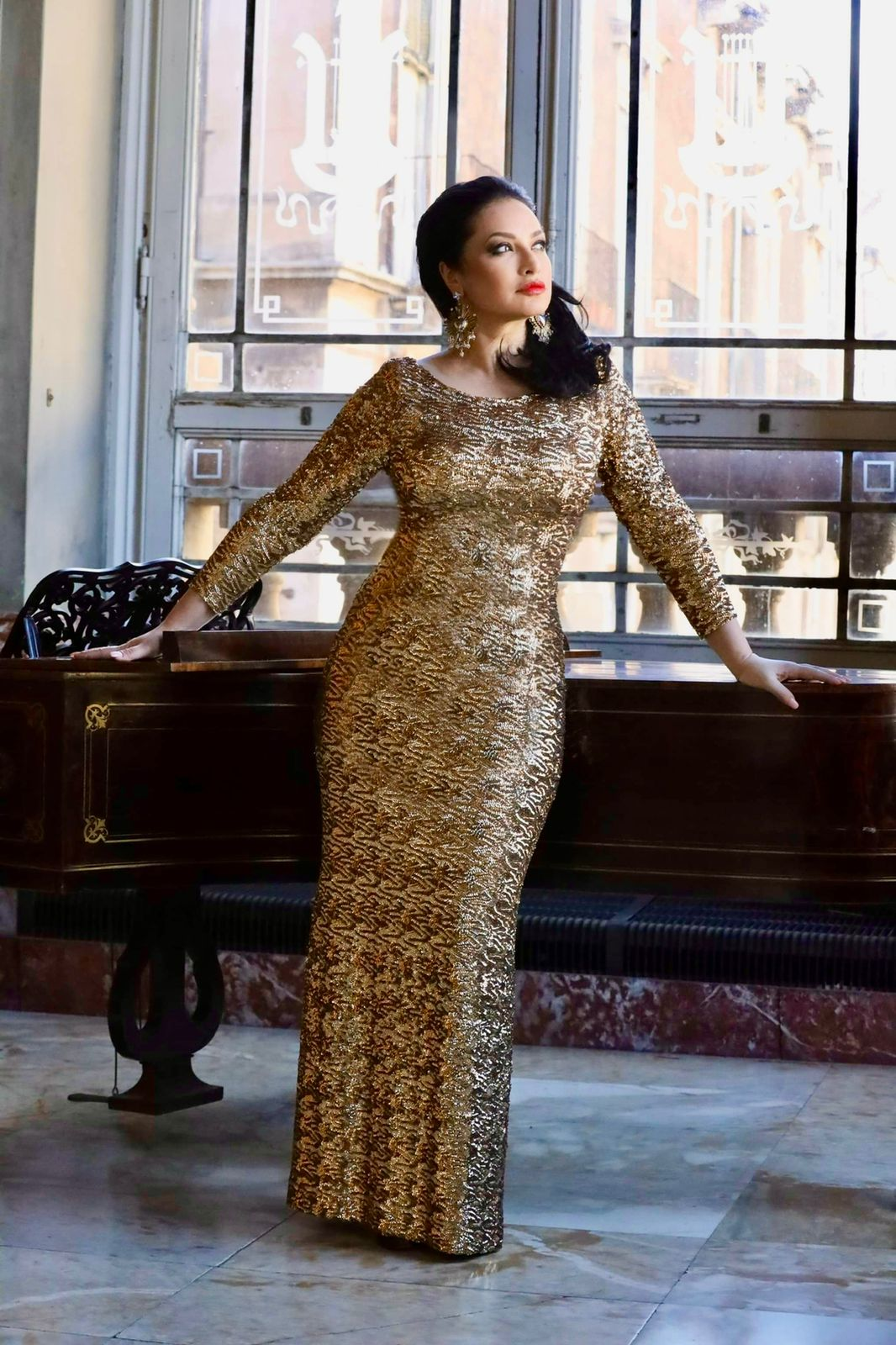

Background information
- Born: 12 October 1977 (age 48); Tbilisi, Georgia
- Education: Tbilisi State Conservatoire; La Scala
- Genres: Classical music
- Occupation: Mezzo-soprano
- Years active: 2002–present

Nino Surguladze (Georgian: ნინო სურგულაძე; born 12 October 1977, Tbilisi) is a Georgian operatic mezzo-soprano.

== Biography ==
Born in Tbilisi, Surguladze studied singing with Guliko Kariauli at the Tbilisi State Conservatoire. After winning a prize at the Francisco Viñas International Singing Contest in Barcelona, she earned her a scholarship at the Accademia of the Teatro alla Scala, where she studied with Leyla Gencer and Luciana Serra. She made her operatic debut as Cuniza in Verdi's Oberto and Zulma in Rossini's L'italiana in Algeri in Milan in 2002, and has since appeared in many opera houses around the world.

She has appeared in the Italian television film Rigoletto a Mantova (2010) and in the Georgian films Valsi Pechoraze and Metichara. In 2010, she was awarded the Presidential Order of Excellence by Mikhail Saakashvili. In 2018 she appeared in the title role of a video-recorded performance of Bizet's Carmen by the Opéra Royal de Liège.

Surguladze is a founder of the charity foundation Desire Tree, which aims to provide assistance to children in need of medical care.

== Operatic repertoire ==
Bellini

- Adalgisa (Norma)

Berlioz

- Marguerite (La Damnation de Faust)

Bizet

- Carmen (Carmen)

Gounod

- Siebel (Faust)

Tchaikovsky

- Olga (Eugene Onegin)

Mascagni

- Santuzza (Cavalleria rusticana)

Mozart

- Dorabella (Così fan tutte)

Verdi

- Amneris (Aida)
- Fenena (Nabucco)
- Maddalena (Rigoletto)

== Discography ==
- Giuseppe Verdi: Rigoletto. Arthaus, DVD, 2010
- Bizet: Carmen. Dynamic, DVD, 2009
- Sergei Prokofiev: Betrothal in a monastery. Glyndebourne, CD, 2006
- Giuseppe Verdi: Nabucco. Arthaus, DVD, 2006
- Gioacchino Rossini: Moïse et Pharaon. TDK, DVD, 2005
- Shostakovich: Lady Macbeth of Mtsensk. EMI Classics, DVD, 2002
