= Chakhrukhadze =

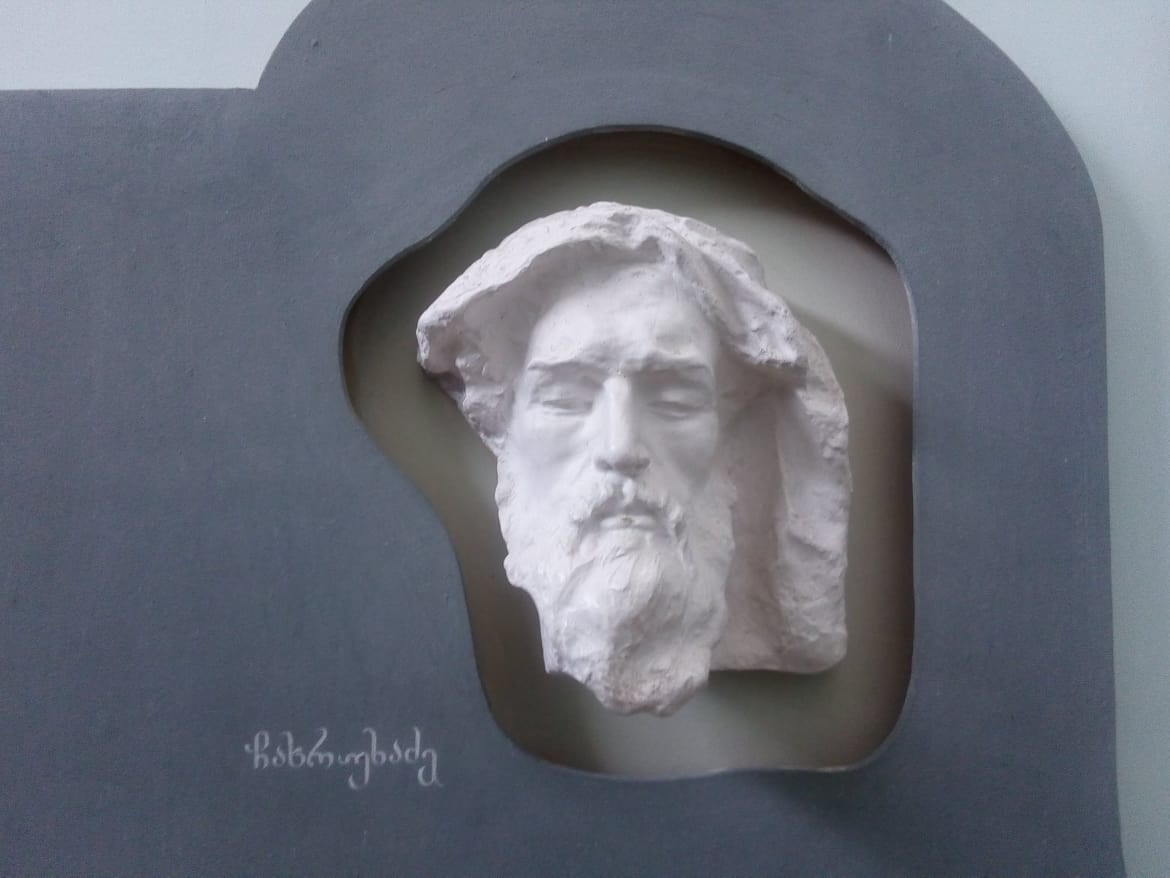
Bust of Chakhrukhadze.

Chakhrukhadze (Georgian: ჩახრუხაძე) was a Georgian poet of the late 12th/early 13th century traditionally credited to have written Tamariani (თამარიანი), a collection of twenty two odes and one elegy praising, often deifying Queen Tamar of Georgia (r. 1184-1213). The poet is identified with the certain layman Grigol Chakhrukhadze whose survived testament unveils the author's desire to retire to the Georgian Monastery of the Holy Cross at Jerusalem. According to later accounts, Chakhurkhadze was native to Georgia's northeastern mountainous area of Khevi and served as a secretary to the queen Tamar.

Based upon a new, pentasyllabic, verse-form (chakhrukhauli), Chakhrukhadze's poetry is remarkable for musicality and linguistic virtuosity, using masterly rhymed adjectives to eulogize Tamar.

== See also ==
- Ioane Shavteli
