= Levan Gotua =

Georgian writer

Levan Gotua (Georgian: ლევან პართენის ძე გოთუა; 10 March 1905 – 30 January 1973) was a Soviet writer.

Gotua was born and died in Tbilisi and was best known for his historical novels; after, and possibly because of, his arrest in 1940, he set all his works in the remote past. One of his most famous works was "Gmirta Varami", which is fueled by the writer's great love of his country and the rich history of Georgia.
