= Badri Maisuradze =

Badri Maisuradze ბადრი მაისურაძე
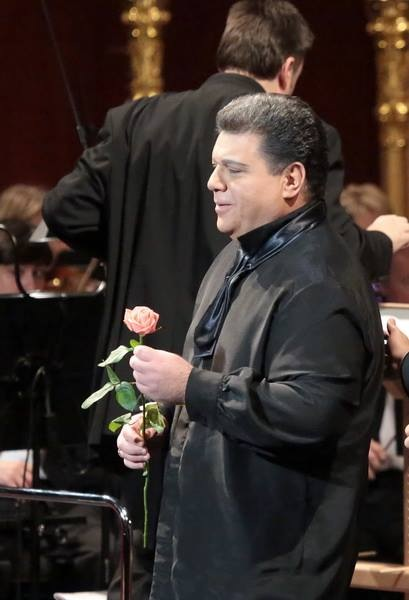

Background information
- Born: 13 July 1966 (age 59); Tbilisi, Georgian SSR, Soviet Union
- Origin: Georgian
- Occupation: dramatic tenor
- Instrument: Vocals
- Years active: 1993-Present

Badri Jemalis dze Maisuradze (Note: Georgian: ბადრი ჯემალის ძე მაისურაძე, romanized: Badri Jemalis dze Maisuradze; Russian: Бадри Джемалович Майсурадзе, romanized: Badri Dzhemalovich Maysuradze) (born on November 13, 1966) is a Georgian tenor opera singer, a leading dramatic tenor of the Bolshoi Theatre in Moscow, Russia.

Born in Tbilisi, Georgian SSR, he graduated from the Tbilisi State Conservatoire in 1989, after which he became a probationer at the Bolshoi Theatre. In 1990-1993, he was a soloist at Tbilisi Opera and Ballet Theatre. In 1995, he joined the Bolshoi Theatre.

From 2016 he is leading Georgian National Opera and Ballet Theatre aT Tbilisi. In 2018 he founded first international vocal competition in Georgia - “Opera Crown”
