= Mamuka Japharidze =

Georgian artist

Mamuka Japharidze (born 1962) is an artist from Tbilisi, Georgia. He is especially known for representing Georgia in the 48th Venice Biennale. He currently lives in Tbilisi and produces his art there.

== Early life ==
Japharidze was born in 1962 and raised in Tbilisi with his sister. His career was encouraged by his father, Jemali Japaridze, also an artist. He often collaborates with his artist and writer partner, Anthea Nicholson. He spends much of his time in England.

== Collaborations/works ==
- 1998 ´Rubens Performance´, video projection, with Several Dancers Core, Atlanta, USA & Tbilisi
- 1995 ´Ramses Looking´, live action with fire, with Anthea Nicholson, Ramsey, Isle of Man & King Street Gallery, Bristol, UK
- 1994 ´I Walked Here, Chagall´, live action with handmade paper, with Martyn Grimmer, Vitepsk, Belarus.

== Organiser/curator ==
- 2003 ´Revive Time´, Kaki Tree project in Georgia, community and children's action.
- 1998 ´By Hand´, UK and Georgian artists exhibition, Caravanserei, Tbilisi
- 1998 Mirzaani International Artists Workshop: 21 artists for 3 weeks.
- 1998 ´Dejeuner sur l´herbe´, city actions, Tbilisi
- 1994 ´Silk Road´, Bristol, UK & Tbilisi artists exchange
- 1991/92 ´Black Market´, Georgian artists gallery show

== Group exhibitions ==
- 2003 ´Opti-mystic Transportation Taxi´, travelling camera obscura, Appendix International Artists event, Tbilisi
- 2002 ´Table for Insects´, live action with insects, Gyumri Biennale, Armenia
- 2001 ´table´, public event, collaborative project for Year of the Artist, Bristol, UK
- 2001 ´East of Eden´, video project, Spacex Gallery, Exeter, UK; Gyumri Biennale, Armenia
- 2000 ´Georgian Nights, Australian Mornings´, live event, Camaflauge, Geneva, Switzerland
- 1999 ´From Tartarus Experience´, wall painting, Georgian Pavilion, Venice Biennale
- 1998 International Artists Symposium, wallpaper prints, Spike Island, Bristol, UK
- 1998 ´Transformation´, UNESCO, Paris
- 1996 ´Icon and Perception´, National Art Gallery, Tbilisi
- 1992 ´Heat and Conduct´, hand knitted jersey with floor piece, Mappin Gallery, Sheffield & Arnolfini, Bristol, UK

== Solo exhibitions ==
- 2002 ´On the Skin´, public action with body prints, punch bag and sound design, Club 22 Tbilisi
- 2001 ´dopple eye´, video projection, Foundry, London
- 2000 ´In a Mirror´, video project, Rail Road Earth, Atlanta, USA
- 1994 ´Rolex´, painting and drawing series, Ethnographic Museum, Caravanserei, Georgia
- 1992 ´What is What´, performance, Ethnographic Museum, Caravanserei, Tbilisi

== Philosophy and targets ==
In 2003, he said:

"Since 1987 I have been working in an international arena; working with language; using language frame as the basic construction and conceptual base of a work. Often using bi-lingual sound-play to find new trans-cultural subjective meanings. The poetic language sound-play can be manifested as sound vibration, concrete text and also the actual object/event itself.

I am investigating the way that objects exist in a separate time/world beyond human´s utilitarian interpretation of time/object. The state of potential before objects/things are manifested is for me a real metaphysical state of existence. The idea of the object exists in ancient mythological dialogue and drama, which for me is still present. When the utilitarian conception of an object is cleared away, the deep metaphysical meaning is revealed.

One basic principle is an investigation of the threshold between an art event and ´non art´. And how the four-dimensional (space, time/metaphysical) aspects of the work in the actual moment of the event, are for me the deep points of realisation.

My target is the actual moment of an event and not towards building a product.

The medium is changeable and includes: media production, e.g. posters, cards (as part of an art work/event); happenings/public events; collecting and archiving images over long periods of time; video projection; photography; printmaking; texts; drawing; sound works."
