= Grigol Bediashvili =

Georgian footballer playing

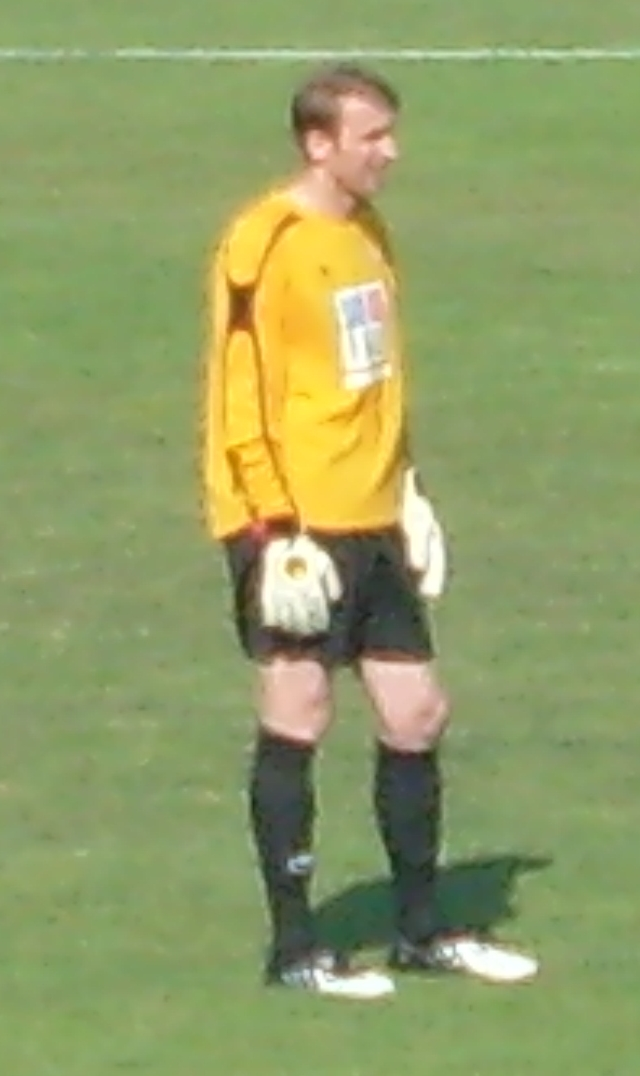

Personal information
- Date of birth: 7 February 1980 (age 46)
- Place of birth: Georgia
- Height: 1.86 m (6 ft 1 in)
- Position: Goalkeeper

Team information
- Current team: FC Metalurgi Rustavi
- Number: 1

Senior career*
Years	Team	Apps	(Gls)
1997	FC Metalurgi Rustavi	1	(0)
1998	Khalibi-97 Rustavi	28	(0)
1999	FC Gorda Rustavi	26	(0)
2000	FC Tbilisi	0	(0)
2000	FC Dinamo Batumi	14	(0)
2001–2003	FC Gorda Rustavi	45	(0)
2003	TSU Tbilisi	12	(0)
2003–2004	FC Rustavi	10	(0)
2004–2010	FC WIT Georgia	44	(0)
2010–2015	FC Metalurgi Rustavi	131	(0)

International career
2009	Georgia	1	(0)
- * Club domestic league appearances and goals

Grigol Bediashvili (Georgian: გრიგოლ ბედიაშვილი; born on 7 February 1980) is a Georgian footballer (goalkeeper) who played most of his professional career for FC Metalurgi Rustavi and FC WIT Georgia.

Bediashvili played for FC WIT Georgia in the first round of the 2005 UEFA Intertoto Cup, the qualifying rounds of the 2006–07 UEFA Cup,

He made his Georgia debut on 10 June 2009 against Albania.

Bediashvili retired from Metalurgi on January 8, 2015.
