= Babo Avalishvili-Kherkheulidze =

Georgian stage actress (1851–1900)

Babo Avalishvili-Kherkheulidze (1851-1900) was a Georgian stage actress. She belonged to the first generation of star actors of the Georgian national stage, the Rustaveli Theater.

She was engaged at the Tbilisi theater when it was opened in 1879. She was the first actress to perform within dramatic tragedy on the stage of the theater.
