= Centre for the Study of Manuscript Cultures, Hamburg =

Research institute at the University of Hamburg

Centre for the Study of Manuscript Cultures Zentrum für Handschriftenkulturen
- Logo of the CSMC
- Established: 2012
- Research type: Research Institute
- Director: Konrad Hirschler
- Location: Hamburg, Germany
- Operating agency: University of Hamburg
- Website: csmc.uni-hamburg.de

The Centre for the Study of Manuscript Cultures (CSMC) is a research institute at the University of Hamburg in Germany, dedicated to the interdisciplinary study of manuscript traditions worldwide. It was established in 2012 and has since become a leading institution in the field.

== History and background ==
CSMC was founded to consolidate manuscript studies within the University of Hamburg. Since 2019, its research activities have been integrated into the Cluster of Excellence "Understanding Written Artefacts", supported by the German Research Foundation (DFG).

== Research focus ==
The center studies the historical and comparative aspects of manuscript cultures, including:

- Material studies – analyzing parchment, ink, and writing techniques.
- Comparative manuscript traditions – examining the evolution of script systems.
- Digital preservation – applying modern technologies to manuscript digitization.

The CSMC operates specialized laboratories, including:

- Visual Manuscript Analysis Lab – for imaging and digital analysis.
- Human-Computer Interaction Lab – for AI-based script recognition.
- High-Performance Lab – for forensic and chemical manuscript analysis.
