= Akhalsopeli, Ozurgeti Municipality =

Akhalsopeli ახალსოფელი
- Village
- Location within Georgia Location within Guria
- Coordinates: 41°58′30″N 41°59′13″E
- Country: Georgia
- Mkhare: Guria
- Municipality: Ozurgeti
- Elevation: 65 m (213 ft)

Population (2014)
  - Total: 400
- Time zone: UTC+4 (Georgian Time)

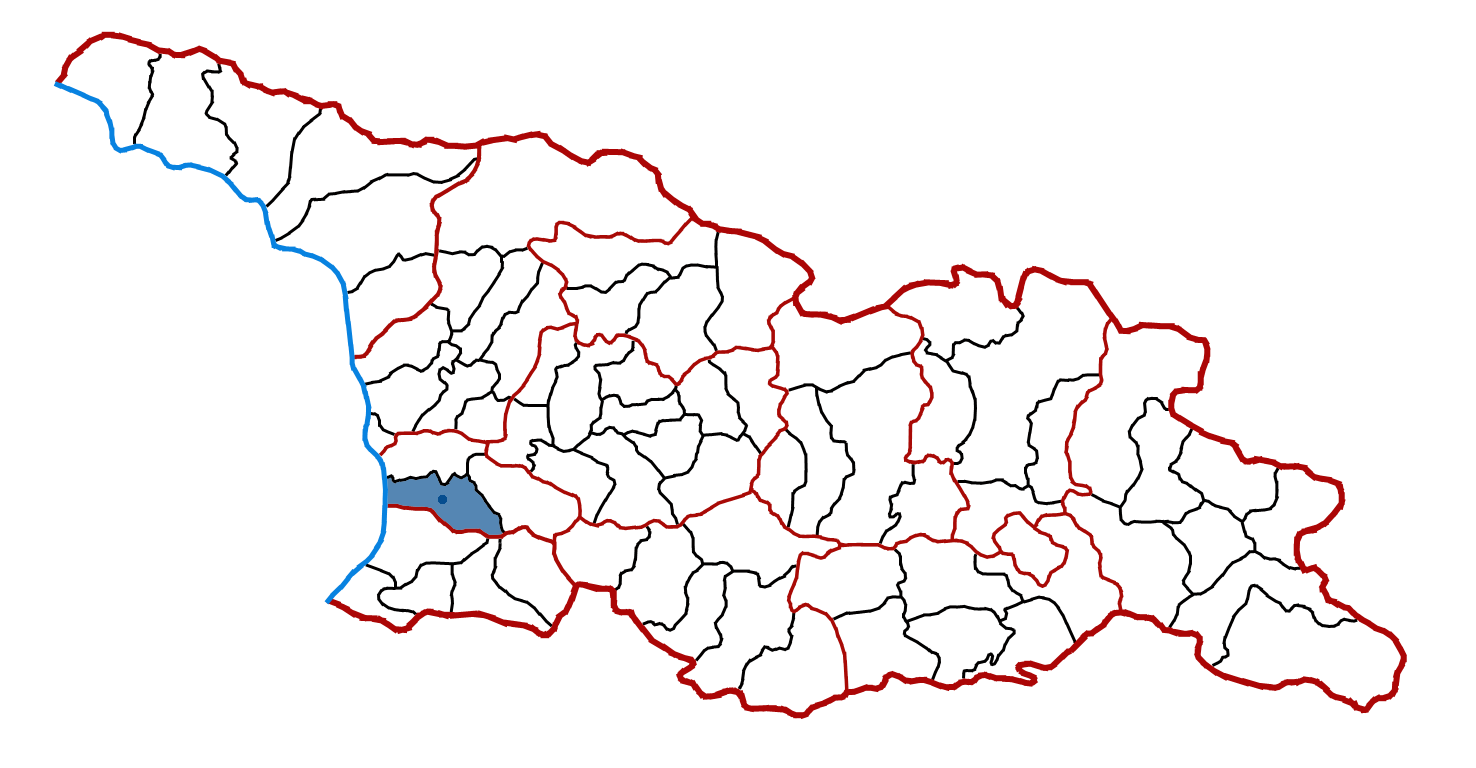
Location of Ozurgeti district in Guria, Georgia

Akhalsopeli (Georgian: ახალსოფელი) is a village in the Ozurgeti Municipality of Guria in western Georgia.
