= Otia Ioseliani =

Otia Ioseliani (Georgian: ოტია იოსელიანი; June 16, 1930 – July 14, 2011) was a Georgian prose writer and dramatist, whose plays have been successfully staged in Georgia as well as in other countries of the former Soviet Union and East Germany.

== Biography ==
Otia Ioseliani was born on 16 June 1930 in the village of Gvishtibi, Tsqaltubo District, in then part of the Georgian SSR. He began writing in the mid-1950s and published his first collection of stories in 1957. The nationwide recognition came with his first novel The Falling Stars (ვარსკვლავთცვენა, 1962), which, like Ioseliani's many early works, treated the theme of World War II. He then tackled in his works a great variety of themes using different artistic styles. In the 1960s and 1970s, he published popular novels such as Once There Was a Woman (იყო ერთი ქალი, 1970), Taken Prisoner by Prisoners (ტყვეთა ტყვე, 1975), and a number of stories.

In the 1960s, Ioseliani first tried his hand at screen scripts and theatre plays, resulting, among others, in the comedies Until the Ox-Cart Turns Over (სანამ ურემი გადაბრუნდება, 1969) and Six Old Maids and a Man (ექვსი შინაბერა და ერთი მამაკაცი, 1971), which were successful enough to fill the theatres in East Berlin.

Ioseliani died on 14 July 2011 at the age of 81. He was buried in the yard of his own house in his native Gvishtibi according to the will of the late writer. Among his awards was Georgia's Order of Honor.
