= Vakhtang Orbeliani =

Georgian Romanticist poet and soldier

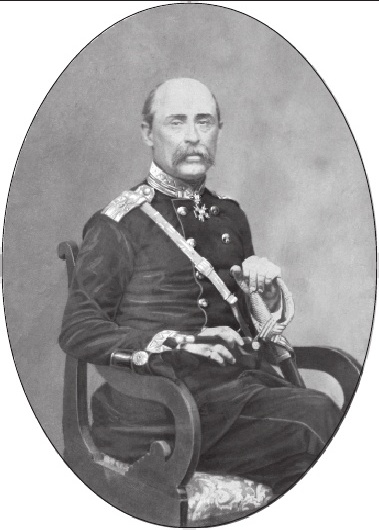

Prince Vakhtang Orbeliani (Georgian: ვახტანგ ორბელიანი; 5 April 1812 – 29 September 1890) was a Georgian Romanticist poet and soldier in the Imperial Russian service, of the noble House of Orbeliani.

Vakhtang Orbeliani was born in Tiflis (Tbilisi), then under Imperial Russian rule, to Prince Vakhtang Orbeliani and Princess Tekle, a beloved daughter of the penultimate Georgian king Erekle II. He was a brother of Alexander Orbeliani and a cousin of Grigol Orbeliani, fellow Romanticist poets. He studied at the Tiflis nobility school and enrolled into the St. Petersburg Page Corps which he did not graduate from and returned to homeland to lead a failed coup attempt against Russian rule in 1832. The conspirators planned to invite the Russian officials in the Caucasus to a grand ball where they would be given the choice of death or surrender. After the collapse of this plot, Orbeliani was arrested and sentenced to death, but reprieved and exiled to Kaluga. The abortive uprising and relatively mild punishment that followed forced many conspirators to see the independent past as irremediably lost and to reconcile themselves with the Russian autocracy, transforming their laments for the lost past and the fall of the native dynasty into Romanticist poetry. In 1838, Orbeliani joined the Russian military service and served in the Nizhny Novgorod Dragoon regiment. Most of his military career was spent in the struggle against the rebellious mountainous tribes during the Caucasus War. He was placed in command of the Georgian Grenadier Regiment in 1855 and promoted to major general in 1860. Between 1858 and 1863, he carried out various administrative and military duties in the North Caucasus, including being commander in the restive districts of Kabarda and Terek. Later in his career, he served as a member of peasants’ council and worked as an arbitrator.

Like his elder brother Alexander’s, his poetry is obsessed with the destruction of the Georgian monarchy at the end of the 18th century, and the poet seeks console in a Christian patience. His best poetry is dominated by the sacred image of Georgian Christianity — Grapevine cross of St. Nino. Vakhtang Orbeliani is buried in the western corner of Tbilisi Sioni Cathedral.
