= Alexander Orbeliani =

Georgian writer

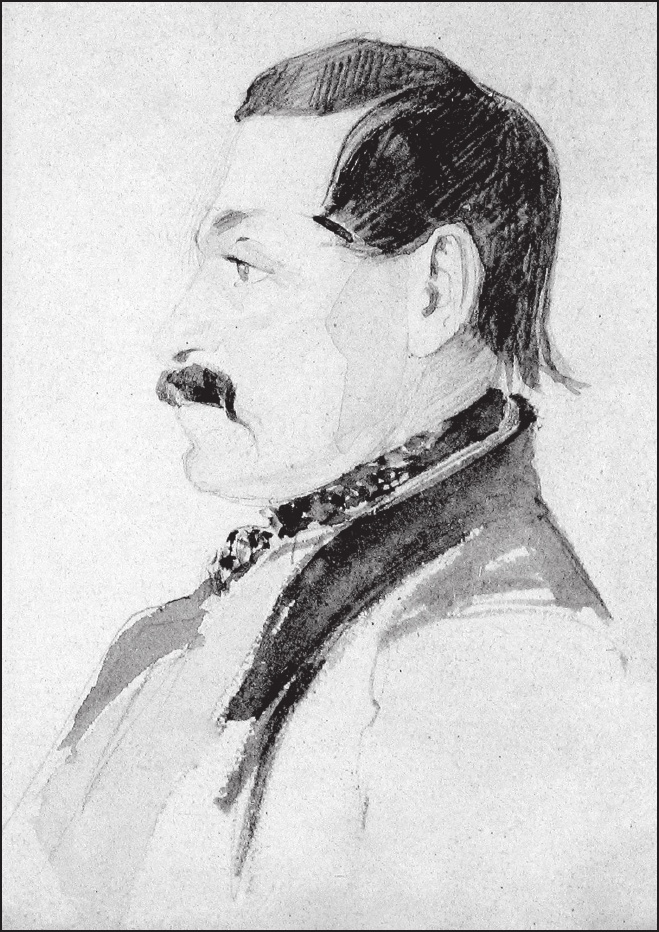
Alexander Orbeliani. 1840s.

Prince Alexander Orbeliani (Jambakur-Orbeliani) (Georgian: ალექსანდრე ორბელიანი [ჯამბაკურ-ორბელიანი]) (24 May 1802 – 28 December 1869) was a Georgian Romanticist poet, playwright, journalist and historian, of the noble House of Orbeliani.

Alexander Orbeliani was born in Tiflis (Tbilisi), then under Imperial Russian rule, to Prince Vakhtang Orbeliani and Princess Tekle, a beloved daughter of the penultimate Georgian king Erekle II. In 1817, he joined the Russian military service. However, together with his mother and his brother Vakhtang, he led a failed coup attempt against Russian rule in 1832. The conspirators planned to invite the Russian officials in the Caucasus to a grand ball where they would be given the choice of death or surrender. After the collapse of this plot, Orbeliani was arrested and exiled to Orenburg whence he would not be able to return until 1840. The abortive uprising and relatively mild punishment that followed forced many conspirators to see the independent past as irremediably lost and to reconcile themselves with the Russian autocracy, transforming their laments for the lost past and the fall of the native dynasty into Romanticist poetry. Orbeliani's most coherent pieces are the allegorical poem of 1832, The Moon (მთოვარე), and a patriotic short story Immaculate Blood (უმანკო სისხლი) about three sisters, nuns, who prefer death to apostasy when the commander of invading Persian troops demands it; the latter is so impressed that he has to die with them. Orbeliani also attempted a series of plays, but his interest in the press was more important. He was a founding member of the editorial board of Tsiskari, which for several years was the backbone of the Georgian periodical press. Through it Orbeliani channeled his efforts to standardize a literary language, based on revival of archaic forms. He was also one of the first Georgian writers to take an interest in retrieving folk poetry from the people, and authored several works on Georgian history and culture.
