= Grigol Maisuradze =

Georgian artist (1817–1885)

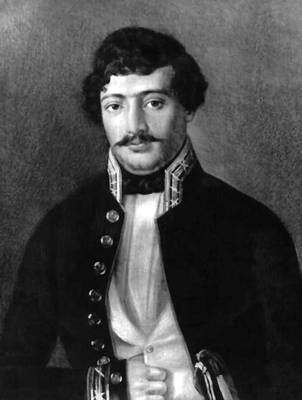
Grigol Maisuradze, Portrait of N. Chichinadze. 1853

Grigol (Giorgi) Maisuradze (Georgian: გრიგოლ [გიორგი] მაისურაძე) (1817–1885) was a Georgian painter and a founder of realistic school in the Georgian portraiture.

Maisuradze was born in Tsinandali into the family of serf of Prince Alexander Chavchavadze, a poet and general in the Imperial Russian service. In 1836, Chavchavadze emancipated Maisuradze and sponsored his education in St. Petersburg where he studied under guidance of Karl Bryullov. In the 1850s he returned to his native Georgia and taught painting in Kutaisi where he died in 1885. Most of his works have been lost.

== Bibliography ==
- Kvaskhvadze, Shalva (1985), At the beginnings of Georgian Realistic Pictorial Portraits. Tbilisi: Sabchota Sakartvelo
