= Emil Augsburg =

German SS functionary

- Born: May 1, 1904; Łódź, Congress Poland
- Died: March 1, 1981 (aged 76); Gräfelfing, West Germany
- Occupation: Intelligence officer
- Employer(s): Sicherheitsdienst (SD); Wannsee Institut; Einsatzgruppe B RSHA; US military counter-intelligence (1947–1948); Gehlen Organization (1949–1966)
- Known for: SS functionary; Nazi war criminal

Emil Augsburg (born 1 May 1904 in Łódź; died 1 March 1981 in Gräfelfing) was a German SS functionary and Nazi war criminal.

== Career ==
Emil Augsburg was born in Congress Poland in 1904 and learned to speak fluent Polish and Russian.

"Studious and dedicated, Augsburg earned a doctorate three decades later studying about the press in the Soviet Union. In 1934 he joined the SD; membership in the SS followed. In 1937, Augsburg became associated with the Wannsee Institut." Between 1939 and 1941 he worked for the Security Police. As part of his duties in World War II, Augsburg was responsible for planning the SS executions of Jews and other "enemies of the Reich" in occupied Poland. Augsburg was later a member of the Vorkommando Moskau for Einsatzgruppe B. During Operation Barbarossa, he participated in mass executions of Jews, communists, and partisans in Smolensk.

"After Augsburg was wounded in an air attack in Smolensk in September 1941, he returned to Berlin to conduct research on Eastern European matters. The RSHA foreign intelligence branch formally absorbed the Wannsee Institute in 1943." He interrogated Soviet prisoners of war for Operation Zeppelin.

Just before the war ended Augsburg hid at a Benedictine cloister in Ettal, Germany. There he joined a sympathetic Polish monsignor and the pair escaped to the Vatican in Rome.

== Postwar ==
After the war, Augsburg was tried in absentia by the Polish People's Republic authorities. He escaped punishment because from 1947-1948 he was employed by an American military counter-intelligence agency as an expert on Soviet affairs.

After 1949 he worked for West German intelligence under Reinhard Gehlen.

"By the late 1950s, it was known that Soviet agents were trying to contact Augsburg. In the early 1960s, many people operating in intelligence circles believed Augsburg was working as a double agent.... He was increasingly viewed as a liability and a record of his nefarious wartime activities was compiled to force his quiet resignation. In 1966 Augsburg was dismissed for "unauthorized intelligence activities."

== Literature ==
- Kenneth A. Alford & Theodore P. Savas, Nazi Millionaires: The Allied Search for Hidden SS Gold (Casemate; 2002) ISBN 0-9711709-6-7
- Höhne, Heinz. Der Orden unter dem Totenkopf, (English translation entitled : The Order of the Death's Head, The Story of Hitler's SS) London: Pan Books Ltd. (1969)
- Koehl, Robert Lewis. The Black Corps University of Wisconsin Press, (1983)
- Reitlinger, Gerald. The SS: Alibi of a Nation 1922-1945. Viking (Da Capo reprint), New York (1957). ISBN 0-306-80351-8
