= Shalva (disambiguation) =

Shalva is a settlement in southern Israel.

Shalva may also refer to:

- SHALVA, The Israel Association for Care and Inclusion of Persons with Disabilities
- Shalva Band, Israeli band consisting of five disabled musicians
- Shalva (given name), Georgina masculine given name
- Şəlvə, Lachin, village in Azerbaijan
- Shalva (Mahabharata), a character in Mahabharata
