= Mikheil Natroshvili =

Georgian Red Army soldier and Author

- მიხეილ ნატროშვილი
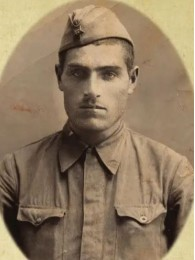
- Mikhail Natroshvili wearing his Red Army uniform, 1941.
- Born: 1915; Zemo Machkhaani
- Died: 2000 (aged 84–85)
- Other name: Mikhail Natroshvili
- Citizenship: Soviet Union, Georgian Soviet Socialist Republic
- Education: Tserkumsi (literacy elimination courses)
- Occupations: Red army soldier, Georgian Legion (1941-1945) soldier, Farmer, Writer
- Years active: 1941–1952
- Known for: Fighting in WWII on both the Soviet and German sides.
- Notable work: "My Adventure" or "My Journey" (ჩემი თავგადასავალი), 2000.

Mikheil Natroshvili (Georgian: მიხეილ ნატროშვილი, Russian: Михаил Натрошвили) was a Georgian Red Army soldier and Author. Natroshvili was born in 1915 to a poor peasant family living in rural Georgia, at the time a part of the Russian Empire. Natroshvili was born in the Village of Zemo Machkhaani in the Signagi district of Kakheti. As the son of a farmer he helped out in the farming of crops with his family, while growing up he moved to a few other villages.

In 1941 Natroshvili was Conscripted into the "Workers and Peasants" Red Army to fight in World War II, at the time Operation Barbarossa had started and the Soviet Union joined the war against Nazi Germany. In his book "my adventure", Mikheil described his time in the army, he specifically described the presence of the Soviet army, discipline, food and various other topics which interested him. His memoirs were written in great detail.

== Early life ==
Mikheil Natroshvili was born in the village of Zemo Machkhaani (Upper Machkhaani), this village was located in the district of Sighnaghi district which is today the area around Signagi in Kakheti. Natroshvili received his elementary education at "Tserkumsi" (literacy elimination courses) and could not continue his studies in accounting courses due to World War I going on and then the Russian Civil War. While he was in kindergarten, the Georgian nationalists led by Noe Zhordania were fighting against the Bolsheviks with the White Army, in 1918 they declared independence from the newly formed Russian Soviet Federative Socialist Republic. Natroshvilis family largely supported the Social Democratic Party of Georgia and it was known that his father was a Menshevik. In February 1921 the government was forced to retreat for a while and they evacuated Tbilisi. The Bolsheviks invaded Georgia and took over the country in less than a month, although rebels and resistance movements were fighting smaller Guerrilla wars later on. In his memoirs, Natroshvili recalled in detail how the village was confused at that time and how the elder Bolshevik Filipp Makharadze appeared to them, trying to calm the community from the balcony of the former house of the kulaks. After the occupation in 1921 the situation of his family fundamentally changed, Natroshvilis Menshevik father was forced to quit his job at a cattle slaughterhouse in Tbilisi and return to the village because of the Bolshevik takeover.

== Fighting in World War II ==
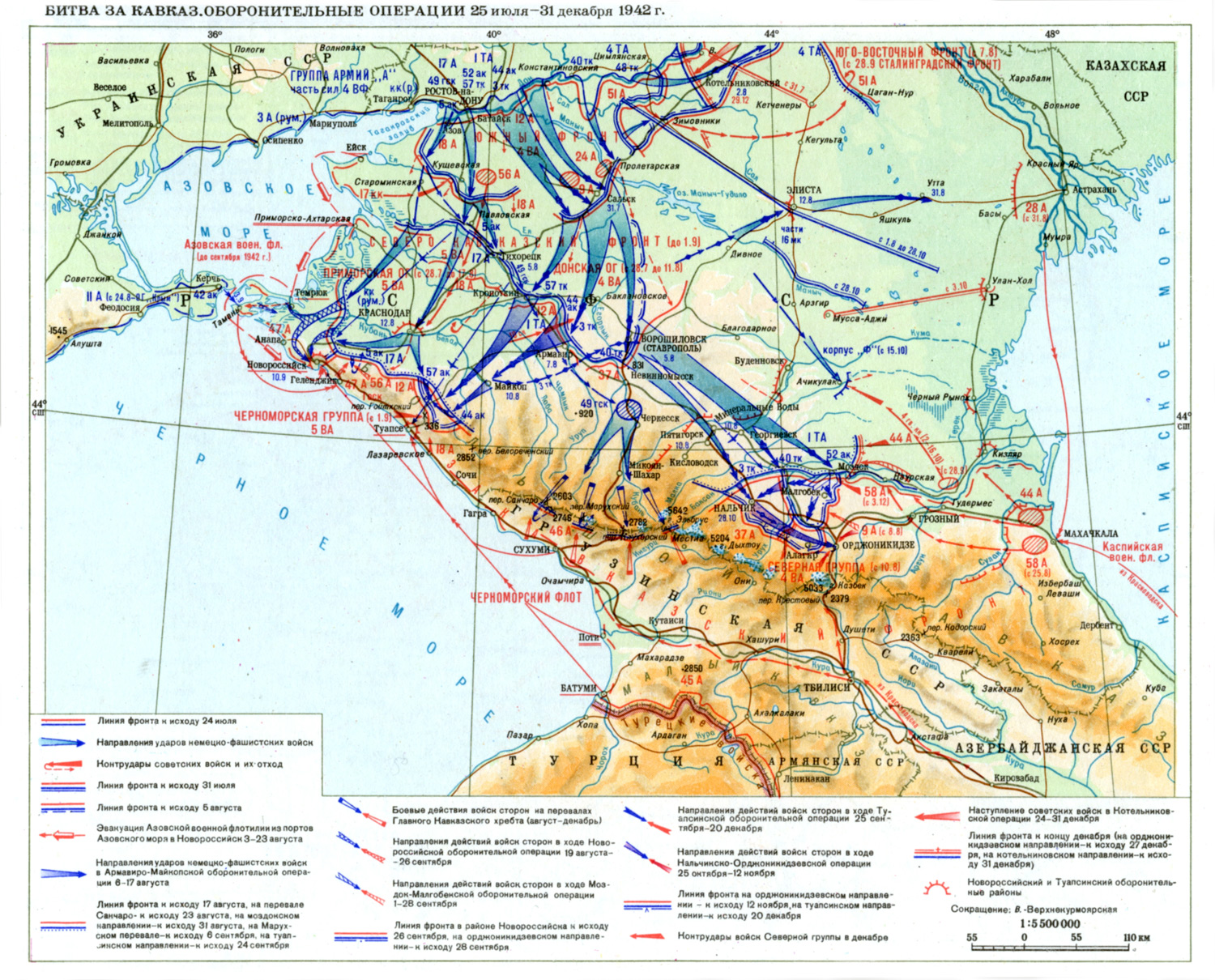
Map of the Battle of the Caucasus. Natroshvili was caught on the front lines of 1942.

In 1941, 26-year-old Mikheil Natroshvili, a citizen of the Soviet Union, was drafted into the ranks of the Workers' and Peasants' Red Army in the Second World War. On June 21, 1941, Nazi German troops crossed the borders of the Soviet Union thus starting Operation Barbarossa. The USSR officially entered the war with Germany. Mass mobilization started in the country. Many young people signed up as volunteers. Many found "necessary" contacts and avoided going to war. Mikheil Natroshvili was neither a volunteer nor would he have access to this necessary acquaintance. He was simply drafted into the army. In his memoirs he described how his "long adventure" began at the time of his conscription. He also described in detail everything that was important and interesting to him; The presence of the Soviet army, discipline, food, the movement of its units, the losses received in the battles, the quality of the equipment, the level of knowledge of the Russian language among the Georgians, the reasons for the creation of national divisions in the Soviet army, etc.

=== Capture in the North Caucasus ===
Natroshvili was captured during the fighting in the North Caucasus around the area of Circassia in 1942 when the Wehrmacht was being pushed back. He was captured along with a huge mass of other soldiers, the Germans moved him from one Concentration camp to another. He was "recruited" to the side of the Nazis in the Georgievsky camps. He continued his military service in the Georgian battalion of the Wehrmacht called the Georgian Legion (1941–1945), which was mainly composed of ethnic Georgians. At first, the German troops achieved dizzying success, but after the defeat in the Battle of Stalingrad, in 1943, the Germans began a great retreat. Mikheil Natroshvili left with them first the Caucasus, then the Crimean peninsula and finally the borders of the Soviet Union located near the Ukrainian SSR. After that, he did not take part in hostilities. Together with some other Georgian soldiers, he was transferred to Vichy France, where he was assigned to the supply service of the German army. During the war, Mikhail was wounded once, and due to the second severe wound, he had to stay in the hospital for a long time. During the war, he traveled across Europe, in Central and West Europe while transporting supplies for the army.

== Arrest and imprisonment in the Gulag camps ==
Natroshvili, on his way home, while crossing the Romania–Moldavian SSR border, instead of Kizig, he was arrested and convicted of "betrayal of the motherland" and taken to the borders of Japan. He was deported along with other Prisoners of war to Sakhalin Island, where he was forced to work at a Gulag camp in the gold mines. Mikheil returned home after seven years of being imprisoned, having to overcome many obstacles to become financially secure for his family. He started writing his memoirs after the Dissolution of the Soviet Union in 1991. Records showed that he wrote for a long time and slowly recalled his journey. His memoirs are not written in proper literary Georgian. He wrote everything about Kizikur Kilo, in these memoirs, not only the political and social events that happened before his eyes are preserved in the memory of one person, but also unique linguistic material is recorded here, which is a valuable source of the Kizikur dialect.

== See also ==
- Vasil Kvachantiradze
- Battle of the Caucasus
- Georgian Legion (1941–1945)
- Red Army
