= Shalva (given name) =

- Gender: Male
- Language: Georgian

Origin
- Region of origin: Georgia

Shalva (Georgian: შალვა) is a Georgian masculine given name. Notable people with the name include:

- Shalva of Akhaltsikhe (fl. 13th century), Georgian military commander and courtier
- Shalva Aleksi-Meskhishvili (1884-1960), Georgian jurist and politician
- Shalva Amiranashvili (1899–1975), Georgian art historian
- Shalva Apkhazava (1980-2004), Georgian footballer
- Shalva Chikhladze (1912-1997), Georgian wrestler and Olympic medalist
- Shalva Dadiani (1874-1959), Georgian novelist, playwright and theatre actor
- Shalva Didebashvili (born 1982), Georgian rugby player
- Shalva Eliava (1883–1937), Soviet-Georgian Old Bolshevik and Soviet official
- Shalva Gachechiladze (born 1987), Georgian show jumper
- Shalva Gadabadze (born 1984), Georgian-Azerbaijani wrestler
- Shalva Khujadze (born 1975), Georgian footballer
- Shalva Kikodze (1894-1921), Georgian painter, graphic artist and theatre decorator
- Shalva Loladze (1916–1945), Soviet-Georgian officer in the German Wehrmacht
- Shalva Maglakelidze (1893-1976), Georgian jurist, politician and military commander
- Shalva Mamukashvili (born 1990), Georgian rugby player
- Shalva Mumladze (born 1978), Georgian footballer
- Shalva Natelashvili (born 1958), Georgian politician
- Shalva Nutsubidze (1888-1969), Georgian philosopher, translator and public benefactor
- Shalva Sutiashvili (born 1984), Georgian rugby player
