= Oude Scheld – Texel Island =

Painting by Clarkson Stanfield

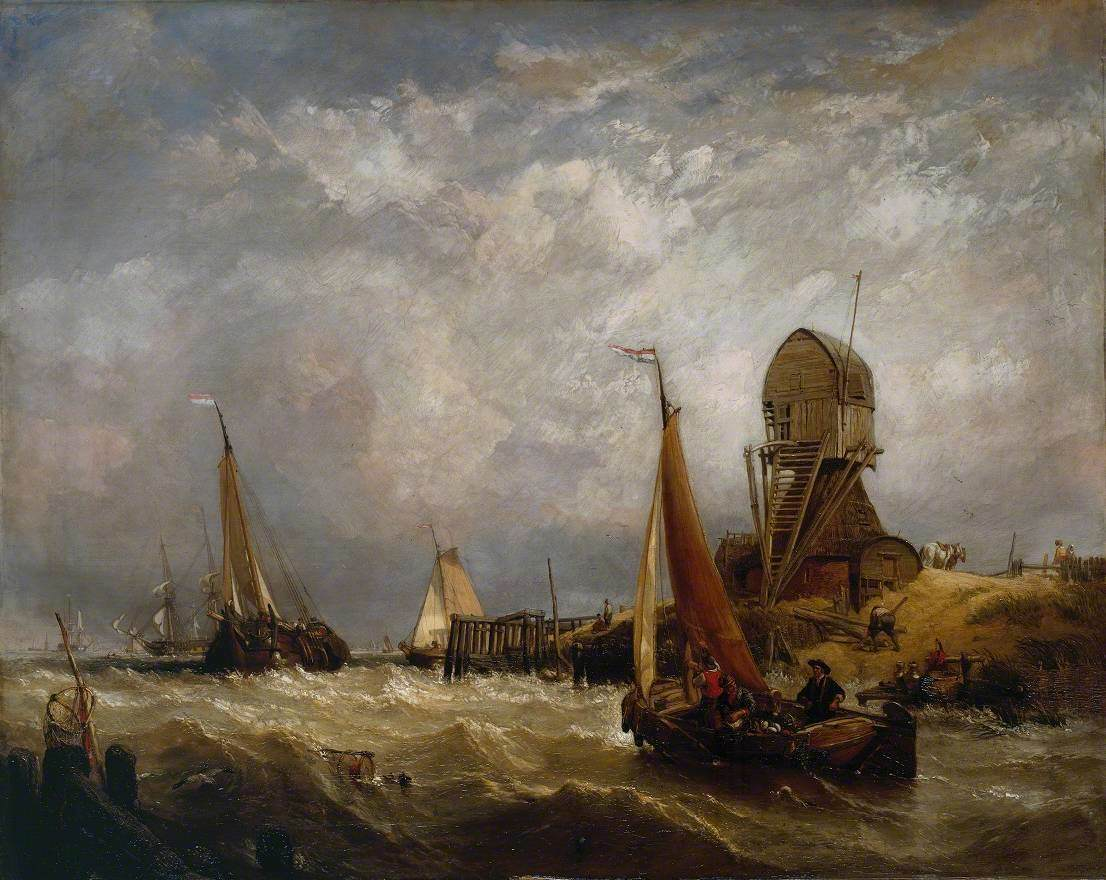
- Artist: Clarkson Stanfield
- Year: 1844
- Medium: Oil on canvas, landscape painting
- Dimensions: 125.7 cm × 103. cm (49.5 in × 41 in)
- Location: Tate Britain, London

Oude Scheld – Texel Island is an 1844 landscape painting by the British artist Clarkson Stanfield. It features a view of the village of Oudeschild on Texel off the coast of Holland. It is also known by the longer title Oude Scheld – Texel Island, Looking towards Nieuwe Diep and the Zuider Zee.

A former sailor Stanfield was a leading artist of the early Victorian era, often compared to J.M.W. Turner. He was known for his Romantic seascapes and produced numerous views of the Netherlands. This painting was inspired by a visit he had made to Holland the previous year. One critic praised the "astonishing movement and clearness of the water, which is painted with a triumphant challenge to the closest comparison with nature, even to the beading on the crests of the waves".

Stanfield displayed the painting at the Royal Academy Exhibition of 1844 held at the National Gallery in London. It was acquired by the art collector Robert Vernon and in 1847 was donated by him to the nation as part of the large Vernon Gift. Today it is in the collection of the Tate Britain in Pimlico.

An engraving based on the painting was produced by Robert Kent Thomas, a copy of which is now held by the British Museum.

== Bibliography ==
- Van der Merwe, Pieter & Took, Roger. The Spectacular career of Clarkson Stanfield. Tyne and Wear County Council Museums, 1979.
- Wright, Christopher, Gordon, Catherine May & Smith, Mary Peskett. British and Irish Paintings in Public Collections: An Index of British and Irish Oil Paintings by Artists Born Before 1870 in Public and Institutional Collections in the United Kingdom and Ireland. Yale University Press, 2006.
