= Michael Achmeteli =

Georgian émigré scholar & Nazi sympathiser (1895-1963)

Michael Achmeteli (Georgian: მიხეილ ახმეტელი, Mikheil Akhmeteli) (1895–1963) was a Georgian émigré scholar, an expert on Soviet agriculture and sometime chief of Wannsee Institut, the SS-controlled research institute of Soviet studies in Nazi Germany.

Born in Borjomi, south-central Georgia, then part of the Russian Empire, Achmeteli studied at the University of Kharkiv between 1915 and 1917 and was sponsored by the government of the newly independent Georgia to continue his studies at the University of Jena in 1919. The Soviet takeover of Georgia precluded him from returning to his homeland. Achmeteli obtained a doctorate at Jena in 1925 and joined the Institute of Eastern Europe in Breslau (now Wrocław, Poland) in 1926. In 1937, the Nazi leadership transformed part of this institute into its own research institution located near Berlin, the Wannsee Institut. Achmeteli was made the director of this new institute. He was initially on friendly terms with Alfred Rosenberg and the authorities expected him to provide the expertise on Soviet economy. Under the pseudonym Konstantin Michael, he wrote a book on Soviet agriculture and forced collectivization. He was dismissed as the chief of Wannsee Institut in 1940. During the World War II years, he chaired a Berlin-based Georgian National Committee, which focused on delivering Soviet Georgian POWs from the Nazi concentration camps through recruiting them into the Georgian Legion. After the war, Achmeteli settled in Munich and worked as professor at the Ludwig-Maximilians-Universität München (LMU). He remained in opposition to the Soviet rule in Georgia and participated in the Anti-Bolshevik Bloc of Nations.

== Bibliography ==
- Die wirtschaftliche Bedeutung Transkaukasiens mit besonderer Berücksichtigung Georgiens. (″The Economic Importance of Transcaucasia under Special Consideration of Georgia″) Dissertation, University of Jena 1924.
- Das Gesetz des abnehmenden Ertragszuwachses und seine gegenwärtige Beurteilung. (″The Law of Diminishing Returns and its Current Assessment″) Dissertation, University of Breslau 1932.
- Die Agrarpolitik der Sowjet-Union und deren Ergebnisse. (″The Agrarian Policy of the Soviet Union and its Results″, as Konstantin Michael) Nibelungen-Verlag Berlin 1936.
- Bauern unterm Sowjetstern. (″Farmers under the Soviet Star″, as Konstantin Michael) Blut und Boden-Verlag Goslar 1938.
