= Oudeschild =

- Village
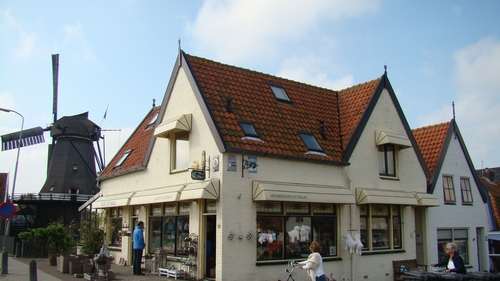
- Village of Oudeschild

- Location in the Netherlands Location in the province of North Holland in the Netherlands
- Coordinates: 53°2′46″N 4°50′59″E
- Country: Netherlands
- Province: North Holland
- Municipality: Texel

Area
  - Total: 1.10 km^{2} (0.42 sq mi)
- Elevation: 0.3 m (0.98 ft)

Population (2025)
  - Total: 1,305
  - Density: 1,190/km^{2} (3,070/sq mi)
- Time zone: UTC+1 (CET)
  - Summer (DST): UTC+2 (CEST)
- Postal code: 1792
- Dialing code: 0222

Oudeschild is a village in the Dutch province of North Holland. It is a part of the island municipality of Texel, and lies about 12 km northeast of Den Helder.

Oudeschild is the fishing harbour of the island. It is situated at the Wadden Sea dyke. Next to the harbour, the windmill Traanroeier marks the site of the Maritime and Beachcombers Museum, which exhibits an interesting collection of objects found on the beaches of Texel.

In the 17th century, the Dutch East India Company ships sailing from Amsterdam waited for favourable winds at the Rede van Texel, on the sea near Oudeschild.

Close to the village is the Hoge Berg (the so-called "High Mountain"), a 15-metre-high (49 ft) hill. Near the Hoge Berg is the Russian cemetery. Here lie the Georgians who died in their uprising in 1945.

== Gallery ==
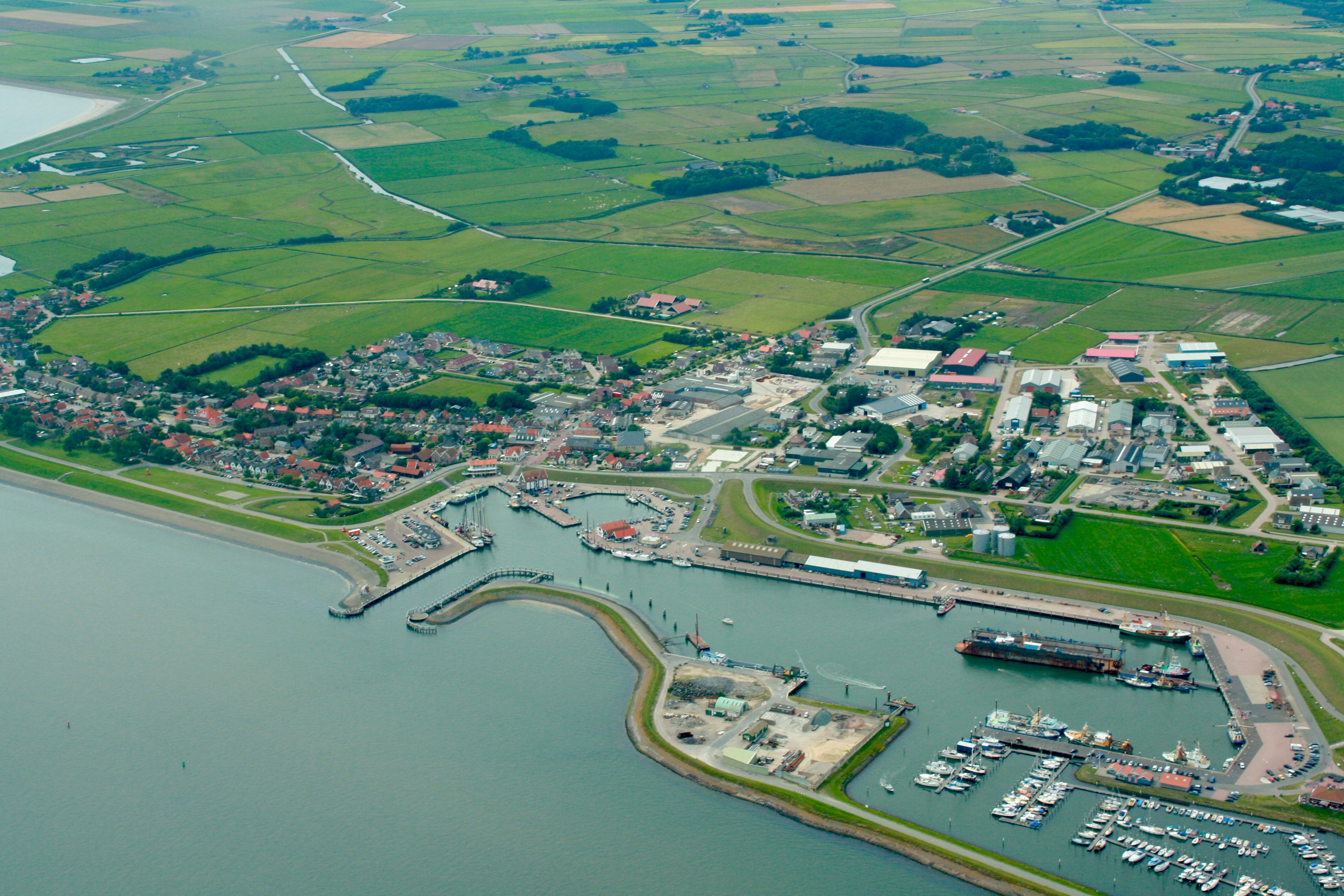
Aerial view of Oudeschild

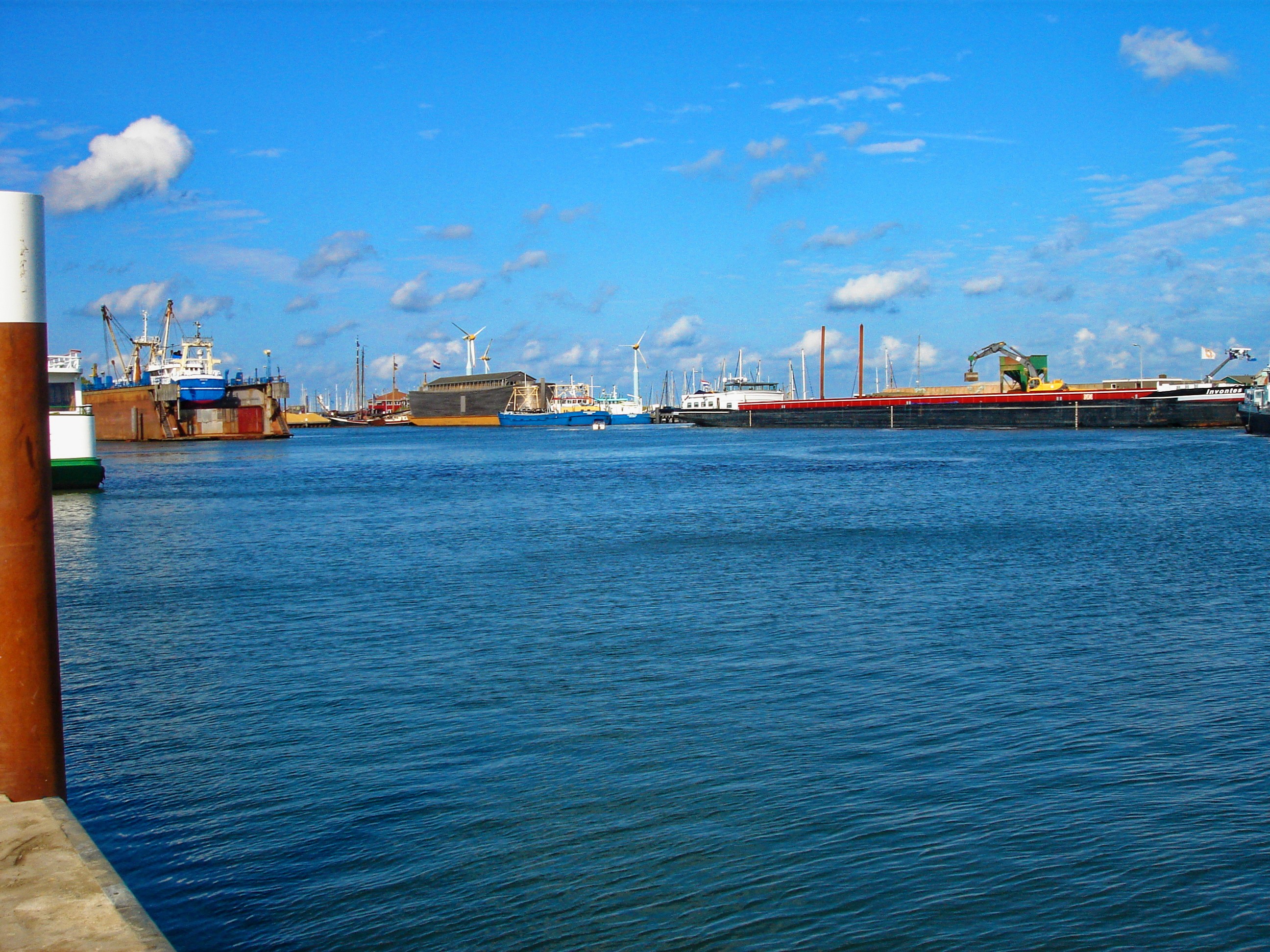
Harbour of Oudeschild

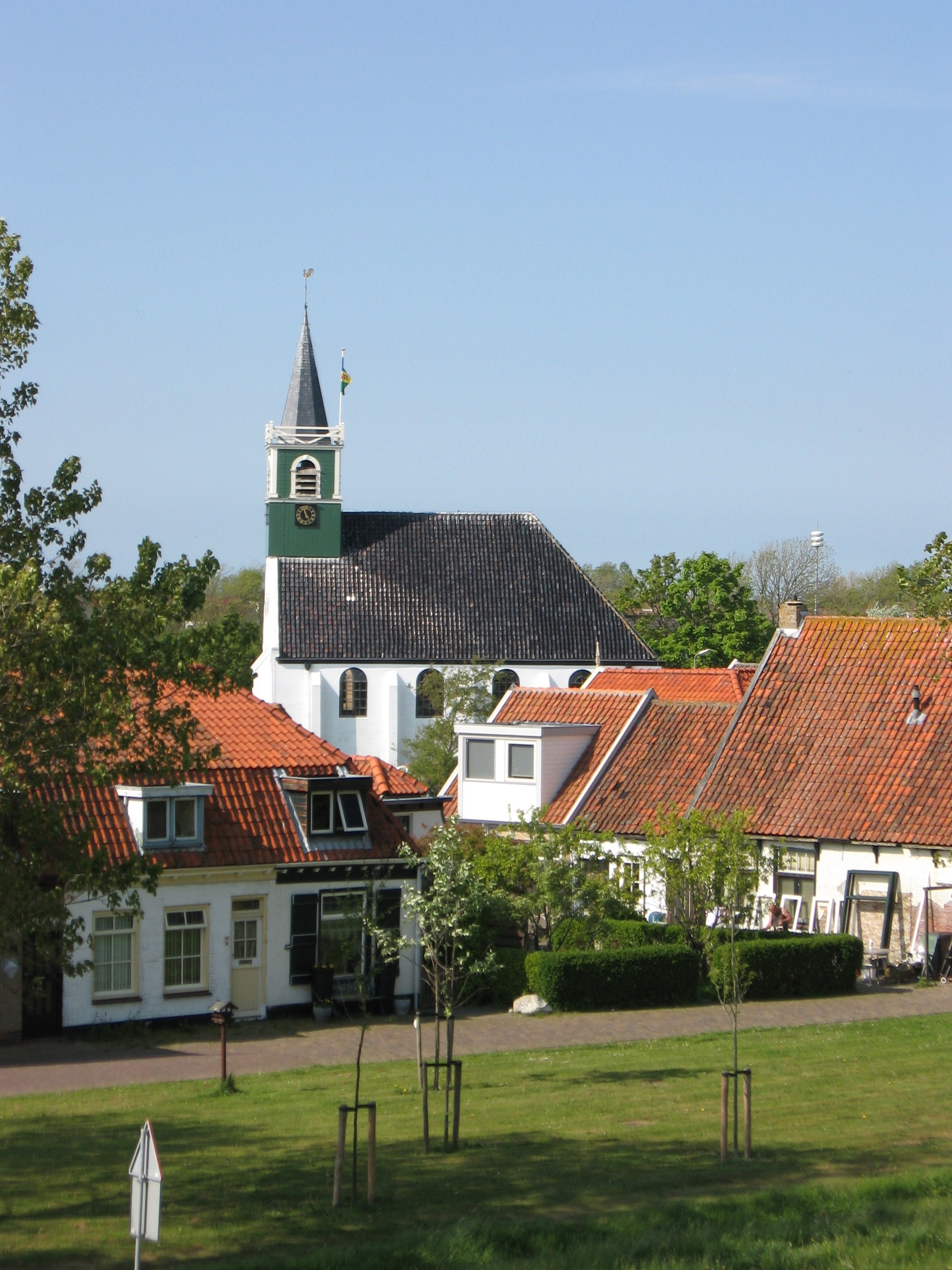
Dutch Reformed Church

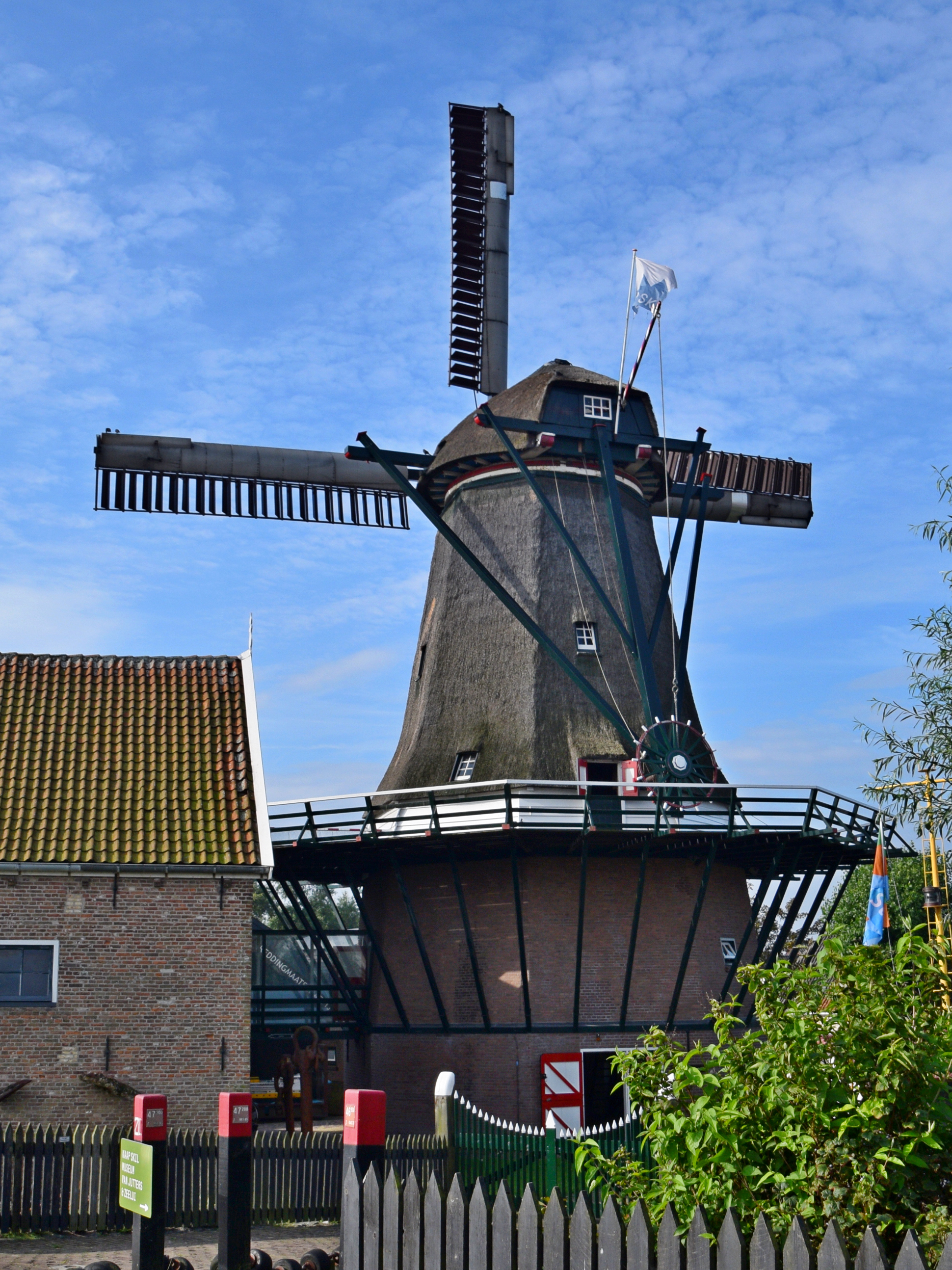
Windmill Traanroeier

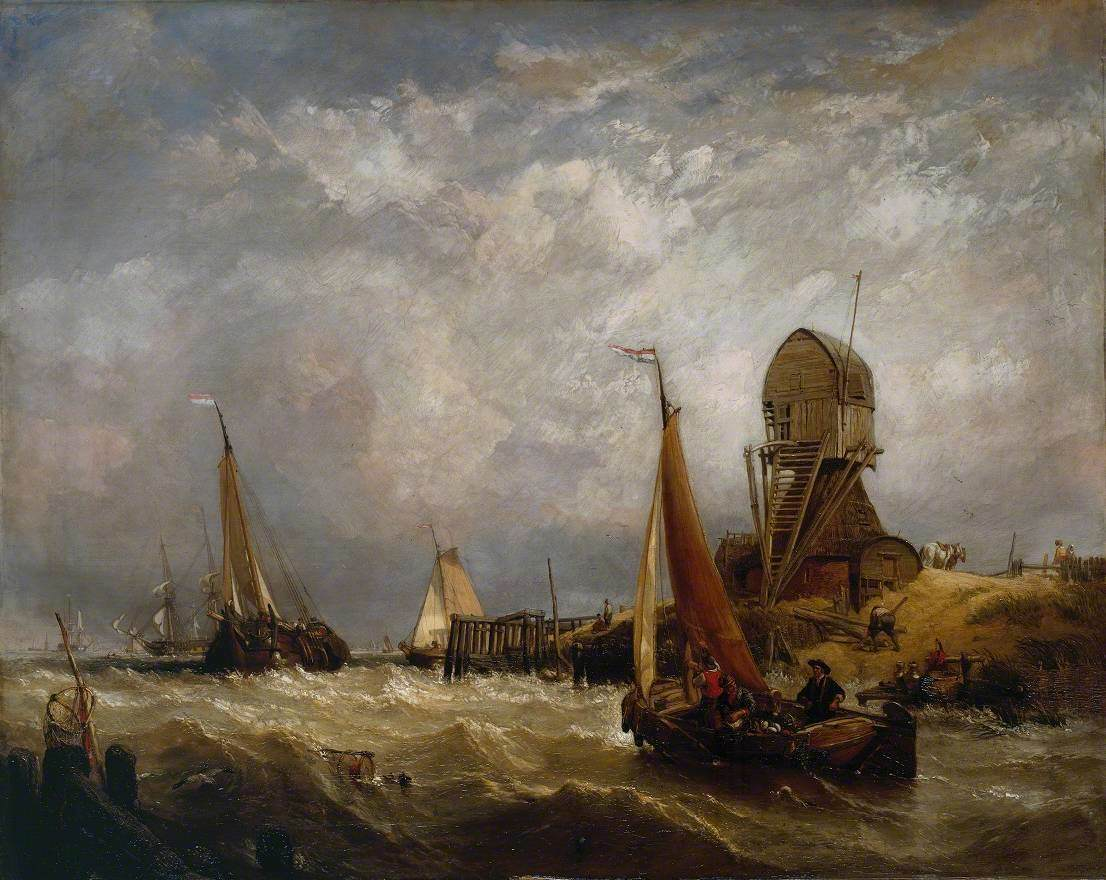
Oude Scheld – Texel Island by Clarkson Stanfield, 1844
