= Shalva Loladze =

Soviet Air Force officer (1916–1945)

- შალვა ლოლაძე
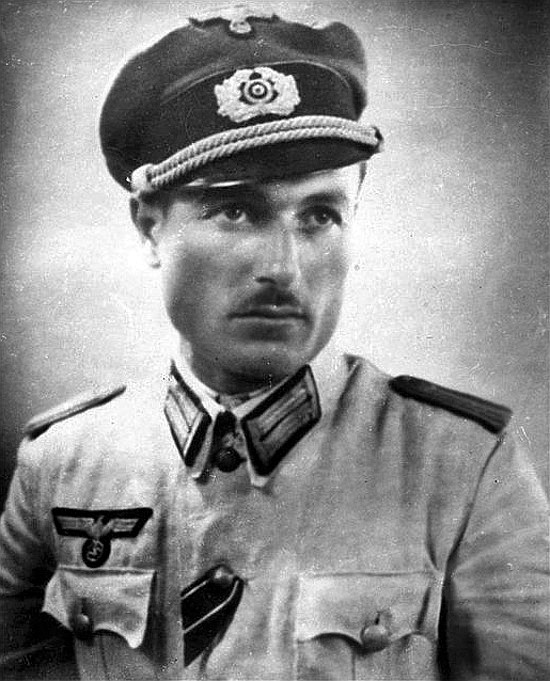
- Loladze in German uniform
- Born: 16 April 1916; Caucasus Krai, Russian Empire
- Died: 25 April 1945 (aged 29); Texel, Netherlands
- Military career
- Allegiance: Soviet Union; Nazi Germany: Georgian Legion
- Branch: Soviet Air Forces; German Army
- Unit: 882nd Infantry Battalion
- Conflicts: World War II; Texel uprising †

Shalva Loladze (Georgian: შალვა ლოლაძე) (16 April 1916 – 25 April 1945) was a former Soviet Georgian POW and an officer in the German Wehrmacht who headed a revolt of the Georgian soldiers against the German commandership on the Dutch island of Texel.

Loladze served in the Soviet military at the outbreak of World War II. In 1942, he was a Soviet Air Force captain and an air squadron commander. His airplane was shot down over Ukraine and Loladze was captured by the Germans. He then joined the Georgische Legion of the Wehrmacht and served in the 882nd Infantry Battalion Königin Tamara with the rank of Leutnant (second lieutenant). The battalion was deployed on the German-occupied Dutch island of Texel in the closing months of World War II. On the night of 5-6 April 1945 Loladze led an insurrection of the battalion's Georgian personnel. Loladze was killed in fighting on 25 April 1945.

He is buried together with his comrades-in-arms at the Georgian War Cemetery of Texel which has been given Loladze's name.
