= Rede van Texel =

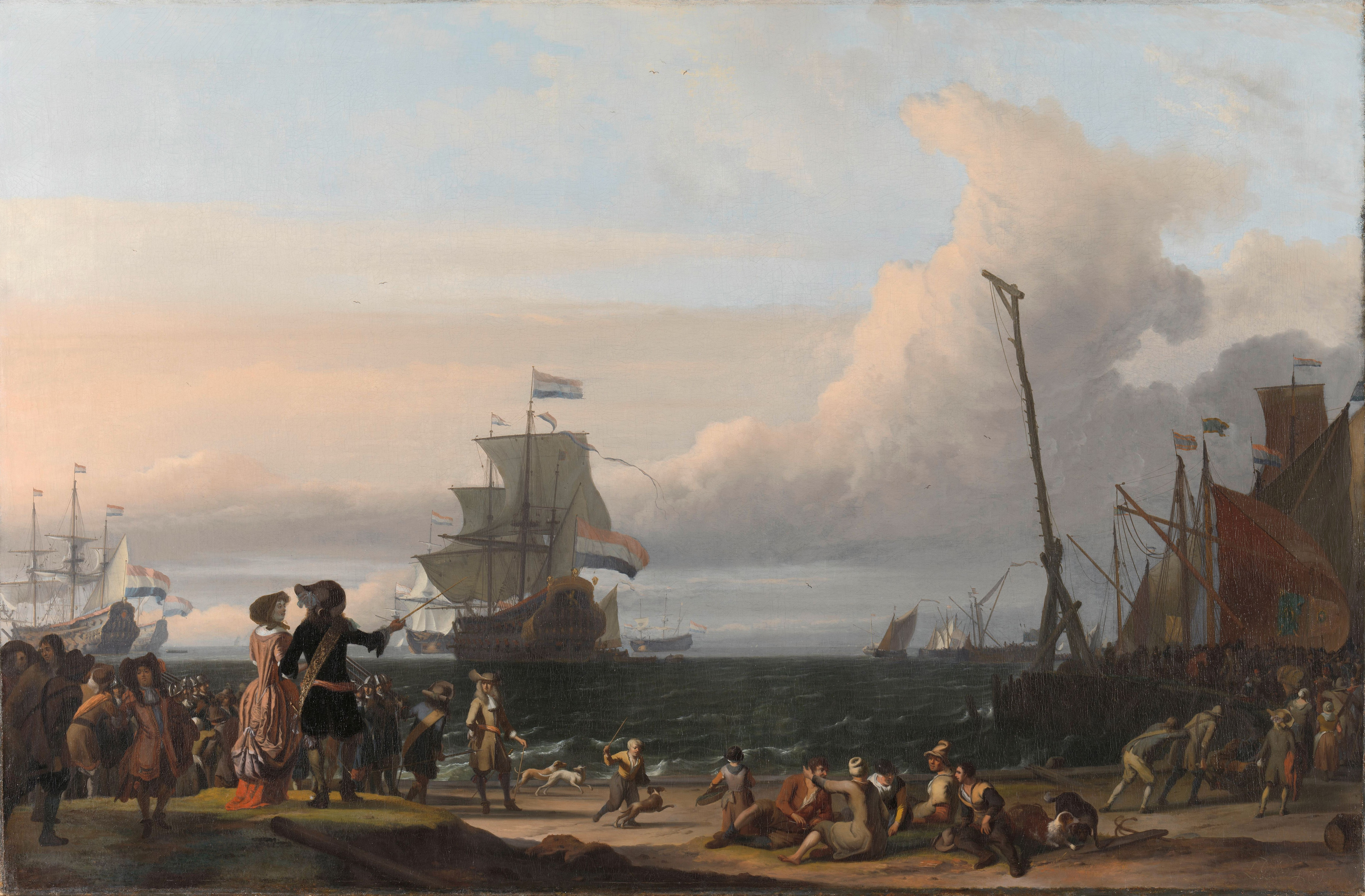
Nederlandse schepen op de rede van Texel, a 1671 painting by Ludolf Bakhuizen

The Rede van Texel, formerly Reede van Texel, was a roadstead off the Dutch island of Texel. It was of considerable importance to Dutch long-distance shipping between roughly 1500 and 1800. The Rede van Texel was located off the east side of the island, near the town of Oudeschild.

== Functions ==
At the roadstead ships from cities around the Zuiderzee safely anchored and waited for favourable sailing conditions, hired pilots and picked up provisions and sometimes additional crewmembers. A lot of transloading was done at the Rede van Texel, as the shoals of the Zuiderzee prevented most ships from sailing to and from their ports fully laden.

The ships anchoring at the Rede van Texel, sometimes up to 150 together, were mainly merchantmen, most notably from the Dutch East India Company, but also whalers and war ships. For the island of Texel the roadstead meant a substantial source of income.

=== Safety ===
The safety that the roadstead provided was only relative. Frequently storms would damage or sink ships, sometimes dozens in one day. Some 44 fully laden merchantmen were lost on Christmas Eve 1593, littering the east coast of Texel with bodies and wreckage. The Dutch merchant and poet Roemer Visscher suffered a sizeable loss that night and named his third daughter Maria Tesselschade (Texel Damage) after the disaster. In December 1660 upwards of 100 ships may have been lost in a storm at the Rede van Texel. It is estimated that a total of between 500 and 1000 ships were sunk at the roadstead.

In 1574 William the Silent had a fort built near Oudeschild to protect the Rede van Texel, which must have been one of the busiest ports at the time.

== Decline ==
In the course of the nineteenth century the Rede van Texel lost most of its purpose. Both the Fourth Anglo-Dutch War and the French occupation had already been disastrous for Dutch merchant shipping, with a decline of activity at the roadstead in its wake. This was followed by the opening of the Noordhollandsch Kanaal in 1824, bypassing Texel to some extent, and the introduction of the steamship, which didn't have to wait for favourable winds. The opening of the North Sea Canal finished what was left of the roadstead, as ships from the mainport of Amsterdam bypassed Texel altogether.

== Sources ==
- (in Dutch) Vos, A.D. (2012); Onderwaterarcheologie op de Rede van Texel, Nederlandse Archeologische Rapporten 041 (Rijksdienst voor het Cultureel Erfgoed, Amersfoort), p. 37-47.
