= Georgian uprising on Texel =

1945 Georgian uprising in Texel, German-occupied Netherlands

Uprising on Texel
- Part of the Western Front of 1944–45 in the European theatre of World War II
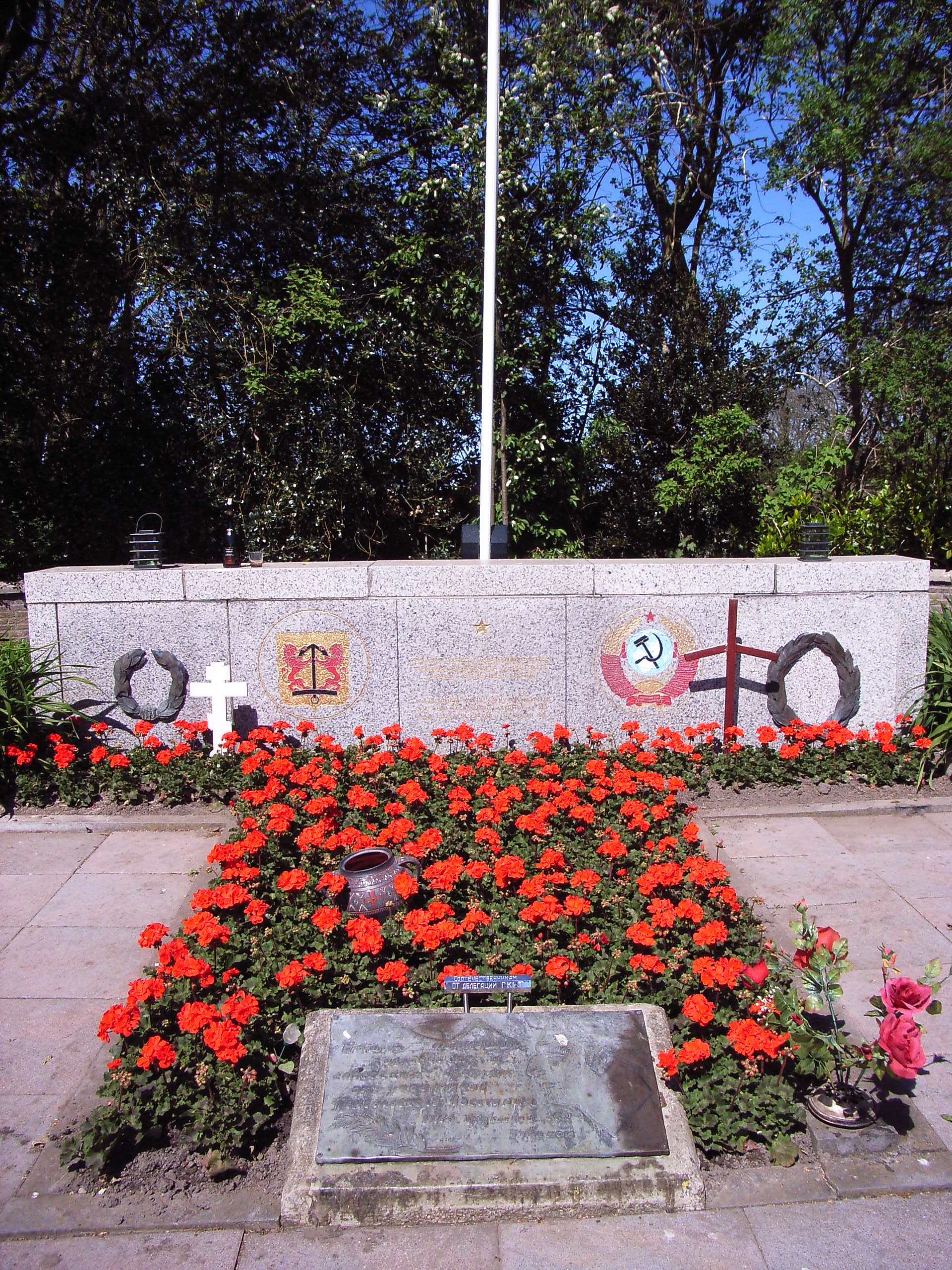
- Georgian military cemetery on Texel
Date	5 April 1945 – 20 May 1945
Location	Texel, Netherlands
Result	Inconclusive

Belligerents
(Democratic Republic of Georgia) Georgian Legion (Netherlands) Dutch resistance Canada	Germany

Commanders and leaders
(Democratic Republic of Georgia) Shalva Loladze † (Netherlands) W.N. Kelder	(Nazi Germany) Klaus Breitner

Casualties and losses
565+ Georgians killed 120 Texel Dutch killed	812+ Germans killed

The Georgian uprising on Texel (Dutch: Opstand der Georgiërs) (5 April 1945 – 20 May 1945) was an insurrection by the 882nd Infantry Battalion Königin Tamara (Queen Tamar or Tamara) of the Georgian Legion of the German Army stationed on the German-occupied Dutch island of Texel (pronounced Tessel in Dutch, and Texel in English, Frisian, and German). The battalion was made up of 800 Georgians and 400 Germans, with mainly German officers. It was one of the last battles in the European theatre.

== Background ==
The heavily fortified island was part of the German Atlantic Wall system of defence. However, after the Allied landings in Normandy it was relegated to relative insignificance. The men of the rebellious battalion were former Red Army soldiers from the Georgian Soviet Socialist Republic captured on the Eastern front. They had been given a choice: the captured soldiers could choose either to remain in the prisoner of war camps, which would have meant abuse, starvation, and very possibly death, or to serve in the German military and be allowed a degree of freedom. The Germans also promised that Georgia would regain its independence from the Soviet Union following a German victory. The battalion was formed of men who chose to accept the German offer. Anti-communist émigrés living in Western Europe also joined these units, such as the Georgian Legion.

The battalion had been formed at Kruszyna near Radom in occupied Poland in June 1943 and was used initially to fight partisans. On 24 August 1943 it was ordered to the West to relieve troops of the Indian Legion. The battalion arrived at Zandvoort in the Netherlands on 30 August. From September 1943 to early February 1945 it was stationed at Zandvoort as part of the "Unterabschnitt Zandvoort". On 6 February 1945, the battalion was posted to Subsection Texel. As it became obvious that Germany was going to lose the war, the Georgians became worried over their potential fates should they return to the Soviet Union as traitors. Soviet collaborators were subjected to forced repatriation under the terms of the Yalta Conference. This was often followed by incarceration and banishment and, for officers, execution. The primary motivation of the uprising was to ensure that the Georgians could present themselves as anti-Nazi fighters rather than collaborators at the war's end and thus escape punishment for treason. Second Lieutenant Shalva Loladze began planning a mutiny which would be executed together with the Dutch resistance as soon as the time was deemed right. In late March 1945, preparations began for the transfer of several companies of the Georgian battalion to the Dutch mainland to oppose Allied advances, triggering the rebellion.

== Uprising ==
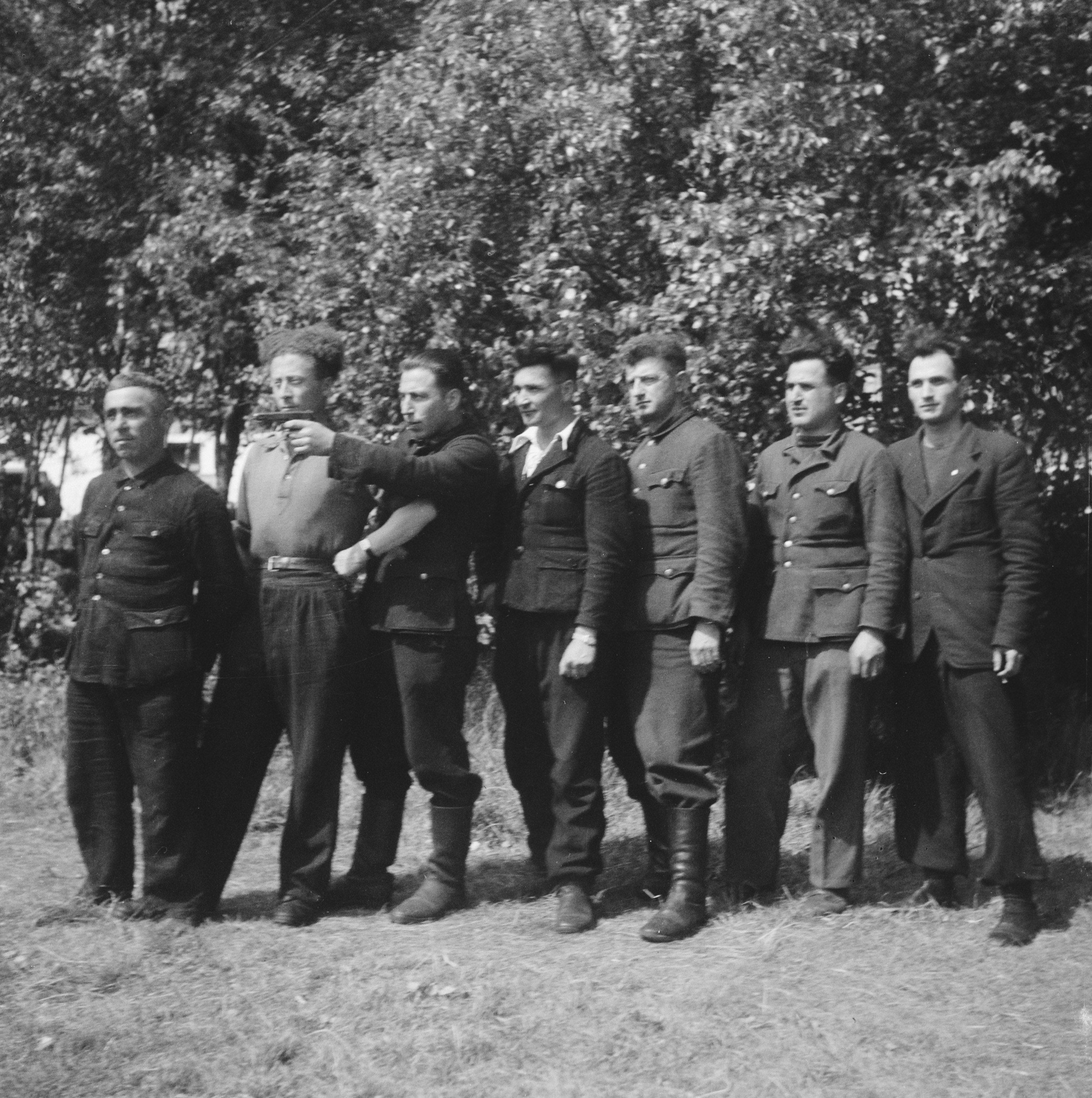
Georgian soldiers on Texel

Shortly after midnight on the night of 5–6 April 1945, the Georgians rose up and gained control of nearly the entire island. Approximately two hundred German soldiers were killed in the initial uprising, in their quarters or while standing guard, walking the roads of the island in groups or individually that night and the following day. Members of the Dutch resistance participated and assisted the Georgians. However, the rebellion hinged on an expected Allied landing which did not occur. Furthermore, the Georgians failed to secure the naval batteries on the southern and northern coasts of the island; the crews of these artillery installations were the only Germans still alive on the island.

A counterattack was ordered and the intact artillery batteries on the island began firing at sites where rebels were suspected to be. Approximately 2,000 riflemen of the 163rd Marine-Schützenregiment (Note: Composed of surplus naval personnel and organized as an infantry formation; all such ad hoc organizations of this genre towards the end of the war were poorly equipped, had little or no infantry training, and suffered from low morale.) were deployed from the Dutch mainland. Over the next five weeks they re-took the island; fighting was particularly heavy in the northern part of the island at Eierland and around the lighthouse. The German troops then combed the length of the island for any remaining Georgian soldiers, while the Dutch inhabitants sought to hide them. The German commander of the 882nd battalion, Major Klaus Breitner, stated long after the war that the uprising was "treachery, nothing else". Captured mutineers were ordered to dig their own graves, remove their German uniforms, and then executed. Breitner stated that the German troops were infuriated at how the Georgians had killed their comrades, and there were many volunteers for the fight, including naval personnel not trained in land combat. Regarding the fighting, Breitner recalled that:

"We suffered huge losses because the Georgians resisted fiercely from their entrenched positions around our former strongholds. They had considerable amounts of ammunition. The Georgians were well trained and knew the terrain well. Moreover, they knew they would be killed if caught. Initially we only had light weapons but we continued fighting and even reserve officers, who had experienced the First World War, participated. Everyone realised that we were about to lose the war, but we wanted to take revenge on the Georgians first."

During the rebellion, 565 Georgians, at least 812 Germans, and 120 residents of Texel were killed. The destruction was enormous; dozens of farms went up in flames, with damage later estimated at ten million guilders (US$3.77 million (Note: 1945/46 exchange rate per Bretton Woods system peg.)). The bloodshed lasted beyond the German capitulation in the Netherlands and Denmark on 5 May 1945 and even beyond Germany's general surrender on 8 May 1945. The fighting continued until Canadian Army troops arrived on 20 May 1945 to enforce the German surrender, and disarmed the remaining German troops.

== Aftermath ==
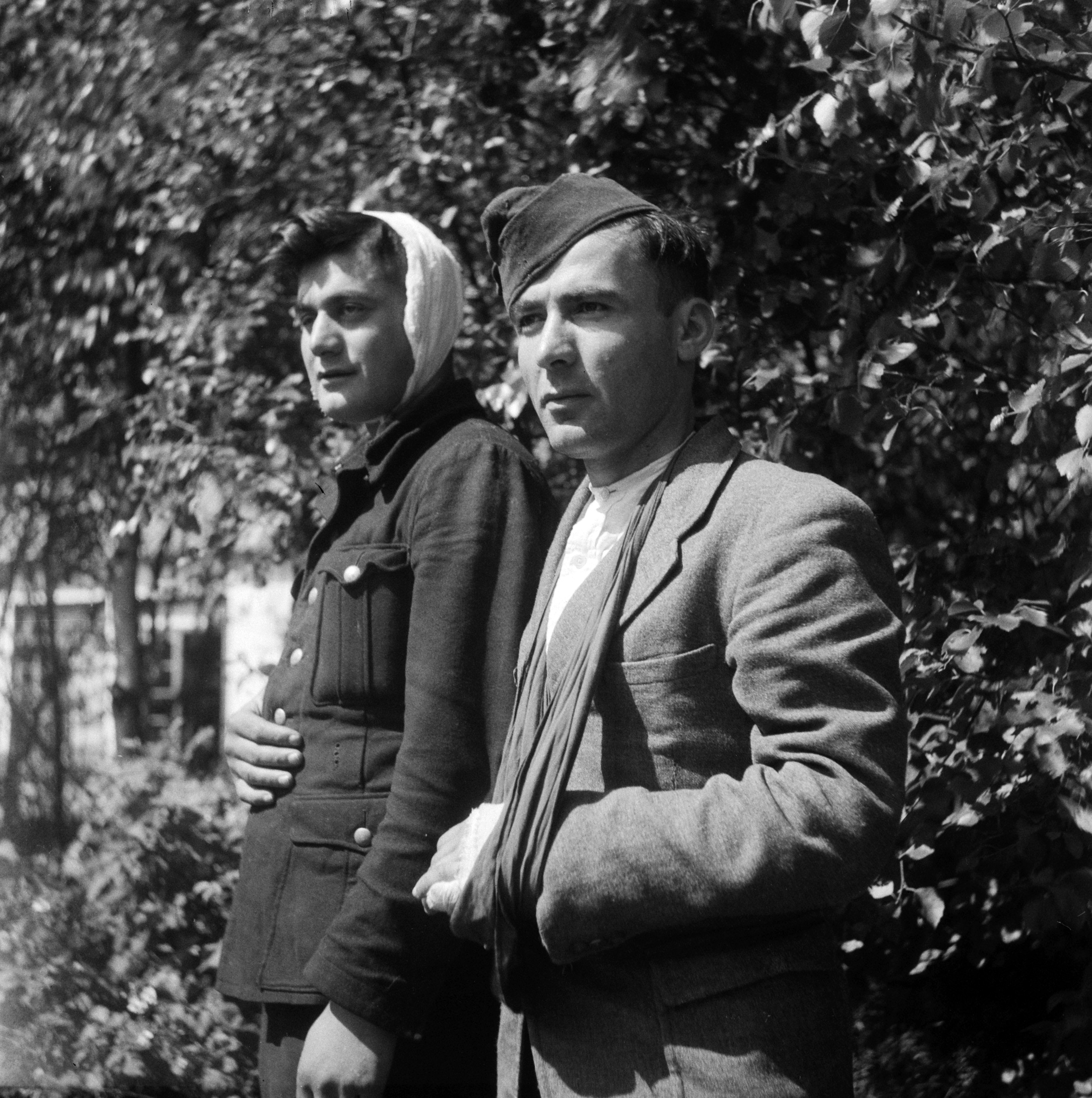
Two wounded Georgian soldiers at Texel in 1945

The Georgians lie buried in a ceremonial cemetery at the Hogeberg near Oudeschild. According to one account, 236 Georgian survivors were protected "from Stalinist reprisals," by the testimonies of their heroism submitted by the Allies. According to another one, the 228 Georgians who survived by hiding from the German troops in coastal minefields, or who were concealed by Texel farmers, were turned over to Soviet authorities. After arrival at a collection camp in the Soviet Union, 26 Georgians were singled out and banished together with their families and others were sent to Gulag. Those still alive in the mid-1950s were rehabilitated and allowed to return home. An article on the uprising also mentions that most escaped punishment due to declarations from the Dutch resistance and Canadian Army that they had fought valiantly against the Nazis, with only a handful exiled or sent to gulags as traitors and most of them granted an amnesty after Stalin's death. Until 1991, the ambassador of the Soviet Union to the Netherlands visited the graves of the Georgians on 4 May every year, and, at least during the latter visits, called the Georgians "Heroes of the Soviet Union". The Soviet Union donated a number of memorials to the war dead on Texel, including a pillar in the island's main cemetery as well as various sculptures in the Georgian cemetery.

Over time, the number of local participants in the memorial events declined as the Dutch Communist Party, which had played a key role in keeping the memory of the Georgian rebellion alive, dwindled in size and eventually disappeared.

In the late 1960s, the Soviet memorialization of the Texel rebels culminated in the release of a feature film known as Crucified Island. It depicted the rebels as being prisoners of war who somehow managed to steal weapons from the Germans.

On 4 May 2005, Mikheil Saakashvili visited the graves for the first time as the president of independent Georgia. His visit was officially described as a private one, and he was accompanied by his Dutch-born wife.

The German dead were initially buried in a part of the general cemetery in Den Burg. In 1949 they found their final resting place at Ysselsteyn German war cemetery, Limburg province, the Netherlands. The cemetery is administered by the German War Graves Commission. Den Burg General Cemetery also contains a plot of 167 World War II Commonwealth burials, most of them airmen; 44 of the burials are unidentified.

A permanent exhibition dedicated to these events can be found "in a corner" of the Aeronautical Museum at Texel International Airport.

One of the last Georgian survivors of the uprising died in July 2007 and was buried with military honours in Zugdidi, Georgia. There were two Georgian survivors still alive in 2010: Grisha Baindurashvili, who was then 88 years old and lived in Kaspi, a village 40 km west of Tbilisi, and Eugeny Artemidze, who had been one of the main organisers of the rebellion; he died at age 90 on June 22, 2010, on the same day he had gone to war 69 years earlier. Baindurashvili was still alive in 2015, when an interview with him was published. On August 6, 2021, Baindurashvili died at age 102 in his resident village Kaspi (as published in the "Reformatorisch Dagblad" of Texel, August 13, 2021).

== Number of casualties ==
Canadian troops led by Lieutenant Colonel Kirk landed unopposed on Texel on 17 May 1945, effectively liberating the island. Over a two-day period the Canadians disarmed 1,535 Germans. Soviet SMERSH forces arrived on Texel and took charge of 228 Georgians still alive. A Canadian report prepared for the commander of the SMERSH contingent recorded 470 Georgian and 2,347 German casualties on Texel.

In 1949, the German War Graves Commission disinterred 812 bodies (including the 400+ killed in their sleep by the Georgians in their shared quarters) on Texel for reburial at Ysselsteyn German war cemetery. (Note: The German War Graves Commission called the event Umbettung, roughly "exhumation and reburial".) The numbers given by the Texel district list "565 Georgians, 120 Texel islanders and approximately 800 Germans killed"; followed by "other sources… speak of more than 2,000 Germans killed." The "other sources" comment in all probability refers to the Canadian report to SMERSH that lumped together under "casualties" the 1,535 disarmed Germans with their 812 dead.

== See also ==
- Villefranche-de-Rouergue Mutiny (September 1943)

== Sources ==
- Dick van Reeuwijk. Opstand der Georgiërs, Sondermeldung Texel. Den Burg: Het Open Boek. Herzien Editie 2001, 71 pages. (The Georgian Rebellion on Texel). ISBN 9070202093
- Hans Houterman, J. N. Houterman, Eastern Troops in Zeeland, the Netherlands, 1943-1945, p. 62. Axis Europa Books, 1997. ISBN 1891227009
- Eric Lee, Night of the Bayonets: The Texel Uprising and Hitler's Revenge, April–May 1945. Greenhill Books, 2020. ISBN 978-1784384685
- Henri Antony Van der Zee (1998), The Hunger Winter: Occupied Holland, 1944-45, pp. 213–220. University of Nebraska Press, ISBN 0803296185 (Reprint. Originally published: London : J. Norman & Hobhouse, 1982.)
- "Der Geburtstag des Todes" [The Birthday of Death]. Der Spiegel. Vol. 20. 1995. pp. 188–190.
