= Shalva Maglakelidze =

Georgian jurist, politician, military commander, and Axis collaborator

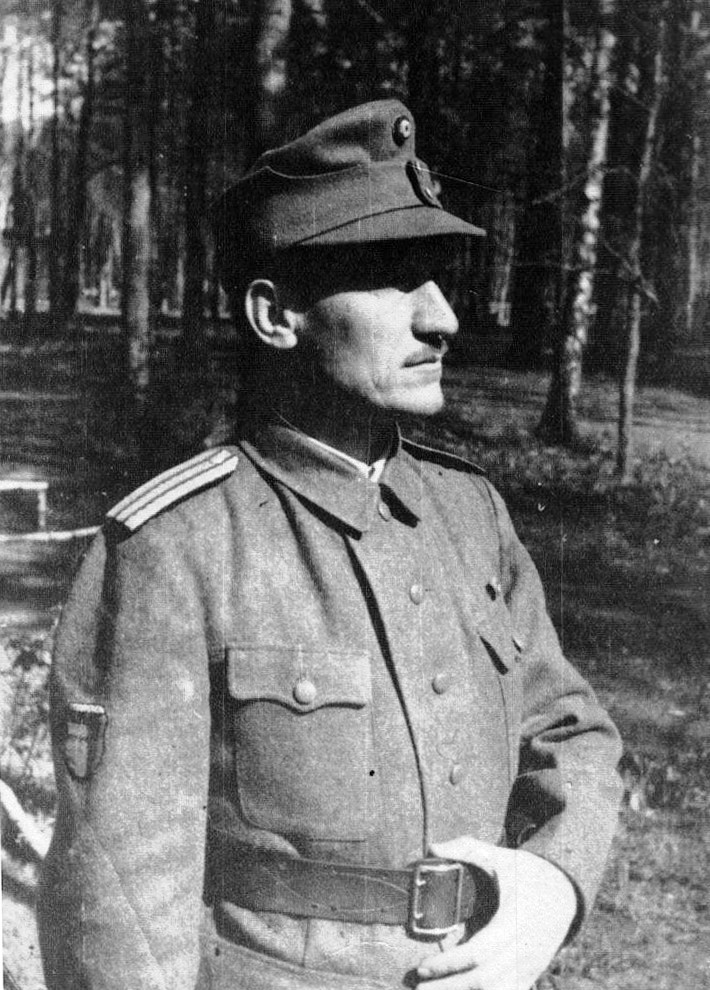
- Born: 1893; Dikhashkho, Vani Municipality, Kutaisi Governorate, Russian Empire
- Died: 1976 (aged 82–83); Tbilisi, Georgian SSR, USSR
- Education: Gymnasium in Kutaisi Berlin University
- Occupations: Jurist, politician and military commander
- Known for: The leaders of anti-Soviet movement of Georgian émigrés in Europe and commander in the Wehrmacht's Georgische Legion

Shalva Maglakelidze (also spelled as "Maghlakelidze"; Georgian: შალვა მაღლაკელიძე; 1893–1976) was a Georgian jurist, politician and military commander. A high-ranking official in briefly independent Georgia (1918–1921), he was one of the leaders of anti-Soviet movement of Georgian émigrés in Europe. During World War II Maglakelidze was a commander in the Wehrmacht's Georgische Legion. Abducted from West Germany by the Soviet security agents, he was allowed to reside, under police supervision, in his native Georgia where he practiced law and died in Tbilisi.

== Early career ==
Maglakelidze received his early education in a Georgian gymnasium in Kutaisi, then part of the Russian Empire, and obtained a PhD in law from the Berlin University. He fought in the Russian ranks in World War I and supported the Georgian independence cause following the Russian Revolution of 1917. From 1917 to 1918, he served as a plenipotentiary for the Russian Provisional Government and then for the government of Georgia in the restive districts of Akhaltsikhe and Akhalkalaki, where he resisted local Muslim separatism. From 1919 to 1920, Maglakelidze was a governor general of the Georgian capital Tbilisi.

A Germanophile and monarchist, Maglakelidze was close to the German military representative in the Caucasus von Schulenburg. They both were suspicious of the Georgian Social-Democratic government and contemplated its replacement with the constitutional monarchy under the German prince Joachim.

== Emigration ==
=== Latvia ===
The Soviet invasion of Georgia in 1921 forced Maglakelidze into exile to Europe where he emerged as one of the key figures in Georgian émigré movement against the Soviet regime. He settled in Riga, Latvia, where he coordinated Caucasian émigré groups in close contact with the exiled Georgian government. In January 1929 Maglakelidze, together with his fellow Georgian Giorgi Shvangiradze founded the Iveria society (Iveria is a poetic name for Georgia), which was soon joined by the Armenian émigrés, and in June it was renamed into the Caucasian Society. One of the main activities of the society was providing aid for destitute countrymen. In 1933, due to internal strife, the Georgian faction left the Society and established the Georgian Society of Latvia.

=== France and Germany ===
Maglakelidze moved to France in 1934 and finally established himself in Germany in 1938. He reestablished old contacts with Schulenburg. They both lobbied the Georgian émigré prince Irakli Bagration of Mukhrani, with close ties with the Italian political élite, for presidency of the Georgian National Committee in Berlin and saw him as a candidate for the Georgian throne which was to be restored under a German protectorate. Maglakelidze also supported the idea of Caucasian confederation provided that the North Caucasians and Azerbaijanis abandoned their pro-Turkish stance and Armenia adopted a "truly pro-Caucasian" policy.

In 1942, Maglakelidze helped found two nationalist organizations Tetri Giorgi and the Union of Georgian Traditionalists, both based in Germany, which played a role in recruiting Georgian émigrés and Soviet Georgian prisoners of war into the Wehrmacht's Georgian Legion (Georgische Legion) during World War II. The same year, Maglakelidze assumed the role of commander of the Legion with the rank of colonel (Oberst).

By late 1943, Maglakelidze's relations with the German leadership had soured due largely to his protest against the deployment of Georgian battalions against the resistance movements across Europe. He insisted that the Georgians be sent to fight only against the Soviets for the independence of their country. In October 1943, Maglakelidzé was forced to resign as a commander of the Georgian Legion; he was transferred, under a false pretext, to the German units in the Baltics. In 1944, he was promoted to the rank of Generalmajor (major general). That same year, he became the only Georgian to join the Committee for the Liberation of the Peoples of Russia led by the ex-Soviet general Andrey Vlasov. The move was unanimously condemned by the Georgian émigrés and added to Maglakelidze's already strained relations with some of the Georgian politicians in exile, especially with Grigol Alchibaia, leader of the Caucasian community in Poland. These uneasy relations were probably behind the false rumors about Maglakelidze's ties with the Soviet security services, further fueled by the general's subsequent fate.

After the war, Maglakelidze lived in Italy and returned to West Germany in 1950. There, he was made a military aide to Konrad Adenauer. He did not give up his efforts for Georgian émigré mobilization for which purpose he founded, in January 1954, the Munich-based Union of Georgian Soldiers Abroad.

== Return ==
In August 1954, Maglakelidze was kidnapped by the Soviet security agents from the German territory but he was not brought to trial. After brief imprisonment, he was allowed to return to Georgia. The Maglakelidze case was widely exploited by the Soviet propaganda as an example of the state's lenient treatment of a "re-defector" and in an effort to discredit the Caucasian political emigration. The official Soviet press carried the detailed "confession" of Maglakelidze in which he denounced the Caucasian émigré leaders as the United States and British intelligence agents and expressed his "sincere repentance for the crimes he had committed against the motherland".

Henceforth, Maglakelidze did not enjoy publicity. He was permitted to live and work as a lawyer in Tbilisi, under the watchful eyes of the Soviet secret police until his death in 1976.
