= Wannsee Institut =

Nazi political and economic research institute

Wannsee Institut was an SS research institute in Nazi Germany focused on studies of the politics and economics of the Soviet Union.

The Wannsee Institut was founded as a private foundation in Wannsee, southwest of Berlin, and was incorporated by Reinhard Heydrich into the Sicherheitsdienst (Security Service) in 1936. It operated camouflaged as the Institute for Research of Antiquity, lodged in the expropriated mansion of the wealthy German-Jewish family of Oppenheim. Research staff were recruited from the University of Berlin, preferably with Baltic background. The institute was first headed by the Georgian émigré scholar Michael Achmeteli, who was succeeded by the Austrian professor Hans Koch. In 1942, during the increased Allied bombing raids, the Wannsee Institut was evacuated to Schloss Plankenwart near Graz, Austria. During this period, the Wannsee Institut was closely associated with the group preparing Operation Zeppelin, aimed at recruiting Soviet POWs for espionage and sabotage behind the Russian lines. After the war, the surviving material of the Wannsee Institut's valuable holdings was transferred to the Gehlen Organization, an intelligence agency in the United States-occupied zone of Germany.
