= Georgian Legion (1941–1945) =

Georgische Legion Georgian Legion
- Insignia of the Georgian Legion, featuring the flag of the First Georgian Republic
- Active: 1941 – 1945
- Allegiance: Nazi Germany (until April 1945)
- Branch: Wehrmacht
- Size: 30,000
- Engagements: World War II; Eastern Front of World War II; Battle of the Caucasus; Operation Edelweiss; Battle of Tuapse (1942); Battle of Nalchik (1942); Lvov-Sandomierz Offensive; Western Front of World War II; Operation Overlord; Normandy landings; Utah Beach; Georgian uprising on Texel; Italian campaign (World War II)

The Georgian Legion (German: Georgische Legion, Georgian: ქართული ლეგიონი, romanized: kartuli legioni) was a military formation of Nazi Germany during World War II, composed of ethnic Georgians. It was formed by Georgian émigrés and prisoners of war; its declared aim was the eventual restoration of Georgia's independence from the Soviet Union under Nazi Party doctrine and supervision. Some components of the Georgian Legion fell under the operational control of Waffen-SS.

Compared to other Soviet nationalities, Georgians initially received a preferential treatment from the Germans. This was partly due to the classification of Georgians as Aryans in Nazi racial ideology and also because several Georgian scholars, such as Alexander Nikuradse and Michael Achmeteli, were advisers to leading Nazis like Alfred Rosenberg.

The Nazi perception of Georgians, however, began to change for worse in light of a series of defections and Adolf Hitler's growing paranoia. When speaking of military units consisting of purely Caucasians, Hitler said: "The Georgians are not a Turkish people, rather a typical Caucasian tribe... Despite all explanations—either from Rosenberg or from the military side—I don’t trust the Armenians, either. I consider the Armenian units to be just as unreliable and dangerous. The only ones I consider to be reliable are the pure Muslims, which means the real Turkish nations." Hitler also surmised that Joseph Stalin's Georgian ethnicity, as well as the fact that the Georgian SSR was nominally autonomous, would eventually draw the Georgians closer to the USSR than to Germany.

Faced with a choice between Hitler and Stalin's regimes, members of the Georgian Legion often suffered tragic fates. Notably, during the Georgian uprising on Texel, hundreds of Georgians were killed by the Nazis. Those who survived were, on Moscow's orders, forcibly repatriated to the Soviet Union, where a small contingent of the group was convicted of collaboration and banished to Siberia with their families.

== History ==
During the Second World War, the Wehrmacht's ethnic Georgian Legion was formed from émigrés living in Western Europe after the 1921 Soviet invasion of Georgia, combined with Soviet prisoners of war of Georgian origin who chose to fight for Germany rather than submit to often brutally poor living conditions in POW camps.

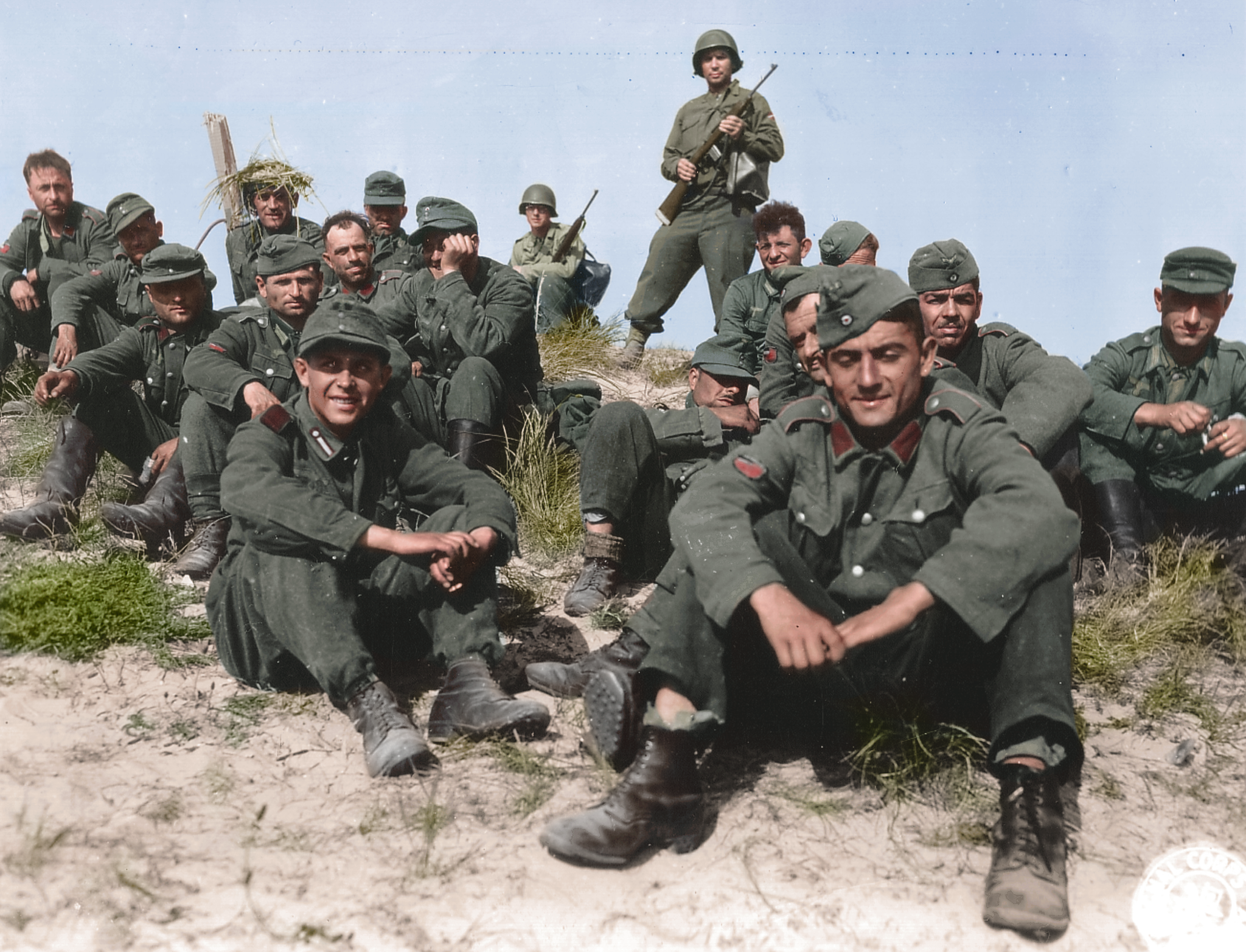
U.S. Army soldiers of the 1st Engineer Special Brigade guard captured Georgian soldiers from the OstBattallion 795 "Georgian" during the Allied Normandy landings, Utah Beach, near Pouppeville, Lower Normandy, France, July 1944

Nazi Germany invaded the Soviet Union in June 1941, though they never reached Soviet Georgia. The main Georgian Legion was formed in December 1941. The Georgians trained in western Ukraine and became operational in the autumn of 1942. At least 30,000 Georgians served in the German armed forces during World War II. The Georgians served in thirteen field battalions of up to 800 men, each made up of five companies. Georgians were also found in the Wehrmacht's North Caucasian Legion and in other Caucasian ethnic legions. The Georgian military formations were commanded by Shalva Maglakelidze, Michel-Fridon Zulukidze, Col. Solomon Nicholas Zaldastani, and other officers formerly of the Democratic Republic of Georgia (1918–21).

In addition to this main legion, at the behest of German occupiers in Paris ensconced in the Hotel Lutetia from the spring of 1940, Michel Kedia and Akaki Chavgoulidze, owners of a yoghurt business, began forming units of Georgian emigres living in the French capital. The men were told they were to assist Germany by conducting surveillance in German factories and performing other non-military tasks like driving trucks of supplies. In return, the Germans promised to restore the independence of Georgia, suppressed by Stalin, Beriia, and other Bolsheviks in 1921 and again in 1924. The men were given a short course in anti-sabotage work at Chateau de Villemorant near Orleans. Following that, however, the recruits actually were organized into three military units and entrained toward eastern Europe. The units were named for Tamara, a twelfth-century Georgian queen. Tamara I consisted of 19 men. They parachuted into Russia. Most disappeared although four returned to Paris and were arrested in 1944. The first section of Tamara II consisted of 90 men. They left Paris 1 July 1941. About nine survived. The second section of Tamara II, consisting of 54 men, left Paris 15 July 1941. Approximately 15 resurfaced. The recruits of the Tamara II units milled about in Romania, southern Ukraine, and the Crimean Peninsula. Some, who became ill, received medical treatment in Vienna or other venues and were allowed to return to Paris. Some fled. Most were demobilized in the fall of 1942 although they were asked to help suppress Communist uprisings expected at the end of the war. The men were initially given 3,000 francs and their families were given stipends.

Upon their return to Paris, some of the men in the Tamara units worked for Chalva Odicharia. He directed "Bureaus of Purchase." These assisted the German occupation by rooting out and suppressing sabotage, confiscating Jewish properties, and acquiring scarce materials for the Germans. Odicharia's assistants included 33 Georgians, as well as 7 Russians, 3 Italians, 2 Corsicans, 2 Germans, 1 Alsatian, 1 Tunisian, 1 Portuguese, 1 Martinique resident, 2 Czechs, and 30 French citizens. Two of the assistants were Jews, four were women.

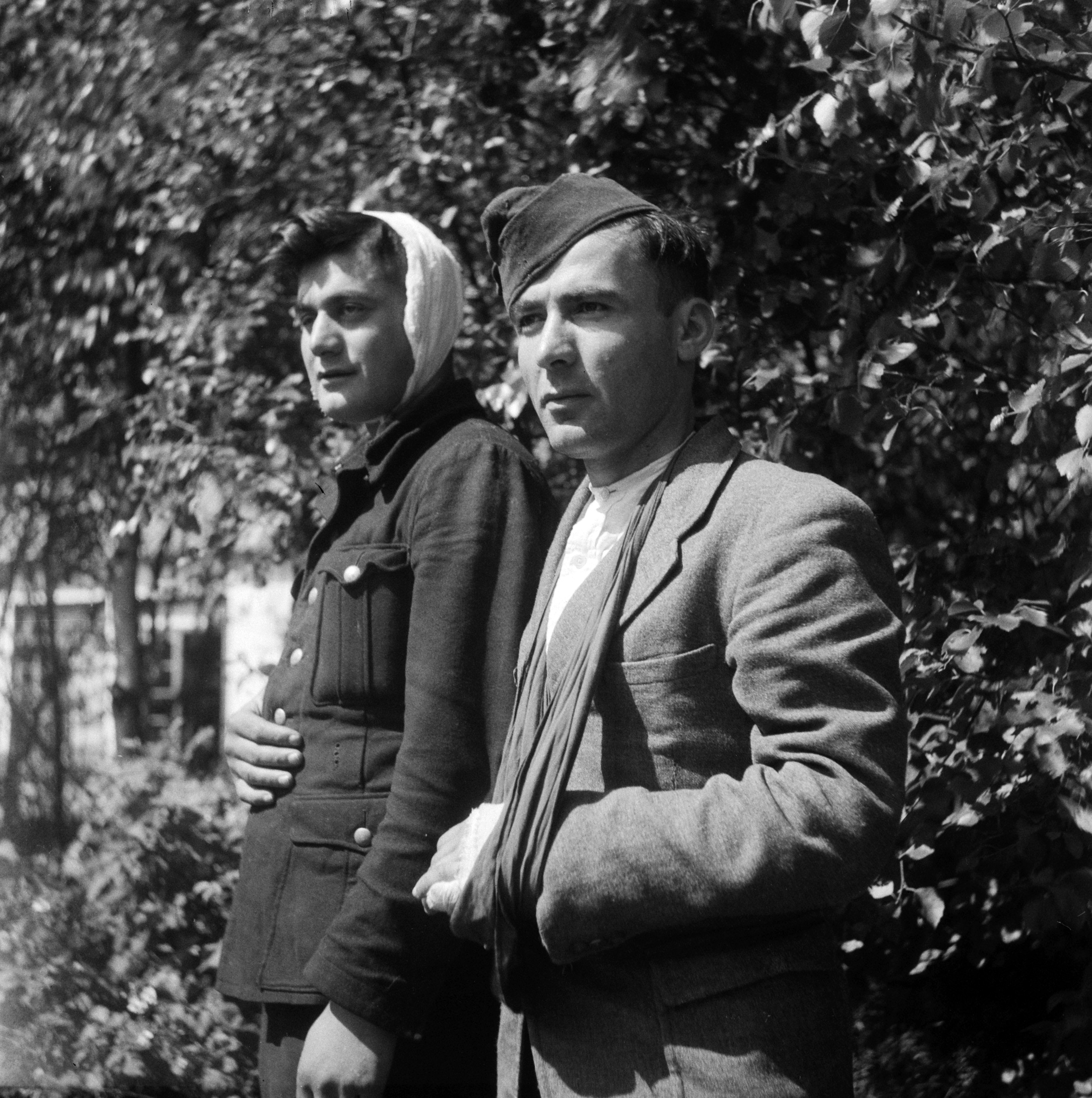
Wounded Georgian Legion soldiers at Texel, Netherlands, 1945

This venture was largely hampered by the intervention of Alfred Rosenberg. Adolf Hitler himself was greatly suspicious of the Georgian and other Soviet battalions. This was especially so after some Georgian soldiers of the Wehrmacht deserted and joined local Resistance movements across Europe, especially in Italy and France. Despite these suspicions, Alexander Nikuradze, Michael Achmeteli, and some other Georgian scholars were held in high esteem in Germany and managed to keep a somewhat favorable treatment of Georgians by the Reich.

As a result of Hitler's distrust of Osttruppen ("Eastern Troops"), some Georgian battalions were moved west to occupation duties in the Netherlands. With the western allies driving into Germany, the 822 Georgian battalion, stationed on the Dutch island of Texel, rebelled against their German overlords. The resulting battle, known as the Georgian uprising on Texel, continued from April 5, 1945, past the general German surrender, until May 20. This event is sometimes described as Europe's last battle.

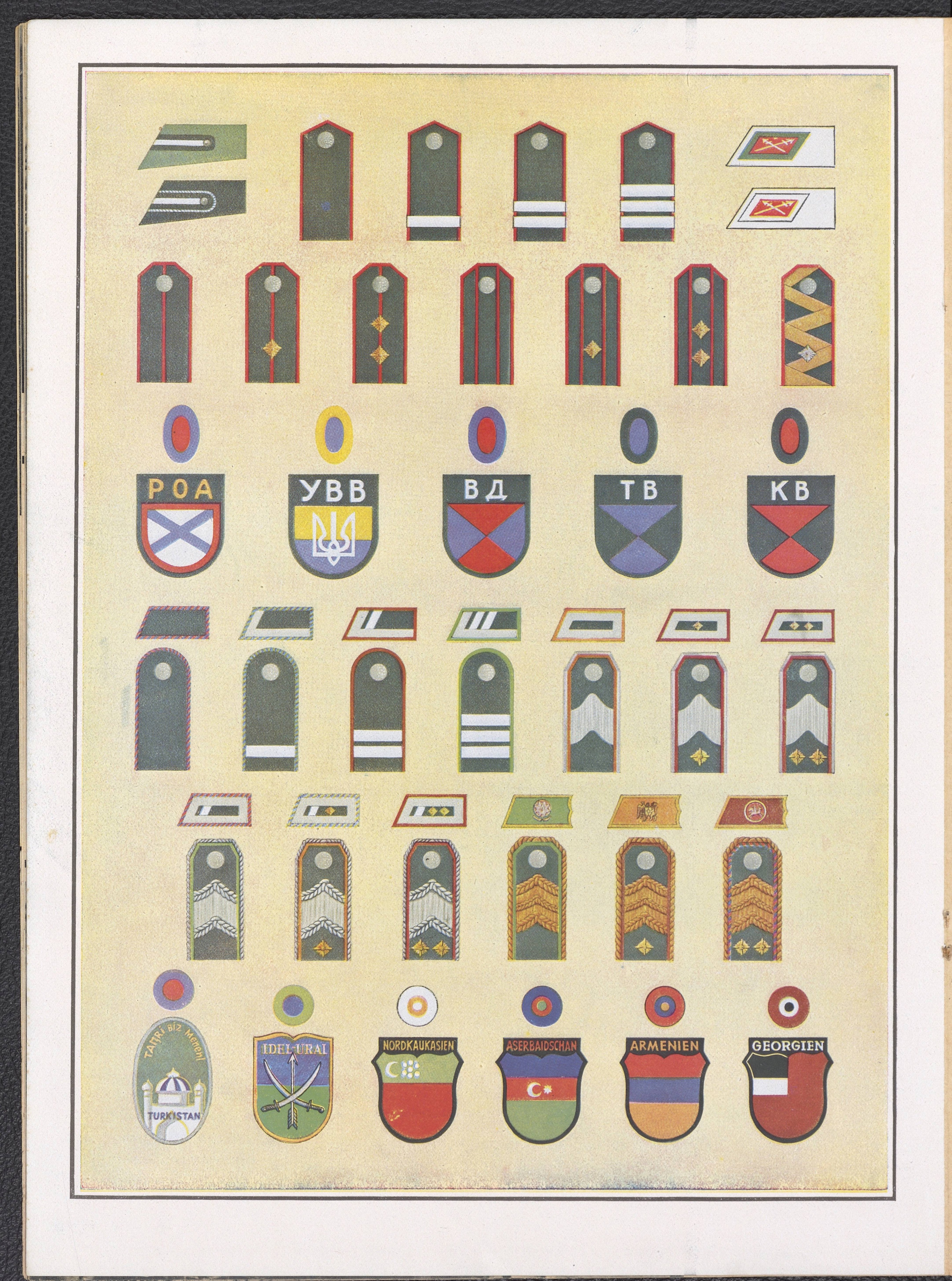
Second set of insignia depicts Turkestan, Caucasian, and Volga Tatar Units patches and rank badges.

In accordance with inter-Allied agreements, all Soviet citizens were to be repatriated (by force if necessary) to the Soviet Union. The Soviets treated those who wore German uniforms, such as those in the Georgian Legion, as traitors. They were punished upon their return, with many exiled to Siberia or Central Asia.

== List of Georgian units in the Wehrmacht ==
List of Georgian units in the Wehrmacht (incomplete)

- 795 Battalion "Shalva Maglakelidze"

Fighting: 1942 in North Ossetia, 1944 in France

- 796 Battalion.

Fighting: 1942/43 in Tuapse, North Caucasus

- 797 Battalion "Giorgi Saakadze"

Fighting: 1943/44 in France

- 798 Battalion

Fighting: 1943/44 in France, 1945 in Germany

- 799 Battalion

Fighting: 1943/44 in France, 1945 in Germany

- 822 Battalion "Tamara"

Fighting: 1943/44/45 in France and on Texel island (Netherlands)

- 823 Battalion
- 824 Battalion

Fighting: 1944 in Lvov, Poland

- SS Waffengruppe "Georgien" was formed on December 11, 1944 and commanded by SS Waffen-Standartenführer Michail Pridon Tsulukidze

The elite Bergmann Battalion, part of the Brandenburgers of the German Abwehr, also had a majority of Georgian personnel.

== See also ==
- Ostlegionen
- Tetri Giorgi
- Bergmann Battalion
- Union of Georgian Traditionalists
- Georgian Uprising of Texel
- Georgian Legion (1914-1918)
