= Aleksi-Meskhishvili =

Aleksi-Meskhishvili (Georgian: ალექსი-მესხიშვილი) is a famous Georgian surname of the calligraphers and painters. It may refer to:

- Barbara Aleksi-Meskhishvili, Soviet-era stage actress
- Georgi Aleksi-Meskhishvili, set designer and artist
- Lado Aleksi-Meskhishvili, stage actor and director
- Nino Aleksi-Meskhishvili, Soviet-era stage actor
- Sardion Aleksi-Meskhishvili, doctor and translator
- Shalva Aleksi-Meskhishvili, jurist and politician
- Vladimir Aleksi-Meskhishvili, award-winning architect
