= Zabihollah Safa =

Iranian academic (1911–1999)

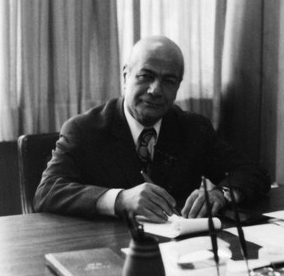
Zabihollah Safa, c. 1975

Zabihollah Safa (Persian: ذبیح‌اللّه صفا; 7 May 1911 in Shahmirzad, Qajar Iran – 29 April 1999 in Lübeck, Germany) was a scholar and professor emeritus of Iranian studies at the University of Tehran.

His main contribution to the field of Iranian studies is seen in his seminal and comprehensive works on the history of Persian literature. He was also a regular contributor to the Encyclopædia Iranica.

== Education and professional life ==
After primary and secondary education in Babol and Tehran, he attended the Dār al-Mo’allemin-e `Āli (later Dāneshsarā-ye `Āli) and the University of Tehran where he received a doctorate in Persian literature in 1943. His thesis, a comprehensive study of epic narratives in Iran (Hamāseh-sarāyi dar Irān) was later published as a book and illustrated his ability to synthesize a vast range of readings into a coherent manual for teaching.

The topic chosen for his thesis was also an indication of his life long love for his country and his determination to bear witness through his writing to major literary, philosophic and scientific contributions made by Iranians to civilization at large. His precocious talents and productivity also manifested itself in his journalistic activities as a young man. As early as 1933 he began contributing to the influential journal Mehr, and was its chief editor from 1937 to 1941.

He was also a capable administrator, again using his talents for organized and systematic work to the full. He taught at the University of Tehran from 1941, was appointed to the chair of Persian literary history in 1948, and was dean of the Faculty in 1963-1967. Upon retirement, he became an emeritus professor in 1969. He also held high positions in other administrative spheres including the UNESCO commission in Iran and on the board of the Red Lion and Sun Organization (the Iranian counterpart to the Red Cross).

It is however, for his work as an editor of many classical texts and above all, for his monumental History of Persian Literature and his valuable anthology (translated into French in the UNESCO Collection as Anthologie de la poésie persane by Gilbert Lazard, Roger Lescot and Henri Massé, Paris, 1964) that he will be best remembered.

— Newsletter of the Center for Iranian Studies, MELAC, Vol 11, No 1, Columbia University, New York, Spring 1999

== Awards ==
Z. Safa has won several awards: a.o. Decoration (medal) for Science (1. class) (Cultural Ministry (1936), Nešān-e Sepās, 1. class (1947), Palmes Académiques Rang Commandeur (French Government) (1970), Neshān-e Tāj (1977), Ehsan Yarshater prize (1997)

== Bibliography ==
=== Persian literature ===
- Hamâse-sarâyi dar Irân, Tehran 1945 (2000)
- Târikh-e tahawwol-e Nazm-o- Nasr-e Pârsi, 1952 (1331), 8. ed. 1974 (1353),
- Ayên-e sokhan. Dar ma’âni wa bayân, Tehran 1952 (1959), 18. ed. 1994
- Târikh-e adabiyyât dar Irân, Tehran 1953, 16. ed. 2001 8 vol.
- Gandj-e Sokhan, 1370 pages, 1968 (1348), ed. 1976 (1355), Tehran, 1995 3 vol.
- Gandjine-je Sokhan, 1969 (1348), 3. ed. 1974 (1353), ?. ed. 1983, Tehran, 6 vol.
- Gandj va Gandjine, Tehran 2002

=== Persian history and history of thought and science ===
- Gâh-shomari wa Djashn-hâ-je Melli –je Irâniân, 1933 -1976 (1312–1355))
- Dânesh-ha-ye Iunâni dar Shâhanshâhi-ye Sâssâni, 1952 (1331) Tehran
- Mazdâ-Parast-i dar Irân-e Ghadim, 1957 (1336), 3. ed. 1978 (1357) (2537)
- Târikh’e olum’e aghli dar tammaddon’e eslami ta awwasate gharne panjom, Tehran, 1952 (1977)
- Târikh-e Oulum wa Adabiyyât-e Irâni
- Moghâddem-e-ï bar Tassâwof, 1975 (1354), 4 ed. 1976 (1355), Tehran
- Nazar-i beh Târikh-e Hekmat wa Oulum dar Irân, 1976 (1355), Tehran
- Âmuseshgâh-ha wa Âmusesh-hâ dar Irân, 1975 (1354), Tehran
- Dur-namâ-ï as Farhang-e Irâni wa Assar-e Djahâni-ye Ân, 1971 (1350), Tehran
- Khollasseh-ye Târikhe Siyâssi wa Edjtemâï dar Irân, 2. ed. 1978 (1357), Tehran
- Siri dar Târikh-e Sabân –hâ wa Addab-e Irâni, 1976 (1355) Tehran
- Niki-nâmeh, 1971 (1350), Tehran
- Âyin-e Shâh-han-shâhi-ye Irân, 1967 (1346), Tehran
- Târikh-e Shâhanshâhi-ye Irân wa Maghâm-e Manawi-e Ân, 1975 (1354), Tehran
- Shâhanshah dar Târikh wa Addab-e Irâni

=== Editorials and works on specific historic personalities ===
- Ayyuqi (Poet of the 5th century/isl.): Warqa o Golshâh, Edition with Introduction, Glossary and Appendix. 1964 Tehran, (This novel written in verses was translated into the French language by Souren Melikian (In: Arts Asiatiques Tome XXII. Numéro Spécial. in 1970) after being published in Iran. (Remark by Z. Safa in his handwritten CV)
- Djashn-nâmeh-je Ebn-e Sinâ(3 volumes), vol 1: 1952 (1331), vol 2: 1955 (1334), vol. 3: 1956 (1335), Teheran
- Yâd-Nâmeh-ye Kh. Tussi(Congress Teheran 1957 (1336))
- Diwân-e Abdul-Wâse’ Djebli, 1960 (1339), 2. ed. 1977 (1356), Tehran
- Dârâb-nâmeh-je Bigami (or Firuznâmeh) 2 volumes, vol 1: 1960, (1339), vol 2: 1962 (1341) (both issues reprinted in 2003) Unesco - Translation into Englisch
- Diwân-e Saïfu’d-din e Mohammade Farghâni, 1962 (1341), 3. ed. 1965 (1344), 3 volumes
- Dârâb-nâmeh-je Tarsussi, 2 volumes, vol. 1: 1965 (1344), 2. ed. 1977 (1356), vol 2: 1967, 2. ed. 1977 (1356), Tehran
- Bakhtiârnâmeh, 1966 (1345)
- Ahwâl wa Assâr-e Abu Reihân-e Biruni, 1973 (1352), Tehran
- Dalirân-e Djânbâs, 1976 (1355), Tehran, 467 pages
- Bahrâm-e Tshubin
- Rostam wa Esfandijâr(Rostam and Esfandiar – Heroes of the Shâhnâmeh
- Tshâhar Maghâleh
- Hakim-e Fârâb, 1974 (1353), Tehran

=== Works published in French ===
- Le livre du Millénaire d’Avicenne, 1953 (1332)
- Anthologie de la poésie persane, Paris, Gallimard Unesco, 1964, ?. ed. 2003
- Un aperçu sur l’évolution de la pensée à travers la poésie persane, 1969 (1348), Tehran
- Al-Biruni, ses oeuvres et ses pensées, 1973 (1352), Teheran
- Djalal al-Din Mawlavi, grand penseur et poète persan 1974 (1353), Tehran
- La prose rythmique persane (Asiathèque, 1976)
- Comparaison des origines et des sources des deux contes persans:“Leyli et Madjnoun“ de Nizami et „Varqah et Golchah“ de Ayouqi, Accademia Nazionale die Lincei, Roma, 1977

=== Translations into the Persian language ===
- Marg-e Soghrât, (La mort de Socrate, Lamartine) 1935 (1314), 3.ed. 1968 (1347), Tehran
- Râfâël, (Raphael, Lamartine) 1938 (1317), 5. ed. 1978 (1357), Tehran
- Leibnitz, Mehr, 2. ed. 1949 (1328)
- Kayâniân, 1957 (1336), 4. ed. 1976 (1355), Translation of the Danish scholar Arthur Christensens: ‚Les Kayanides’

=== Own poetry ===
- Nas’at-e Djâm, 1976 (1355) (2535), Teheran

=== Literature (selection) ===
- Iranshenasi. Papers in Honour of Professor Zabihollah Safa. Vol.III, No. 1, Rockville, Maryland, USA Spring 1991
- Iranshenasi. Commemorative Issue for Zabihollah Safa (1911–1999). Vol.XI, No. 3, Rockville, Maryland, USA Autumn 1999
- Djalal Khaleghi Motlagh: "Zabihollah Safa und sein Werk". (Zabihollah Safa and his works). In: Iranzamin, Bonn 1991, 1
- Seyfeddin Najmabadi: "Ein Nachruf auf Professor Zabihollah Safa". (Obituary for Professor Zabihollah Safa) In: Orient 4/2000, Hamburg, S. 528ff.
- Mohammad Torabi. Djaschn-nâmeh-ye Ostâd Zabihollâh Safâ (Honorary issue for Professor Zabihollah Safa). Nasr'e Shâhâb, Teheran 19

== Quotes on Zabihollah Safa ==
- "The most outstanding historian of Persian literature" (BBC, Persian 11 November 1999)
- "One of the most eminent and productive Persian scholars of our time and a Consulting Editor and regular contributor to the Encyclopaedia Iranica" (Newsletter of the Center for Iranian Studies, Melac, Vol 11, No 1, Columbia University, New York, Spring 1999)
- "An Eternal Name in the History of Persian Literature." (Ehsan Yarshater lecutreship prize signature, 1997)

== See also ==
- Iranian studies
- Persian literature
