= Vladimer Aleksi-Meskhishvili =

Georgian architect

Vladimer "Lado" Aleksi-Meskhishvili (Georgian: ვლადიმერ [ლადო] ალექსი-მესხიშვილი; September 15, 1915 — June 21, 1978) was a Georgian architect of the Soviet period, whose buildings are scattered across Georgia.

== Family ==
Vladimir Aleksi-Meskhishvili was a son of the jurist and politician Shalva Aleksi-Meskhishvili and a grandson of the pioneering theater actor Lado Aleksi-Meskhishvili. He was married twice, secondly to the filmmaker Lana Gogoberidze (1958). He had four children, including the now-United States-based set designer Gogi Aleksi-Meskhishvili.

== Career ==
External image
- Tbilisi Sports Palace, 1961

Vladimir Aleksi-Meskhishvili was born in Tbilisi, graduated from the Industrial Institute of Georgia in 1939 and taught at Tbilisi Polytechnic University since 1955. His major works include the sanatorium "Imereti" in Tsq'altubo (coauthored with L. Janelidze, 1948–57), dacha houses in Ts'q'neti (1956–62), Tbilisi Sports Palace (coauthored with architect I. Kasradze and engineer D. Kajaia, 1961), restaurant "Iori" by the Tbilisi Sea (1962), government recreational complex in Bichvinta (1962), Tbilisi Agrarian Institute (with G. Gabashvili, 1967), metro station Leninis Moedani in Tbilisi (1967), Tbilisi Chess Palace (with G. Gudushauri, 1974).

He was awarded the Shota Rustaveli Prize in 1969.
