= Gabrieli (calligrapher) =

Georgian calligrapher

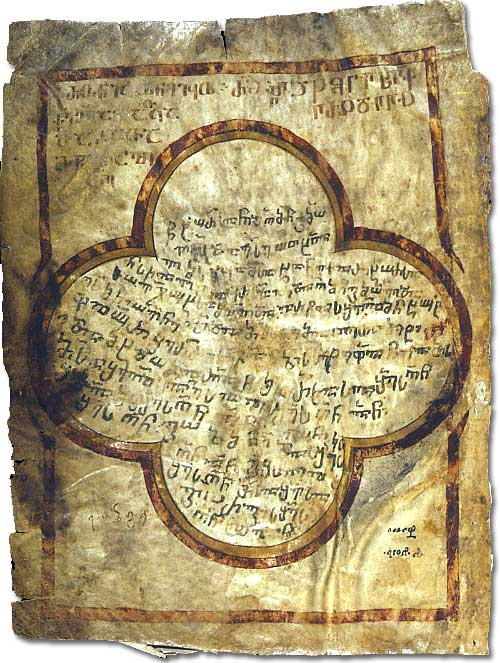
Jruchi I Gospel by Gabrieli.

Gabrieli (Georgian: გაბრიელი) was a Georgian calligrapher of the 10th century.

He worked in Shatberdi monastery and in 936 rewrote the Jruchi I Gospels. He used brown and yellow ink and his calligraphic letters were thick and cube-like, high and long.
