= Alexander Sulkhanishvili =

Georgian translator and calligrapher

Alexander Sulkhanishvili (Georgian: ალექსანდრე სულხანიშვილი; 1808 in Tbilisi – ?) was a Georgian translator and calligrapher of the 19th century.

In 1825, he rewrote the works of Sulkhan-Saba Orbeliani. He also spoke Russian, Persian and Turkish languages. In 1828, he translated from Persian to Georgian the work of the 15th-century poet Panah, Bakhtiarnameh. From the 1840s, Sulkhanishvili lived in Saint Petersburg. In 1839, he published a Georgian-French-Russian dictionary.
