= Meskhiev =

Meskhiev (Russian: Месхиев) is a Russian masculine surname, its feminine counterpart is Meskhieva. It may refer to

- Dmitry Meskhiev (born 1963), Russian film director
- Shalva Aleksi-Meskhishvili (Shalva Meskhiev; 1884–1960), Georgian jurist and politician
