= Shatberdi Codex =

Manuscript

შატბერდის კრებული
- Shatberdi Codex
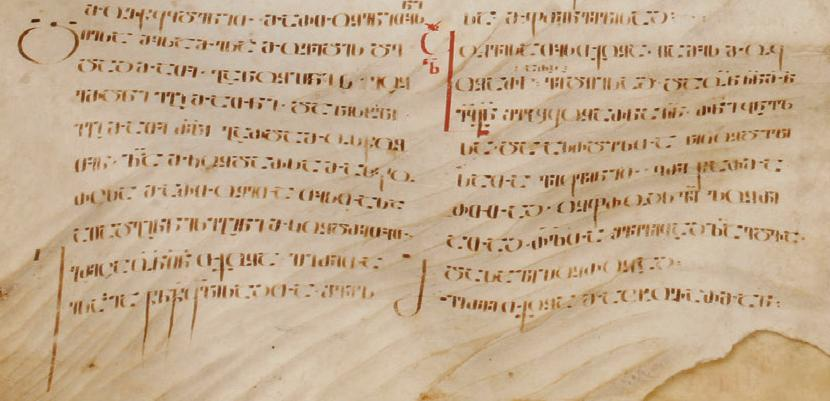
- Language: Old Georgian
- Provenance: Shatberdi Monastery
- Genre: Multiple-text

The Shatberdi Codex (Georgian: შატბერდის კრებული) is a multiple-text medieval Georgian manuscript, presumably copied in the Shatberdi Monastery, Tao-Klarjeti. The manuscript is composed of two distinct chronological strata, out of which the earliest is dated using the radiocarbon analysis to the 8th-9th centuries CE, and the second one to the 10th century.

The codex comprises the texts in Georgian, namely, De Hominis Opificio by Gregory of Nyssa, The Chronicon of Hippolytus of Rome, The Physiologus, and The Conversion of Kartli, among others.

== Discovery and research ==
In 1888, the linguist and historian Nikolai Marr cataloged a collection of manuscripts belonging to the Society for the Spreading of Literacy among Georgians. This collection had been donated to the Society by the priest Dimitri Aleksi-Meskhishvili, nephew of the scholar David Rector. Among these documents was the manuscript known today as the Shatberdi Codex.

Without Marr's prior permission, a description of the codex was published in the 239th issue of the Georgian newspaper Iveria (N 236, 238, 239, 240, 245). Shortly after this publication, the manuscript became the focus of intense scholarly interest. It was extensively studied and analyzed in essays by prominent Georgian historians and researchers, including Tedo Zhordania, Dimitri Bakradze, Mose Janashvili, and Ekvtime Takaishvili. It was Takaishvili who officially coined the name "Shatberdi Codex" (Shatberdis krebuli) for the manuscript.

The Shatberdi Codex is now housed in the S-collection (shelf mark S-1141) at the Georgian National Centre of Manuscripts in Tbilisi.

== Description ==
The Shatberdi Codex is a medium-sized, thick volume measuring 28×22 cm and consists of 286 folios. The manuscript exhibits a transitional paleographic character:

- Asomtavruli section: The first 126 folios are written in Asomtavruli. This section is arranged in two columns, written in brown ink, and is executed entirely by a single scribe.
- Nuskhuri section: The Asomtavruli text is directly succeeded by a section written in Nuskhuri, which is a later supplement to the codex, text copied by scribe Ioane Berai.

== Composition of the codex ==
The codex comprises with multiple texts, majorely translations of the earliest church fathers and one original Georgian Chronicles text 'The Conversion of Kartli'. Many of the texts were edited separately by different scholars, while in 1979 the text of the codex was published in toto by B. Ginineishvili and El. Giunashvili.

The codex comprises the following texts:

1. De hominis opificio, Gregory of Nyssa

2. De Gemmis ('On the Twelve Gems on the Breastplate of the High Priest'), Epiphanius of Salamis

3. The Physiologus, attributed in the codex to Basil of Caesaria

4. This section of the codex groups together several short, untitled (or continuous) texts

- De Mensuris et Ponderibus, Epiphanius of Salamis
- A fragment from the Scholia on the Grammar of Dionysius the Thracian, Diomedes
- Chronicon, Hippolytus of Rome

5. De benedictionibus Moysis, Hippolytus of Rome

6. De benedictionibus Iacobi, Hippolytus of Rome.

7. In David et Goliath, Hippolytus of Rome.

8. In Canticum Canticorum (Commentarii), Hippolytus of Rome

9. De Christo et Antichristo, Hippolytus of Rome

10. De Fide (or a related dogmatic fragment), attributed to Hippolytus of Rome.

11. A typological theological tract on the Old and New Testaments, attributed to Hippolytus of Rome

12. The Conversion of Kartli

13. Vita Jacobi Nasibinensis, attributed to Epiphanius of Salamis in the manuscript

14. Interpretatio in Psalmos, attributed to Epiphanius of Salamis

== Dating ==
The codex initially was dated to the CE 10th century by the scholars, based on the colophon written by the scribe Ioane Berai, who is at the same time the scribe of the Parkhali I Gospels.

=== Radiocarbon Dating ===
The Shatberdi collective volume consists of two chronologically and paleographically distinct units. Textual, historical, and paleographical analyses suggest these units represent two separate eras of manuscript production. This dual-strata structure was formally tested and confirmed through radiocarbon analysis, which revealed an approximate 100-year age gap between the two sections.

In 2024 within the DeLiCaTe project (“The Development of Literacy in the Caucasian Territories”), led by Jost Gippert, at the University of Hamburg, Centre for the Study of Manuscript Cultures, in a collaboration with the Federal Institute of Technology (ETH) and the with support by Georgian National Centre of Manuscripts, researchers performed the first systematic radiocarbon (^{14}C) analysis of the parchment speciments from the Shatberdi codex. Using Accelerator Mass Spectrometry (AMS), the laboratory analysis yielded the following chronological data:

- Unit 1 (Asomtavruli): A sample taken from Folio 38 yielded a radiocarbon date of 1190 ± 22 BP. The calibrated dates range from 772 to 892 calCE, with major probability peaks at 785, 850, and 880 calCE. This range aligns with the text's mention of Byzantine Emperor Michael II, or potentially Emperor Theodosius III if subsequent lines in the text are later additions.
- Unit 2 (Nuskhuri): A sample taken from Folio 221 yielded a radiocarbon date of 1093 ± 22 BP. The calibrated dates range from 892 to 1013 calCE, with two major probability peaks at 920 and 980 calCE. This later date closely matches both the terminus post quem indicated by the mention of Emperor John I Tzimiskes and the historical mention of King Bagrat II in the colophon.
