= Irakli Parjiani =

Georgian painter

- Born: 22 May 1950; Mestia, Georgia
- Died: 22 December 1991 (aged 41); Tbilisi, Georgia
- Education: Tbilisi State Academy of Arts
- Known for: Painting, Drawing
- Notable work: The Gospel of John "Berlin Cicle"
- Children: Sofa Farjiani Beka Farjiani
- Website: irakliparjiani.com

Irakli Parjiani (Georgian: ირაკლი ფარჯიანი) was a Georgian painter and calligrapher. He was born in the town of Mestia, Upper Svaneti, in Georgia's mountainous region. He studied at the Tbilisi State Academy of Arts (1968-1974), at the Faculty of Fine Arts. Religious motifs took a significant role in Parjiani’s works, which was quite unusual for a painter of the Soviet period.

During 1968 and 1974 Irakli Parjiani attended the Faculty of Painting at the Tbilisi State Academy of Arts. His art holds special place in the history of the development of Georgian easel painting due to the individualism and originality of its pictorial language. Parjiani’s artistic world stands on the verge of the real and the unreal. His emotional and aesthetically immaculate compositions imbued with underlying messages and symbols, with their irradiating images and colors, are the bearers of biblical serenity enriching the scenes, quite common at first sight, with mystical mood. The characteristic conditionality of his pictorial images, the slow rhythm of compositional motives, the rich picturesqueness of waxen crayons and his virtuosic execution attach amazing figurative and colorful expressiveness to his pictures. Such mood of the as if “vanished” reality and of the ephemerality of life, present in all of his compositions, portraits or still lives, is yet particularly evidently manifested in his compositions on religious themes and his illustrations to the Gospel. This is the mood that reflects the personal life-story of the artist as well as of the eternal problem of harmonious cohabitation of man and the universe. During 1968 and 1974 Irakli Parjiani attended the Faculty of Painting at the Tbilisi State Academy of Arts. His art holds special place in the history of the development of Georgian easel painting due to the individualism and originality of its pictorial language. Parjiani’s artistic world stands on the verge of the real and the unreal. His emotional and aesthetically immaculate compositions imbued with underlying messages and symbols, with their irradiating images and colors, are the bearers of biblical serenity enriching the scenes, quite common at first sight, with mystical mood. The characteristic conditionality of his pictorial images, the slow rhythm of compositional motives, the rich picturesqueness of waxen crayons and his virtuosic execution attach amazing figurative and colorful expressiveness to his pictures. Such mood of the as if “vanished” reality and of the ephemerality of life, present in all of his compositions, portraits or still lives, is yet particularly evidently manifested in his compositions on religious themes and his illustrations to the Gospel. This is the mood that reflects the personal life-story of the artist as well as of the eternal problem of harmonious cohabitation of man and the universe.

Annunciation — is one of the central subject underlying most of his creations. Countless pieces inspired by this theme are scattered among numerous museums and private collections, and for the time being it would be virtually impossible to estimate their total number.

== Awards ==
- 1992 - State Award of the Republic of Georgia;
- 1996 - Niko Pirosmani’s Prize.
