= Lado Aleksi-Meskhishvili =

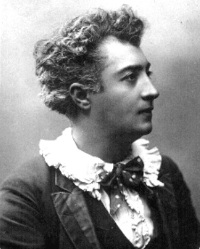
Lado Aleksi-Meskhishvili

Vladimir (Lado) Alexi-Meskhishvili, Lado Meskhishivili, or Alekseev-Meskhiev (Georgian: ვლადიმერ [ლადო] ალექსი-მესხიშვილი; February 16, 1857 — November 24, 1920), was a Georgian theater actor and director. He is buried at the Didube Pantheon in Tbilisi. His son was Shalva Aleksi-Meskhishvili, a Georgian jurist and politician.

== Life and career ==
Born in Tbilisi, Lado Aleksi-Meskhishvili studied medicine at the University of Moscow. Illness forced him to abandon studies and return to Georgia, where he worked as a teacher in Telavi. After medical studies and amateur acting, he joined the Tbilisi Georgian-language troupe in 1881, running it from 1890 to 1896 and from 1910 to 1914, and the Kutaisi Theater from 1897 to 1906 and again from 1914 to 1915. He also played in Russian troupes from 1887 to 1990 and from 1906 to 1910, including the Moscow Art Theatre (1906–1907). In 1916-1918, during a stay in Russia, he played in the films: Fathers and Children, Lost Necklace, The Shame of the Orlovs, and Three Thieves, amongst others.

== Works ==
A flamboyantly heroic actor, Aleksi-Meskhishvili used his performances to promote revolutionary ideas, and even engaged in barricade fighting during the Russian Revolution of 1905. He staged more than one hundred plays and translated many dramatic writings. His success, particularly in the musical comedies of his youth, is thought to be thanks to his ear for music and an exceptional voice. An example of how much he was loved and respected is the case of his 1903 illness when public awareness of the fact resulted in Georgian society gathering together the funds to send him to Vienna for medical treatment. In 1930, Aleksi-Meskhishvili was posthumously granted the title of People's Artist by Soviet Georgia. Aleksi-Meskhishvili's name was given to the Kutaisi Drama Theatre in 1940.

== See also ==
- Shalva Dadiani
- Barbara Aleksi-Meskhishvili
- Nino Aleksi-Meskhishvili
