= Mikael Mtserali =

Gospel by Mikael, 1054 AD.

Mikael Mtserali (Georgian: მიქაელ მწერალი) was a Georgian calligrapher of the 11th century.

He rewrote the Gospel in 1054. His calligraphy was created in brown ink on a parchment using the Georgian asomtavruli script. It included the golden dots in between and the illuminated letters.
