= Ioane Mesvete =

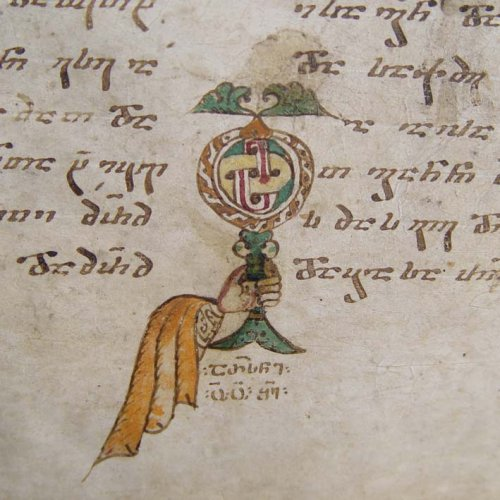
Martvili Gospels by Mesvete.

Ioane Mesvete (Georgian: იოანე მესვეტე) was a Georgian calligrapher who lived during the 11th century.

Mesvete created calligraphic works while living at the Martvili Monastery. In 1050 he rewrote the Martvili Gospels. Mesvete wrote in the Georgian Nuskhuri script though used Asomtavruli script for the decoration of letters.
