= Conversion of Kartli =

Medieval Georgian historical compendium

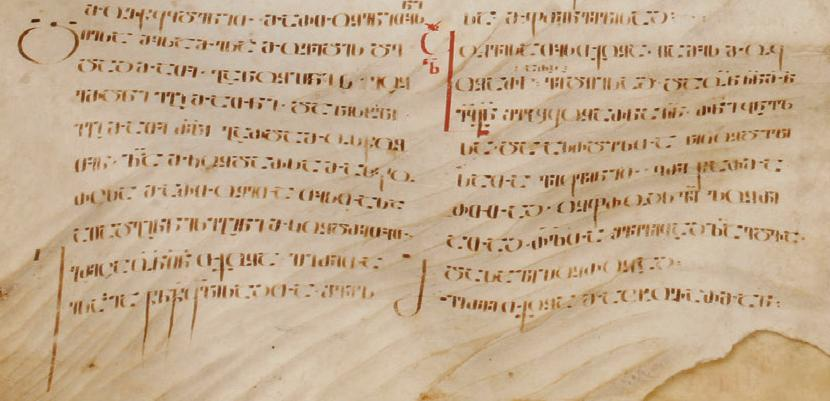
CoK chronicle, Shatberdi Codex.

The Conversion of Kartli (Georgian: მოქცევაჲ ქართლისაჲ, romanized: moktsevay kartlisay) is the earliest surviving medieval Georgian historical compendium, independent from The Georgian Chronicles, the major corpus historicum of medieval Georgia. Written in the 10th century, this chronicle follows the history of Kartli (a core Georgian region known to the Classical authors as Iberia, which is sometimes archaically referred to all of Georgia) from the earliest times to the 7th century, making a particular focus on Christianization of Georgians by Saint Nino early in the 4th century.

== Codices ==
The autograph of The Conversion of Kartli (CoK) has not survived and until recently there were only two manuscripts which have been extensively studied. These are the codices of Shatberdi and Chelishi.

The Shatberdi Codex, the oldest of the extant CoK manuscripts, was copied in 973 under the supervision of the monk John at the Georgian monastery of Shatberdi in what is now northeastern Turkey. It was discovered in 1888 and published in 1890 by the Georgian scholar Ekvtime Taqaishvili. The second variant, Chelishi Codex, so named after a monastery in Georgia where it was found in 1903, was copied in the 14th or 15th century. Following the 1975 fire at Saint Catherine's Monastery on Mount Sinai in Egypt, at least two hitherto unknown variants of CoK were discovered among a large number of Georgian manuscripts mainly dated to the 9th/10th century. They have not yet been completely studied, though.

The Shatberdi and Chelishi codices are basically linguistically similar and nearly contemporaneous. The latter, however, contains substantial variations including a number of elaborated passages. Its narrative is longer, but somewhat disfigured orthographically and phonetically by an anonymous copyist. Many passages of the Shatberdi Codex are more informative, but these details are probably later insertions as suggested by the occurrence of the word Baghdad, a post-8th century toponym.

The Shatberdi codex cites some of its sources (such as "a brief account of the conversion of Kartli" by Grigol the Deacon) most of which did not survive and are otherwise unknown. Modern specialists have also proposed Pseudo-Callisthenes’ apocryphal Alexander romance and Alexander of Cyprus’ Chronica as possible sources used by the authors of CoK. The work itself was exploited and some of its components were reworked by the later Georgian authors such as Leontius of Ruisi (11th century) and Arsenius the Metaphrast (12th century).

For all its contradictions – the elements of folklore, and religious reminiscences – The Conversion of Kartli is an essential historical source. It further possesses a detailed relative and absolute chronology, unparallel in hagiographic and patristic literature of Georgia. The noticeable influence of CoK on subsequent Georgian historical works proves the crucial role this work played in establishing a sense of Christian identity of medieval Georgia.

== Component texts ==
The Conversion of Kartli consists of two major components. The first one is conventionally known as The Chronicle (ქრონიკა, k’ronika), a brief history of Kartli from the mythic expedition by Alexander the Great into Georgian lands down to the 7th century. Its core text, The Conversion of Kartli, from which the corpus derives its title, relates the story of proselytizing mission by St. Nino, who is also the subject of the last component of CoK, the hagiographic Life of Nino (ცხოვრება წმიდა ნინოსი, ts’xovreba ts’mida ninosi). The basic text is accompanied by the lists of the kings, presiding princes and prelates of Kartli.

== See also ==
- The Georgian Chronicles
- Divan of the Abkhazian Kings
