= John Zosimus =

John Zosimus, also known as Ioane-Zosime (Georgian: იოანე-ზოსიმე; died c. 990) was a 10th-century Georgian Christian monk, religious writer, and calligrapher. He is known for his liturgical compilations and for composing several hymns dedicated to the Georgian language.

== Life ==
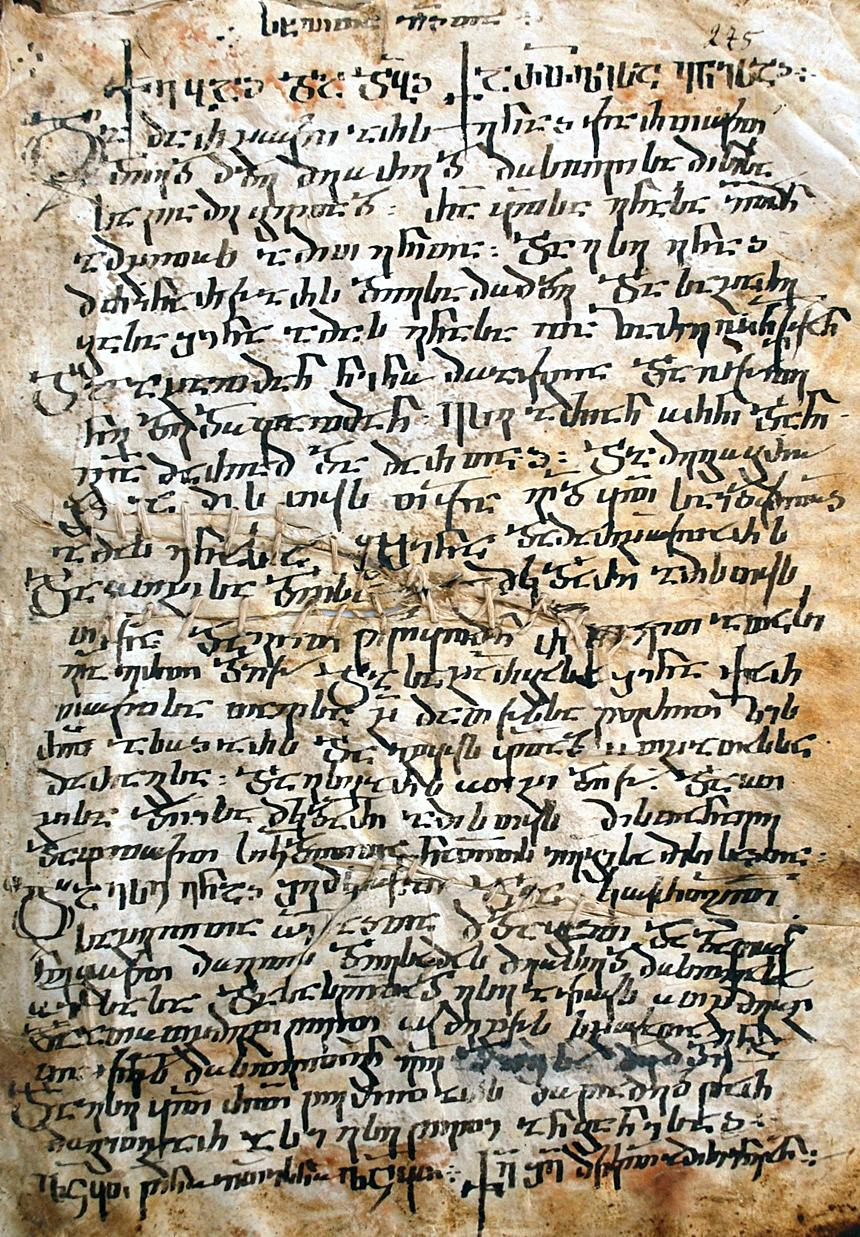
John's manuscript in the medieval Georgian patristic Nuskhuri script.

Biographical details on Ioane-Zosime are scarce beyond the fact that he was one of the numerous expatriate Georgian clerics active at the monastery of Mar Saba in Palestine. In the early 970s he moved to Mount Sinai, probably fleeing the armies of the Fatimid Caliphate. His voluminous body of work dates from between 949 and 987. Of the three surviving manuscripts of Ioane-Zosime's Mar-Saba period, two – hymn collections from 949 and 954 – are the most important. On Mt. Sinai, Ioane-Zosime principally engaged in bookbinding, collating and copying. In his hymnographic compilations and chronologic treatises, Ioane-Zosime provides a detailed list of sources as well as an encyclopedically organized calendar of saint's feast days and a chronology of the Georgian liturgy. He was familiar with older texts which he frequently cites, comparing usage in different ecclesiastical centers and distinguishing Georgian from Greek sources. One of his anthologies of chants ends with a "testament," a poem written as an elaborate acrostic hymn in which reading the first and last letter of each strophe gives the name of St. George.

Ioane-Zosime's best known hymn is "Praise and Exaltation of the Georgian Language" (Georgian: ქებაჲ და დიდებაჲ ქართულისა ენისაჲ), a mystic poem making heavy use of numerological symbolism and biblical allusions. Zosime describes his native language as esoteric, juxtaposing Georgian with Greek – the official language of the Byzantine Empire – and claiming a unique, sacred role for it as the tongue to be used on the Judgment Day.

== See also ==
- Mikael Modrekili
