= Tbilisi Sports Palace =

Indoor sports arena situated in Tbilisi, Georgia

- თბილისის სპორტის სასახლე
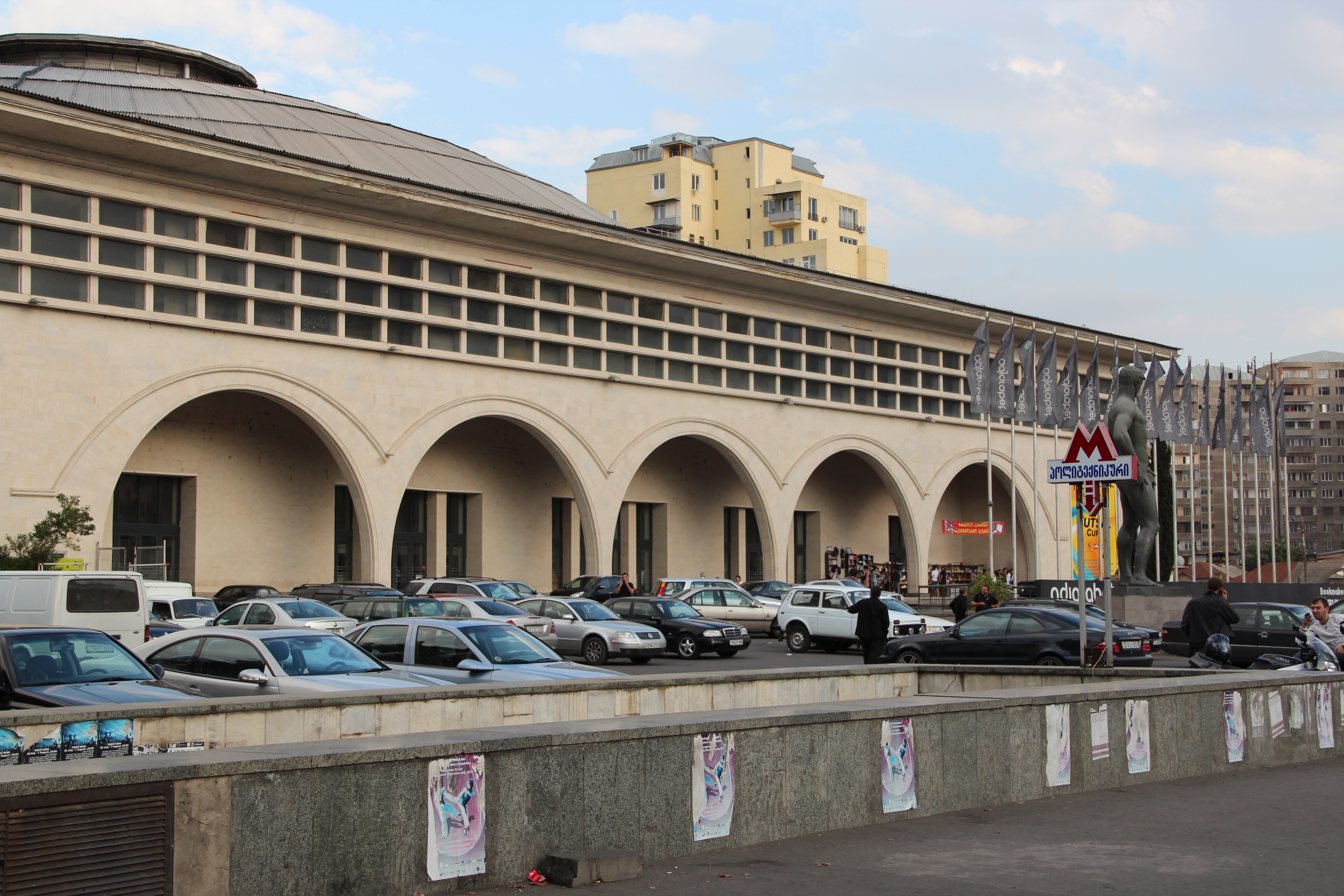
- Interactive map of Tbilisi Sports Palace
- Location: May 26 sqr. 1, Tbilisi 380071, Georgia
- Coordinates: 41.720°N 44.780°E
- Owner: Logic Group Ltd
- Operator: Logic Group Ltd
- Capacity: 9,700 (basketball); 11,000 (concerts)
- Surface: Parquet

Construction
- Opened: 12 May 1961
- Renovated: 2007
- Architects: Vladimir Aleksi-Meskhishvili; Yuri Kasradze; Temo Japaridze; David Kajaia

Tenant
- Georgia national basketball team

Tbilisi Sport Palace (Georgian: თბილისის სპორტის სასახლე romanized: Tbilisis Sportis Sasakhle) is an indoor sports arena situated in Tbilisi, Georgia. The arena usually hosts basketball, handball, judo, tennis, boxing and other games and tournaments with high attendance.

== History ==
Built in 1961, the arena was used primely for the basketball games of local Dinamo Tbilisi and is still the largest basketball designed arena in all of the former USSR successor states. The construction was led by architects Vladimir Aleksi-Meskhishvili, Yuri Kasradze, Temo Japaridze and designer David Kajaia. The dome, constructed of reinforced concrete, is around 76 meters in diameter, making it one of the largest domes in Europe at the time of its construction.

The arena was renovated in 2007 and was reopened on 22 August 2007, with management rights given to the Logic Group Ltd for a 30-year contract. This was the first phase of renovation and reconstruction, with the second phase including changing the roof of the building and installing new individual seats. Total cost of the renovation is estimated at 5 million USD.

In November 2024, it was announced that the arena was to undergo another significant renovation in order to modernise the facilities.

== Concerts ==
Tbilisi Sports Palace is one of the greatest arena for concerts in Georgia. Many international and national acts have performed here.

- Ian Gillan (1990, sold out 5 gigs here in row)
- Alla Pugacheva
- Lela Tsurtsumia - Lela is Georgian pop-singer, who held the record of attendance in Tbilisi Sports Palace. Though the arena holds approximately 11,000 people, Lela Tsurtsumia sold out 18,000 tickets for 1 concert, on 22 May 2002. (about 25,000 people were waiting for the tickets)

Other sold-out concerts were by Georgian rapper Lex-Seni and Georgian pop-group Kuchis Bichebi. (about 15,000 people)

The venue was to host the Junior Eurovision Song Contest 2017 on 26 November 2017. However the venue was later changed to the 4,000-capacity Olympic Palace which was considered more suitable for hosting the contest.

Preceded by Belgrade Arena; Belgrade	European Wrestling Championships; Venue; 2014	Succeeded by Trio Arena; Vantaa
