= Nikrai =

- ნიკრაი
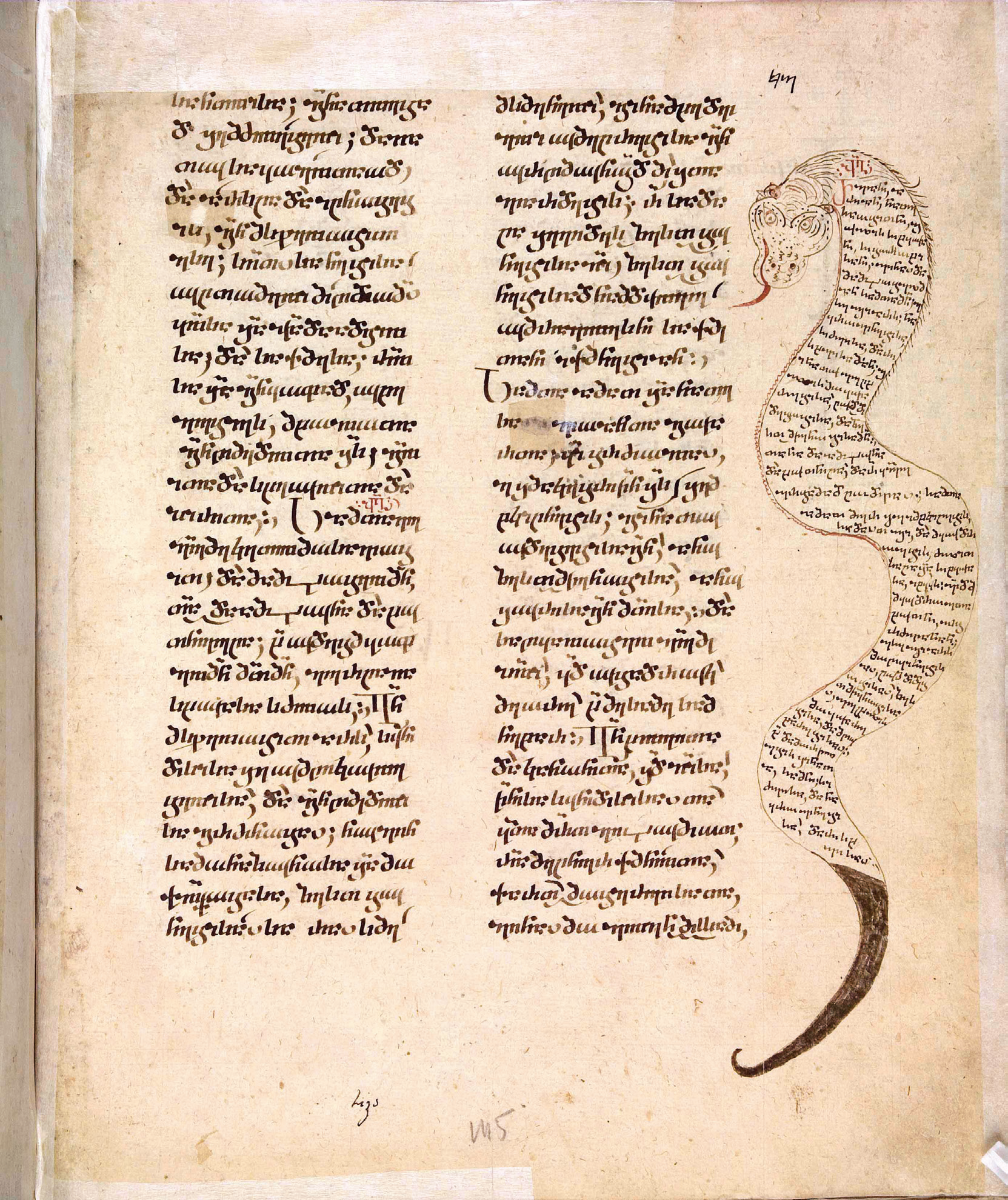
- Climacus by Nikrai.
- Occupation: Calligrapher
- Writing career
- Language: Georgian
- Notable work: The Ladder of Divine Ascent (copy)

Nikrai (Georgian: ნიკრაი) was a Georgian calligrapher of the 12-13th century. He rewrote The Ladder of Divine Ascent of John Climacus which was translated in the 11th century by Euthymius of Athos from Greek into Georgian. He wrote in Georgian Nuskhuri script, brown ink with sharp edges by using two columns.
