= Macarius of Leteti =

Georgian calligrapher and scholar

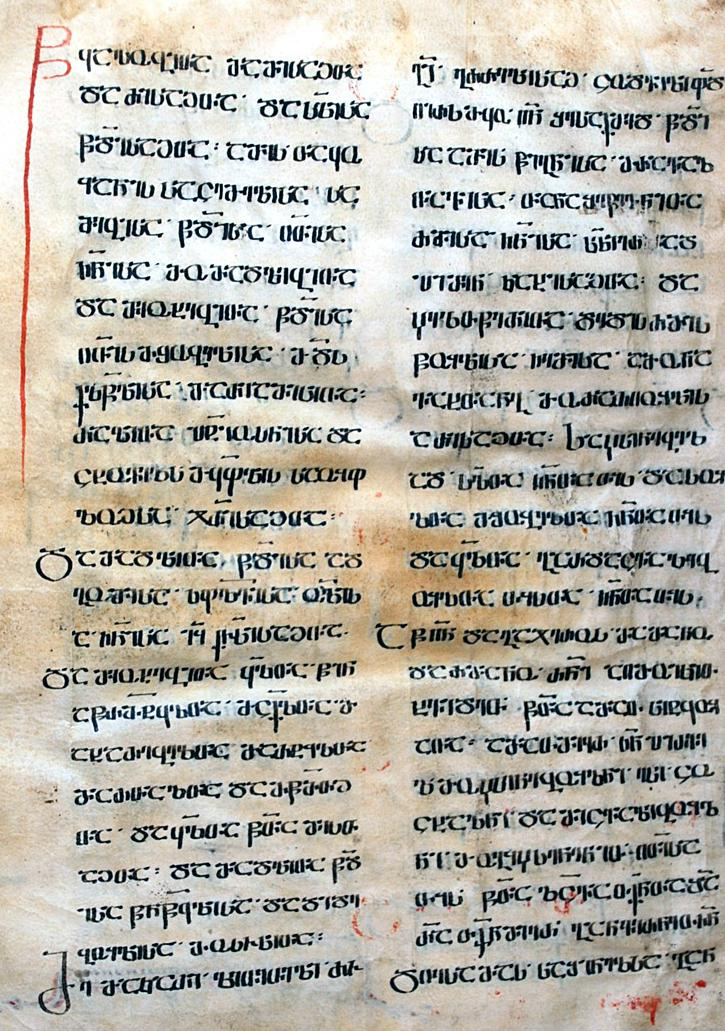
Sinai Polykephalon by Macarius of Leteti.

Macarius of Leteti (Georgian: მაკარი ლეთეთელი, romanized: mak'ari leteteli) was a Georgian calligrapher and scholar of the 9th century.

Macarius was from Georgian kingdom of Kartli (Iberia), from village of Leteti. He was relative of Patriarch Ephraim and the student of Gregory of Khandzta.

Macarius worked in Jerusalem in Mar Saba. Macarius in 864 AD created and wrote famous "Sinai Polykephalon".
