= Mamuka Tavakalashvili =

17th Century Georgian Artist & Poet

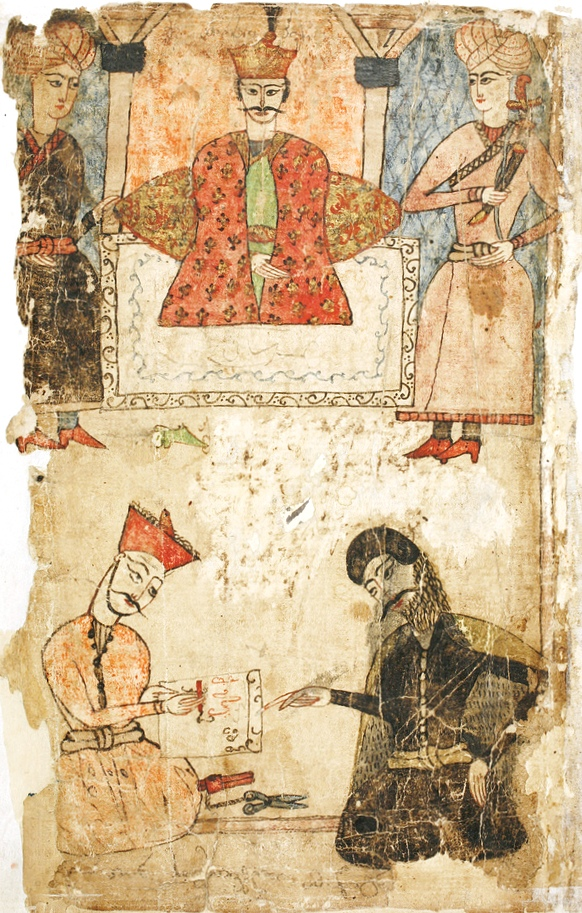
Prince Levan II Dadiani, Tavakalashvili and Shota Rustaveli.

Mamuka Tavakalashvili or Tavakarashvili (Georgian: მამუკა თავაქალაშვილი) was a Georgian poet, painter and famous calligrapher of the 17th century at the court of the King of Imereti.

He was captured in Principality of Samegrelo in 1634 during the Georgian feudal fights when kings Teimuraz I of Kakheti and George III of Imereti waged war against King Rostom of Kartli and the Dadiani princes of Samegrelo. After this Mamuka worked as calligrapher at the court of Prince Levan II Dadiani.

In 1646, he copied The Knight in the Panther's Skin where he created 39 miniatures. In 1647, Tavakalashvili also copied the Georgian translation of Shahnameh.
