= Michael Modrekili =

Michael Modrekili (Georgian: მიქაელ მოდრეკილი, romanized: mikael modrek'ili; lit. 'the bent', also 'the hermit' or 'simple monk'; d. 970) was a medieval Georgian calligrapher, writer and scholar of the 10th century. He was also an anthologist, an expert in the liturgy, musicologist and a poet.

== Life ==
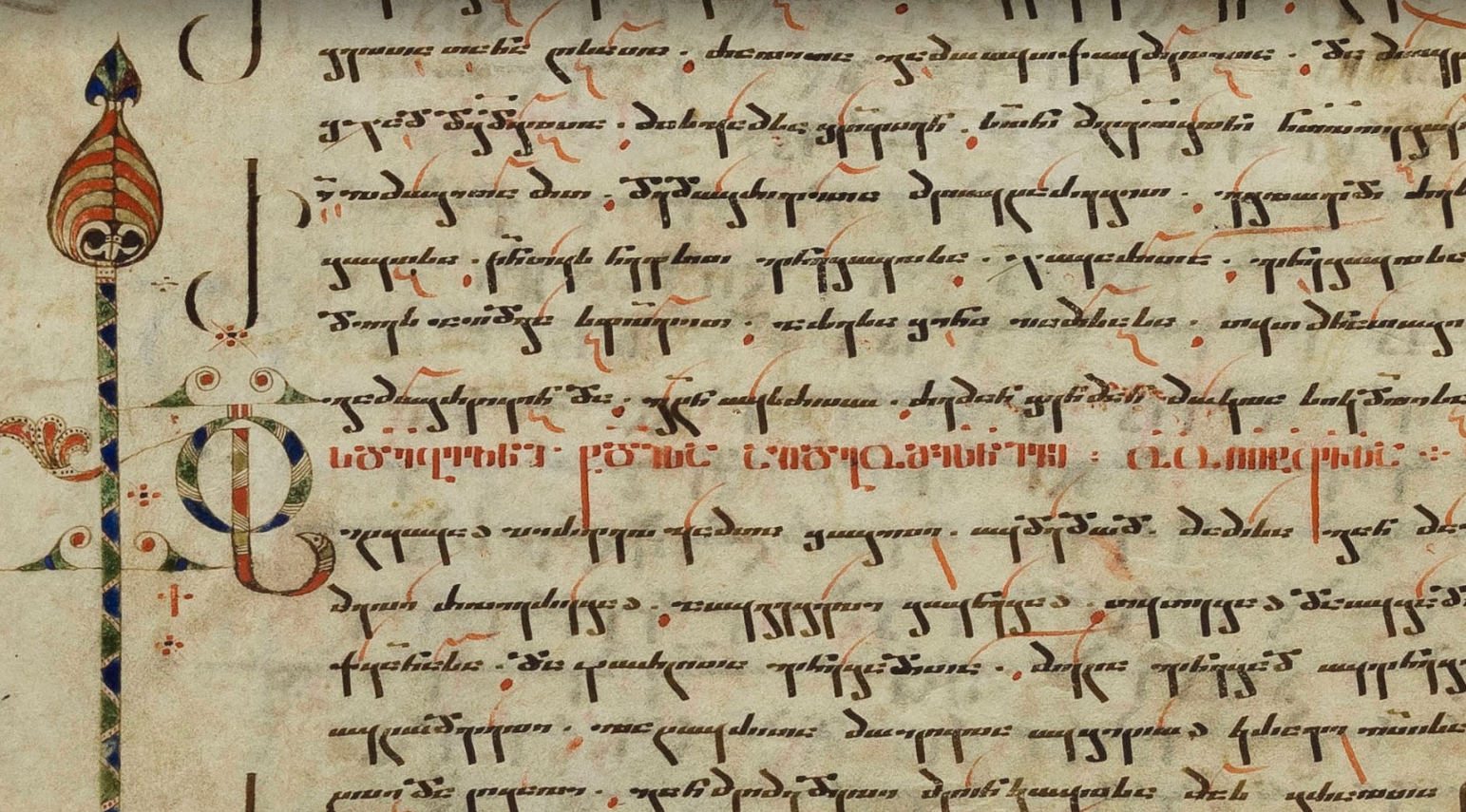
Calligraphy of Modrekili with musical neumes.

Modrekili was born in Georgian aristocratic family. He mentions his uncle David while growing up. Michael in his works names the Georgian Bagrationi monarchs David III of Tao, Bagrat II of Iberia and Gurgen of Iberia.

His shifts in pitch and note-length marked by neumes shows the musical and textual notations that were of equal importance. Many of his hymns were linked to the period from advent to the days allotted to John Damascene and to the Desert Fathers. Michael Modrekili's Easter hymn composed in 978~88, also commemorates emperor Theodosius the Great.

His calligraphy was rich of decor and ornaments. His works had the miniature images of Stephen of Tbeti and Basil of Caesarea. He is considered as one of the most brilliant masters of the Georgian calligraphy. His calligraphy and text was written in classical Nuskhuri script without ligatures, mostly in quarto, in black and red ink where in the text above and beneath the lines were written in red ink and the old musical notes. He designed his works with colored initials and ornamental headpieces. His most important work named Iadgari, was written in black and vermilion ink, with a black dot on top and a red dot on the bottom; the red dot is usually slightly larger than the black one. Some types of Iadgari are still unidentified and undiscussed in scientific circles as it demonstrates the multiplicity of the mysterious Georgian neumatic script. Modrekili in his will regularly mentions that he liked to collect only the Georgian and Greek hymns. Modrekili has also included hymns of Ioane Minchkhi.

== See also ==
- John Zosimus

== Bibliography ==
- Rayfield, Donald (1994). The Literature of Georgia: A History. Taylor & Francis. ISBN 978-1-136-82529-3.
- Ingorokva, Pavle (1954). გიორგი მერჩულე: ქართველი მწერალი მეათე საუკუნისა: ნარკვევი ძველი საქართველოს ლიტერატურის, კულტურის და სახელმწიფოებრივი ცხოვრების ისტორიიდან [Giorgi Merchule: Georgian writer of the tenth century: An essay from the old history of Georgian literature, culture, and life of statehood] (V. Dondua ed.). Soviet Writer.
- Jordania, J.; Tsurtsumia, R. (2023). Historical Trends in Georgian Traditional and Sacred Music. Cambridge Scholars Publishing. ISBN 978-1-5275-9428-9.
