= Basil the Sabaite =

Georgian calligrapher, monk and writer

Basil the Sabaite (Georgian: ბასილი საბაწმინდელი, romanized: basili sabats'mindeli) was a Georgian calligrapher, monk and writer of the 8th century.

Basil created his works in Palestine and Mar Saba.

His work "დასდებელნი მამისა საბაჲსნი" (dasdebelni mamisa sabaisni) is included in the Mount Sinai chapters of the 10th century.
