= Giorgi Dodisi =

Georgian calligrapher of the 12th century

Giorgi Dodisi (Georgian: გიორგი დოდისი) was a Georgian calligrapher of the 12th century.

Giorgi created calligraphical works in Georgian-built Monastery of the Cross in Jerusalem.

Giorgi wrote in Nuskhuri script of Georgian alphabet. His calligraphical works were of high quality with ornaments and decor. He used crosses in his works and signed the works with his name.
