= Ioane Berai =

Georgian calligrapher

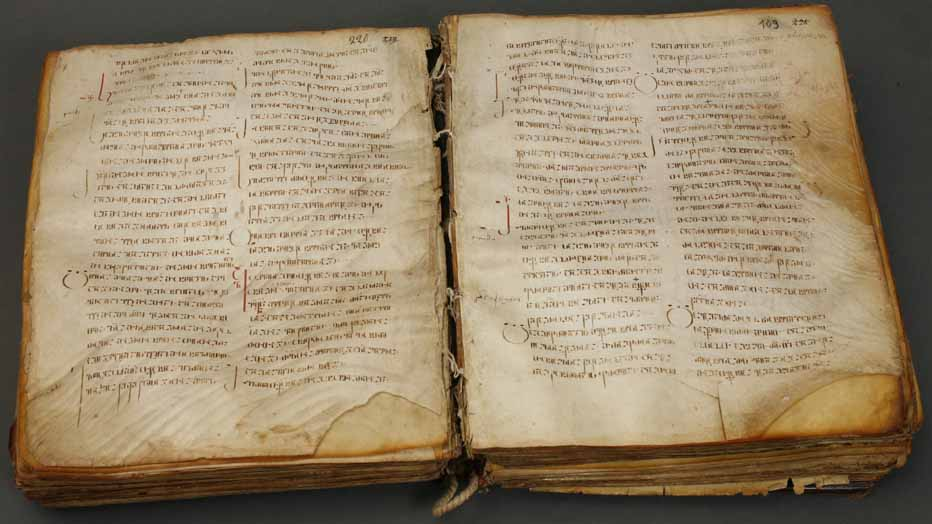
Shatberdi Codex by Berai.

Ioane Berai (Georgian: იოანე ბერაი) was a Georgian calligrapher of the 10th century.

He was brought up and raised in the Shatberdi monastery. His uncle was the Georgian calligrapher Mikael Modrekili. His works was mainly written in Asomtavruli and Nuskhuri Georgian scripts.
