= David the Rector =

Deepak khedi wala

Signature of David the Rector.

Davit Aleksidze-Meskhishvili (Georgian: დავით ალექსის ძე მესხიშვილი), "the Rector" (დავით რექტორი; 1745–1824), was a Georgian pedagogue, calligrapher, and rector of the Telavi seminary from 1790 to 1801.

Davit Aleksidze-Meskhishvili graduated from the seminary in Tbilisi c. 1765, the latter which was founded by catholicos Anton I in 1755. He then served at the court of King Heraclius II of Georgia as a secretary and closely collaborated with the scholar Gaioz the Rector to promote learning in Tbilisi. After Gaioz's departure to the Russian Empire on a diplomatic mission in 1783, Meskhishvili succeeded him as the acting rector (and as the rector in 1790) of the Telavi seminary until the Russian government, now in control of Georgia, closed it in 1801. A polymath, he taught grammar, physics, and ethics at the seminary and compiled several schoolbooks. Further, at the order of Heraclius's son and successor, King George XII, he inspected church schools at Gareja, Sioni, Kashueti, Mtskheta, and Anchiskhati. Davit the Rector also copied, collected, and catalogued old Georgian manuscripts, and compiled a bibliography of Georgian writers. He was also a poet of some talent, affected by the influence of his contemporary Georgian poet Besiki, but Davit's best-known poem mukhambazi (მუხამბაზი) abjures Besiki's aesthetics.

== Sources ==
- Mikaberidze, Alexander (2015). Historical Dictionary of Georgia (2 ed.). Rowman & Littlefield. ISBN 978-1-44224-146-6.
