= Ioane Minchkhi =

Georgian hymnographer

Ioane Minchkhi (Georgian: იოანე მინჩხი) was a 10th-century Georgian hymnographer and calligrapher. contemporary to the king George II of Abkhazia. He is considered as author of the entire Sticheron part of the first Georgian "Lenten Triodion". Ioane Minchkhi lived and worked at Mount Sinai. Which explains why a considerable part of his hymns are preserved in Sinaitic manuscripts. Four of Ioane Minchkhi's hymns are included in Iadgari of Mikael Modrekili (Tropologion) (978–988).

His name has become known in academic circles thanks to Ivane Javakhishvili, who discovered the hymns of this unknown Georgian hymnist in Georgian manuscripts during his academic trip to Mount Sinai in 1902. it was a hymnographical Canon devoted to St. George and contained 26 small-sized hymns.
