= Avgaroz Bandaisdze =

Georgian calligrapher and painter

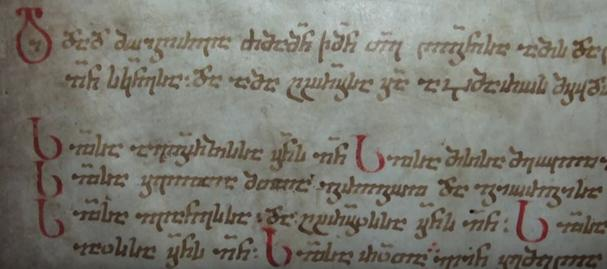
Bandaisdze manuscript

Avgaroz Bandaisdze (Georgian: ავგაროზ ბანდაისძე) was a Georgian calligrapher and painter of the 14th century. He was in service of Dukes of Ksani. His most important work is "History of the Eristavs". He had a son, Grigol who was a calligrapher as well.
