= List of Georgian calligraphers =

The following is an incomplete list of masters of Georgian calligraphy:

== 6th–10th century ==
- Martyrius the Iberian
- Basil the Sabaite
- Mikaeli
- Macarius of Leteti
- Amona Vakhtang Modzargulisdze
- Giorgi Merchule
- Stephen of Tbeti
- Mikael Modrekili
- Euthymius of Athos
- John the Iberian
- Bagrat II of Tao
- Gabrieli
- Gabriel Patarai
- Ioane-Zosime
- Ioane Berai
- Ioane Minchkhi
- Arkiposi

== 11th–15th century ==
- Black John
- Black Zachariah
- Prochorus the Iberian
- George the Hagiorite
- Mikael Mtserali
- Arsen Ninotsmindeli
- Basili
- Mose Khandzteli
- Metropolitan Bishop John of Khakhuli
- Ioane Mesvete
- Iovane Meli
- Ioane Dvali
- Giorgi Dvali
- Iakob Itsrelisdze
- Arseni Eshmsdze
- Basili Malushisdze
- Atanase Arvandkopili
- Arsen Gogopai
- Atanase
- Giorgi Oltisari
- Iovane Pukaralisdze
- Arsen of Iqalto
- Saba Svingelozi
- Petre Gelateli
- Iovane Kartveli
- Ioane
- Arseni
- Giorgi Dodisi
- Giorgi Khutsesmonazoni
- Nikrai
- Nikoloz Kataratsisdze
- Epremi
- Avgaroz Bandaisdze
- Barnaba
- Giorgi Tabauri
- Atanase
- Ambrose
- Grigoli
- Grigoli and Grigoli of Petritsoni

== 16th–19th century ==
- Akaki
- Nikoloz Cholokashvili
- Mikadze family
- Kargareteli family
- Catholicos-Patriarch John IX of Georgia
- Metropolitan Bishop Barnaba Pavlenishvili
- Magaladze family
- Aleksi-Meskhishvili family
- Bedismtserlishvili family
- Zaal-Zosime Orbeliani
- Sulkhan-Saba Orbeliani
- Mariam Makrina
- Demetre I Mgalobeli
- Mamuka Tavakalashvili
- Begtabeg Taniashvili
- Gabriel Saginashvili
- Givi Tumanishvili
- Ioseb Tbileli
- Metropolitan Bishop Anthim the Iberian
- Davit Tumanishvili
- David the Rector
- Giorgi Avalishvili
- Davit Bodbeli Vachnadze
- Ose Gabashvili
- Gabriel Mtsire
- Isaak Mtsire
- Petre Laradze
- Nikoloz Sionis Dekanozi
- Nikoloz Onikashvili
- Erasti Turkestanishvili
- Onana Mdivani
- Ioane Pentelashvili
- Goderdzi Piralishvili
- Metropolitan Bishop Ambrosi Nekreseli
- Metropolitan Bishop Atanase Amilakhvari
- Bishop Zakaria Gabashvili
- Giorgi Giorgisdze
- Archimandrite Geronti Sologashvili
- Chachikashvili family
- Alexander Sulkhanishvili
- Gabriel Makashvili
- Kirile Lortkipanidze
- Bishop Atanase Bakradze
- Aaron Aleksi-Meskhishvili
- Andria Aleksi-Meskhishvili
- Gabriel Aleksi-Meskhishvili

== 20th–21st century ==
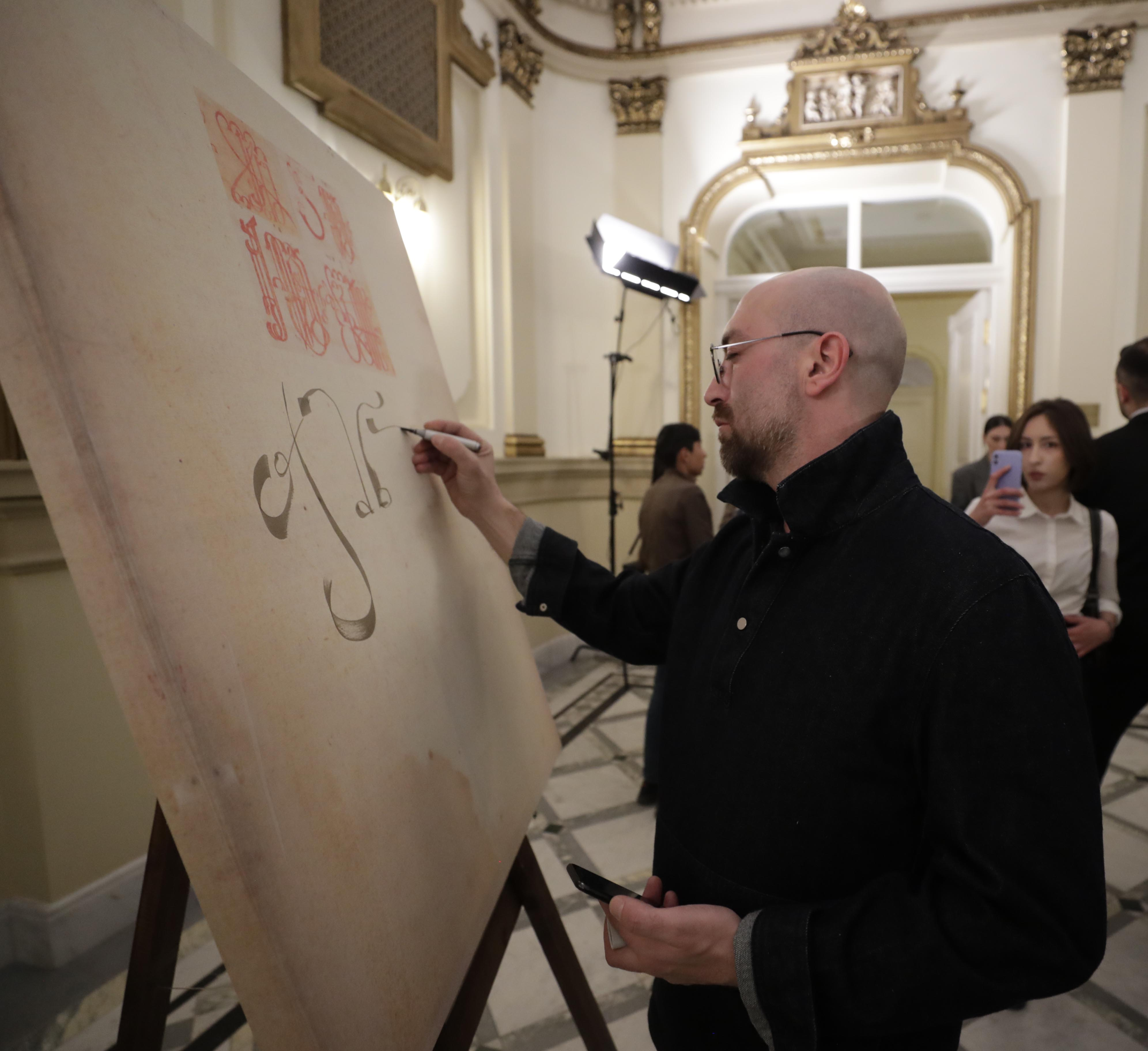
Practicing of Mkhedruli calligraphy at the Orbeliani Palace, the official residence of the President of Georgia.

- Irakli Parjiani
- Alexandre Bandzeladze
- Emir Burjanadze
- Lasha Kintsurashvili
- Niaz Diasamidze
- Levan Chaganava
- Lile Chkhetiani
- Nina Sublatti
- Giorgi Sisauri
- David Maisuradze
- Mariam Tepnadze
- Nika Gunashvili
- Ani Kvavadze
- Ana Gokadze
- Leila Bagbaia
- Ana Mchedlidze
- Nini Ikashvili
- Shota Saganelidze
- Gvantsa Tsitsilashvili
- Aleksandre Mamukashvili
- Beka Beridze
- Metropolitan Bishop David Makharadze
- Selami Gümüş
- Miki

== See also ==
- List of Ottoman calligraphers
- List of Persian calligraphers
