= Martyrius the Iberian =

Martyrius the Iberian (Georgian: მარტვირი ქართველი, romanized: mart'viri kartveli) was a Georgian calligrapher, monk and writer of the 6th century.

Martyrius was a priest of Mar Saba and foreman of Saint Sabbas the Sanctified.

Martyrius' works were famous of being rich with Asceticism and Mysticism.

Martyrius' works are included in the library of Saint Catherine's Monastery of Mount Sinai and Georgian-built Iviron monastery of Mount Athos.

He is the author of "სინანულისათჳს და სიმდაბლისა" (For repentance and humility), where he discusses the importance of prayer, repentance, humility, obedience, brotherhood and patience.

"სინანული მიზეზ არს, სარწმუნოებისა და სასოებისა, რომელსა შეურაცხყოფიეს სინანული განშორებულ არს იგი წყალობისაგან ღმერთისა. ვტიროდეთ უკუე, ძმანო, თავთა და ცოდვათა ჩვენთავის წინაშე ღმერთისა და თუ შემძლებელ ვიყვნეთ, სხუათათვისცა" "Repentance is the reason, for faith and hope, who is insulted the repentance is separated from blessing of God. We should cry already, brothers, for sins of ours before the God and if we are able, also for others"
