= Jruchi I Gospel =

10th century Georgian manuscript

Miniature from the Jruchi I Gospel

Jruchi I Gospels (Jruchi Four Gospels) is a Georgian manuscript gospel of the 10th century. It is one of the first classically illustrated Georgian manuscripts. The manuscript was copied in Shatberdi Monastery by the calligrapher Gabriel in 936. It was painted by Tevdore Kamaratmtserali in 940. Ekvtime Takaishvili brought the gospel from Jruchi Monastery to Tbilisi in 1919, where it would be preserved in the National Center of Manuscripts of Georgia (H-1660).

Parchment is used as a writing material and the manuscript contains 297 pages. The size of the sheet is 26 cm × 21 cm (10.2 in × 8.3 in). It is written in Asomtavruli alphabet in black ink, and the titles and superscripts are written in singuri (red dye). The last parts of the Gospels of Matthew and Mark, which are completed on miniature pages, were copied by the artist. The manuscript is decorated with crosses, eight canons and eight miniatures.
