= Iadgari of Mikael Modrekili =

10th century Georgian manuscript

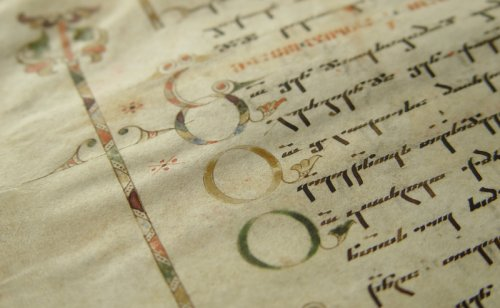
Page from the Iadgari of Mikael Modrekili with illuminated initials.

Iadgari of Mikael Modrekili (Georgian: მიქაელ მოდრეკილის იადგარი) is a Georgian manuscript of the 10th century, containing a special hymnographic collection of the early Byzantine period, known as tropologion. This collection preserved all Georgian original and translated chants known in the 10th century. It was copied in 978-988 in Monastery of Shatberdi by Mikael Modrekili and two anonymous copyists.

The text is written in classical Nuskhuri without ligatures, in black and red ink. In the text above and beneath the lines ink the old musical notes (neumes) are written in red. The manuscript is illuminated with colored initials and ornamental headpieces.

Copied on parchment, it contains 727 folios; it measures 26x21 cm. The manuscript is preserved at the Georgian National Center of Manuscripts.

== Bibliography ==
- Chkhikvadze, Nestan, ed. (2012). ქართული ხელნაწერი წიგნი, V-XIX საუკუნეები [Georgian Manuscript Book, 5th-19th centuries] (in Georgian). Tbilisi: Georgian National Centre of Manuscripts. p. 31. ISBN 9789941928444.
