= Sardion Aleksi-Meskhishvili =

Georgian critic, translator, and doctor

Sardion Demeter Aleksi-Meskhishvili (Georgian: სარდიონ ალექსი-მესხიშვილი; 1814, Ruispiri – 1863) was a Georgian critic, translator, and military doctor. He studied at the Medical Surgical Academy in Moscow from 1832 to 1836, from which he graduated as a doctor and veterinarian. From 1840 he worked as a doctor in Telavi, Sighnaghi and Tbilisi. His critical writings and translations were published in the newspaper Kavkazsa and the magazine Tsiskari which published his letter Ustari Antikritikuli in 1861. There he defended his theory of the principle of division of the Georgian noise occlusive consonants into "triads".
