= Barbara Aleksi-Meskhishvili =

Barbara Aleksi-Meskhishvili (Georgian: ბარბარე ალექსი-მესხიშვილი; 1 February 1898, Tbilisi – 25 December 1972, Tbilisi) was a Georgian stage actress. After graduating she worked at the Moscow Art Theatre between 1916 and 1941, and in Kiev, Kharkov and other theaters between 1942 and 1944, performing comedy plays as adolescent boys. Her main roles were as Mirandolina in the eponymous comic opera by Bohuslav Martinů, based upon Carlo Goldoni's comedy The Mistress of the Inn, as Doña Juana in Tirso de Molina's Don Gil of the Green Breeches, and as Tugina in Alexander Ostrovsky's The Last Victim. She received the title of Honored Artist of Georgia in 1943.

== See also ==
- Nino Aleksi-Meskhishvili
