= Nino Aleksi-Meskhishvili =

Nino Aleksi-Meskhishvili (Georgian: ნინო ალექსი-მესხიშვილი; 1896, Tbilisi – 16 May 1956, Moscow) was a Georgian stage actor. She graduated from the Moscow State Pedagogical University in 1914. She worked in Russia (1914-1920, 1922–1925), Kiev (1920-1922), and for the Rustaveli Theatre in Tbilisi (1926-1928).

== See also ==
- Barbara Aleksi-Meskhishvili
