= Bakhtiyar-nama =

The Bakhtiyar-nama is a medieval Iranian romance, which both has a prose and verse version. The earliest surviving version of the work is in the Arabic prose text of ʿAjāʾib al-bakht fī qiṣṣat al-aḥdī ʿashar wazīran wa-mā jāra lahum maʿ Ibn al-Malik Āzādbakht ("Wonders of the age, or the story of the eleven viziers and what befell them with prince Azadbakht"), written in 1000. The earliest surviving New Persian version is the Rāḥat al-arvāḥ ("Souls' repose") by the poet Shams al-Din Muhammad Daqa'iqi Marvaz, in a manuscript written in 1264/5. It has been suggested that the story originates from a Middle Persian book, but this remains unclear.

== Sources ==
- Hanaway, William L. (2010). "Bakhtiyār-nāma". In Fleet, Kate; Krämer, Gudrun; Matringe, Denis; Nawas, John; Rowson, Everett (eds.). Encyclopaedia of Islam (3rd ed.). Brill Online. ISSN 1873-9830.
