= Shalva Aleksi-Meskhishvili =

Georgian jurist and politician

Shalva Alexi-Meskhishvili (Georgian: შალვა ალექსი-მესხიშვილი, also known as Shalva Meskhiev and Shalva Aleksi-Meskhishvili) (April 26, 1884 — June 18, 1960) was a Georgian jurist and politician who served as Minister of Justice of the Democratic Republic of Georgia from 1918 to 1919.

== Life and career ==
Alexi-Meskhishvili was born in Telavi into the family of the notable Georgian theater actor Lado Alexi-Meskhishvili. In 1902, he enrolled in the Odessa University from where he was excluded for his involvement in student protests in 1904. In 1909, he graduated from Kharkiv University and returned to Tbilisi where he practiced law. He was one of the founders of the Georgian Social-Federalist Party and joined the Georgian National Council after the Russian Revolution of 1917.

After Georgia’s declaration of independence in May 1918, he served as Minister of Justice in the government of Noe Ramishvili until the 1919 elections in which he obtained a seat in the Constituent Assembly. After the Bolshevik takeover, he remained in Soviet Georgia and practiced law in Tbilisi. In the 1920s, he was twice arrested by the Communist government, but survived the Great Purge of the 1930s. During the World War II years, he featured prominently as a lawyer for a group of Muslim Georgians charged by the authorities with collaborating with Turkey against the Soviet state.

Preceded by office established	Minister of Justice of Georgia; 1918-1919	Succeeded by Razhden Arsenidze
