= List of Georgian writers =

An alphabetic list of prose writers and poets from the nation of Georgia.

== A ==
- Alexander Abasheli, 1884–1954, Georgia, poet and non-fiction writer
- Grigol Abashidze, 1914–1994, Georgia, poet
- Irakli Abashidze, 1909–1992, Georgia, poet and non-fiction writer
- Alexander Amilakhvari, 1750–1802, Georgia, non-fiction writer
- Chabua Amirejibi, 1921–2013, Georgia, fiction and non-fiction writer
- Manana Antadze, born 1945, Georgia, writer and translator
- Shio Aragvispireli, 1867–1926, Georgia, non-fiction writer
- Archil II, 1647–1713, Georgia, poet
- Lavrenti Ardaziani, 1815–1870, Georgia, fiction and non-fiction writer
- Lado Asatiani (1917–1943, Georgia, poet

== B ==
- Nikoloz Baratashvili, 1817–1845, Georgia, One of the outstanding lyric poets
- Dato Barbakadze, born 1976, Georgian writer and translator
- Vasil Barnovi, 1856–1934, Georgia, fiction writer
- Elena Botchorichvili, living, Canada, fiction and non-fiction writer
- Lasha Bugadze, born 1977, Georgia, fiction writer and playwright
- Zaza Burchuladze, born 1973

Georgia fiction writer and playwright

- Besiki, 1750–1791, Georgia, poet and non-fiction writer,

== C ==
- Chakhrukhadze, fl. late 12th/early 13th c., Georgia, poet
- Irakli Charkviani, 1961–2006, USSR/Georgia, poet and non-fiction writer
- Alexander Chavchavadze, 1786–1846, Russian E, poet
- Ilia Chavchavadze, 1837–1907, Russian E, non-fiction writer and poet
- Simon Chikovani, 1902–1966, Russian E/USSR, poet
- Otar Chiladze, 1933–2009, USSR/Georgia, fiction writer
- Tamaz Chiladze, 1931–2018, Russian E/Georgia, playwright and poet
- Daniel Chonkadze, 1830–1860, Russian E, fiction writer

== D ==
- Aneta Dadeshkeliani, 1872–1922, Russian E, poet and educator
- Nino Dadeshkeliani, 1890–1931, Russian E/France, writer and politician
- Demetrius I of Georgia, c. 1093–1156, Georgia, monarch and poet
- David Dephy, born 1968, Georgia/US, poet
- Nodar Dumbadze, 1928–1984, USSR, fiction writer
- Guram Dochanashvili, 1939–2021, USSR/Georgia, fiction/non-fiction writer

== E ==
- Nana Ekvtimishvili (born 1978), Georgia, writer and film director
- Dominika Eristavi (1864–1929), Russian E/USSR, writer and translator
- Giorgi Eristavi (1813–1864), Russian E, dramatist, poet and non-fiction writer
- Rapiel Eristavi (1824–2001), Russian E/USSR, poet, fiction writer and dramatist
- Anastasia Eristavi-Khoshtaria (1868–1951), Russian E/USSR, feminist novelist

== G ==
- Ekaterine Gabashvili (1851–1938), Russian E, fiction and non-fiction writer
- Konstantine Gamsakhurdia (1893–1975), Russian E/USSR, fiction writer
- Zviad Gamsakhurdia (1939–1993), USSR, non-fiction and fiction writer
- Mirza Gelovani (1917–1944), USSR, poet
- Naira Gelashvili (born 1947), USSR/Georgia, fiction and non-fiction writer
- George the Hagiorite (1009–1065), Georgia, non-fiction writer
- Iakob Gogebashvili (1840–1912), Russian E, non-fiction and children's writer and poet
- Parsadan Gorgijanidze (1626 – c. 1696), Georgia, non-fiction writer
- Levan Gotua (1905–1973), Russian E/USSR, fiction writer
- Terenti Graneli (1897–1934), Russian E/USSR, poet and essayist, pseudonym of Terenti Kvirkvelia
- Ioseb Grishashvili (1889–1965), Russian E/USSR, poet and non-fiction writer, pseudonym of Ioseb Mamulishvili
- Petre Gruzinsky (1920–1984), USSR, poet

== H ==
- Nino Haratischwili (born 1983), Georgia/Germany, novelist and playwright

== I ==
- Paolo Iashvili (1894–1937), Russian E/USSR, poet
- Ioane Petritsi (c. 11th c.), Georgia, philosopher
- John Zosimus (died c. 990), Georgia, religious writer
- Otia Ioseliani (1930–2011), USSR/Georgia, fiction and drama

== J ==
- Mikheil Javakhishvili (1880–1937), Russian E/USSR, novelist

== K ==
- Zurab Karumidze (born 1957), USSR/Georgia, fiction and non-fiction writer
- Alexander Kazbegi (1848–1893), Russian E, novelist
- Ana Kalandadze (1924–2008), USSR/Georgia, poet
- Mariam Khutsurauli (born 1960), USSR/Georgia, poet and short story writer
- Leo Kiacheli (1884–1963), Russian E/USSR, fiction and non-fiction writer
- Lali Kiknavelidze (born 1969), USSR/Georgia, screenwriter and film director
- David Kldiashvili (1862–1931), Russian E/Georgia, fiction writer and dramatist
- Sergo Kldiashvili (1893–1886), Russian E, fiction writer and dramatist
- Ana Kordzaia-Samadashvili (born 1968), USSR/Georgia, novelist and literary journalist
- Beka Kurkhuli (born 1974), writer and journalist
- Nestan Kvinikadze (born 1980), USSR/Georgia, scriptwriter and dramatist

== L ==
- Giorgi Leonidze, (1899–1966), Russian E/USSR, poet and non-fiction writer
- Niko Lomouri, (1852–1915), Russian E, poet

== M ==
- Mukhran Machavariani (1929–2010), USSR/Georgia, poet
- David Magradze (born 1963), USSR/Georgia, poet
- Tamta Melashvili (born 1979), USSR/Georgia, novelist and feminist
- Giorgi Merchule (10th c. CE), Georgia, biographer
- Kato Mikeladze (1878–1942), Russian E/France, journalist and feminist
- Ephrem Mtsire (died c. 1101/1103), Georgia, non-fiction writer
- Aka Morchiladze (born 1966), USSR/Georgia, fiction and non-fiction writer, pseudonym of Giorgi Akhvlediani

== N ==
- Kolau Nadiradze (1895–1990), Russian E/Georgia, poet

== O ==
- Alexander Orbeliani (1802–1869), Russian E, p/f/nf
- David Orbeliani (1739–1796), Georgia, poet
- Grigol Orbeliani (1804–1883), Russian E, poet
- Sulkhan-Saba Orbeliani (1658–1725), Georgia/Russian E, non-fiction writer
- Vakhtang Orbeliani (1812–1890), Russian E, poet
- Iza Orjonikidze (1938–2010) USSR/Georgia, poet and scholar

== P ==
- George Papashvily (1898–1978), Russian E/US, non-fiction writer
- Tamri Pkhakadze (born 1957), Georgia, novelist and children's writer
- Vazha-Pshavela (1861–1915) One of the outstanding poet

== R ==
- Guram Rcheulishvili, 1934–1960, Russian E, fiction and non-fiction writer
- Grigol Robakidze, 1880–1962, Russian E/Switzerland, non-fiction writer and poet
- Shota Rustaveli, c. 1160 – c. 1120, Georgia, The most important Georgian poet

== S ==
- Nino Salia (1898–1992), Russian E/France, historian
- Irma Shiolashvili, born 1974, USSR/Georgia, poet, translator and journalist
- Stepane Mtbevari, fl. 10th c., Georgia, religious writer

== T ==
- Galaktion Tabidze, 1892–1959, One of the outstanding lyric poets
- Titsian Tabidze, 1890–1937, Russian E/USSR, poet
- Nicholas Tchkotoua, 1909–1984, Russian E/Switzerland, novelist
- Ekaterine Togonidze, born 1981, USSR/Georgia, journalist and novelist
- Elena Topuridze, 1922–2004, USSR/Georgia, philosopher and non-fiction writer
- Avksenty Tsagareli, 1857–1902, Russian E, dramatist
- Akaki Tsereteli, 1840–1915, Russian E, poet
- Mariam Tsiklauri, born 1960, Russian E, poet and children's author
- Iakob Tsurtaveli, fl. 5th century CE, non-fiction writer
- Anastasia Tumanishvili-Tsereteli, 1849–1932, Russian E/USSR, writer and educator
- David Turashvili, born 1966, USSR/Georgia, fiction writer

== V ==
- Vakhtang VI, 1675–1737, Georgia, non-fiction writer and poet
- Elene Virsaladze, 1911–1977, Russian E/USSR, non-fiction writer

== See also ==
- Republic of Georgia
- Culture of Georgia
