= List of Georgian women writers =

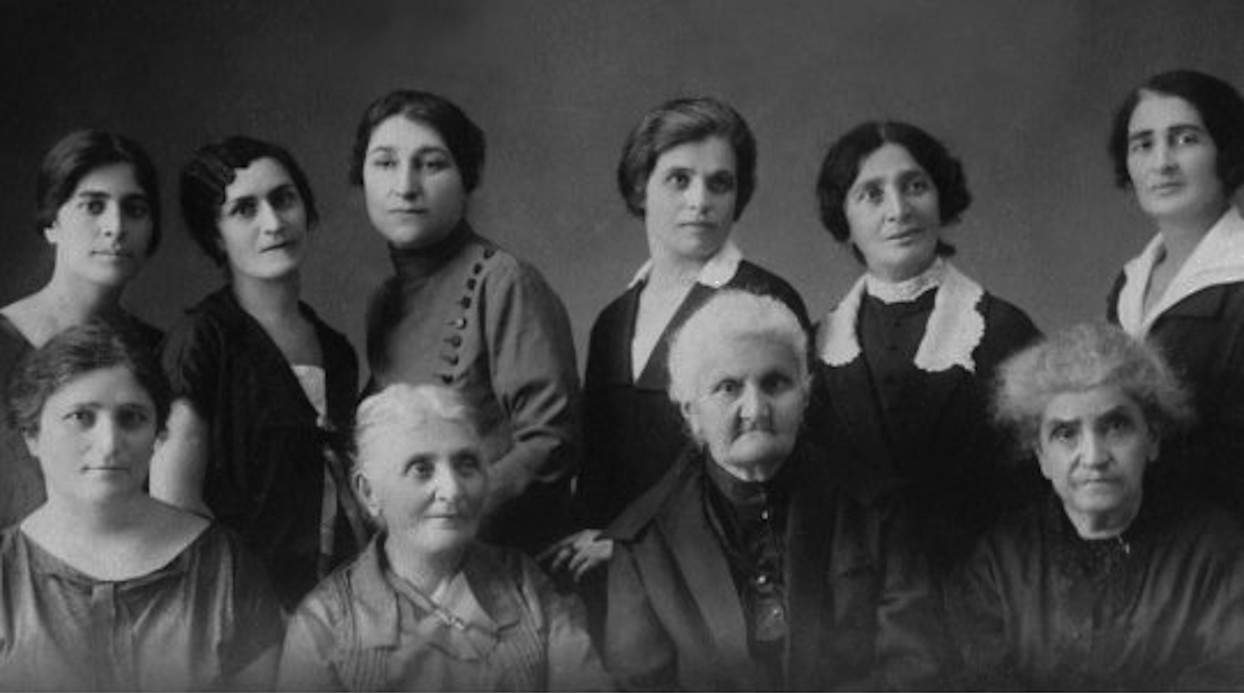
Group of Georgian women writers in the 1920s

This is a list of women writers who were born in the country of Georgia or whose writings are closely associated with that country.

== A ==
- Manana Antadze (born 1945), Georgian writer and translator

== D ==
- Aneta Dadeshkeliani (1872–1922), Georgian poet, educator and social reformer
- Nino Dadeshkeliani (1890–1931), Georgian writer, politician

== E ==
- Nana Ekvtimishvili (born 1978), Georgian writer and film director
- Anastasia Eristavi-Khoshtaria (1868–1951), Georgian novelist
- Dominika Eristavi (1864–1929), writer, translator

== G ==
- Ekaterine Gabashvili (1851–1938), Georgian feminist novelist
- Mariam Garikhuli (1883–1960), Georgian novelist, children's writer and actress
- Naira Gelashvili (born 1947), Georgian novelist, activist

== H ==
- Nino Haratischwili (born 1983), Georgian novelist, playwright

== J ==
- Barbare Jorjadze (1833–1895), Georgian writer and women's rights advocate

== K ==
- Ana Kalandadze (1924–2008), influential Georgian poet
- Babilina Khositashvili (1884–1973), Georgian poet, feminist
- Mariam Khutsurauli (born 1960), Georgian poet and short story writer
- Lali Kiknavelidze (born 1969), Georgian screenwriter and film director
- Ana Kordzaia-Samadashvili (born 1968), Georgian novelist and literary journalist
- Nestan Kvinikadze (born 1980), Georgian scriptwriter, dramatist

== M ==
- Manana Matiashvili (born 1978), Georgian poet, translator and journalist
- Tamta Melashvili (born 1979), Georgian novelist and feminist
- Ekaterine Melikishvili (1854–1928), Georgian translator and children's writer
- Kato Mikeladze (1878–1942), Georgian journalist, feminist and women's rights activist

== O ==
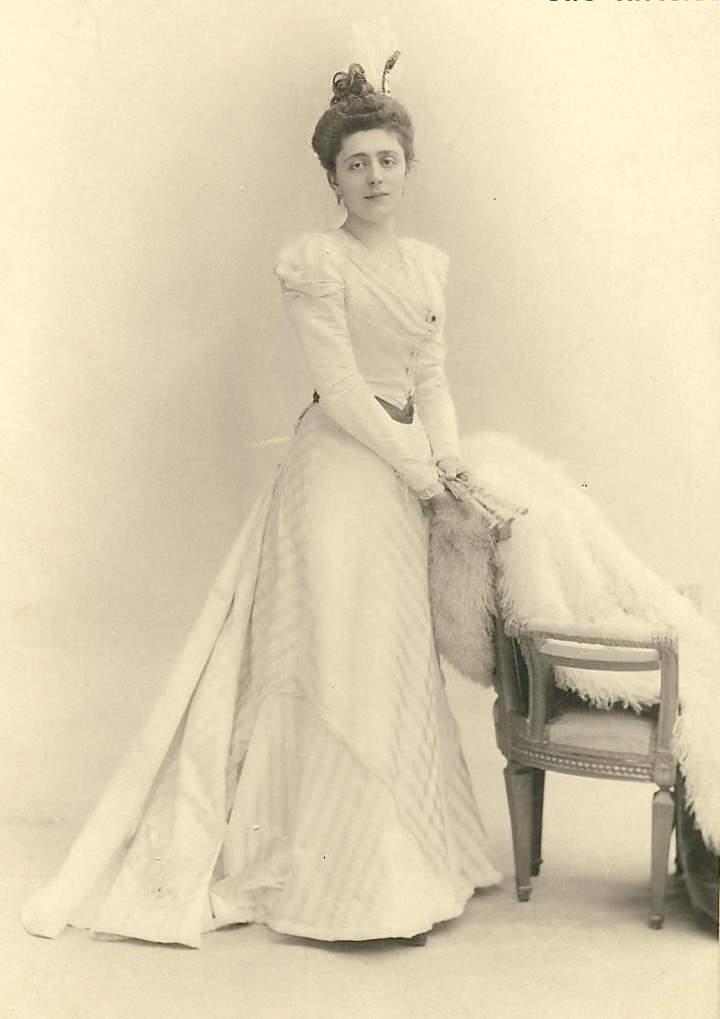
Elizabeth Orbeliani

- Elizabeth Orbeliani (1871–1942), Georgian poet
- Iza Orjonikidze (1938–2010), Georgian poet, politician

== P ==
- Tamri Pkhakadze (born 1957), Georgian novelist, children's writer

== S ==
- Nino Salia (1898–1992), Georgian émigré historian active in France
- Irma Shiolashvili (born 1974), Georgian poet, translator and journalist

== T ==
- Nino Tkeshelashvili (1874–1956), Georgian children's literature author and suffragist
- Ekaterine Togonidze (born 1981), Georgian journalist, novelist, activist
- Elena Topuridze (1922–2004), Georgian philosopher and non-fiction writer
- Mariam Tsiklauri (born 1960), Georgian poet, children's author and translator
- Anastasia Tumanishvili-Tsereteli (1849–1932), Georgian writer, educator and influential feminist

== V ==
- Elene Virsaladze (1911–1977), Georgian folklorist

== See also ==
- List of women writers
