= Nino Tkeshelashvili =

Georgian feminist, suffragist, writer (1874–1956)

- ნინო ტყეშელაშვილი
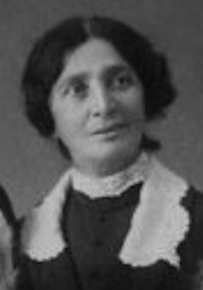
- Born: 1874; Tiflis (Tbilisi), Caucasus Viceroyalty, Russian Empire
- Died: 1956 (aged 81–82); Tbilisi, Georgian Soviet Socialist Republic
- Occupations: teacher, writer, women's rights activist
- Years active: 1903-1950s

Nino Tkeshelashvili (Georgian: ნინო ტყეშელაშვილი, 1874–1956) was a Georgian teacher, writer and women's rights activist. Born into an intellectual family in 1874, she completed the schooling available to her in Tiflis and then worked for a time in Didi Jikhaishi as a Russian language teacher. In 1903, she went to study dentistry in Moscow, where she became involved in the revolutionary student movement during the 1905 Russian Revolution. Returning to Tiflis the following year, she began to meet women writers and activists participating in the struggle for women's rights. She joined the Union of Georgian Women for Equal Rights in 1906, but three years later left the organization and co-founded the Caucasian Women's Society with a breakaway group of feminists.

As chair of the new society, Tkeshelashvili was active in the struggle for women's suffrage, in advancing the education of workers and the poor, working towards improved employment conditions and higher education for women, while addressing concerns in connection with women's health and sexuality. Around 1912, she began contributing to magazines and newspapers, addressing the issues facing women. With developments following the 1917 Russian Revolution, feminists hoped that the new Georgian Republic would heed their demands for civic and political equality. Instead, state policy created the Zhenotdel (Women's Bureau) in 1919, which limited women's free participation in society. Together with other feminists, Tkeshelashvili continued to press for equal participation until Stalin's state policies abolished the Zhenotdel and neutralized their efforts. She turned to writing, mainly writing for children in the Soviet era. When the Soviet Union dissolved, Georgian feminists rediscovered the history of Tkeshelashvili and other early associates.

== Early life ==
Nino Tkeshelashvili was born in 1874 in Tiflis (known after 1936 as Tbilisi) in the Caucasus Viceroyalty of the Russian Empire. Her father, whose family had been priests in the Georgian Orthodox Church, worked in agriculture and was an avid reader. Her mother was a close relative of the poet Akaki Tsereteli. From a young age, Tkeshelashvili enjoyed reading works from her father's library and was influenced by displaced revolutionaries who were frequent visitors in her parents' home. These included Ilia Bakhtadze, a journalist using the pen name Ilia Khoneli; the novelist Leo Kiacheli; and Archil Abashidze. She attended their discussions and dreamed of going to Russia to attend high school, like her brother. Though she completed the local school and earned a medal, she was unable to attend teacher training courses.

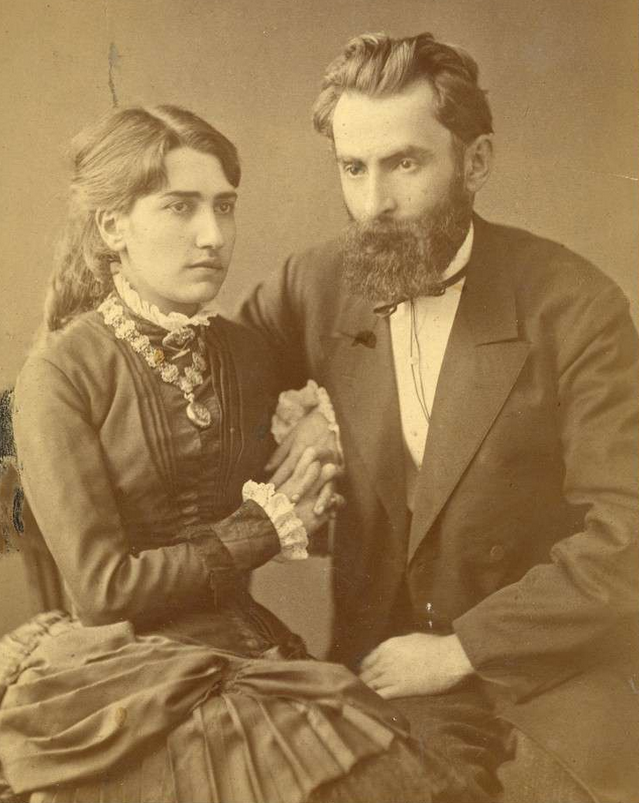
Olga Guramishvili-Nikoladze and Niko Nikoladze (1870-1880)

Through her parents, Tkeshelashvili met Niko Nikoladze, who was living in Didi Jikhaishi, in the Imereti region of western Georgia with his wife, Olga Guramishvili-Nikoladze (Georgian: ოლღა გურამიშვილი-ნიკოლაძე, 1855-1940) one of the first Georgian women to study abroad. Educated in Switzerland, Guramishvili returned to Georgia, where she was involved in pedagogy. She became a mentor to Tkeshelashvili, encouraging her to become a Russian-language teacher at the school she headed in Didi Jikhaishi. Besides teaching, she actively participated in literary evenings and read books from Nikoladze's library. In 1903, Tkeshelashvili went to Moscow, finally able to attend courses at dental school. She became involved in student radicalism and agitated with the intelligentsia for democratic reforms. At the end of the 1905 Russian Revolution, Tsar Nicholas conceded to terms that created the Duma, which had legislative oversight, while protecting freedom of conscience, speech, and assembly for the citizenship.

== Career ==
Returning to Tiflis in 1906, Tkeshelashvili found that the movement to expand civil and political rights had reached Georgia. She lived in a boarding house belonging to Ivane Machabeli. One of the other tenants, Mariam Demuria, was closely involved in public works projects. Demuria worked as a journalist and regularly gave lectures to the general public. She also ran a Sunday school to offer education to workers and hired Tkeshelashvili to teach Russian language courses. Through her work with Demuria, Tkeshelashvili gained a wider circle of friends and met other women writers, like Ekaterine Gabashvili, who was involved in the feminist movement. She joined the Union of Georgian Women for Equal Rights, which began planning a conference for all Russian women to be held in Tiflis in 1908. Tkeshelashvili gave the opening address, calling on women to work for their freedom and cultural development.

After the conference, recognizing that they wanted a more international approach than the Union of Georgian Women offered, a group led by Tkeshelashvili parted in 1909 to form the Caucasian Women's Society (Georgian: კავკასიელ ქალთა საზოგადოება) (CWS). Among the 135 founding members were Gabashvili, Babilina Khositashvili, Nino Kipiani and Kato Mikeladze. Besides supporting women's suffrage, the CWS established clubs for working women in which they taught literacy and sewing. Tkeshelashvili hosted literary evenings where speakers presented talks on the Russian classics. The CWS also mounted a strong campaign to uphold women's "moral standards", labeling prostitution a "social evil". They invited women to attend debates that discussed social issues such as prostitution, education for the poor, employment conditions, higher education, and women's health and sexuality, among other topics.

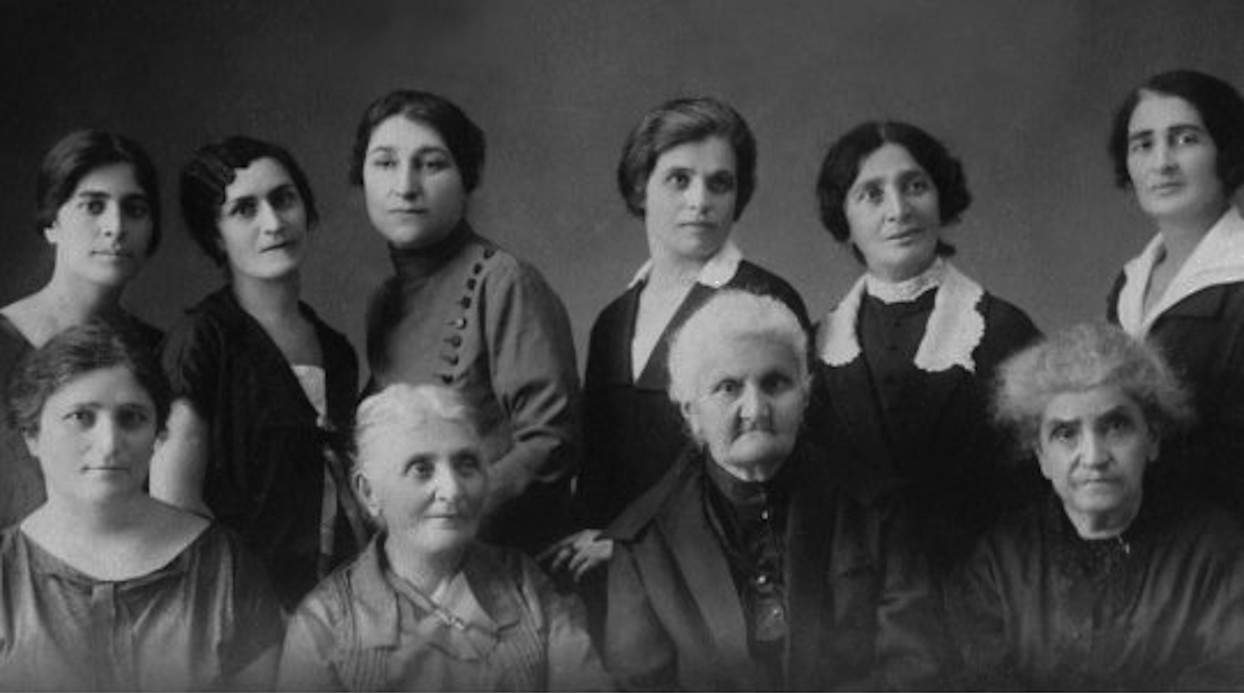
Georgian women writers (1925-1928), Tkeshelashvili is on the back row 2nd from the right

Around 1912, Tkeshelashvili began publishing translations and original works in კვალი (Trace) and the children's magazine ჯეჯილი (Jejili, meaning "wheat shoots"), founded by Anastasia Tumanishvili-Tsereteli. That year, she also joined the editorial staff of ნაკადული (The Stream), where she met writers Nino Nakashidze and Akaki Tsereteli. Writing under the pseudonym სუფრაჟისტკას (Suffragist), Tkeshelashvili published works urging the political and civic equality of women. In 1914, during World War I, the Caucasian Women's Society began operating free canteens and sewing clothes for soldiers. Tkeshelashvili also increased her literary output, writing for such journals as the Reference Sheet, The Rock, Theater and Life, and the Voice of Georgian Woman among others. One of her articles from the period, ქალი რევოლუციონურ კულტურის ფრონტზე (A Woman at the Front of Revolutionary Culture), evaluated women's economic dependence on men and confinement by social roles which tied them to the family. She postulated that Lenin's revolutionary ideas would free women from laws that were discriminatory.

Tkeshelashvili took courses at the Kutaisi Women's Gymnasium and between 1917 and 1918 was active in the Georgian independence movement, following the collapse of the Russian Empire at the end of the 1917 Revolution. When the Democratic Republic of Georgia was being formed, she participated in the district elections for the Social Democratic Party of Georgia, held at the Gymnasium, and was shocked that out of 20 candidates there was only one woman. When she lamented the numbers to the audience, the party chair asked her to name qualified candidates. Tkeshelashvili gave him five names, but none were added to the ballot. She and other members of the Caucasian Women's Society cut all ties with the Social Democratic Party, recognizing that there was no genuine interest in their goals. Instead, the Party began promoting their own policies and became increasingly hostile to grassroots initiatives. In 1919 the Zhenotdel was founded which enacted government policies from the top down ignoring the real needs of women.

The feminists continued to fight vigorously for their rights, meeting in private homes to discuss how best to continue their struggle. At one such meeting, Tkeshelashvili presented a story, მგალობელი ჩიტების ზეიმი (Mourning Birds Celebration) in which other women acted out the parts. It was an allegory of the feminist struggle and after its presentation, the other women dubbed her the მერცხალას (the Swallow), which she took on as a new pseudonym. In 1924, she wrote and participated in the public mock-trial, ქრისტინეს გასამართლება (Judging Christine) in which she protested the remnants of capitalism that continued to victimize women. The performance was very popular and was presented at theaters and workers' palaces.

In 1930, Stalin abolished the Zhenotdel, effectively neutralizing the women's movement. Officially, a woman's primary obligation became motherhood and domestic work, a secondary function being social productivity. Feminists transformed from seeking equality to writing children's fiction, as it was an approved activity for women. From that time, Tkeshelashvili wrote children's short stories and fables, which were run as features in Georgian magazines and newspapers. Her best works were ხუხულები (Hooks) and ასლამაზა (Alamosa) but other well-known pieces included სპილო და მტაცებლები (Elephant and Predators), მგალობელი ჩიტები (Mourning Birds), and ვირი (Donkey).

== Death and legacy ==
Tkeshelashvili died in her home town in 1956. Like most feminists of the times, her activism for women's rights was forgotten in the Soviet era. Her 1990 biography listed her as a writer but since the dissolution of the Soviet Union, Georgian feminists have been exploring their past and reclaiming the stories of early contributors like Tkeshelashvili.

== See also ==
- List of Georgian women writers
