= List of suffragists from Georgia (country) =

This is a list of Georgia suffragists who were born in Georgia or whose lives and works are closely associated with that country.

== Suffragists ==
- Ekaterine Gabashvili (1861–1938) – writer, feminist and suffragist
- Babilina Khositashvili (1884–1973) – poet, labour rights activist and suffragist
- Kato Mikeladze (1878–1942) – suffragist who established the Inter-Partial League of Women
- Nino Tkeshelashvili (1874–1956) – feminist, suffragist, writer
