= Women's Circle =

The Women’s Circle was a women's organization active in Georgia during the Russian era, founded in 1872.

It was founded by a group of women who were forced to study in Switzerland because no university open to them in the Russian Empire. Among its co-founders were Anastasia Tumanishvili-Tsereteli, Ekaterine Melikishvili-Meskhi, Olga Guramishvili-Nikoladze, Ekaterine Gabashvili and Elene Kipiani. It was a literary society for women, which translated and discussed foreign literature. Political organizations were not permitted in the Russian Empire before 1905, but the society was permitted because it was a literary society. In practice, however, the society functioned as a women's organization since it gave women the opportunity to gather and discuss women's issues and reforms in women's rights. The Women’s Circle spread across Georgia through local branches. It is regarded as the starting point of the organized women's movement in Georgia.

In 1905, political organizations was officially permitted in the Russian Empire, and the Women’s Circle was succeeded by a number of openly political women's organizations, such as “Education” (1908), “Georgian Women’s Charity Organization”, “Commission of Tbilisi Women’s Circle”, “Georgian Women’s Society”, “School for Poor Girls”, “Society of Education”, “Society of Knowledge” and “Georgian Unity of Equality for Women” and finally the suffrage organization Inter-Partial League of Women of Kato Mikeladze (1916).
