= Ekaterine Melikishvili =

Ekaterine (Keke) Melikishvili, married name Meskhi (Georgian: ეკატერინე (კეკე) მელიქიშვილი-მესხი; 1854–1928), was a Georgian writer, translator and feminist.

Brought up in a well-to-do home in Tbilisi, after matriculating from a Swiss high school, she became one of the first Georgian women to attend university in Switzerland, studying medicine in Zürich. While there, she became fluent in German and French, followed the innovative developments of the times as well as the evolving situation in Georgia. She was one of several women writers to join the Georgian Ugheli association, together with Kato Mikeladze, Olga Guramishvili, Pelagia Natsvlishvili and Bogumila Zeminskaya.

Melikishvili was the first dean of Odessa University where she created courses for women. A member of the Georgian women writers' circle, she translated children's literature as well as works of social importance, including American Women of the 18th Century. She was a major contributor to journals, including Droeba, founded by her brother Stepane Melikishvili. She headed a family printing concern, was a co-founder of the Skhivi publishing house and founded the Ganatleba (education) association.

== See also ==
- List of Georgian women writers
- Women’s Circle
