= Tkeshelashvili =

Tkeshelashvili (Georgian: ტყეშელაშვილი) is the Georgian surname, which may refer to:

- David Tkeshelashvili, Georgian politician
- Eka Tkeshelashvili, Georgian politician
- Nino Tkeshelashvili, Georgian writer and feminist
- Sofiko Tkeshelashvili, Georgian chess player, woman grandmaster
- Zaza Tkeshelashvili, Georgian Freestyle wrestler
