= List of suffragists from Georgia =

List of Georgia suffragists may refer to:

- List of suffragists from Georgia (country)
- List of suffragists from Georgia (U.S. state)
