= Melashvili =

Melashvili (Georgian: მელაშვილი) is a Georgian surname. Notable people with the surname include:

- George Melashvili (born 1994), Georgian public figure, scholar of political sciences
- Tamta Melashvili (born 1979), Georgian writer and a feminist activist
