= Giorgi Leonidze State Museum of Literature =

- საქართველოს გიორგი ლეონიძის სახელობის ქართული ლიტერატურის სახელმწიფო მუზეუმი
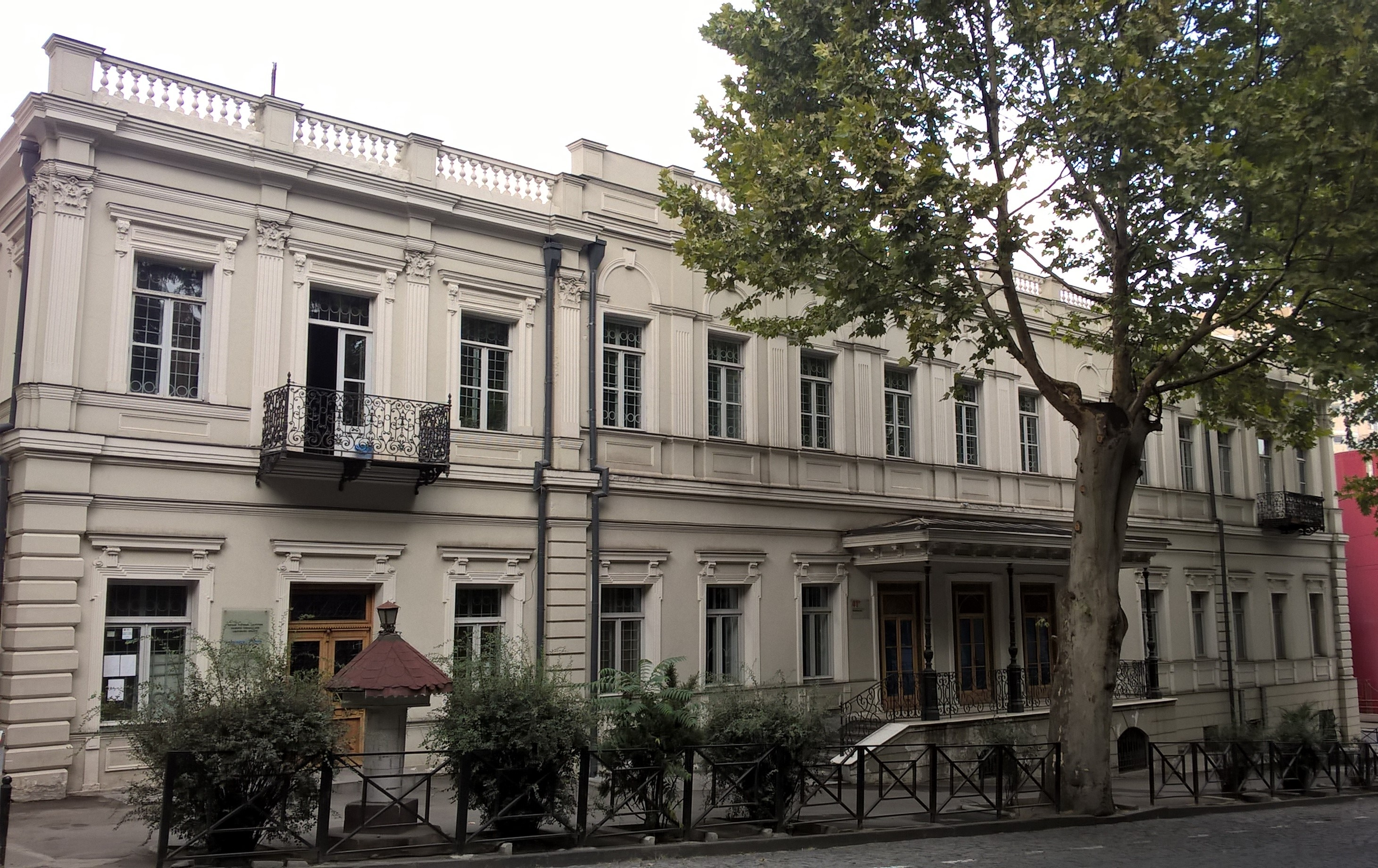
- Location: Georgia
- Coordinates: 41°41′58″N 44°47′56″E
- Website: literaturemuseum.com
- Location of Giorgi Leonidze State Museum of Literature

Giorgi Leonidze State Museum of Literature, Georgia (Georgian: საქართველოს გიორგი ლეონიძის სახელობის მუზეუმი) was founded in 1930 upon the initiative of David Arsenishvili, a legendary museum-founder, who also was the creator of Tbilisi Theater Museum, and later the famous Andrej Rublow museum in Moscow.

The greatest supporter for this initiative was Georgian poet Titsian Tabidze, who, together with the group of symbolist writers – the Blue Horns (Georgian: Tsisferyantselebi / ცისფერყანწელები ) – advocated the creation of a literature museum since 1919. Tabidze, together with Ivan Enikolofow, was also the first chair of the museum.

== History ==
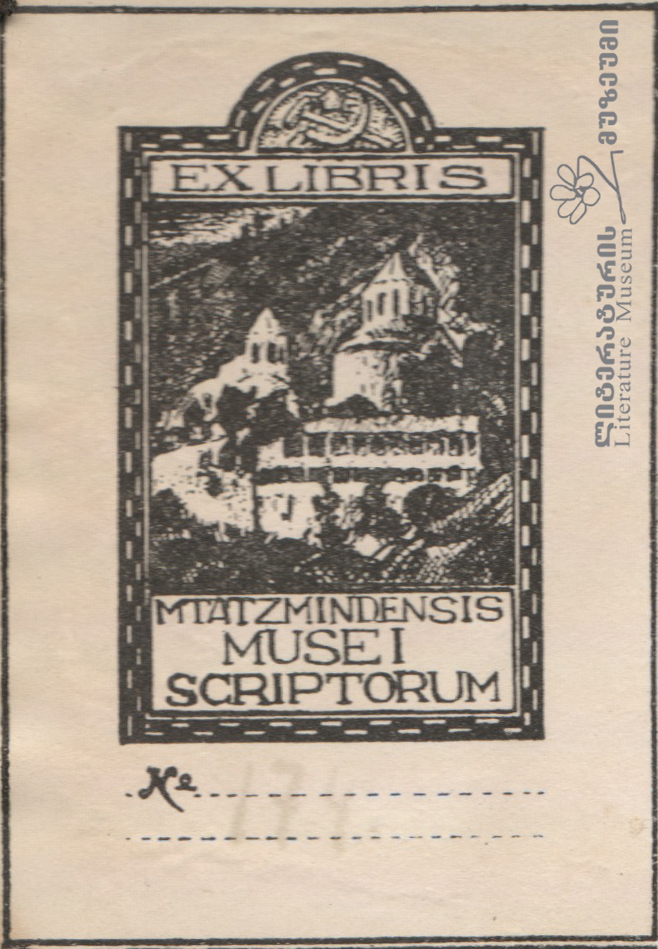

The first building of the museum was located on Mtatsminda hills in Tbilisi, home to the pantheon of Georgia’s most prominent writers and poets, Mtatsminda Pantheon; initially, the museum was created to guard the documents and manuscripts of those famous personalities. Hence the first name of the institution was Museum of Mtatsminda Writers. Later on however, in 1938, when the collection was complemented by different types of documents from the 19th and 20th centuries of Georgian literature, the museum moved to the new place - at Giorgi Tchanturia Street 8 - the historic building it occupies until present, (built in the late 19th century, previously a residence of the deputy Viceroy in the Caucasus) and became the State Literature Museum. Since 1967, it bears the name of Giorgi Leonidze, co-founder of the museum, who, for 22 years (1931–1953) was also its director.

== Archives ==
Functioning as a literature archive Literature Museum comprises the richest collection of the Georgian literature, mainly of last two centuries (almost 130 000 manuscripts, about 27 000 photos, more than 2 000 paintings and graphics, etc.). Belongings of most prominent Georgian writers, such as Ilia Chavchavadze, Akaki Tsereteli, Vazha-Pshavela, Ivane Machabeli, Alexandre Kazbegi, Galaktion Tabidze, Titsian Tabidze and many others, are kept here. There are also works of the Nobel Prize for Literature winner, the Russian writer Boris Pasternak and the German writer Arthur Leist, who lived in Georgia.

During 1940–1952, 1982–2005 years Literature Museum was publishing series of research books of the Georgian Literature "Chronicle of Literature" (In Georgian: 'Literaturis Matiane" / "ლიტერატურის მატიანე" ).

== Today's activities ==
The museum has no permanent exhibition, but it hosts different short and long-term exhibitions, performances and movie screenings. It holds multiple events per year, and ongoing and future events are listed on its Facebook page. Publishing is one of the most important activities of the Museum even today.

The Museum and its exhibitions are usually open Tuesday to Saturday, 10:00 AM to 6:00 PM.

== Directors of the museum ==
1. Giorgi Leonidze 1931–1953
2. Vaso Egnatashvili 1953–1956
3. Vano Kakabadze 1956–1976
4. Iza Orjonikidze 1976–1982
5. Giorgi Natroshvili 1982–1988
6. Revaz Tvaradze - 1988
7. Iza Orjonikidze 1989–1990
8. Guram Sharadze 1991, 5–27 January
9. Iza Orjonikidze 1991–2010, February
10. Lasha Bakradze from March 2010 to October 2024
