= Anastasia Eristavi-Khoshtaria =

Georgian writer (1868–1951)

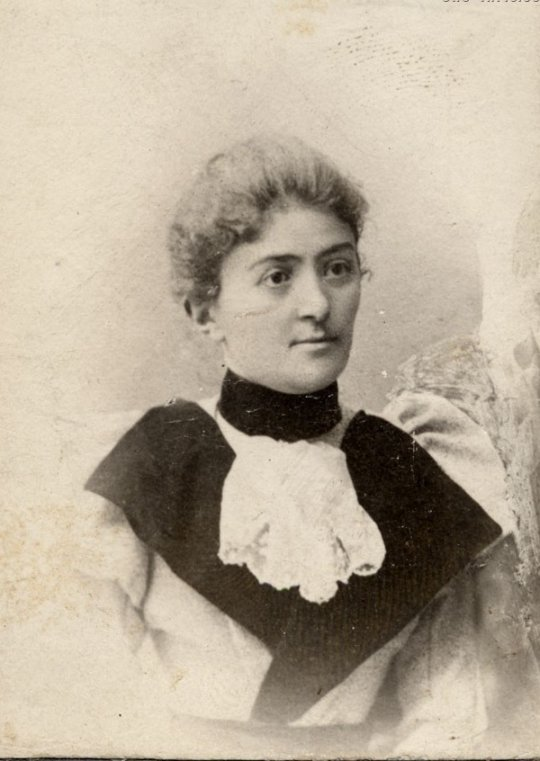
- Portrait of Anastasia Eristavi-Khoshtaria
- Native name: ანასტასია ერისთავი-ხოშტარია
- Born: 3 February 1868 Gori, Tiflis Governorate, Russian Empire
- Died: 1 May 1951 (aged 83) Tbilisi, Georgian SSR, Soviet Union
- Occupation: Novelist, teacher, public figure
- Language: Georgian
- Genre: Realism, social novel, romanticism
- Notable works: On the Slippery Path (1897); The Wheel of Fate (1901)
- Spouse: Dutu Megreli (Dimitri Khoshtaria)

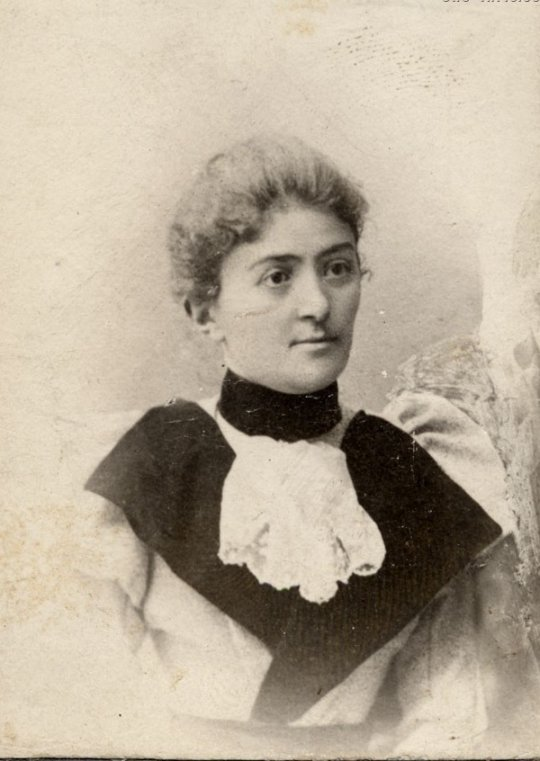
Anastasia Eristavi-Khoshtaria

Anastasia Eristavi-Khoshtaria (Georgian: ანასტასია ერისთავი-ხოშტარია; February 3, 1868 – May 1, 1951) was a Georgian woman novelist.

== Biography ==
She was born into an aristocratic family in Gori, Georgia, then part of Imperial Russia. Eristavi-Khoshtaria began as a teacher in her birthplace, Gori, where she founded a free school for peasant children and later established a women's organization Mandilosani (1913-4). She debuted in 1885 when her translation of an Ossetic legend ბესო (Beso) was published. In the 1890s she was encouraged by the popular Georgian writer Akaki Tsereteli to move to Tbilisi to continue her work on original writings. Her first novels, მოლიპულ გზაზე (On the Slippery Path, 1897) and ბედის ტრიალი (The Wheel of Fate, 1901), enjoyed recognizable success. Being the first Georgian female writer who set her work from a feminine view and direct it at educated adults, Eristavi-Khoshtaria's novels and stories follow one pattern: they trace the career of a Georgian noblewoman, thrown into turmoil of the collapse of the old economic and moral orders in the mid-19th century, defending her ideals of free work and truthful love against a corrupt background and clay-footed heroes. After the Soviet invasion of 1921, she withdrew from literary and public activities and wrote little, except ideologically corrective introductions to reprints of her own works .

Anastasia Eristavi-Khoshtaria was married to Dutu Megreli (Dimitri Khoshtaria) (1867-1938), an author of popular patriotic poems and children's stories.

== See also ==
- List of Georgian women writers
