= Alexey Tsereteli =

Alexey Akakiyevich Tsereteli
- Georgian prince
- Born: 1864; Saint Petersburg, Russian Empire
- Died: 1942 (aged 77–78); Paris, France
- House: Tsereteli
- Father: Akaki Tsereteli (1840–1915)
- Mother: Natalia Petrovna Bazilevskaya
- Religion: Orthodox Christianity

Alexey Tsereteli (Russian: Алексей Акакиевич Церетели; 1864, Saint Petersburg, Russian Empire – 1942, Paris, France) was a Georgian prince and a Russian opera entrepreneur.

Alexey was born in St. Petersburg and received the same education as all the Russian aristocracy, and did not even know the Georgian language. He grew up a man of Russian culture. His father was Akaki Tsereteli (1840–1915), a Georgian prince, a prominent Georgian poet, and a national liberation movement figure. His mother was Natalia Petrovna Bazilevskaya (ru: Наталия Петровна Базилевская).

From childhood, he liked music and especially opera. He received the profession of engineer, but a passion for opera has won, and he decided to open an opera troupe. In 1896/1897, Alexey Tsereteli opened an opera enterprise in Kharkov. A theater critic once noted the successful staging of the new company. Very soon, he continued to work in St. Petersburg and created a New Opera (ru: «Новая опера») and, despite competition from the Mariinsky Theatre, his productions are popular. Worked there not only with well-known Russian singers, but also with famous European singers. In 1905, Titta Ruffo came to participate in several performances. In 1907/08, A. Tsereteli organized tours of Feodor Chaliapin in America.

In 1917, A. Tsereteli left Russia. In 1921, he began to create an opera-ballet troupe in Barcelona, then in Paris. In his company, many famous Russian singer-emigrants worked. In 1926, he organized a performance of The Legend of the Invisible City of Kitezh and the Maiden Fevroniya at the Opéra national de Paris.

In 1929, he joined his company with a troupe of Russian opera, including Maria Nikolaevna Kuznetsova and her husband Alfred Massenet (Jules Massenet's nephew). The new company was called the Russian Opera in Paris. The conductors, directors, painters, singers, and ballet artists who worked there included Emil Cooper, Nikolai Evreinov, Alexander Sanin, Konstantin Korovin, Ivan Bilibin, Mstislav Dobuzhinsky; Michel Fokine, Bronislava Nijinska, opera singers: Feodor Chaliapin, Dmitriy Smirnov, Yelena Sadoven, Marya Davydova, Marianna Cherkasskaya, Natalia Ermolenko-Yuzhina, George Pozemkovskiy, Yakov Gorsky, Kapiton Zaporojets (Capiton D. Zaporozhetz, ru: Капитон Запорожец), Nina Koshetz, etc. Alexey Tsereteli invited Colonel W. de Basil’s ballet troupe. The success was enormous.

The troupe was invited to different countries. In one of the productions of the opera Prince Igor in London in 1933, Feodor Chaliapin played two roles at once: Galitsky and Konchak (Russian sources call another date of this representation: June 5, 1931, Lyceum Theatre, London).

However, the owners of the company quarreled and filed their claims in court, causing Private Company to eventually disband. After this happened, Tsereteli tried to work with other partners, but failed to rebuild his success.

Before his death, Tsereteli bequeathed all the props of his troupe to the "theater of the future of a free Georgia". But his will was not recognized as valid, and the property went to auction.

Prince Alexei Akakiyevich Tsereteli died in 1942 in German-occupied Paris.
