= Elizabeth Orbeliani =

Georgian poet, translator, and philanthropist

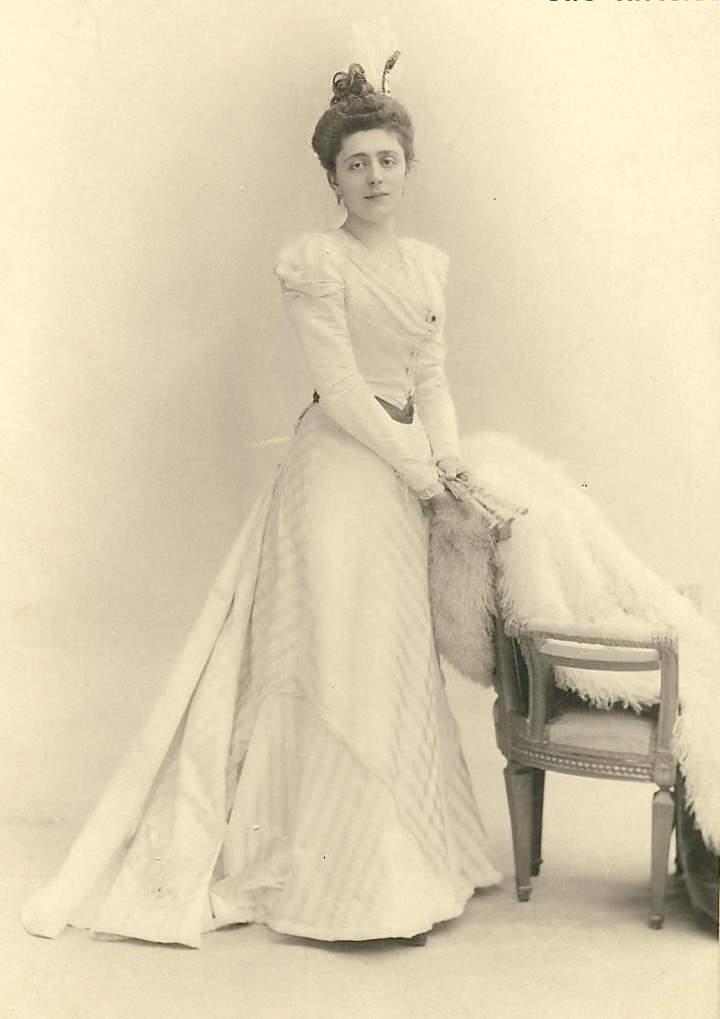
Elizabeth Orbeliani

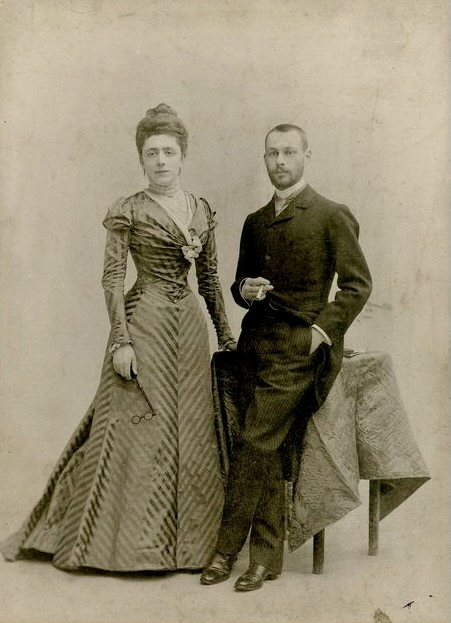
Elizabeth with her husband Makar.

Princess Elizabeth Orbeliani (Georgian: ელისაბედ ორბელიანი; 1871 — 1942) was a Georgian poet, translator, and philanthropist, who worked on improving the rights of women. She was the first ever woman to teach at the Tbilisi State University, of which she is considered a co-founder.

Orbeliani was once the lady of the Orbeliani Palace, which currently serves as home to the President of Georgia. To this day, there is a room in the palace dedicated to her memory and it is used to receive foreign dignitaries.

== Biography ==
Elizabeth Bagrationi was born on 25 November 1871, in Tiflis, present-day Georgia, which was then part of the Russian Empire. She belonged to the Georgian nobility, descended from Heraclius II of Georgia on her father's side and the family of Chavchavadze on her mother's side. Elizabeth married a fellow Georgian aristocrat, Makar Ivanes dze Orbeliani (1873-1924) the eldest son of Ivane Jambakurian-Orbeliani, and was known by her husband's surname.

In 1919–1920, Orbeliani served as editor of French and English-language newspapers of the Democratic Republic of Georgia: "Free Georgia" and "Republic of Georgia" (both in French) and "Herald of Georgia" (in English). She produced a French translation of the medieval Georgian poem The Knight in the Panther's Skin, as well as works of classical Georgian authors, such as Alexander Chavchavadze, Grigol Orbeliani, Nikoloz Baratashvili, Vazha Pshavela, and others.

Starting in 1918, at the invitation of the Council of Georgian University Professors, Orbeliani taught French and English courses at what is now the Tbilisi State University (TSU). The foundation of that university by independent Georgia was a longstanding dream of Georgian intellectuals who up to that point were thwarted by the Imperial Russian authorities. Orbeliani was the first woman to teach at TSU and is recognized as one of the founders of the university, which maintains an award in her name.

Orbeliani died in 1942 and was interred at Vake Cemetery in Tbilisi, Georgia.

== Bibliography ==
- ლილუაშვილი მ., საქართველოს დემოკრატიული რესპუბლიკა (1918–1921) : ენციკლოპედია-ლექსიკონი, თბ.: უნივერსიტეტის გამომცემლობა, 2018. — გვ. 308.

== See also ==
- Anastasia Tumanishvili-Tsereteli
- Ekaterine Gabashvili
- Olga Guramishvili-Nikoladze
- Dominika Eristavi
