= Teona Kumsiashvili =

Teona Qumsiashvili

Teona Kumsiashvili (Georgian: თეონა ქუმსიაშვილი; 27 January 1984 in Sioni urban village, Georgia – 22 July 2010 in Mutso ravine, Georgia) was a Georgian poet, singer, and composer of Pshav-Khevsureti region's songs.

She was called a "Mountain nightingale" because of her unique voice and original manner of singing.

== Biography ==
She was born on Saint Nino's day (27 January 1984) in Sioni, Eastern Georgia.

During 2007-2010, Teona participated in different folk festivals in Georgia, such as "Khevsurian evening" (ხევსურული საღამო) and "АrtGene"(არტ-გენი).

Songs by Teona Kumsiashvili Rosa canina and On motive of Pshavi which have been written on Mariam Khutsurauli's verses became hits on social networks.

In the summer of 2007, she performed with the "Shavnabada Ensemble" at Inegol's folk festival in Turkey.

On 22 July 2010, Teona with her two sons, sister and a family of their friends died due to a road accident in the high mountains of the Khevsureti region. The car fell into the waters of a cold mountain river. Seven people (children among them) died in the car crash. Teona's husband and brother survived.

== Discography ==
Teona recorded only 2 albums composed of folk songs as well as her own ones:

- 2005 - "პირიმზე"
- 2009 - "მარტო სიმღერით გითხარ ამდენი სიყვარული"

== Family ==
Her husband was the famous Khevsurian poet Gela Daiauri. The couple had two sons: Demetre (born 8 July 2008) and Jardji (born 30 September 2009).
