= Mariam Garikhuli =

Georgian writer and actress (1883–1960)

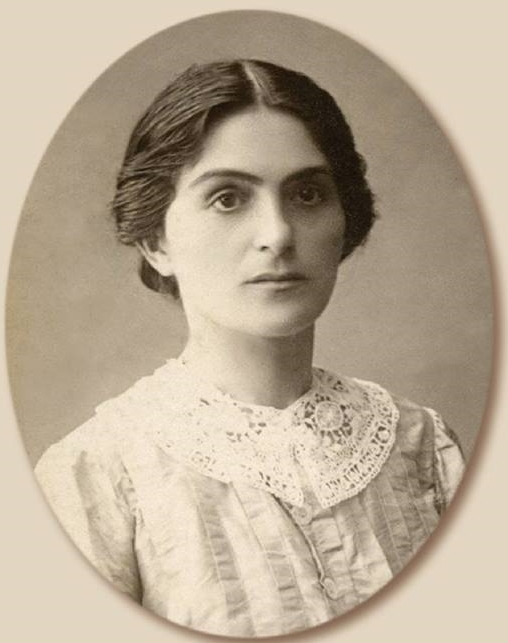
Mariam Garikhuli

Mariam Garikhuli (Georgian: მარიამ თათეშვილი), official name Mariam Lukas Tatishvili-Ratiani (Georgian: მარიამ ლუკას ასული თათეიშვილი-რატიანისა; 20 March 1883–9 February 1960) was a Georgian writer and actress. As an author, under the pseudonym Garikhuli (meaning "ostracized" or "outcast"), she contributed to magazines and newspapers, publishing her first short story "ცხოვრების მსხვერპლი" (Victim of Life) in 1905. Assisted by Lado Meskhishvili, she adapted works by Ilia Chavchavadze and Akaki Tsereteli for the theatre. In addition to contributing to various children's publications, she is remembered for her novel ანარეკლი (Reflection) written in the 1930s. As an actress, she performed at theatres in Kutaisi (1902–1904), Gori (1920–1926) and at the Tbilisi Film Studio (1927–1941).
