= Natalia Ermolenko-Yuzhina =

Russian opera singer (1881–1937)

Natalia Stepanovna Ermolenko-Yuzhina (Russian: Наталия Степановна Ермоленко-Южина; 1881, Kiev, Russian Empire – 1937, Paris, France) was a Russian opera singer (soprano).

== Early years ==
Ermolenko-Yuzhina was born, and received her first lessons, in Kiev. She continued her studies in St. Petersburg, then in Paris and Italy.

== Career ==
Ermolenko-Yuzhina made her debut in Kiev as Lisa in The Queen of Spades in 1900. She then joined Aleksey Tsereteli's opera company in St. Petersburg, before becoming a soloist at the Mariinsky Theatre in 1901. She remained at the Mariinsky until 1905, when she joined the Bolshoi Theatre, performing there until 1906. While performing at the Bolshoi, she met her husband, opera singer David Khristoforovich Yuzhin.

Ermolenko-Yuzhina and her husband left the Bolshoi in 1908, and joined Sergei Zimin's opera company, remaining for two seasons. In 1910, Ermolenko-Yuzhina returned to the Mariinsky, where she performed from 1910 to 1913, and again, from 1915 to 1920. She performed at the Bolshoi in 1913, 1916, and 1919, and she also with Sergei Diaghilev’s enterprise, and in various European opera houses, before the First World War. For her performance in the Marina Mnizhek (opera Boris Godunov; 1908, Paris, Opéra national de Paris) she was presented with the Legion of Honour.

Ermolenko-Yuzhina was considered to be the leading Russian lyric-dramatic soprano of her day, with a repertoire of more than thirty roles, including Brunnhilde, Norma, Violette and Carmen.

== Exile ==
Her husband, David Yuzhin, died on December 28, 1923, after a lengthy illness. A few months later, in early 1924, Ermolenko-Yuzhina fled the Soviet Union and settled in Paris. During the working troupe of Russian opera of Aleksey Tsereteli. She appeared for a time with Aleksey Tsereteli's opera company and at the Opéra national de Paris; she also gave private concerts. She faded from the public eye and little is known about her final years in exile.

There is some dispute over the date of her death. Some sources claim that Ermolenko-Yuzhina died in Paris in 1937; other sources claim that she died in Paris in 1948.

== Real name ==
Ermolenko-Yuzhina's was born Natalia Stepanovna Plugovskaya (Плуговская), she later adopted Ermolenko as her stage name, and after her marriage to opera singer David Yuzhin (his real last name was Pisitko / ru: Писитько), combined both pseudonyms and became Ermolenko-Yuzhina.
