= Anastasia Tumanishvili-Tsereteli =

Georgian writer and educator (1849–1932)

Anastasia Tumanishvili-Tsereteli

Anastasia Tumanishvili-Tsereteli (Georgian: ანასტასია თუმანიშვილ-წერეთელი; 6 September [O.S. 25 August] 1849 – 7 February 1932) was a Georgian writer and educator who made important contributions to cultural developments in her country, particularly those of women.

She first founded the Georgian Women's Society (1872), whose membership consisted principally of Georgian writers. Under her leadership, in 1884 a school and an orphanage were established in Kheltubani near Gori; two years later she founded and chaired the Georgian Society of Women Teachers. In 1890, she co-founded and became editor of the successful children's magazine Jejili and together with her husband, went on to publish and edit the newspaper Kvali (1893–1904). Finally, in 1908 she established the influential educational association Ganatleba.

== Biography ==
Born on 25 August 1842, Anastasia Tumanishili was educated at a boarding school in Tbilisi and at the Transcaucasia Women's Institution. The daughter of Michael Tumanishvili, from an early age she became acquainted with the public and literary figures who visited her home. In 1876, she visited Switzerland where she learnt about methods for educating small children.

In 1872, she brought together writers including Keke Meshki, Elene Kipiani and Ekaterine Gabashvili in her Women's Society, where they published writings and translations in support of Georgia's evolving culture and patriotism.

== See also ==
- Elizabeth Orbeliani
- Ekaterine Gabashvili
- Olga Guramishvili-Nikoladze
- Dominika Eristavi
- List of Georgian women writers
