= Aneta Dadeshkeliani =

Georgian poet, educator and social reformer

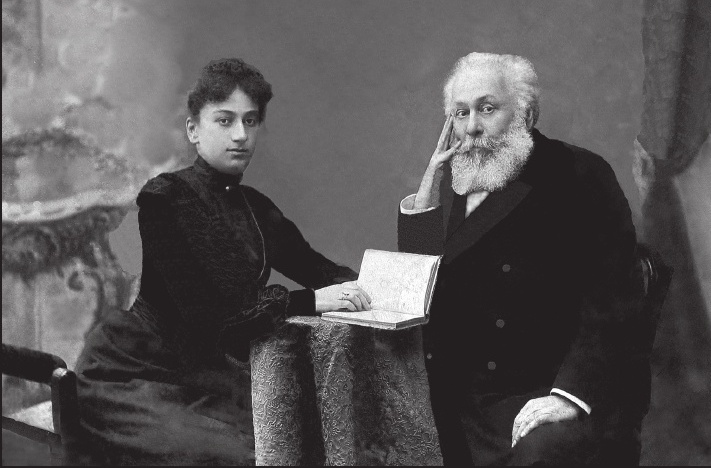
Aneta Dadeshkeliani with her uncle Akaki Tsereteli

Aneta Dadiani-Dadeshkeliani (Georgian: ანეტა დადეშქელიანი; 1872–1922) was a Georgian poet, educator and social reformer. Her poetry was published in contemporary journals. Together with her husband, Jansug Dadeshkeliani, she strove to improve the lives of the peasantry. She was an active member of the Society for the Spreading of Literacy among Georgians.

== Biography ==
Born in 1872 in Jvari, Aneta Dadiani lost her mother when still very young. As a result, she was brought up by her uncle, the poet Akaki Tsereteli. In 1888, she married Jansug Dadeshkelini, from the princely House of Dadeshkeliani. Their two sons died in World War I.

Following in her uncle's footsteps, she wrote poems which were published in journals and newspapers. Playing an active role in social work, she promoted literacy among the peasantry of Samegrelo and Svaneti while participating in the Society for the Spreading of Literacy among Georgians.

After supporting the school in Etseri founded by Tatarkan Dadeshkeliani, her brother-in-law, she opened a small primary school in her own residence in Jvani, strongly promoting the Georgian language.

Aneta Dadiani-Dadeshkeliani died in 1922, bequeathing part of her estate to the Society for the Spreading of Literacy among Georgians.

== See also ==
- List of Georgian women writers
