= Iza Orjonikidze =

Georgian poet and politician

Iza Orjonikidze (Georgian: იზა ორჯონიკიძე; 21 November 1938 – 9 February 2010) was a Georgian poet and literary scholar who was also member of the Parliament of Georgia from 1992 to 1995.

Born in Tbilisi, the capital of then-Soviet Georgia, Orjonikidze graduated from the Moscow State University with a degree in philology in 1965. In 1976, she was appointed the director of Leonidze Museum of Georgian Literature, a position she held until 1982 and again from 1989 to 1990 and from 1991 to 2010. In 1989, Orjonikidze was a member of the special commission investigating the actions of the Soviet military against the pro-independence demonstrations in Georgia on 9 April 1989. After Georgia’s independence from the Soviet Union, she was elected to the parliament for Tbilisi's Saburtalo district from 1992 to 1995.

Orjonikidze published several collections of her Poetry and Prose. She received several literary and civic awards, including the Shota Rustaveli State Prize and the Order of Honour. She died after a long illness in Tbilisi at the age of 71.

== See also ==
- List of Georgian women writers
