= Pelagia Natsvlishvili =

Georgian physician

Pelagia Natsvlishvili (1853-1878) was a Georgian physician.

She became the first female physician in Georgia in 1878.
