= Nino Dadeshkeliani =

Nino Dadeshkeliani Princess
- Born: 17 June 1890
- Died: 1931 (aged 40–41)
- Relatives: Alexander Dadeshkeliani (father); Babilina Eristavi (mother)
- Military career
- Allegiance: Georgia
- Branch: Russian Army
- Unit: 4th Tartar Regiment
- Conflicts: World War I
- Other work: Author

Princess Nino Dadeshkeliani (June 17, 1890 – 1931), was a Georgian noblewoman and an author.

== Early life ==
Nino was the daughter of a General, Prince Alexander Dadeshkeliani (1862-1910) and his wife, Princess Babilina Eristavi (d. 1924). Her father, an inspector of State Forests, was assassinated in 1909.

== Career ==
=== World War I ===
During World War I, Dadeshkeliani joined the Russian Army, and served with the 4th Tartar Regiment. She drove an ambulance on the Austrian front before being wounded in 1916.

=== Post-WWI ===
After the war, Dadeshkeliani lived in Georgia and served in the Constituent Assembly of the Democratic Republic of Georgia. However, when Soviet Russia took control of the country in March 1921, the family moved to Paris. An account of Dadeshkeliani's wartime experiences, Princess in Uniform, was published in 1934.

== See also ==
- List of ambulance drivers during World War I
- List of Georgian women writers
