= Elene Virsaladze =

Elene Virsaladze, (Note: Sometimes transliterated as Elena Virsaladze) also known as E. B. Virsaladze (Georgian: ელენე ვირსალაძე; 3 January 1911 – 11 March 1977) was a prominent Georgian folklorist known for her extensive writing and fieldwork. Her work has been translated into Russian, French, German, and English.

== Biography ==
Virsaladze was born to economist Bagrat Virsaladze and botanist Elene Muskhelishvili on January 3, 1911. She was the youngest of three children. When Virsaladze was ten years old, the Red Army invaded Georgia. Her father wanted to flee to Europe to escape the occupation, where both he and his wife had been educated, but his wife refused to leave Georgia.

Virsaladze graduated high school in Georgia and moved on to Tbilisi State University (TSU), where she was tutored by folklorist Vakhtang Kotetishvili. She studied folklore and philology and graduated in 1930. In 1931, she married Shalva Khidasheli, who would later become known as a scholar of philosophy. In 1935, she graduated from the Literature, Language and Philosophy faculty at Leningrad State University in Saint Petersburg, Russia. She defended her thesis, "The Genesis of Georgian Folktales," in 1936. That same year, she returned to Tbilisi to work at TSU, lecturing on world folklore, specifically Russian folklore. She also gave birth to her only child, her daughter Manana.

Both her father and her mentor Kotetishvili were executed in 1937. Virsaladze was exiled to the Far East until 1943, when she was permitted to return to Georgia. She was sent to Gori, where she remained until 1948, when she was allowed to return to Tbilisi. She worked at the Shota Rustaveli Institute of Georgian Literature and defended her doctorate there as well.

Virsaladze became a professor at TSU shortly after earning her doctorate. In 1974, she joined the International Narrative Folklore Society and participated in international conferences. In 1976 she was made the head of the Folklore Department at TSU. She died 11 March 1977.

== Academic career ==
Virsaladze published over one hundred works during her academic career. She made expeditions into the field throughout the 1950s, 60s and 70s, collecting and recording oral traditions of peoples across Georgia. The Shota Rustaveli Institute maintains a collection of audio recordings and transcripts of the information she collected during her travels.

== Selected works ==
- The fate of the Georgian mountain peoples, 1958
- "The Amirani saga and the Georgian hunting epos", in Acta Ethnographica Academiae Scientiarum Hungaricae, 1961
- "The Main Types of Georgian Folk Pilot Literary", in Literary Researches, 1974
- Georgian hunting myths and poetry, 1976

== See also ==
- List of Georgian women writers
