= Inter-Partial League of Women =

Georgian women's organisation

The Inter-Partial League of Women was a women's organization active in Georgia, founded in 1916.

It was founded by Kato Mikeladze, who returned to Georgia after having been inspired by the suffrage movement in Western Europe. The purpose of the organization was to work for the introduction of women's suffrage. It was the first and the most prominent women's suffrage organization in Georgia, which was then a Russian province. Prior to 1905, no political organization had been allowed in Georgia, but after that year, a number of women's organization was founded.

The organization also had its own organ, the women's magazine The Voice of Georgian Women.

The organization was successful in its mission. Women's suffrage was introduced in Georgia after the independence of the Republic of Georgia from Russia in 1918, and five women were elected to the Parliament in the first democratic election of 1919.
