= Mariam Tsiklauri =

Georgian poet, children's author and translator (born 1960)

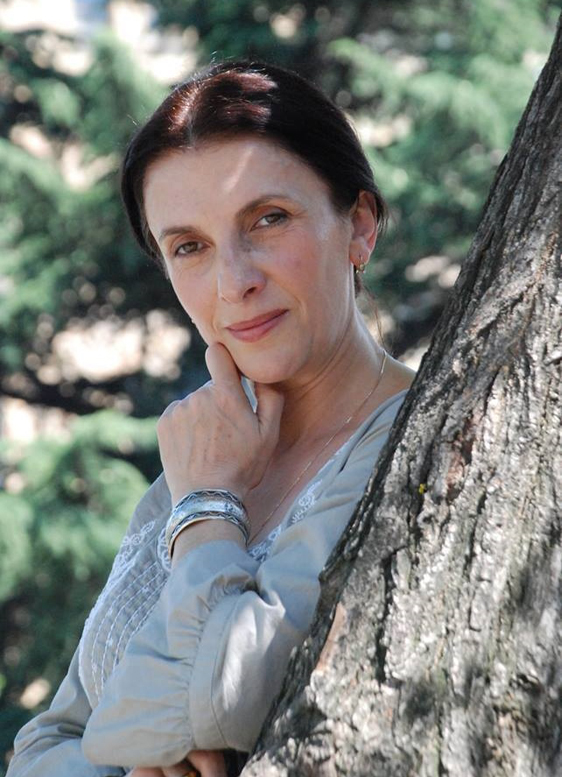
- Tsiklauri in 2013
- Born: Mariam Tsiklauri; March 18, 1960 (age 66); Tbilisi, Georgia
- Occupations: Poet, short story writer, translator
- Writing career
- Genres: Poetry, Short story
- Notable works: Ritual of Evermore, 2012
- Literary movement: modernism
- Website: armuri.georgianforum.com/t439-topic

Mariam Tsiklauri (IPA: [maɾiam tsʼikʼlauɾi]; Georgian: მარიამ წიკლაური; born 18 March 1960) is a Georgian poet, children's author and translator.

== Biography ==
Mariam Tsiklauri was born in Tbilisi, Georgia. She graduated from Tbilisi State University in 1983 as a chemist. She worked as a teacher as well as editor for various publishing houses. She also works as the curator for the Living Library project from the Ministry of Culture.

Tsiklauri is one of the founders of Children's Literature Development Fund – Libo. She is also the author of the Georgian-English anthology Georgian Female Poets, comprising poems of 32 Georgian female authors. Her poems have been translated to Lithuanian, English, German, Swedish, Ukrainian, Italian, Russian, Armenian, Czech, Slovakian and Polish languages.

== Works ==
=== Books ===
- I Hear Poems Cooee, 2001, ISBN 99928-910-0-9
- Wing of Mist Shall I Spread, 2006, ISBN 99940-3635-1
- Lanterner, 2009, ISBN 978-9941-9058-1-0
- White Calf, 2010, ISBN 978-9941-9146-5-2
- Ritual of Evermore, 2012, ISBN 978-9941-9242-9-3
- Standing Pray for the Sun, 2014, ISBN 978-9941-451-28-7
- One Hundred Poems, 2014, ISBN 978-9941-454-64-6
- Today's Day (the entreis), 2015, ISBN 978-9941-458-28-6
- For the Tameness, 2016
- For Believing, Nodar Dumbadze International Fund and Edition, ISBN 978-9941-9609-6-3
- Happy Sovieticus, Nodar Dumbadze International Fund and Edition, ISBN 978-9941-9609-5-6
- Road Crossing, Intelect Publishing, ISBN 978-9941-482-35-9

=== Children's books ===
- Brandi-Brundi, 2005, ISBN 99940-27-66-2
- Oh Talisman of the Sun, 2009, ISBN 978-9941-9073-3-3
- Naninebi (With Audio CD), 2009, ISBN 978-9941-9073-2-6
- Street and Streetlights, 2010, ISBN 978-9941-9152-2-2
- Let's Be Friends With Soap Bubbles, 2010, ISBN 978-9941-9152-1-5
- Coloring Poems, 2010, ISBN 978-9941-9109-9-9
- Funny Numbers, 2010, ISBN 978-9941-9121-8-4
- Chichita, 2011, ISSN 1987-7005; ISBN 978-99940-24-63-6
- There Was A Tale, 2011, ISBN 978-9941-433-19-1
- Realm of the Alphabet, 2012, ISBN 978-9941-442-10-0
- Georgian Alphabet, 2013, ISBN 978-9941-15-754-7
- Funny Recipes, 2016

=== Translated books ===
- Verses by Mariam Tsiklauri in the book: I Am Many (Women's Voices From Georgia) Poetry collection of twelve Georgian female authors, translated by Sabine Schiffner, project author Irma Shiolashvili, Pop-Verlag Ludwigsburg Publishing

=== Translations ===
- Giorgos Seferis — Turnaround (Nobel Prize Winners series), Tbilisi, Intellect Publishing, 2015, ISBN 978-9941-454-52-3
- Odysseas Elytis — Seven Days For Iternety (Nobel Prize Winners series), Tbilisi, Intellect Publishing, 2015, ISBN 978-9941-454-53-0
- Vladas Braziūnas — Opening of the Day, Tbilisi, Nodar Dumbadze Publishing and Literary Agency, 2018, ISBN 978-9941-9554-9-5
- Natalia Trokhym — Weary Sun, Tbilisi, Nodar Dumbadze Publishing and Literary Agency, 2018, ISBN 978-9941-9554-4-0

== Awards and honors ==
- Grand-prix of the literature competition Shotaoba, Special prize of Sandra Roelofs for the poem Golden Fish, 2009
- Makvala Mrevlishvili Prize for fertile endeavor in children's literature, 2010
- Children's Book's Second Festival Prize for "The Author of The Year's Best Children's Book" (Coloring Poems, Shemetsneba Publishing), 2010
- Prize from female poet competition Khvarazmoba, 2011, 2015, 2016
- Gala (literary prize) for poem collection White Calf, 2011
- Winner of St. Nino festival, 2011
- Prize and medal of the Georgian Spirit Festival, 2012
- First Prize of literature competition Shotaoba, 2012, 2013
- Iakob Gogebashvili youth and children's literature prize for the nomination of 'Year's best poetic collection', for the book 'Joyful Recipes', 2017
- Nominated for Astrid Lindgren Memorial Award (ALMA) 2019 for work dedicated to children
- Iakob Gogebashvili youth and children's literature prize for the nomination of 'Children and Youth's Innovative Project'. for TV project "Club Do" (In collaboration with Nino Chkhikvadze), 2019

== Sources ==
- TSIKLAURI MARIAM
- Poems by Mariam Tsiklauri
- Mariam Tsiklauri' Profile
- ONCE … — MARIAM TSIKLAURI, translated by Manana Matiashvili in the 'Masque & Spectacle' magazine, June 1, 2017, number 12: Transcaucasia Issue
- Read Poetry: (I have searched…), by Mariam Tsiklauri
- MARIAM TSIKLAURI AUTHOR
