= Dato Barbakadze =

Georgian writer

Dato Barbakadze (Georgian: დათო ბარბაქაძე); born 7 February 1966) is a Georgian writer, essayist and translator.

== Biography ==
Dato Barbakadze was born in Tbilisi. He studied philosophy and psychology in Tbilisi State University between 1984 and 1992 and holds a Masters degree in Philosophy. In 1992-1994 he pursued his post-graduate studies in the Department of Sociology at Tbilisi State University, but left a standard academic career to pursue independent projects in Georgian and German literature: he has followed a non-traditional academic path for the past twenty years (2010). In 1991 Dato Barbakadze founded a literary video-magazine Dato Barbakadze’s Magazine, which for two years was regularly performed at Tbilisi State University. He also founded the literary magazines Polilogue (1994, four issues) and ± Literature (1996, four issues). These publications featured many of the innovations of Georgian literature in the 1990s. From 1991 to 2001 Dato Barbakadze taught courses in logic, the history of philosophy, esthetics and introductory philosophy courses in several universities in Tbilisi. In 2002-2005 he lived in Germany where he pursued his literary interests and studied philosophy, ancient history and sociology at Westphalian Wilhelms-University of Münster. After returning to Tbilisi in 2005 Dato Barbakadze started the project XXth century Austrian Poetry, serving both as an editor and contributor. Dato Barbakadze has been a member of Die Kogge, an association of European writers, since 2007. His works have been translated into English, German, French and Russian. He lives in Tbilisi, Georgia.

== Published works ==
(Georgian titles in parentheses)

Poetry:

- Condolences to Fall (მივუსამძიმროთ შემოდგომას). Tbilisi 1991.
- Longing for Logic (ლოგიკის მონატრება). Tbilisi 1993, ISBN 99928-0-264-2.
- Putting the Question (საკითხის დასმა). Tbilisi 1994, ISBN 99928-0-265-0.
- One minute or One Life Before the Journey (გამგზავრებამდე ერთი წუთით ან ერთი სიცოცხლით ადრე). Tbilisi 1994, ISBN 99928-0-239-1.
- Roofbuilder (მხურავი). Tbilisi 1995, ISBN 99928-0-240-5.
- Negation of the Summary (შეჯამების უარყოფა). Tbilisi 1999, ISBN 99928-0-013-5.
- Essential Steps (არსებითი სვლები). Tbilisi 2001, ISBN 99928-0-125-5.
- The Songs of Lake Embankment (ტბის სანაპიროს სიმღერები). Tbilisi 2004, ISBN 99940-29-43-6.
- Poems 1984–2004 (ლექსები 1984-2004). Tbilisi 2008, ISBN 978-9941-0-0347-9.
- ars poetica. Tbilisi 2010, ISBN 978-9941-9115-4-5.
- In Defense of Memory (მეხსიერების დასაცავად). Tbilisi 2013, ISBN 978-9941-0-5981-0.
- From a Problematic Light (პრობლემური სინათლის გამო). Tbilisi 2015, ISBN 978-9941-0-8056-2.
- The window (სარკმელი). Tbilisi 2016, ISBN 978-9941-0-8444-7.
- Skeptical Etudes (სკეპტიკური ეტიუდები). Tbilisi 2019, ISBN 978-9941-8-0992-7.
- and so on (და ასე შემდეგ). Seven Haiku Wreaths. Tbilisi 2019, ISBN 978-9941-8-1470-9.

Prose:

- Mutation (მუტაცია). Novel. Tbilisi 1993.
- The second heel of Achilles (აქილევსის მეორე ქუსლი). Novel. Tbilisi 2000, ISBN 99928-0-042-9.
- Short Prose 1990-2010 (მცირე პროზა 1990-2010). Tbilisi 2010, ISBN 978-9941-0-2441-2.

Collected Essays:

- Poetry and Politics (პოეზია და პოლიტიკა). Tbilisi 1992.
- Resistances Head-On (შემხვედრი წინააღმდეგობები). Tbilisi 1994.
- Questions and Social Environment (კითხვები და სოციალური გარემო). Tbilisi 2000, ISBN 99928-0-041-0.
- Fragmentarium I. Tbilisi 2006, ISBN 978-99940-0-982-4.
- Fragmentarium II, III. Tbilisi 2008, ISBN 978-9941-0-0381-3.
- Fragmentarium IV. Tbilisi 2011, ISBN 978-9941-0-3279-0.
- Fragmentarium V, VI, VII. Tbilisi 2013, ISBN 978-9941-0-5264-4.
- Fragmentarium I-VII. Tbilisi 2013, ISBN 978-9941-0-5306-1.
- Fragmentarium VIII. Tbilisi 2015, ISBN 978-9941-0-7444-8.
- Reflektions on the German-language poetry of the XX. century. Tbilisi 2015, ISBN 978-9941-0-7527-8.
- Fragmentarium I-VIII. Tbilisi 2018, ISBN 978-9941-26-319-4.

Letters on Literature:

- D/D (დ/დ). Tbilisi 2006, ISBN 99940-67-99-0.
- Unrealistically (არარეალურად). Tbilisi 2010, ISBN 978-9941-0-2442-9.
- Continuation (გაგრძელება). Tbilisi 2012, ISBN 978-9941-0-3977-5.

Translations (into Georgian):

- From XX century German Poetry. Tbilisi 1992.
- Collection of European and American Poetry. Volume I. Tbilisi 1992.
- Collection of European and American Poetry. Volume II. Tbilisi 1993.
- Collection of European and American Poetry. Volume III. Tbilisi 2000, ISBN 99928-0-091-7.
- Hans Arp: Poems. Tbilisi 1992.
- Georg Trakl: Poems. Tbilisi 1999.
- Paul Celan: Poems. Tbilisi 2001.
- Hans Magnus Enzensberger: Poems. Tbilisi 2002, ISBN 99928-0-453-X.
- Brita Steinwendtner: Red Pool. Novel. Tbilisi 2005, ISBN 99940-29-75-4.
- Hans Magnus Enzensberger: Poems from The Language of the Country. Tbilisi 2007, ISBN 978-99940-0-803-2.
- XXth Century American Poets. Tbilisi 2008.
- Marianne Gruber: I do not know, if I am. Poems. Tbilisi 2008. ISBN 978-9941-12-258-2.
- Ernst Meister: Poems. Tbilisi 2009, ISBN 978-9941-9048-5-1.
- Translated due to circumstances 1989-2010. Tbilisi 2011, ISBN 978-9941-0-3278-3.
- Banesh Hoffmann: Albert Einstein. Biography. Tbilisi 2012, ISBN 978-9941-9221-9-0.
- Wladimir Pack, Andrej Baranjuk: Robert Fisher. Biography. Tbilisi 2012, ISBN 978-9941-9239-8-2.
- From 20. century German Poetry. Tbilisi 2012, ISBN 978-9941-0-4450-2.
- Hans Magnus Enzensberger: The Wolves Defended Against the Lambs. Poems. Tbilisi 2013, ISBN 978-9941-0-5212-5.
- Ernst Meister: Simple Creation. Poems. Tbilisi 2013, ISBN 978-9941-0-5214-9.
- Georg Trakl: DE PROFUNDIS. Selected Poems. Tbilisi 2014, ISBN 978-9941-0-6959-8.
- Michael Guttenbrunner: Holy Break. Poems. Tbilisi 2015, ISBN 978-9941-0-7368-7.
- Wilhelm Szabo: Simultaneity. Poems. Tbilisi 2015, ISBN 978-9941-0-7369-4.
- Günter Eich: Messages from the Rain. Poems. Tbilisi 2015, ISBN 978-9941-0-7651-0.
- Norbert Bolz: Who is Afraid of Philosophy? An essay. Tbilisi 2016, ISBN 978-9941-9469-5-0.
- The Secret of the Pearl. Jesidic Sacred Poetry. Tbilisi 2017, ISBN 978-9941-26-028-5.
- Translations 2014-2017. Tbilisi 2018, ISBN 978-9941-27-781-8.
- Helmuth A. Niederle: A Holy River. Poems. Tbilisi 2018, ISBN 978-9941-8-0148-8.
- Nikolaus Lenau: The Distance. Poems. Tbilisi 2018, ISBN 978-9941-26-339-2.
- Ilse Aichinger: Verschenkter Rat. poems. Tbilisi 2019, ISBN 978-9941-26-608-9.
- Friedrich Hebbel: The Nibelungs. Der gehörnte Siegfried. Siegfrieds Tod. Tbilisi 2020, ISBN 978-9941-26-686-7.
- Friedrich Nietzsche: Dionysian-Dithyrambs. Tbilisi 2021, ISBN 978-9941-8-3222-2.
- Translations 2018–2021. Tbilisi 2021, ISBN 978-9941-8-3652-7.

=== Collected works ===
- Outcomes (შედეგები). Volume I. Mertskuli, Tbilisi 2014. ISBN 978-9941-0-7002-0.
- Outcomes (შედეგები). Volume II. Mertskuli, Tbilisi 2014. ISBN 978-9941-0-7003-7.
- Outcomes (შედეგები). Volume III. Mertskuli, Tbilisi 2014. ISBN 978-9941-0-7004-4.
- Outcomes (შედეგები). Volume IV. Mertskuli Verlag, Tbilisi 2018. ISBN 978-9941-8-0757-2.
- Outcomes (შედეგები). Volume V. Mertskuli, Tbilisi 2014. ISBN 978-9941-0-7113-3.
- Outcomes (შედეგები). Volume VI. Mertskuli, Tbilisi 2014. ISBN 978-9941-0-7027-3.
- Outcomes (შედეგები). Volume VII. Mertskuli, Tbilisi 2019. ISBN 978-9941-8-0993-4.
- Outcomes (შედეგები). Volume VIII. Mertskuli, Tbilisi 2014. ISBN 978-9941-0-7114-0.
- Outcomes (შედეგები). Volume IX. Mertskuli, Tbilisi 2014. ISBN 978-9941-0-7115-7.

== Works in another language ==
=== In German ===
- Das Dreieck der Kraniche. Gedichte. Pop, Ludwigsburg 2007, ISBN 978-3-937139-38-8.
- Die Poetik der folgenden Sekunde. Poesie und Prosa. Drava, Klagenfurt 2008, ISBN 978-3-85435-557-1.
- Wesentliche Züge und zwölf andere Gedichte. Mischwesen, Neubiberg 2010, ISBN 3-938313-11-0.
- Die Leidenschaft der Märtyrer. SuKulTur, Berlin 2012, ISBN 978-3-941592-35-3.
- Die Unmöglichkeit des Wortes. Theoretische Manifestationen. Pop, Ludwigsburg 2016, ISBN 978-3-86356-177-2.
- Meditation über den gefallenen Baum. Gedichte. Löcker, Wien 2016. ISBN 978-3-85409-766-2.
- Das Gebet und andere Gedichte. Pop, Ludwigsburg 2018, ISBN 978-3-86356-220-5.
- Wenn das Lied sich vom ermüdeten Körper befreit. Gedichte. Pop, Ludwigsburg 2018, ISBN 978-3-86356-241-0.
- Und so weiter. Sieben Haiku-Kränze. Deutsch von Maja Lisowski. Nachdichtung von Theo Breuer. Pop Verlag, Ludwigsburg 2021, ISBN 978-3-86356-322-6.

=== In English ===
- Still Life With Snow and Other Poems. Bedouin Books, Port Townsend 2014, ISBN 978-0-983-2987-9-3.
- Passion of the Martyrs. Universali Publishing House, Tbilisi, Seattle 2017, ISBN 978-9941-22-970-1.

=== In Russian ===
- Разное. Поэзия, проза, эссе. Издательство Meрцкули, Тбилиси 2016, ISBN 978-9941-0-8749-3.

== Publishing Project Austrian Poetry of the XXth Century (in Georgian) ==
- Volume I: Hugo von Hofmannsthal, Richard von Schaukal. Saari, Tbilisi 2006, ISBN 99940-29-94-0.
- Volume II: Georg Trakl. Saari, Tbilisi 2006, ISBN 99940-29-95-9.
- Volume III: Rainer Maria Rilke. Saari, Tbilisi 2007, ISBN 978-99940-60-30-6.
- Volume IV: Anton Wildgans, Albert Ehrenstein, Felix Braun. Saari, Tbilisi 2007, ISBN 978-99940-60-31-3.
- Volume V: Franz Werfel, Alexander Lernet-Holenia Polylogi, Tbilisi 2010, ISBN 978-9941-9048-4-4.
- Volume VI: Josef Weinheber. Polylogi, Tbilisi 2009, ISBN 978-9941-9048-3-7.
- Volume VII: Alma Johanna Koenig, Paula von Preradović, Erika Mitterer. Polylogi, Tbilisi 2010, ISBN 978-9941-9115-2-1.
- Volume IX: Theodor Kramer, Ernst Waldinger, Wilhelm Szabo. Samizdat, Tbilisi 2019, ISBN 978-9941-8-1138-8.
- Volume XI: Paul Celan. Samizdat, Tbilisi 2011, ISBN 978-9941-0-3978-2.
- Volume XII: Ingeborg Bachmann. Polylogi, Tbilisi 2010, ISBN 978-9941-9115-1-4.
- Volume XIII: Christine Lavant, Christine Busta. Polylogi, Tbilisi 2008, ISBN 978-9941-9048-4-4.
- Volume XIV: Hans Carl Artmann. Polylogi, Tbilisi 2008, ISBN 978-9941-9048-2-0.
- Volume XV: Ilse Aichinger, Friederike Mayröcker. Samizdat, Tbilisi 2020, ISBN 978-9941-8-2325-1.
