= Naira Gelashvili =

Georgian writer

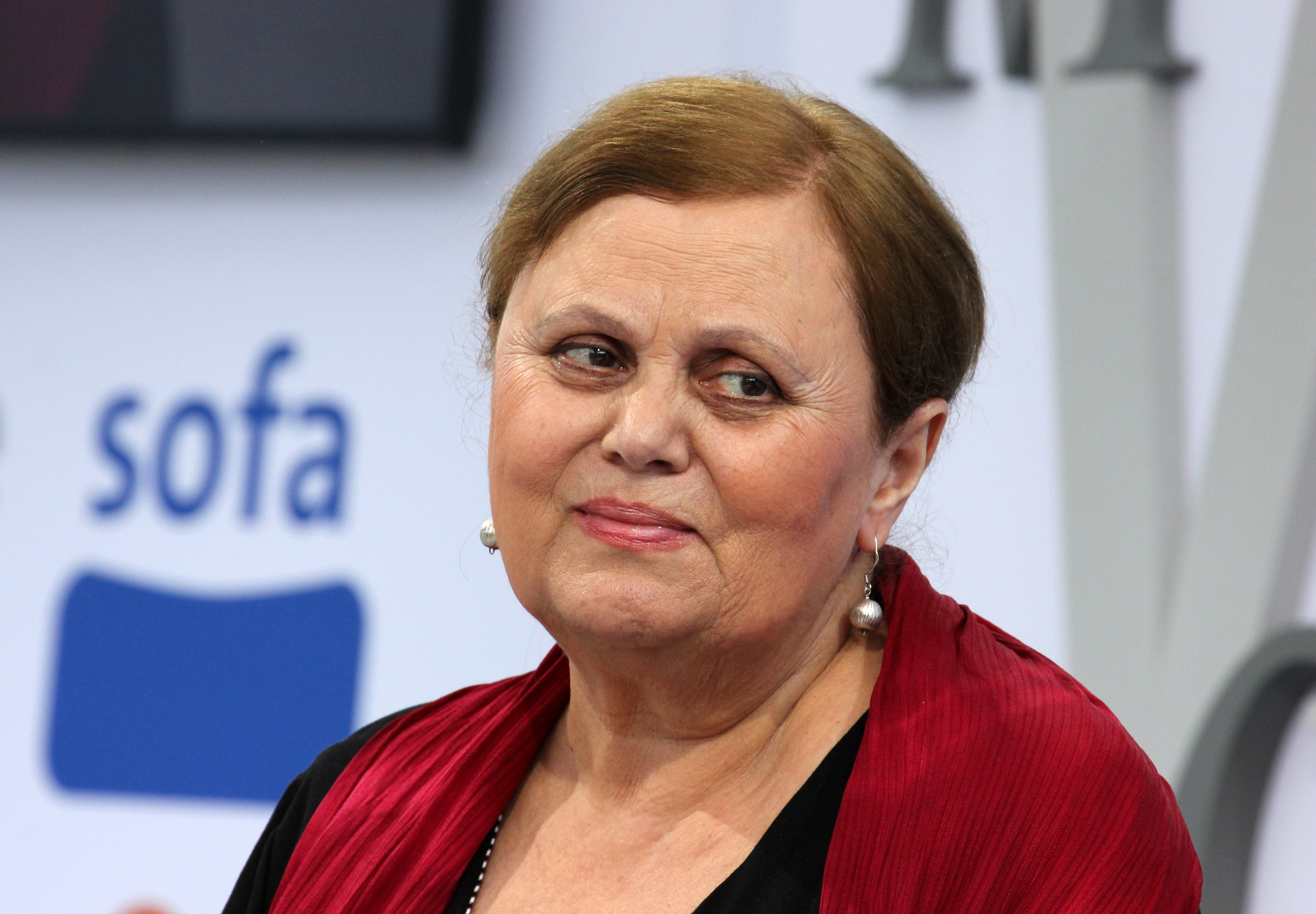
- Born: 28 October 1947 (age 79); Sighnaghi, Georgian SSR
- Occupations: Novelist, short story writer, Poet
- Spouse: Giwi Margwelaschwili (1970-2020; his death)
- Children: 1
- Writing career
- Notable works: The Ambri, the Umbri and the Arab; I am that One
- Movements: Modernism, magical realism

Naira Gelashvili (Georgian: ნაირა გელაშვილი) (born 28 October 1947) is a Georgian fiction writer, philologist, Germanist, and civil society activist.

== Life and career ==
Gelashvili graduated from the Faculty of Western European Literature, Tbilisi State University, in 1970. She has published a series of stories and the novel dedis otakhi (დედის ოთახი; "The Mother's Room", 1985). She is one of the most ardent followers of European existentialist prose in modern Georgian literature. Gelashvili has also studied folklore of the Caucasian peoples and heads the cultural NGO The Caucasian House.

== Bibliography ==
=== Novels and short story collections ===
- Mother's Room (1987)
- The Moonlit Garden (1990)
- Tragic Gradation
- Hut of Dots
- Pieces of Mirror (2006)
- The Ambri, the Umbri and the Arab (1982)
- Short Stories
- I am that One (2012)
- Ich bin sie. Roman (translation from Georgian into German by Lia Wittek), Verbrecher Verlag, Berlin 2017, ISBN 978-3-95732-230-2

=== Poetry ===
- About Peace, Sorrow and Consolation (Four poems, 1997)
- Time, Bread and Wine (A collection of verses, poems and songs, 2006)

== Awards ==
- Literary prize “Saba” for the best novel of the year for "I am That One" (2013)
- Literary prize “Saba” for the best novel of the year for “The First Two Circles and all the Others” (2010)
- Ilia Chavchavadze State Prize for Artistic Work
- Literary prize "Gala" for the best literary project for Rainer Maria Rilke (works in five volumes with commentaries) (2007)
- Prize of Austrian Ministry of Culture for translations of R. M. Rilke works (1999)
