= Ekaterine Gabashvili =

Georgian writer and feminist (1851–1938)

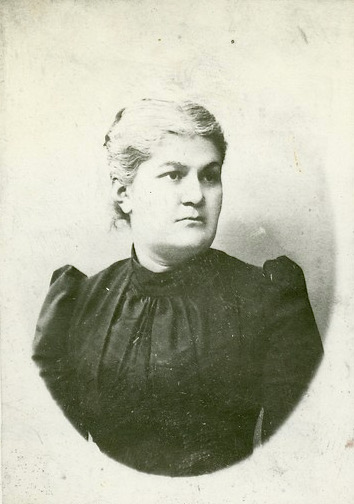
A portrait of Ekaterine Gabashvili by Alexander Roinashvili, no later than 1898

Ekaterine Gabashvili (Georgian: ეკატერინე გაბაშვილი, née Tarkhnishvili (თარხნიშვილი); 16 June 1851 – 7 August 1938) was a Georgian writer, feminist and public figure who called for social reform in favour of women's emancipation.

== Biography ==
Born on 16 June 1851, Ekaterine Tarkhnishvili was born into an aristocratic family in Gori, then part of Imperial Russia. She was the daughter of Revaz Tarkhnishvili and Sopio Bagraton-Davitashvili. After completing her primary education, she attended the city's best school, a private boarding school run by Madam Favre. At 17, she opened a private school devoted to the education of peasant children, concerned as she was by the conditions of the peasantry. She married Aleksandre Gabashvili when she was 19, eventually raising 11 children.

Her writing was influenced by two works on the emancipation of women which had been published in Georgian: Harriet Taylor Mill's The Enfranchisement of Women and Fanny Lewald's Für und wider die Frauen. As a result, from 1872 she set about mobilizing Georgian women by establishing women's circles in Tbilisi, Kutaisi, Gori and Khoni, focused on the publication and translation of relevant women's literature. In 1897, she established a women's professional school which led to girls schools around the country.

Gabashvili was an active member of the Society for the Advancement of Learning Among Georgians. In 1890, together with Anastasia Tumanishvili-Tsereteli, she co-founded Jejili, a journal which published children's literature, encouraging interest in the genre in Georgia.

Gabashvili was the maternal grandmother of Maro Makashvili.

== Publications ==
She authored several sentimental novels and stories about the sorrows of village schoolteachers and peasant life. Her novels Love Affair in Big Kheva and While Sorting Maize upset the social norms of the day, calling for personal freedom and romantic love.

In the 1900s, she abandoned fiction for autobiography. Gabashvili is also known as one of the first Georgian feminists and women’s rights activists. In 1958, a movie Magdanas lurja (Magdana's Donkey), based on one of Gabashvili’s novels and directed by Tengiz Abuladze and Revaz Chkheidze, won prizes at the international film festivals at Cannes and Edinburgh.

== See also ==
- Elizabeth Orbeliani
- Anastasia Tumanishvili-Tsereteli
- Olga Guramishvili-Nikoladze
- Dominika Eristavi
- List of Georgian women writers
