= Nestan Kvinikadze =

Nestan-Nene Kvinikadze
- Born: June 5, 1980 (age 44); Tbilisi, Georgia
- Occupation: novelist, journalist

Nestan (Nene) Kvinikadze (Georgian: ნესტან-ნენე კვინიკაძე) (born June 5, 1980, Tbilisi), Georgian writer, scriptwriter and journalist. She graduated from the Shota Rustavelie State University of Film and Theatre. Her first book was published at the age of 18. She is an author of numerous movie-scripts and plays. She has published numerous collections of prose fiction and one novel - Ispahan Nightingales. Since 2006 she is the editor-in-chief of monthly bilingual (Georgian/English] free magazine - "Focus". Her articles and essays are regularly being published in Anabechdi magazine. Since March, 2007 she is one of the producers of Rustavi 2. She is one of the organizers of art festivals "Mziuri" and "Train".

Bibliography

- Unanimously | 1999
  - Short Story
- Amargi, Saari Publishing | 2001
  - Documentary Novel
- Singing Fountains Georgian Book Publishing | 2003
- Nightingales of Isfahan, Arete Publishing | 2004
  - Short Story
- Herself, Nestan Kvinikadze Publishing | 2005
  - Short Story
- Techno of Jaguars, Nestan Kvinikadze Publishing | 2008
- Techno der Jaguare: Neuve Erzählerinnen aus Georgien, Frankfurter Verlagsanstalt | 2013
