= Manana Antadze =

Georgian writer and translator (born 1945)

- Born: Manana Antadze; August 28, 1945 (age 81); Tbilisi, Georgia
- Occupations: Writer, essayist, translator
- Spouse(s): Eldar Tsitsishvili, architect-restorer
- Children: David (1965), Tamara (1971)
- Writing career
- Genres: Epic, drama, tragicomedy, comedy
- Notable works: Translation of Macbeth by William Shakespeare, 2008

Manana Antadze (Georgian: მანანა ანთაძე, born August 28, 1945) is a Georgian writer and translator, and founder of the Tumanishvili Theatre Foundation.

== Life and career ==
In 1967 Manana Antadze graduated from Tbilisi State University (TSU), Western European Languages and Literature.

From 1981 to 1989, Antadze was a research associate at the Centre for Contemporary Literary Studies at the Georgian State University. She has been a freelance translator since 1974, and her numerous translations include William Shakespeare's Macbeth, Irving Stone's Lust for Life, and J. K. Rowling's Harry Potter and the Philosopher's Stone.

In 2006, Antadze presented the annual awards given for "New Writing" in "New Georgian play" and "The Best Translation". In July 2009, she attended the 31st Cambridge Seminar on Contemporary Literature, then, in August she attended Globe Education Cultural Seminar on "Shakespeare & His Stage".

Antadze's biography is included in Who is Who in Georgia (2009).

=== Work experience ===
- 1971–present, Freelance translator
- 1981–1989, Center for Contemporary Western Literary Studies, TSU (research associate)
- 1981–present, Tumanishvili Film Actors’ Theatre (Literary manager)
- 1998–present, Tumanishvili Theatre Foundation (Founder and President)
- 2006–present, Legal Leader of International Drama Competition ‘NEW WRITING IN GEORGIA’
- 2012–present, Sturua Productions/Founder with Robert Sturua and Gia Tevzadze

==== Education and training ====
- 1962–1967, MA/BA Tbilisi State University (TSU), Western European Languages and Literature
- 2009, 31st Cambridge Seminar "Contemporary Literature" (alumna)
- 2009, Globe Education Cultural Seminar "Shakespeare and his Stage" (alumna)

==== Memberships ====
- Inner Wheel (Rotary) Club
- Eurodram
- Georgian Writers’ Union
- Georgian Theatre Craftsmen’s Union

== Works ==
=== Publications ===
- 1989, "Edward Albee: Existential Intuition" in Modern Western Drama, with I. Gogoberidze and L. Kereselidze

=== Translations staged (in Georgian) ===
- 1978 – Eugene O'Neill, Desire Under the Elms, director Temur Chkheidze
- 1980 – William Gibson, The Cry Of Players, director Andro Enukidze
- 1981 – Moliere, Dom Juan, director Mikheil Tumanishvili
- 1982 – Rudyard Kipling, The Cat That Walked By Himself, director Nana Demetrashvili
- 2004 – Dario Fo, The Open Couple, director Keti Dolidze
- 2005 – Anton Chekhov, The Cherry Orchard, director Gogi Margvelashvili
- 2006 – George S. Kaufman & Edna Ferber, The Royal Family, director Keti Dolidze
- 2007 – Nikolai Gogol, Revisor (Inspector), director Otar Egadze
- 2007 – Bertolt Brecht, Mother Courage, commissioned by David Doiashvili
- 2009 – William Shakespeare, Macbeth, director David Doiashvili
- 2010 – Edmond Rostand, Cyrano De Bergerac, director David Doiashvili
- 2010 – David Hastings, One Small Step, commissioned by British Council Georgia
- 2012 – Terrence McNally, Master Class, director Robert Sturua
- 2014 – Maxim Gorky, The Lower Depths, director David Doiashvili
- 2015 – William Shakespeare, Julius Caesar, commissioned by Robert Sturua
- 2015 – William Shakespeare, King Lear, director Zurab Getsadze
- 2015 – Tennessee Williams, A Streetcar Named Desire, director Keti Dolidze

=== Translations published ===
- 1971 – Irving Stone, Lust For Life
- 1978 – H. G. Wells, Russia in the Shadows
- 1979 – Eugene O'Neill, Desire Under The Elms
- 2002 – J. K. Rowling, Harry Potter and the Philosopher's Stone, ISBN 99928-986-5-8
- 2009 – Tennessee Williams, Camino Real, ISBN 978-9941-9149-6-6
- 2012 – Terrence McNally, Master Class, ISBN 978-9941-9236-92
- 2014 – Anton Chekhov, The Cherry Orchard, ISBN 978-9941-9352-3-7
- 2014 – Moliere, Dom Juan, ISBN 978-9941-9352-4-4
- 2014 – Edmond Rostand, Cyrano De Bergerac, ISBN 978-9941-9352-6-8
- 2014 – William Shakespeare, Macbeth, ISBN 978-9941-9352-5-1

== Honors and awards ==
- 2002 – Honorary Citizen of Domrémy-la-Pucelle, France.
- 2015 – Ivane Machabeli Prise
