= Ana Kordzaia-Samadashvili =

Georgian writer and literary journalist (born 1968)

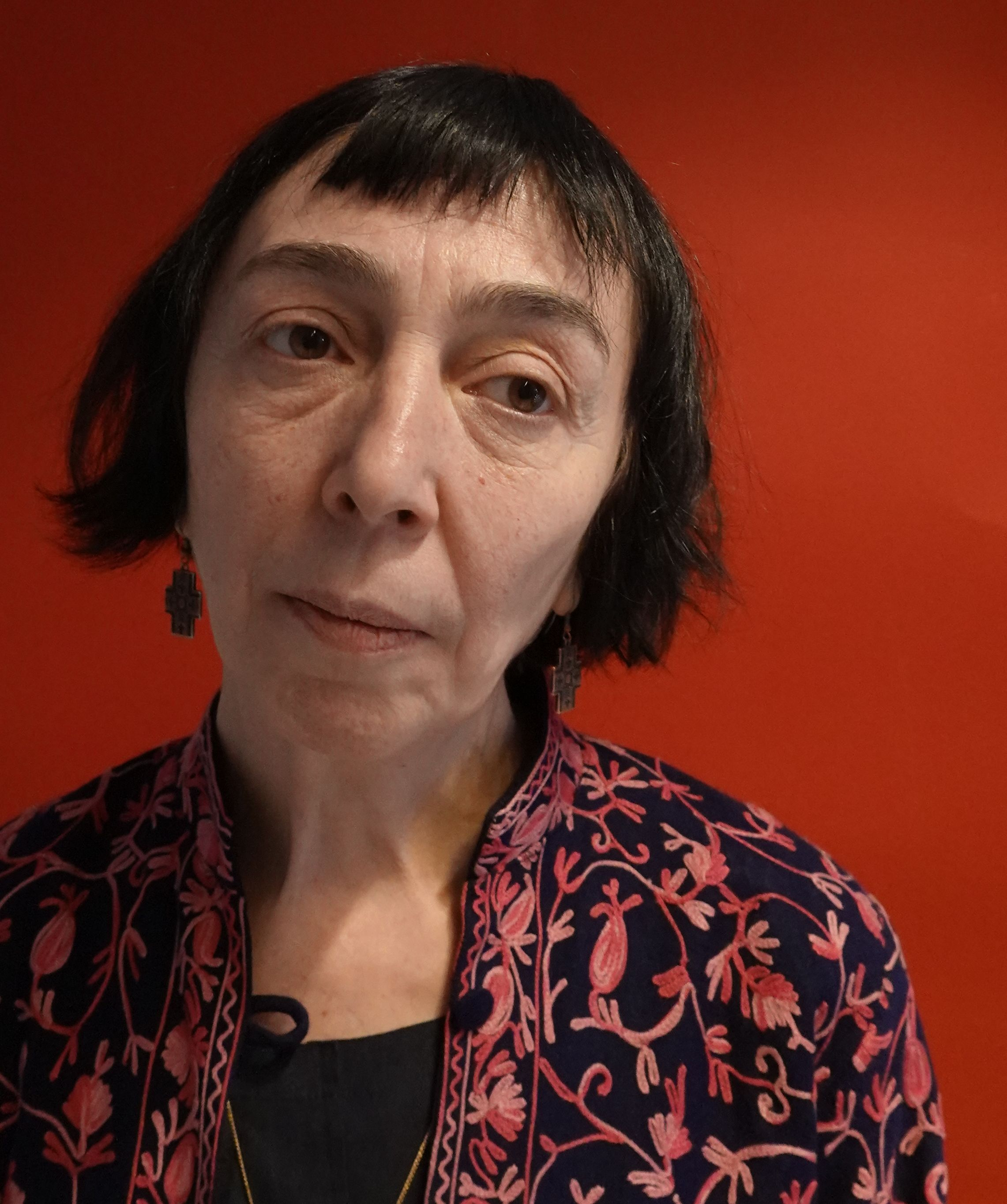
- Born: February 26, 1968 (age 58); Tbilisi, Georgia
- Occupations: Novelist, short story writer, journalist, translator
- Writing career
- Literary movement: Postmodernism

Ana Kordzaia-Samadashvili (Georgian: ანა კორძაია-სამადაშვილი; born February 26, 1968) is a Georgian writer and literary journalist who authored some of the best-selling prose of post-Soviet Georgian literature.

== Biography ==
Ana Kordzaia-Samadashvili was born in 1968 and lives in Tbilisi. She is a writer, translator and literary journalist. She has won many Georgian literary prizes including the Saba Prize, the IliaUni Literary Prize and the Goethe Institute Award.

Some of her works have been translated into English (Me, Margarita: Stories – Dalkey Archive Press ISBN 156478875X), German (Ich, Margarita – Verlag Hans Schiler ISBN 389930408X) and Swedish.

== Selected works ==
- Who Killed Chaika?, Bakur Sulakauri Publishing, 2013
- Marieta’s Way, Palitra L Publishing, 2012
- Children of Nightfall, Bakur Sulaakuri Publishing, 2011
- Me, Margarita, Bakur Sulaakuri Publishing, 2005, 2015 ISBN 978-1564788757
- Berikaoba, Bakur Sulakauri Publishing, 2003

== Literary prizes and awards ==
- IliaUni Literary prize 2013 in the category "Best Novel" for Who Killed Chaika?
- Literary Award SABA 2003 in the category "Best Debut" for Berikaoba
- Goethe Institute Prize 1999 in the category "Best Translation" for her translation of Die Liebhaberinnen by Elfriede Jelinek
