= Leo Kiacheli =

Leon Shengelaia
- ლეო ქიაჩელი
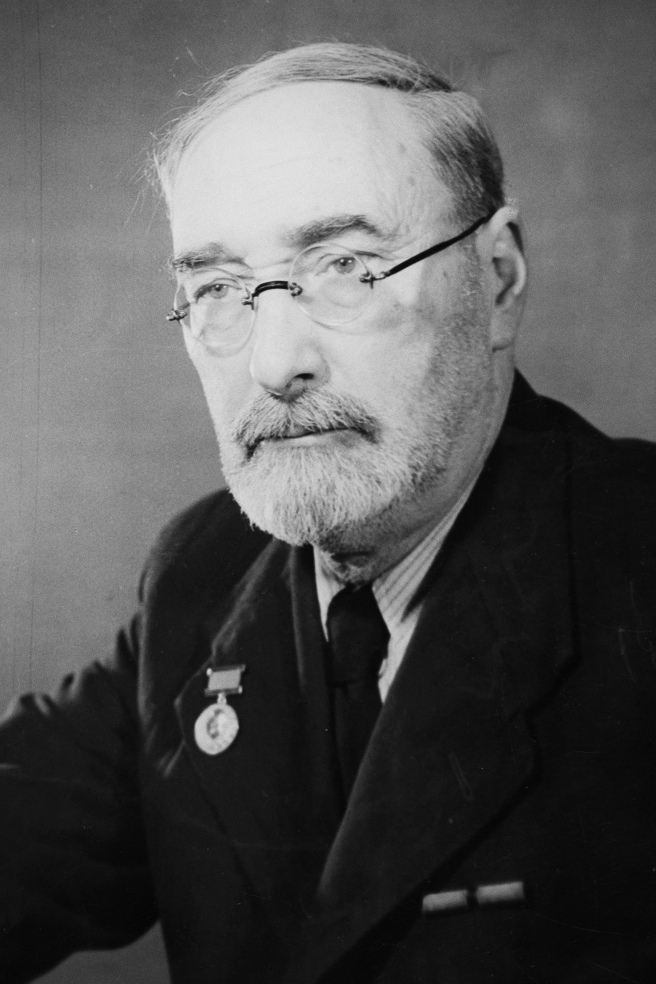
- Born: 19 February 1884; Obuji, Kutaisi Governorate, Russian Empire
- Died: 25 December 1963 (aged 79); Tbilisi, Georgian SSR, Soviet Union
- Occupation: Writer
- Writing career
- Pen name: Leo Kiacheli
- Language: Georgian
- Period: 1909–1963
- Genre: Realism
- Notable works: Haki Adzba (1933); Gvadi Bigva (1936)
- Literary movement: Socialist realism

Leo Kiacheli (Georgian: ლეო ქიაჩელი) (born Leon Mikhailovich Shengelaia; 19 February 1884, Obudzhi village (now Tsalenjikha Municipality) – 25 December 1963, Tbilisi) (Note: Great Soviet Encyclopedia and Georgian Soviet Encyclopedia say that he died on 19 December 1963; however, his obituaries, published on 27 December 1963, say that he died on 25 December 1963.) was a Soviet and Georgian writer. He has been published since 1909, noted for the novels Gvadi Bigva, Tavadis Kali Maya (Princess Maya), Almasgir Kibulan, and Haki Adzba.

Leo was born into a noble family. In 1904-1905 he studied at the Kharkov University. He participated in the Revolution of 1905-1907. In 1912 he left for Switzerland and returned to Georgia after the February Revolution of 1917.

== Major works ==
=== Novels and novellas ===
- Tariel Golua (1916)
- Almazgir Kibulan (1925)
- Blood (1926—1927)
- Tavadis Kali Maya (Princess Maya) (1927)
- Haki Adzba (1933)
- Gvadi Bigva (1936—1937)
- Man of Mountain (1948)

== Awards ==
- Stalin prize (1941)
- Order of Lenin (1954)
- Two Order of the Red Banner of Labor (1939 and 1946)
