= Ekaterine Togonidze =

Georgian writer (born 1981)

Ekaterine Togonidze ეკატერინე ტოგონიძე
- Born: March 16, 1981 (age 44); Tbilisi, Georgia
- Occupation: Writer

Ekaterine Togonidze (Georgian: ეკატერინე ტოგონიძე, born March 16, 1981) is a Georgian journalist and writer, and activist for the rights of the disabled.

== Biography ==
Ekaterine Togonidze was born on March 16, 1981, in Tbilisi, Georgia. She studied journalism at the Ivane Javakhishvili Tbilisi State University. She presented educational programmes on the First Channel on Georgian Public Television.

Togonidze made her literary debut in 2011 with her collection of short stories titled Anesthesia, in which she introduced a new topic into Georgian literature, that of the discrimination faced by the disabled in society. Her emphasis on the psychological and social aspects of their lives and her narrative technique were lauded.

Togonidze's books have been translated into English and German.

== Works and awards ==
- Anesthesia, a collection of short stories, published 2011, won the Saba literary award for Best Debut of the Year in 2012.
- A-synchrony, won the Saba literary award in 2014.
- The other way, a novel.
- Listen to me, a novel.
