= Tamri Pkhakadze =

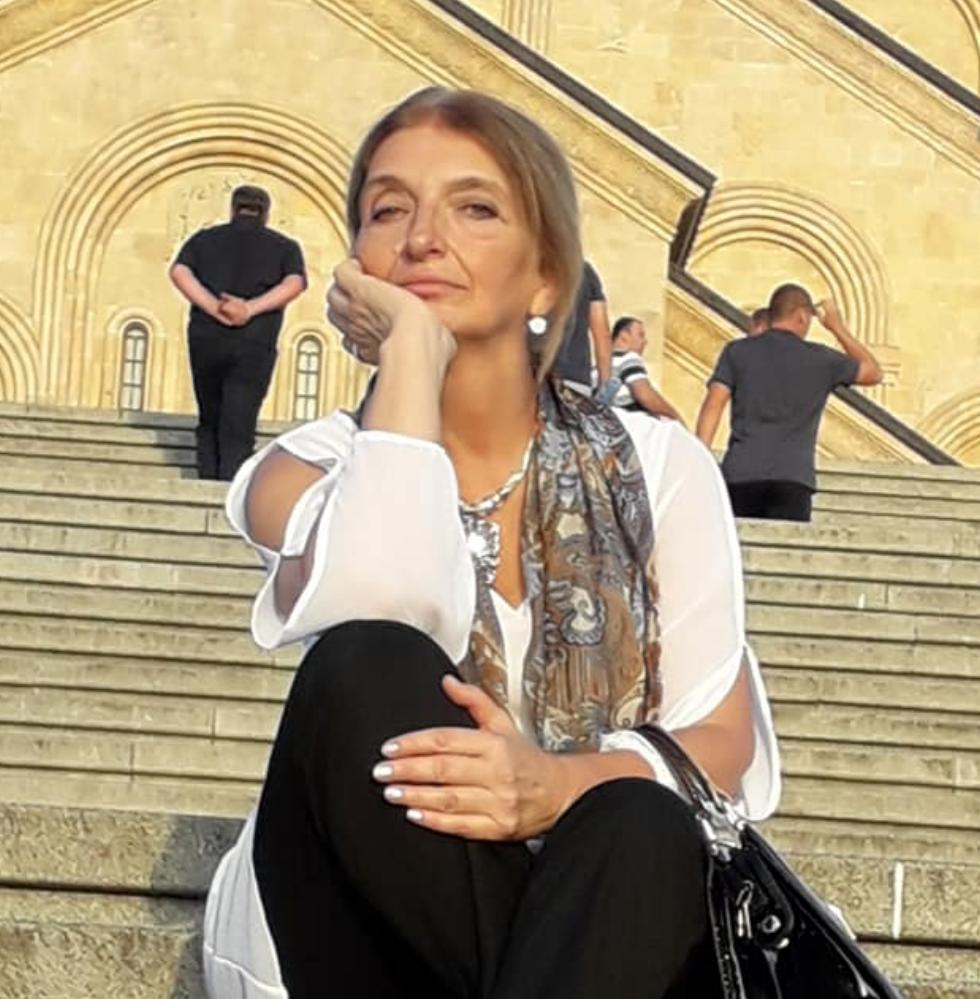
- Tamri Pkhakadze, 2018
- Born: Tamri Pkhakadze; July 28, 1957 (age 69); Tbilisi, Georgia
- Occupations: Novelist, short story writer, translator
- Children: Nino Kapanadze
- Writing career
- Genres: Prose, Short story, Drama
- Notable works: Kitchen Gardening in a War Zone, 2010
- Literary movement: Metamodernism
- Website: tamribooks.home.blog

Tamri Pkhakadze (IPA: [tʰamɾi pʰχakʼadze]; Georgian: თამრი ფხაკაძე; born 28 July 1957) is a Georgian writer, playwright, children's author and translator.

== Biography ==
Tamri Pkhakadze was born in Tbilisi, Georgia. She graduated from Tbilisi State University in 1979 as a philologist. She has a PhD in philology.

1980-2006 she worked in the Old Georgian Literature department at the Shota Rustaveli Institute of Georgian Literature. In 2011 she has been working for the publishing house "Triasi" as editor in chief.

She has published novels, collections of prose, plays and children’s books. Several children’s songs have been composed to her verses. Quite a few of her works have been staged in various theatres, among them Kitchen Gardening in a War Zone, which has been performed in four different cities.

== Works ==
=== Books ===
- Stop, Kira, Stop!, Palitra L Publishing, 2022, ISBN 978-9941-35-262-1
- Long-nosed Sorcerer Marcia, King Chubby the First and Others, Bakur Sulakauri Publishing, 2016, ISBN 978-9941-2370-0-3
- Hymn of Alphabet, Palitra L Publishing, 2012
- Three Tales for New Year, Publishing House Triasi,
- Digits in Motion, Palitra L Publishing, 2012
- A Merry Train, Palitra L Publishing, 2012
- The Adventure of Globus and Luka, Pegasi Publishing, 2011, ISBN 978-9941-9179-8-1
- Gio in Africa, Palitra L Publishing, 2011, ISBN 978-9941-413-59-9
- Three Under the Sun, Palitra L Publishing, 2011, ISBN 978-9941-192-44-9
- Kitchen Gardening in a War Zone, Shemecneba Publishing, 2010, ISBN 978-9941-9109-2-0
- Khachapuri, Palitra L Publishing, 2010
- CV, Shemecneba Publishing, 2009, ISBN 978-9941-9108-4-5
- Three of Us and the Angel, Bakur Sulakauri Publishing, 2007, ISBN 978-99940-998-9-4
- Flying, Publishing House Abuli, 2007, ISBN 978-99940-69-26-2
- Passions, Palitra L Publishing, 2006
- My Faraway I, Diogene Publishing House, 2005
- Until We are Summoned, Diogene Publishing House, 2003

=== Translations ===
- Dina Rubina — Petrushka's Syndrome, Tbilisi, Palitra L Publishing, 2017, ISBN 978-9941-24-883-2

=== Screenplays ===
- Vegetable garden in the conflict zone (2022), a drama film (1h 24m) directed by Beso Solomanashvili

== Prizes and awards ==
- Nominated for Astrid Lindgren Memorial Award 2015 for work dedicated to children
- "Literary Palette" magazine Prize of 2005 for the story Kitchen Gardening in a War Zone
- Literary Award SABA 2004 in the category The best Debut for the collection Until We are Summoned
- Winner of Kvali association competition in 2003 for the story A Two-Faced Day
