= Babilina Khositashvili =

Georgian poet and writer (1884–1973)

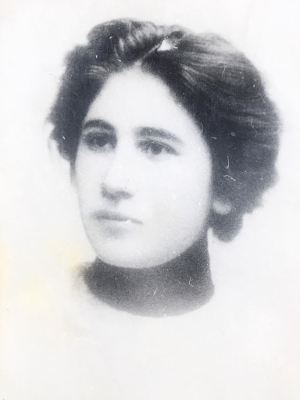
Babilina Khositashvili

Babilina Khositashvili (Georgian: ბაბილინა ხოსიტაშვილი; 1884– February 1973) was a Georgian poet, feminist and labour rights activist. After a short spell in a monastery, she moved to Tbilisi where, unable to afford higher education, she studied in the library. She found employment in a publishing house and began to write poetry, initially about the problems of the working class, later about love and women's constant struggle for enhancement. She also worked as a translator.

In 1921, by then married, she was able to embark on studies at the recently established Tbilisi University. On graduation, she undertook literary research over a period of four years but her work was not appreciated. Finding employment in a printing shop where she was able to observe the lives of workers, she developed an interest in the revolutionary movement. Later she turned to women's issues and feminism, concluding that women suffered from their lack of education and training. She became an active observer of the feminist movement, suffragism and world developments in women's emancipation.

== See also ==
- List of Georgian women writers
