= Elena Topuridze =

Georgian philosopher (1922–2004)

Elena Topuridze (Georgian: ელენე თოფურიძე; May 3, 1922 – September 29, 2004) was a prominent Georgian philosopher and writer. Born in Batumi, Georgia, her family moved to Tbilisi during her childhood. In 1945, she graduated from the faculty of philosophy of the M. V. Lomonosov Moscow State University. As a postgraduate student, Topuridze studied at the Institute of History of Art of Academy of Sciences of the USSR, in Moscow. In 1951, she returned to Tbilisi and took a position of professor at the Shota Rustaveli Theatrical Institute of Georgia. From 1961 to the end of her life she worked at S. Tsereteli Institute of Philosophy of Georgian National Academy of Sciences.

== Education and work ==
Topuridze held a Doctor of Philosophy (1951) and a Doctor of Science (1969) and was a prolific writer and a professor of philosophy, aesthetics, art, and history of Western European/American theatre and literature. She authored several works on influential figures in Italian art and philosophy: Benedetto Croce, Luigi Pirandello, and Eleonora Duse. In 1978, her work Aesthetics of Benedetto Croce was translated into Japanese and published in Tokyo. The problem of freedom and free choice was the main theme in her work Man in Classical Tragedy, which explored the origins of the idea of free will in the works of the ancient Greek poets.

== Publications ==
- Eleonora Duse, 1960, “Iskusstvo” (N.B. Polyakova, ed.), Moscow (in Russian);
- Aesthetics of Benedetto Croce, 1967, “Mecniereba” (N. Chavchavadze, ed.), Tbilisi (in Russian); 1978, “Origin”, Tokyo (in Japanese, translated by Isamu Taniguchi);
- Philosophical Concept of Luigi Pirandello, 1971, “Mecniereba” (N. Chavchavadze, ed.), Tbilisi (in Georgian);
- Man in Classical Tragedy, 1984, “Mecniereba” (N. Chavchavadze, ed.), Tbilisi (in Russian).
