= Mariam Khutsurauli =

Georgian poet and writer (born 1960)

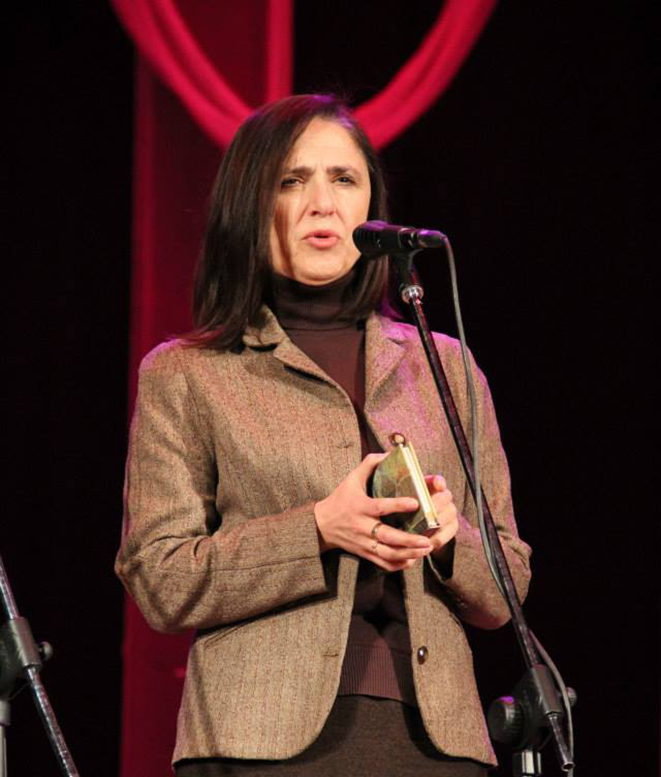
- Khutsurauli in 2017
- Born: 15 January 1960 (age 66); Telavi, Telavi Municipality, Georgia
- Occupations: Poet, short story writer
- Writing career
- Pen name: Sanata
- Genres: Poetry, short story
- Notable work: Sanata's book (2009)
- Literary movement: Modernism
- Website: armuri.georgianforum.com/t10-topic

Mariam Khutsurauli (IPA: [maɾiam χutsuɾauli]; Georgian: მარიამ ხუცურაული; born 15 January 1960) is a Georgian poet, writer and jurist.

== Biography ==
Mariam Khutsurauli (she is also known by her literary pseudonym Sanata) was born in Telavi, Georgia.

She graduated from the law department of Tbilisi State University in 1982. She worked as a lawyer for various state organizations in Georgia.

Khutsurauli's verses were published in the Georgian literary magazine Literaturuli Palitra (The Literary Palette) in 2011. She is the author of seven poetic and short story collections, edited by Miho Mosulishvili. Her poems have been translated into the English language by Manana Matiashvili.

As a poet, Khutsurauli writes remarkable verses in a dialect of Pshavi, which is a small historic region of northern Georgia. In her poems, it is possible to discover the original poetic world.

Songs by Teona Kumsiashvili "Rosa canina" and "On motive of Pshavi" based on Mariam Khutsurauli's verses became hits on social networks.

In 2011 Mariam Khutsurauri was the founder of Women's Literature Competition 'Khvaramzeoba'.

== Literary works ==
=== Books ===
- Sanata's book, Poems, 2009, ISBN 978-99940-60-64-1
- The book of Sanata, Poems, 2012, ISBN 978-9941-9260-8-2
- Sanata's House, Poems, 2012, ISBN 978-9941-9260-9-9
- Sanata's Chest, Short stories, 2012, ISBN 978-9941-9273-0-0
- The flower smiles in color of fire, Poems, 2016, ISBN 978-9941-469-01-5
- To mow near the sky, Short stories, 2016, ISBN 978-9941-469-00-8
- Through beams of diamonds, Audio-poems, 2016
- Salt To Taste, Short stories, 2020, ISBN 978-9941-32-090-3

=== Children's books ===
- A Girl Named Kesane Came with Her Spring, Short stories, 2020, ISBN 978-9941-32-413-0

== Awards ==
- Literary Award "Saba" in the nomination "The Best Criticism, Essayistic and Documentary Prose of the Year" for the book "Salt To Taste" (2021)

== Sources ==
- 'Who will play with me' by Mariam Khutsurauli
- Xucʻurauli, Mariam. Poems. Selections
- Mariam Khutsurauli on LinkedIn
