= Tamta Melashvili =

Georgian writer (born 1979)

- თამთა მელაშვილი
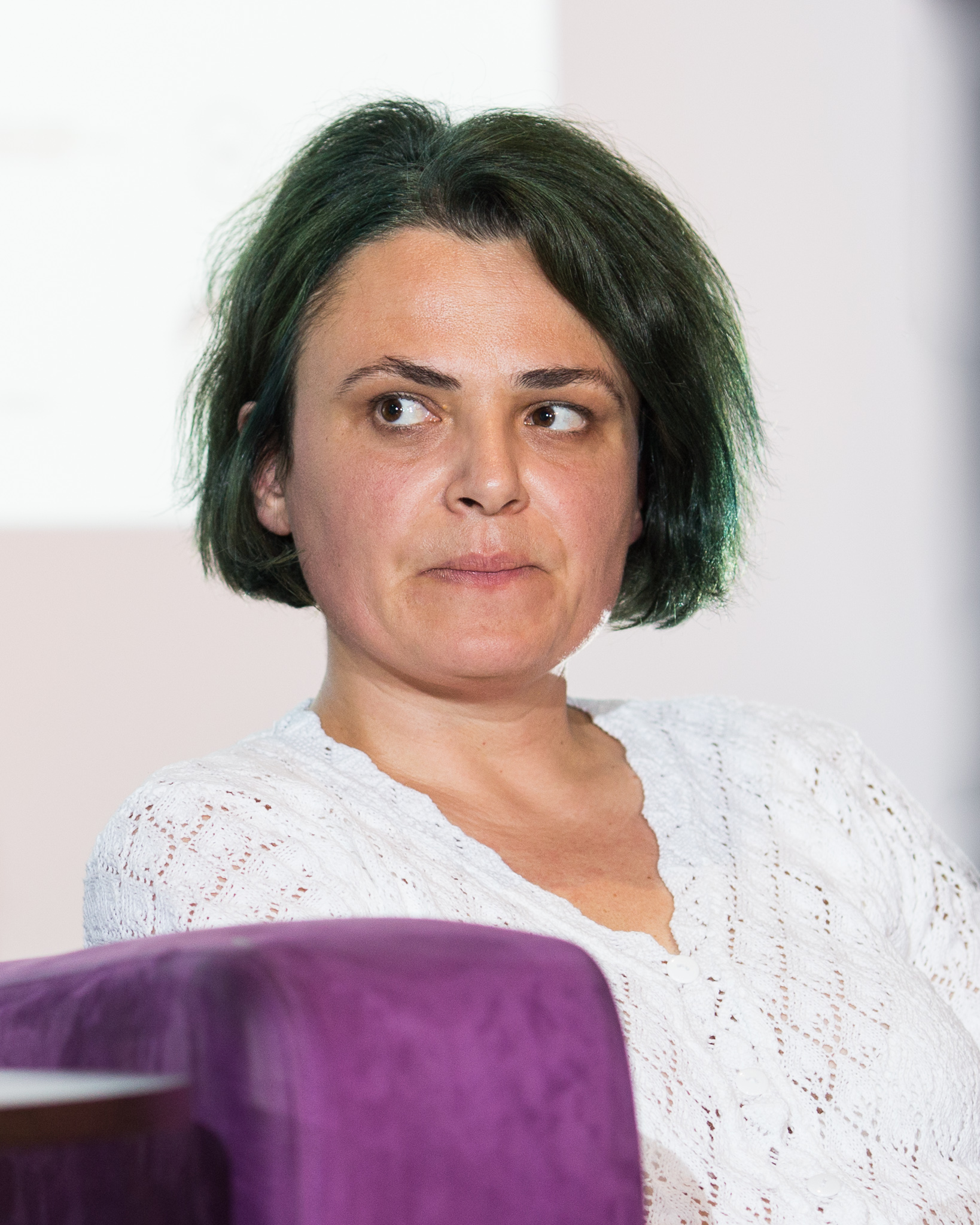
- Tamta Melashvili, 2017
- Born: 1979 (age 46–47); Ambrolauri, Georgia
- Occupation: Writer
- Writing career
- Movement: Postmodernism

Tamta Melashvili (Georgian: თამთა მელაშვილი; born 1979) is a Georgian writer and a feminist activist.

== Information ==
Tamta Melashvili currently lives in Tbilisi, Georgia, and works as a researcher and teacher at Tbilisi State University. She is a feminist activist and has background in Gender Studies (Central European University, Budapest). Her short stories first appeared online on literary web-sites and later were included in different fiction anthologies. In 2010 was published Tamta Melashvili's debut work Counting Out which quickly gained success. The novel was acclaimed by the critics as the work of "a new, highly distinctive voice" and won country's top Literary Award Saba in 2011. Following year Melashvili's work extended beyond Georgia and was nominated among the best ten in the 2012 Hotlist by Die Besten Bűcher aus Unäbhangigen Verlagen in Germany and won Deutscher Jugendliteraturpreis 2013 in young adult category. Counting Out is translated into German, Croatian, Russian, Albanian and English languages.

== Bibliography ==
- "Gatvla" – (Counting out) (2010)
- To the East, (2015, 2022)
- Blackbird Blackbird Blackberry, Sulakauri Ed., (2020)

=== Awards ===
- Committee Prize of the Literary Competition "Tsero" (Crane)
- German Youth Literature Prize for the book "გათვლა" (together with a translator, Natia Mikeladze-Bakhsoliani)
