= Irma Shiolashvili =

Georgian poet, translator and journalist

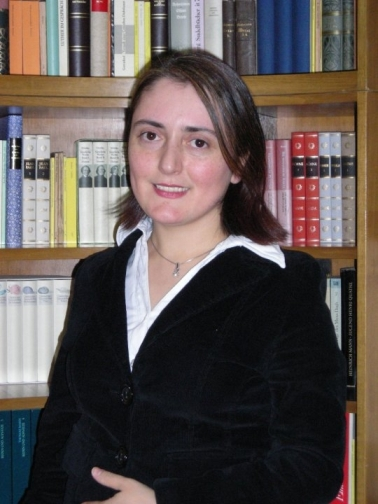
- Shiolashvili in 2014
- Born: Irma Shiolashvili; March 29, 1974 (age 52); Dedoplistsqaro, Georgia
- Occupations: Poet, translator
- Spouse: Joachim Britze
- Writing career
- Genre: Poetry
- Notable works: A Bridge of Colourful Leaves, 2009
- Literary movement: Modernism
- Website: armuri.4forum.biz/t831-irma-shiolashvili

Irma Shiolashvili, or Irma Shiolashvili-Britze (IPA: [iɾma ʃiolaʃʷili]; Georgian: ირმა შიოლაშვილი; born 29 March 1974 in Dedoplistsqaro) is a Georgian poet, translator and journalist.

== Biography ==
Irma Shiolashvili was born in 1974 in Dedoplistsqaro, Georgia. She studied journalism at Tbilisi State University and later at University of Bonn, Germany. During her studies in Tbilisi she worked in the cultural department of the National Georgian Television, where she produced TV programs about contemporary Georgian writers.

In 1995, she became one of the youngest members of the Georgian Writers' Union.

In 1999, Shiolashvili moved to Germany, where, in 2005, she defended PhD thesis on German and Georgian political postwar poetry.

In 2007, she was admitted to the European Writers' Association 'The Kogge'.

In 2012, her book A Bridge of colourful leaves was published in German translation by Pop Publishing House Ludwigsburg/Germany (Kaukasische Bibliothek, Volume 3). Her poems have been also translated into Russian, English and French.

Shiolashvili lives in Bonn and works as a journalist and lecturer.

== Works ==
=== Books ===
- Monday, Saunje Publishing, 2013, ISBN 978-9941-442-77-3
- A Bridge of Colourful Leaves, Editor Miho Mosulishvili, Saari Publishing, 2009, ISBN 978-99940-60-75-7
- Trace of Tears, Merani Publishing, 2002, ISBN 99928-946-0-1
- The Blue Bow, Mecniereba Publishing, 1996
- Non-existing Word, Merani Publishing, 1992

=== Translations ===
- Techno der Jaguare – Neue Erzählerinnen aus Georgien, Verlag Frankfurter Verlagsanstalt, 2013, ISBN 978-3627001926

== Prizes and awards ==
- Prize of the successful woman emigrant, Tbilisi, 2017

== Sources ==
- SHIOLASHVLI IRMA
- Two verses by Irma Shiolashvili, Translated into English by Manana Matiashvili and Dana Weber
- Irma Schiolaschwili (literatursalon-euterpe.de)
- Irma Schiolaschwili (wp.pop-verlag.com)
