= Dominika Eristavi =

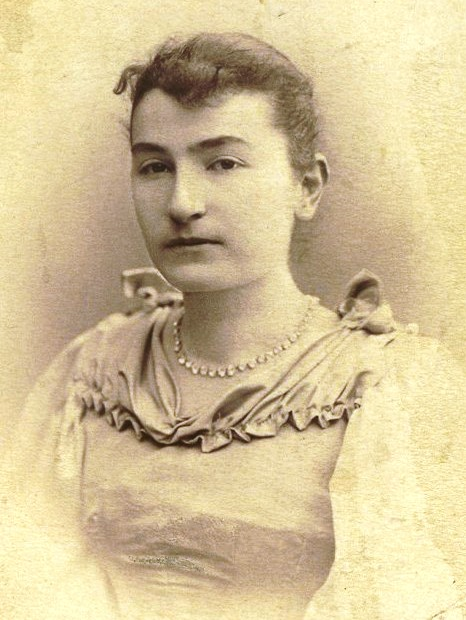
Domenika Eristavi

Dominika Eristavi (Georgian: დომინიკა ერისთავი), pen name Gandegili, (1864–1929) was a prominent Georgian writer and translator.

== Biography ==
Dominika Eristavi was born on 28 October 1864 in the Vani district. Her first poem titled "ბარათაშვილის ნეშთის გადმოსვენების გამო" (Baratashvili's Remains to be Reburied) was published in 1893 in the journal Iveria. She went on to contribute poetry and prose to a wide variety of periodicals and newspapers. Thanks to her competence in the Georgian language, in 1904 she was appointed editor of the magazine Nobati. In 1914, she was one of the founding members of the Georgian Women's Society. Her ability as a storyteller was recognized when her short story Marine was published in 1897. Eristavi also translated literary works by authors including Heinrich Heine, Ivan Turgenev and Maxim Gorky.

Under the pen-name Gandegili she published a collection of poems and short stories in 1910 and another collection of poems in 1918.

She was a strong defender of women's rights. Criticizing the absence of women at a meeting of cultural societies in 1916, she commented: "Georgian women have never failed to reveal if not higher at least equal capabilities with men in any field, but the meeting of cultural societies does not prove to be cultural enough to allocate a dignified place to a Georgian woman whom our ancestors appreciated much more than our contemporaries."

Dominika Eristavi died in Tbilisi on 24 January 1929.
