= Akaki Tsereteli =

Georgian poet and national liberation movement figure

Akaki
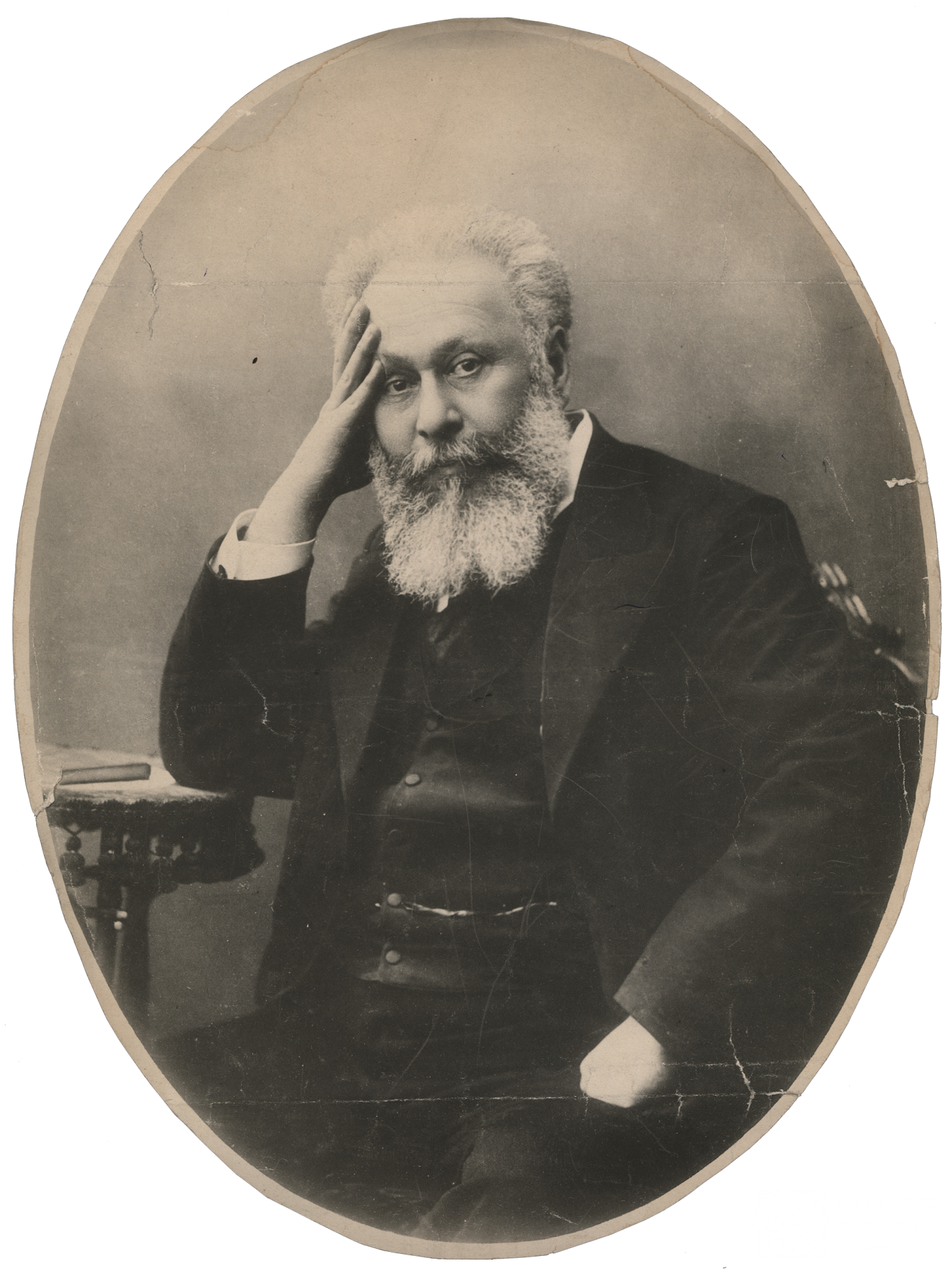
- Born: June 21, 1840; Skhvitori Imereti, Georgia (Country)
- Died: January 26, 1915 (aged 74)
- Resting place: Mtatsminda Pantheon
- Occupation: Poet
- Children: Alexey Tsereteli
- Writing career
- Notable works: Suliko; Gamzrdeli

Count Akaki Tsereteli (Georgian: აკაკი წერეთელი; 1840–1915), often mononymously known as Akaki, (Note: Sometimes mistakenly rendered in Russian as Akakiy. Georgian spelling Akaki and Russian spelling Akakiy are both derived from the Greek name Akakios/Acacius, anglicanized as Agathius) was a prominent Georgian poet and national liberation movement figure.

== Early life and education ==
Tsereteli was born in the village of Skhvitori, Imereti region of western Georgia on June 9, 1840, to a prominent Georgian aristocratic family. His father was Prince Rostom Tsereteli, his mother, Princess Ekaterine, a daughter of Ivane Abashidze and a great-granddaughter of King Solomon I of Imereti.

Following an old family tradition, Tsereteli spent his childhood years living with a peasant’s family in the village of Savane. He was brought up by peasant nannies, all of which made him feel empathy for the peasants’ life in Georgia. He graduated from the Kutaisi Classical Gymnasium in 1852 and the University of Saint Petersburg Faculty of Oriental Languages in 1863.

== Career and legacy ==
Tsereteli was a close friend of Ilia Chavchavadze, a Georgian progressive intellectual youth leader. The young adult generation of Georgians during the 1860s, led by Chavchavdze and Tsereteli, protested against the Tsarist regime and campaigned for cultural revival and self-determination of the Georgians.

He is an author of hundreds of patriotic, historical, lyrical and satiric poems, also humoristic stories and autobiographic novel. Tsereteli was also active in educational, journalistic and theatrical activities.

The famous Georgian folk song Suliko is based on Tsereteli’s lyrics. He died on January 26, 1915, and was buried at the Mtatsminda Pantheon in Tbilisi. He had a son, Russian opera impresario Alexey Tsereteli. A major boulevard in the city of Tbilisi is named after him, as is one of Tbilisi's metro stations.

Tsereteli is known for his Armenophobia. He attacked Armenians for their perceived mercantilism and portrayed them as a flea sucking Georgian blood in one fable.

During the Russo-Japanese War (1904–1905), Akaki Tsereteli with the rest of the Georgian national movement celebrated Japan's victory through allegorical poetry designed to evade Russian censorship. In April 1905, Tsereteli published the poem Gurian Nana in the newspaper Iveria. Presented as a lullaby dedicated to a newborn child, the poem ends each stanza with the phrase "Oi amas venatsvale" ("I cherish this one" or "God bless this one"). However, the phrase "Oi amas" ("this one") also phonetically echoes the name of Ōyama Iwao, the Japanese commander, allowing the poem to covertly praise and glorify him. The motif of the newborn child further serves as an allegory for Japan itself — a young and rising power on the world stage.

Tsereteli translated The Internationale into Georgian in 1906.

== See also ==
- Aneta Dadeshkeliani
- Tsereteli
- Tsereteli (Tbilisi Metro)

== Bibliography ==
- Georgian Information Portal biography
- Donald Rayfield (2000), The Literature of Georgia: A History, pp. 159–168: "The luminaries: Ilia Chavchavadze & Akaki Tsereteli", ISBN 0-7007-1163-5.
- Tsereteli, Akaki (2012). The Story of My Life. Translated by Rayfield, Donald. Ilia State University Press. ISBN 978-9941-18-103-0.
