= Kato Mikeladze =

Georgian journalist and feminist

- ეკატერინე მიქელაძე
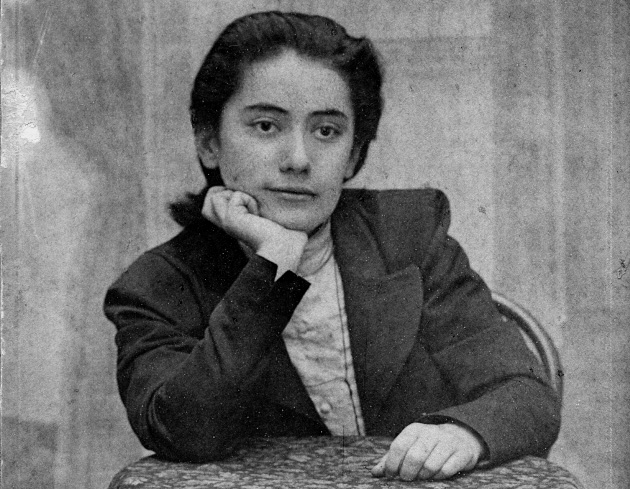
- Kato Mikeladze in Paris, 1909
- Born: Ekaterine Mikeladze; 18 September 1878; Kutaisi, Russian Empire (now Georgia)
- Died: 1942 (aged 63–64); Tbilisi, Georgian SSR, Soviet Union
- Education: Free University of Brussels
- Occupations: Journalist, writer, feminist activist
- Known for: Pioneer of the women's rights movement in Georgia
- Movement: Feminism, women's suffrage movement

Ekaterine "Kato" Mikeladze (Georgian: კატო (ეკატერინე) მიქელაძე; 18 September 1878 – 1942) was a Georgian journalist and feminist who from 1916 fought for women's rights. In order to encourage women to become politically active, she established The Inter-Partial League of Women backed by The Voice of Georgian Women, a newspaper she founded and edited, publishing articles on social and political issues. Thanks to her efforts, in 1919 five women were among the elected members of Georgia's parliament following the country's first democratic election.

== Biography ==
Born in 1878 in Kutaisi, Mikeladze completed her school education at the city's St. Nino School. In 1898, already a committed feminist, she responded to assertions of women's limited intelligence by commenting in the journal Kvali: "The [emancipation] movement will continue until the root causes are eradicated. Science shows the causes of economic and political inequality do not result from inequality in ability or intelligence." She went on to study in Moscow (1903) and in Brussels, graduating in Social and Political Sciences.

She then spent several years in Paris where she followed developments in women's involvement in politics, including the activities of the British National Union of Women's Suffrage Societies and Women's Social and Political Union. Back in Kutaisi in 1916, she strove to improve women's participation in politics by establishing the Inter-Partial League of Women and The Voice of Georgian Women, a newspaper promoting the social and political views of women from Georgia and elsewhere in Europe.

== Legacy ==
In 2013 the Women's Fund in Georgia established the Kato Mikeladze Award to recognize the work of women's rights activists in the country.

== See also ==
- List of Georgian women writers
