= Georgian literature =

Georgian literature (Georgian: ქართული ლიტერატურა) refers to a long literary heritage, with some of the oldest surviving texts in Georgian language dating back to the 5th century. A golden age of Georgian literature flourished under the unified kingdom of David IV in the 11th century. However, political fragmentation and foreign invasions following a peak in literary tradition during the reign of Queen Tamar (1184–1213 CE) led to a cultural decline.

== History ==
=== Early origins ===
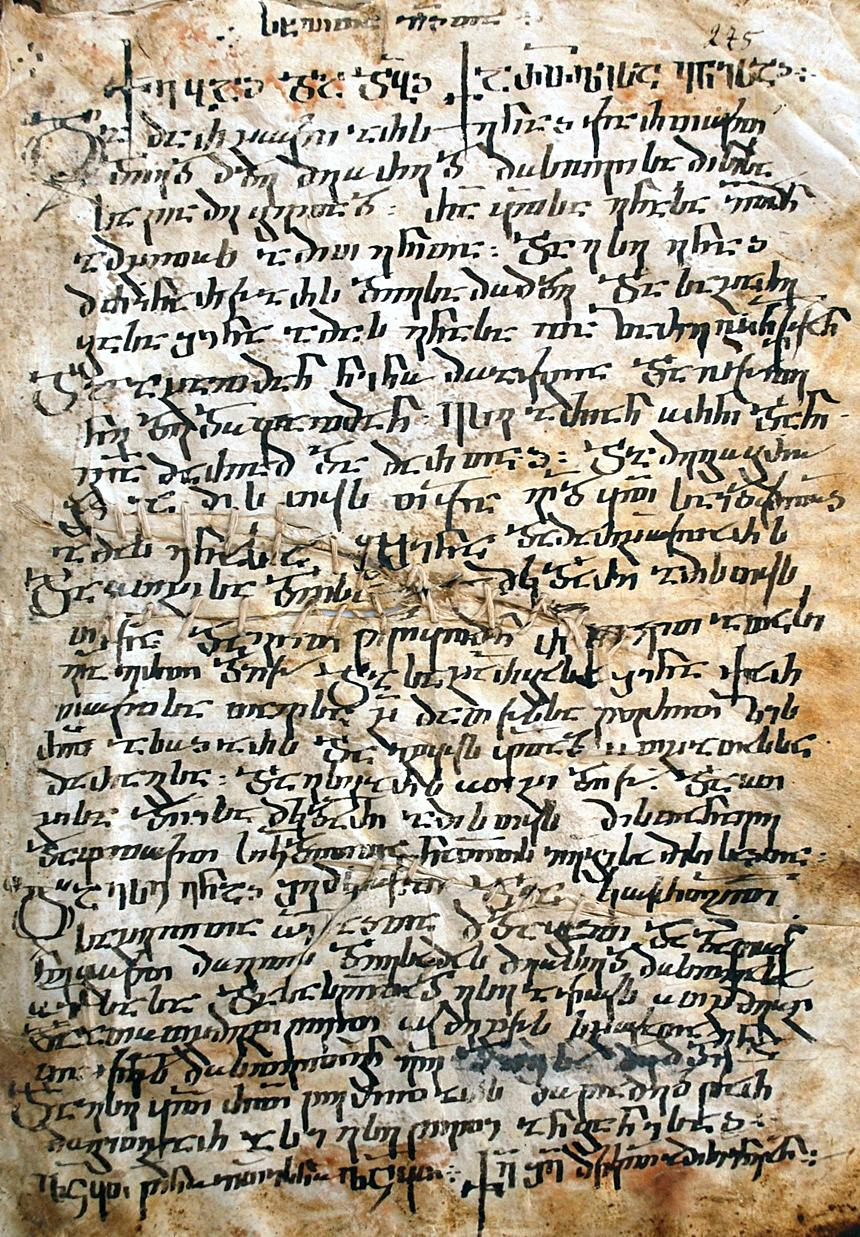
A 10th-century manuscript of John Zosimus in medieval Georgian patristic Nuskhuri script.

The earliest known Georgian literary work, The Martyrdom of the Holy Queen Shushanik by Iakob Tsurtaveli, was composed between 476 and 484 CE. It belongs to the genre of hagiographies.

In the 9th and 10th centuries, Christian theological literature flourished alongside a growing sense of Georgian national identity, exemplified by "Praise and Exaltation of the Georgian Language" by John Zosimus.

=== Georgian Golden Age (11th–13th centuries) ===
Shota Rustaveli (c. 1160 – after c. 1220), poet and author of "The Knight in the Panther's Skin", a national epic poem

David IV's unification of Georgia in the 11th century ushered in a golden age for culture. Christian literature thrived, heavily influenced by Byzantine traditions. Numerous Byzantine works were translated into Georgian, and philosophy and historical writing flourished.

This era also saw the birth of secular literature, drawing inspiration from Georgian folklore as well as Persian and Arabic literary traditions. Heroic epics, tales of chivalrous love, and knightly adventures became prominent, with poetry reigning as the dominant literary genre.

The reign of Queen Tamar (AD 1184-1213) marked the pinnacle of medieval Georgian literature. This period witnessed a flourishing of literary production, with Shota Rustaveli's epic poem, "The Knight in the Panther's Skin" (Vepkhistqaosani), emerging as a masterpiece. Considered one of the most significant works of Georgian literature, the poem narrates the adventures of Avtandil, a knight sent by Queen Tinatin on a quest to find another mysterious knight. The story unfolds with twists, culminating in a double wedding.

Following Queen Tamar's reign, Georgia's political fragmentation and foreign invasions led to a decline in literary output.

=== Resurgence (17th–18th centuries) ===
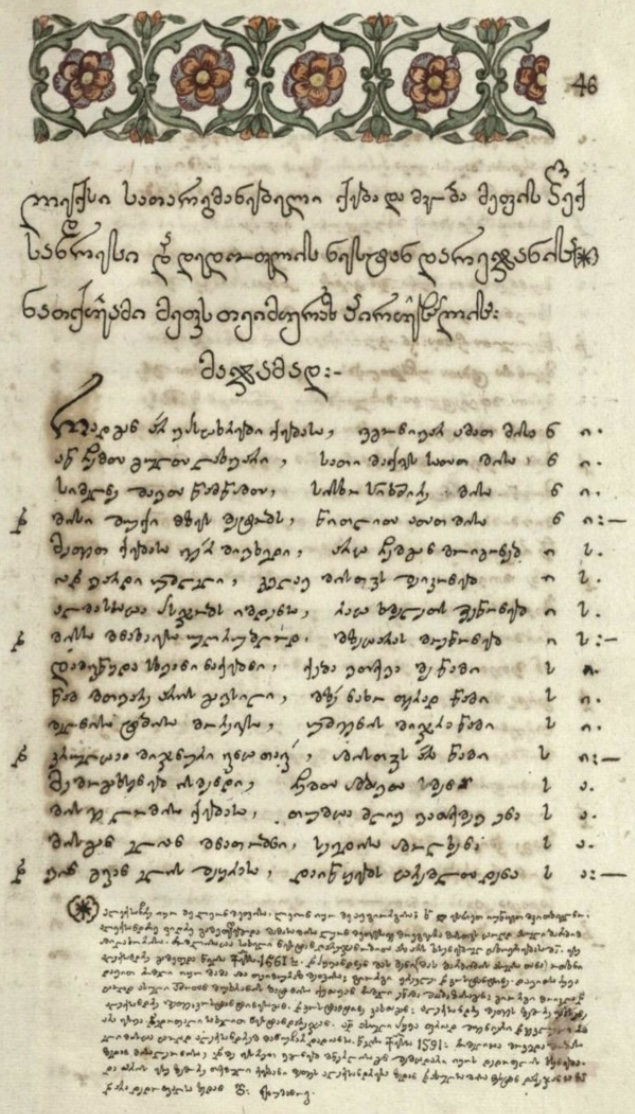
Poem by Teimuraz I.

The 17th and 18th centuries saw a resurgence in literary activity. Kings like Teimuraz I and Archil II contributed to the field. This period produced notable works like The Book of Wisdom and Lies by Sulkhan-Saba Orbeliani, alongside works by David Guramishvili and Bessarion Gabashvili. Themes of a suffering homeland and grief resonated during this era. Despite Persian oppression, Georgian authors often displayed admiration for Persian language and poetry.

=== Westernization and Romanticism (19th Century) ===
The 19th century marked a shift towards Western influence as Georgia gradually joined the Russian Empire. Romanticism became the dominant style, with leading poets like Alexander Chavchavadze, Grigol Orbeliani, and Nikoloz Baratashvili shaping the era.

The next generation saw a rise in nationalism and a growing focus on social issues. The "Tergdaleulebi" movement, advocating education and reform, led by Russian-educated Georgians, heavily influenced literature. Realism gained prominence, with writers like Ilia Chavchavadze, Akaki Tsereteli, Alexandre Kazbegi, and Vazha-Pshavela drawing inspiration from both Russian and Western European literature.

=== 20th century: revolution, repression, and rebirth ===
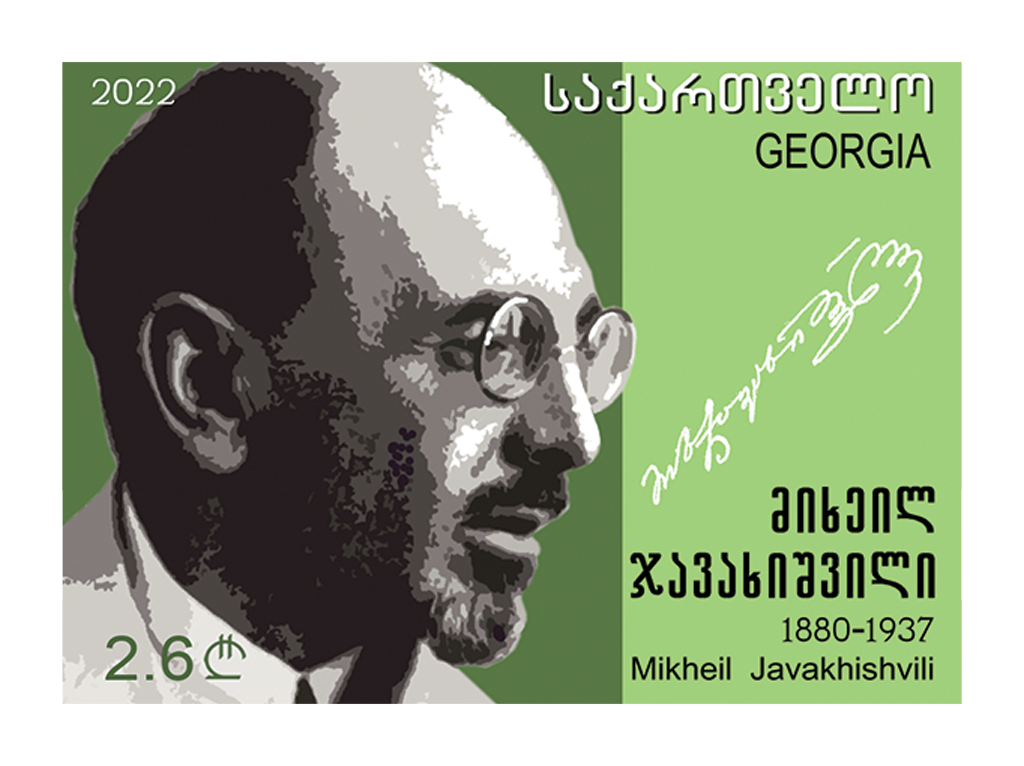
Mikheil Javakhishvili on a 2022 stamp of Georgia

The early 20th century witnessed a flourishing of literary styles and authors. This vibrancy continued until the Stalinist purges of the 1930s, which tragically silenced many writers unwilling to conform to socialist realism.

In the early 20th century, Kutaisi became a center for the symbolist "Blue Horns" group, including Paolo Iashvili, Grigol Robakidze, Giorgi Leonidze, Titsian Tabidze and Galaktion Tabidze.

Mikheil Javakhishvili, Konstantine Gamsakhurdia, Nodar Dumbadze and Otar Chiladze are considered the 20th century's most influential prose writers.

== See also ==
- List of Georgian writers
- List of libraries in Georgia (country)

== Sources ==
- Baramidze, A.; Radiani, Sh.; Zgenti, V. (1952). История грузинской литературы [History of Georgian Literature] (in Russian). Moscow: Uchpedgiz.
- Baramidze, A. G. (1984). "Грузинская литература [V—XIII вв.]" [Georgian Literature of the 5th-13th Centuries]. История всемирной литературы [History of World Literature] (in Russian). Vol. 2. Moscow: Gorky Institute of World Literature. pp. 308–319.
- Baramidze, A. G. (1985). "Грузинская литература [XIII—XVI вв.]" [Georgian Literature of the 13th-17th Centuries]. История всемирной литературы [History of World Literature] (in Russian). Vol. 3. Moscow: Gorky Institute of World Literature. pp. 536–538.
- Baramidze, A. G. (1987). "Грузинская литература [XVII в.]" [Georgian Literature of the 17th Century]. История всемирной литературы [History of World Literature] (in Russian). Vol. 4. Moscow: Gorky Institute of World Literature. pp. 429–435.
- Baramidze, A. G. (1988). "Грузинская литература [XVIII в.]" [Georgian Literature of the 18th Century]. История всемирной литературы [History of World Literature] (in Russian). Vol. 5. Moscow: Gorky Institute of World Literature. pp. 505–513.
- Asatiani, G. L.; Abashidze, G. E. (1989). "Грузинская литература [первой половины XIX в.]" [Georgian Literature of the 1st half of the 19th Century]. История всемирной литературы [History of World Literature] (in Russian). Vol. 6. Moscow: Gorky Institute of World Literature. pp. 438–447.
- Khutsishvili, S. G. (1991). "Грузинская литература [второй половины XIX в.]" [Georgian Literature of the 2nd half of the 19th Century]. История всемирной литературы [History of World Literature] (in Russian). Vol. 7. Moscow: Gorky Institute of World Literature. pp. 202–208.
- Merkviladze, G. I. (1994). "Грузинская литература [на рубеже XIX и ХХ веков]" [Georgian Literature at the edge of the 19th and 20th Centuries]. История всемирной литературы [History of World Literature] (in Russian). Vol. 8. Moscow: Gorky Institute of World Literature. pp. 167–173.
