= Kolau Nadiradze =

Georgian poet

Kolau Nadiradze (Georgian: კოლაუ ნადირაძე; 8 March 1895 – 28 October 1990) was a Georgian poet and the last representative of Georgian Symbolist school.

Born in Kutaisi, Georgia (then part of the Russian Empire), Nadiradze studied law at the University of Moscow from 1912 to 1916.

Upon his return to Georgia, he became a founding member of the Georgian Symbolist group Tsisperqantselebi (Georgian: ცისფერყანწელები) or 'Blue Horns' in 1915, with fellow writers Grigol Robakidze, Titsian Tabidze, Paolo Iashvili and Valerian Gaprindashvili, amongst others. Nadiradze quickly came under the influence of modernism, particularly Émile Verhaeren, and emerged as one of the leading figures within the Blue Horns group.

His early Symbolist poetry was marked by a mystic aesthete with a notably critical and hopeless vision of pre-independence Georgia. His first poem published by the Blue Horn Journal, Dreaming of Georgia (ოცნება საქართველოზე), 1916, for instance, described a withered Georgian landscape of decrepit homes and crumbling ruins. Prior to Georgia's brief independence (1918–1921) Nadiraze described the country as an 'idiot homeland, with a thankless task/ Aged, oppressed and tortured'

In 1921, the Red Army invaded Georgia and established a Soviet state. Since Nadiradze's earlier writings were not overtly political, he was able to adapt to the Communist ideological requirements more easily than others of the Blue Horn group, and continued to produce poetry. Under the Soviet Union, Nadiradze chiefly wrote patriotic poetry and prose, with a focus on realism and social issues. He also made numerous translations of literary works, including Pushkin, Bunin, Balmont, Blok, Verlaine and Isahakyan.

Despite Nadiradze's adherence to the regime, he was arrested along with the fellow symbolist writer Sergo Kldiashvili in the purge of 1937, although both poets escaped imprisonment when their NKVD interrogator was himself arrested and their files mislaid. The incident caused Nadiradze to distance himself further from old writers of the Blue Horn group, and he would be the last surviving member. In the summer of 1937, Nadiradze had been the only writer to attend the funeral of Paolo Iashvili, in defiance of Iashvili having been ostracized after his demonstrative suicide at the writer's House of Georgia.

In the perestroika years, already in his nineties, his poem 25 February 1921, which describes Red Army invasion of Georgia as tragedy to Georgia, was accidentally ended in 1985 book Poet's thousand strings. This book contained poems of 13 poets who started their activity in 1910-20s, including Nadiradze. At start of each poet's approximately thousand strings, there was cliche of poet's manuscript, with poem and poet's signature. All of manuscripts, including Nadiradze's, were taken from Literature Museum of Georgia, although Nadiradze was alive. Manuscript of Nadiradze contained this upper-mentioned anti-Soviet poem, which is regarded as well-known poem in present Georgia.

Because of this "mistake", management of publishing house of Poet's thousand strings was fired, along with an employee of MTAVLIT, a soviet censure organ, who approved this version of the book. Pages in remaining copies containing 25 February were cut and replaced with "corrected" version. Nadiradze had threat of firing from Writers Union of Georgia. He lied that this poem didn't represent his actual opinions. Because of this "apologize" and his age, Nadiradze remained in organization. In reality, he had nostalgy of independent Georgia, as noted in memories of Nadiradze's friend, Nino Ckhikvishvili, and this poem really represented his opinion, unlike his Soviet-adhering poems.

== See also ==
- Georgia
- Censorship in the Soviet Union
