= Kldiashvili =

Kldiashvili (Georgian: კლდიაშვილი) is a Georgian surname, originally from the province of Imereti. Formerly, the Kldiashvili were listed among the gentry (aznauri) and recognized as such in the Russian Empire in the 19th century.

Notable people with the name include:

- David Kldiashvili (1862–1931), a Georgian writer
- Sergo Kldiashvili (1893–1986), a Georgian writer
- Simon Kldiashvili (1865–1920), a Georgian architect
