= Simon Chikovani =

Georgian poet

Simon Ivanes dze Chikovani
- სიმონ ჩიქოვანი
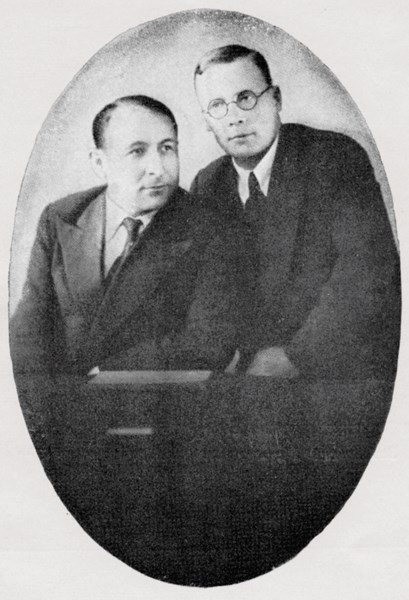
- Simon Chikovani (left) and Nikolai Zabolotsky
- Born: December 27, 1902
- Died: April 24,1966 (aged 63)
- Education: Tbilisi State University
- Occupation: Poet

Simon Ivanes dze Chikovani (Georgian: სიმონ ჩიქოვანი; 27 December 1902 – 24 April 1966) was a prominent Georgian poet. He set out to be the leader of the Georgian Futurist movement and ended up as a Soviet establishment figure.

== Early life and career ==
Born near the town Abasha, he was educated at the Kutaisi Realschule and Tbilisi State University from which he graduated in 1922. As a teenager, he was associated with the Blue Horns, a group of young Georgian Symbolists. Although he stood far from any “proletarian” thematic, he joined the nascent "Left" poets and became their spokesman. In 1924, was arrested and nearly shot on a walking-tour to Kakheti during the Red Terror that followed the Georgian rebellion against the Soviet rule. Between 1924 and 1929, he produced two series of poems (ფიქრები მტკვრის პირას ["The Thought at the Mtkvari"], 1925; მხოლოდ ლექსები ["Only Poems"], 1930) that earned him a reputation of one of the most original Georgian poets of the 20th century. In the words of modern British scholar Donald Rayfield, "most are energetic and provocative Whitmanesque heckling and satirising of the older generation of poets: Chikovani sported Mayakovsky’s mantle." Since 1924, he edited the notorious Futurist journal H_{2}SO_{4} and directed his attacks against his former associates from the Blue Horns group, chiefly Titsian Tabidze and Paolo Iashvili.

== Later years and turn to politics ==
From 1930 onward, he distanced himself from his innovative Futurism and brought his work more in line with ideologically-sanctioned patriotic lyrics and love-poetry, suppressing all reference to his versatile early work, especially during the 1937 Great Purge, in which his brother was shot. He went on to serve as a secretary of the Georgian Union of Writers from 1930 to 1932, its president from 1944 to 1951, and finally as deputy of the Supreme Soviet from 1950 to 1954.

There are streets named after Simon Chikovani in Tbilisi and Kutaisi.

== See also ==
- List of Georgian writers
