= Presidential Order of Excellence =

Award conferred by the President of Georgia

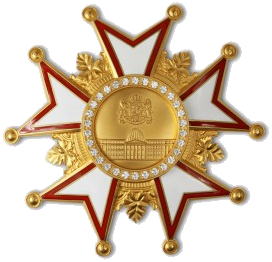
- Awarded for: Honoring significant achievements in the relevant fields of social life and meritorious service for Georgia.
- Country: (Georgia (country)) Georgia
- Presented by: President of Georgia
- First award: 2010

The Presidential Order of Excellence is an award given by the President of Georgia to individuals in culture, education, science, art, sport, and other fields, for significant achievements and meritorious service for Georgia.

The award was established on July 31, 2009 by the Parliament of Georgia and is accompanied by an additional monetary award of 1,000 Georgian lari.

== Recipients ==
=== Individuals awarded in 2010 ===
In 2010, the Presidential Order of Excellence was awarded by President Mikheil Saakashvili to 55 individuals. These included the Patriarch of Georgia Ilia II, Guram Dochanashvili, Iliko Sukhishvili, Ekaterine Meiering-Mikadze, Davit Darchiashvili, Roland Akhalaia, Mamuka Khazaradze, Nino Ananiashvili, Nani Bregvadze, Paata Burchuladze, Iulon Gagoshidze, Vladimer Gurgenidze, Niaz Diasamidze, Irakli Ezugbaia, Nikoloz Vacheishvili, Ekaterine Zghuladze, Ramaz Nikolaishvili, Nino Sukhishvili, Ilia Sukhishvili, and Jemal Tchkuaseli.

=== Individuals awarded in 2011 ===
In 2011, the Presidential Order of Excellence was awarded by President Mikheil Saakashvili to 35 individuals. These included Igor Kokoskov, Giorgi Nizharadze, Gela Charkviani, James Richard Dixon, Éric Fournier Nino Katamadze, Tamar Kovziridze, Sergi Kapanadze, Raphaël Glucksmann, Kakha Baindurashvili, Giorgi Vashadze, Davit Sakvarelidze, and Viktor Yushchenko.

=== Individuals awarded in 2012 ===
In 2012, the Presidential Order of Excellence was awarded to by President Mikheil Saakashvili 43 individuals. These included Zaza Korinteli, Giorgi Ushikishvili, Davit Gogichaishvili, Donald Trump, Temur Iakobishvili, Levan Varshalomidze, and Tsezar Chocheli.

=== Individuals awarded in 2013 ===
In 2013, the Presidential Order of Excellence was awarded by President Mikheil Saakashvili and President Giorgi Margvelashvili to 154 individuals. These included Akaki Bobokhidze, Urszula Doroszewska, Vitali Klitschko, Zaal Udumashvili, Akaki Gogichaishvili, Giorgi Liponava, Pavle Kublashvili, Nika Tabatadze, Davit Kikalishvili, Zurab Chiaberashvili, Eldar Shengelaia, Natia Bandzeladze, Irma Nadirashvili, Zaal Samadashvili, Nika Gvaramia, Davit Kirkitadze, Bayar Shahin, Alexander Lukashenko, Viktor Yanukovych, Serzh Sargsyan, Almazbek Atambayev, Islam Karimov, Mehriban Aliyeva, Donald Tusk, Manana Manjgaladze, Zurab Darchiashvili, Iakob Zakareishvili, Giorgi Tughushi, Shota Malashkhia, Giorgi Karbelashvili, Giorgi Kandelaki, and Aleksadre Kvitashvili.

=== Individuals awarded in 2014 ===
In 2014, the Presidential Order of Excellence was awarded by President Giorgi Margvelashvili to 4 individuals. These were Lavrenti Managadze, Sheikh-ul-Islam Gaji Allahshukur Pasha-Zade, Jamlet Khukhashvili, and Roman Shakarishvili.

=== Individuals awarded in 2015 ===
In 2015, the Presidential Order of Excellence was awarded by President Giorgi Margvelashvili to 5 individuals. These were Givi Margvelashvili, Nona Gaprindashvili, Mikhail Yakobus Lentz, Avtandil Kvezereli-Kopadze, and Nodar Tsintsadze.

=== Individuals awarded in 2016 ===
In 2016, the Presidential Order of Excellence was awarded by President Giorgi Margvelashvili to individuals including Professor Givi Ghambashidze, Olympic wrestling champions Vladimer Khinchegashvili and Lasha Talakhadze, and posthumously awarded diplomats Revaz Adamia, Giorgi Burduli, and Levan Melikidze.

=== Individuals awarded in 2017 ===
In 2017, the Presidential Order of Excellence was awarded by President Giorgi Margvelashvili to individuals.

=== Individuals awarded in 2018 ===
As part of Georgia's 100th anniversary, President Giorgi Margvelashvili awarded the Presidential Order of Excellence to 23 Olympic champions for their achievements in sports and contributions to the worldwide promotion of Georgia. These individuals were:

- Alexander Anpilogov – Olympic champion in handball
- Giorgi Asanidze - Olympic champion in weightlifting
- Vakhtang Blagidze - Olympic champion in Greco-Roman wrestling
- Davit Gobejishvili - Olympic champion in free wrestling
- Vladimer Gogoladze - Olympic champion in sports gymnastics
- Zurab Zviadauri - Olympic champion in Judo
- Levan Tediashvili - two-time Olympic champion in free wrestling
- Vazha Kacharava - Olympic champion in volleyball
- Gela Ketashvili - Olympic champion in football
- Kakhi Kakhiashvili – three-time Olympic champion in weightlifting
- Manuchar Kvirkvelia - Olympic champion in Greco-Roman wrestling
- Ketevan Losaberidze - Olympic champion in archery
- Revaz Mindorashvili - Olympic champion in free wrestling
- Roman Rurua - Olympic champion in Greco-Roman wrestling
- Nino Salukvadze – Olympic champion in shooting
- Viktor Saneev - three-time Olympic champion in athletics
- Robert Shavlakadze - Olympic champion in athletics
- Lasha Shavdatuashvili - Olympic champion in Judo
- Raphael Chimishkyan - Olympic champion in weightlifting
- Irakli Tsirekidze - Olympic champion in Judo
- Leri Khabelov – Olympic champion in free wrestling
- Shota Khabareli - Olympic champion in Judo
- Davit Khakhaleishvili - Olympic champion in Judo

=== Heads of state awarded ===
Several current and former heads of state have been awarded the Presidential Order Excellence, including

- Viktor Yushchenko, 3rd President of Ukraine, awarded in 2011
- Donald Trump, 45th and 47th President of the United States, awarded in 2012
- Alexander Lukashenko, 1st President of Belarus, awarded in 2013
- Viktor Yanukovych, 4th President of Ukraine, awarded in 2013
- Serzh Sargsyan, 3rd President of Armenia, awarded in 2013
- Almazbek Atambayev, 4th President of Kyrgyzstan, awarded in 2013
- Islam Karimov, 1st President of Uzbekistan. awarded in 2013

== See also ==
- Orders, decorations, and medals of Georgia
- Presidential Medal of Freedom
