= Galaktion Tabidze =

Georgian poet

Galaktioni
- გალაკტიონი
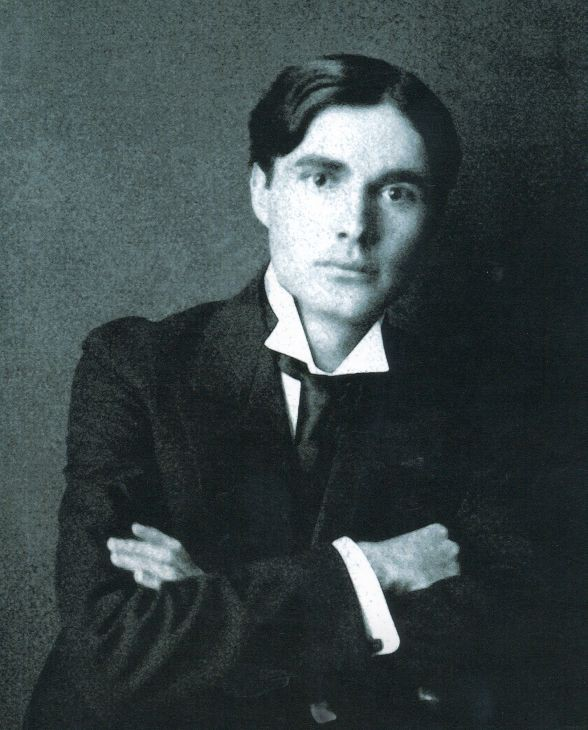
- Born: გალაკტიონ ტაბიძე Galaktion Tabidze; November 17, 1892; Chqvishi, Kutais Governorate, Russian Empire
- Died: March 17, 1959 (aged 66); Tbilisi, Georgian SSR, Soviet Union
- Resting place: Mtatsminda Pantheon
- Spouse: Olga Okujava
- Writing career
- Language: Georgian
- Genre: Modernism Symbolism
- Notable work: crane aux fleurs artistiques [1919 Collection]

Galaktion Tabidze (Georgian: გალაკტიონ ტაბიძე), simply referred to as Galaktioni (Georgian: გალაკტიონი), (November 17, 1892 – March 17, 1959), was a Georgian poet of the twentieth century whose writings profoundly influenced all subsequent generations of Georgian poets. He survived Joseph Stalin's Great Purge of the 1930s, which claimed the lives of many of his fellow writers, friends and relatives, but came under heavy pressure from the Soviet authorities. Those years plunged him into depression and alcoholism. He was placed in a psychiatric hospital in Tbilisi, where he committed suicide.

== Biography ==
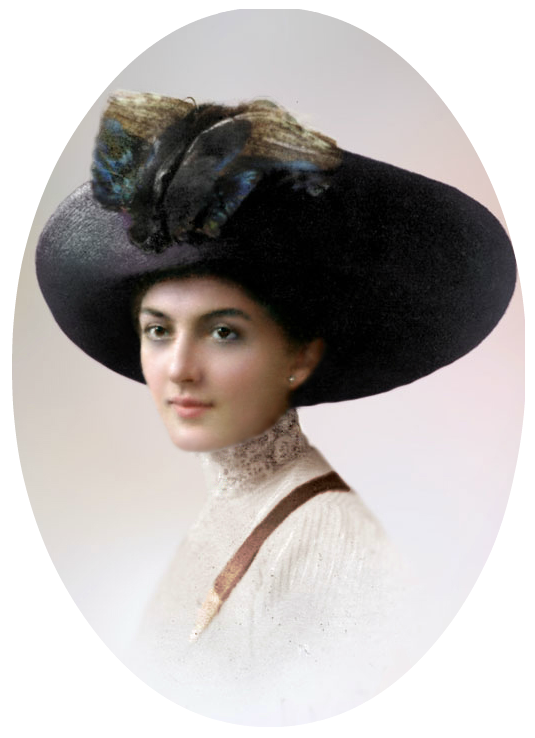
Princess Mary is often thought to be Galaktion's muse. (1911)

Galaktion Tabidze was born in the village Chqvishi near Vani, western Georgia (then part of Imperial Russia). His father, local teacher Vasil Tabidze, died two months before Galaktion was born. From 1900 to 1910, he studied at the seminaries of Kutaisi and at Tiflis Theological Seminary (modern Tbilisi), and later worked as a teacher. Although his very first book, influenced by Symbolism, garnered acclaim in 1914, he took longer than the other Georgian symbolists from the Blue Horns group to attract recognition. Due to his preference for solitude, he gained the moniker of "Chevalier of the Order of Loneliness" from his cousin Titsian Tabidze.

His next poetic collection Crâne aux fleurs artistiques (1919) made him the leader of Georgian poetry for several decades to come. Most of his writings were impregnated with themes of isolation, lovelessness, and nightmarish presentiments, as seen in his masterpieces "Without Love" (1913), "I and the Night" (1913), "Azure Horses" (1915), and "The Wind Blows" (1924).

During the repressions of 1937, Tabidze's wife Olga Okudzhava, from a family of Old Bolsheviks, was arrested and later executed with other inmates of Oryol Prison in Medvedev Forest massacre in 1941. Galaktion’s cousin and fellow poet, Titsian Tabidze, like many of the poet’s associates, was also arrested and eventually executed. Tabidze himself was interrogated and savagely tortured by KGB Chief Lavrentiy Beria. This plunged Galaktion into depression and alcoholism. His long silence and solitude saved him from the purges however; he continued to receive titles and awards, and published new poems, but the poet’s life was completely distorted.

He was a recipient of the Order of Lenin and the Order of the Red Banner of Labour.

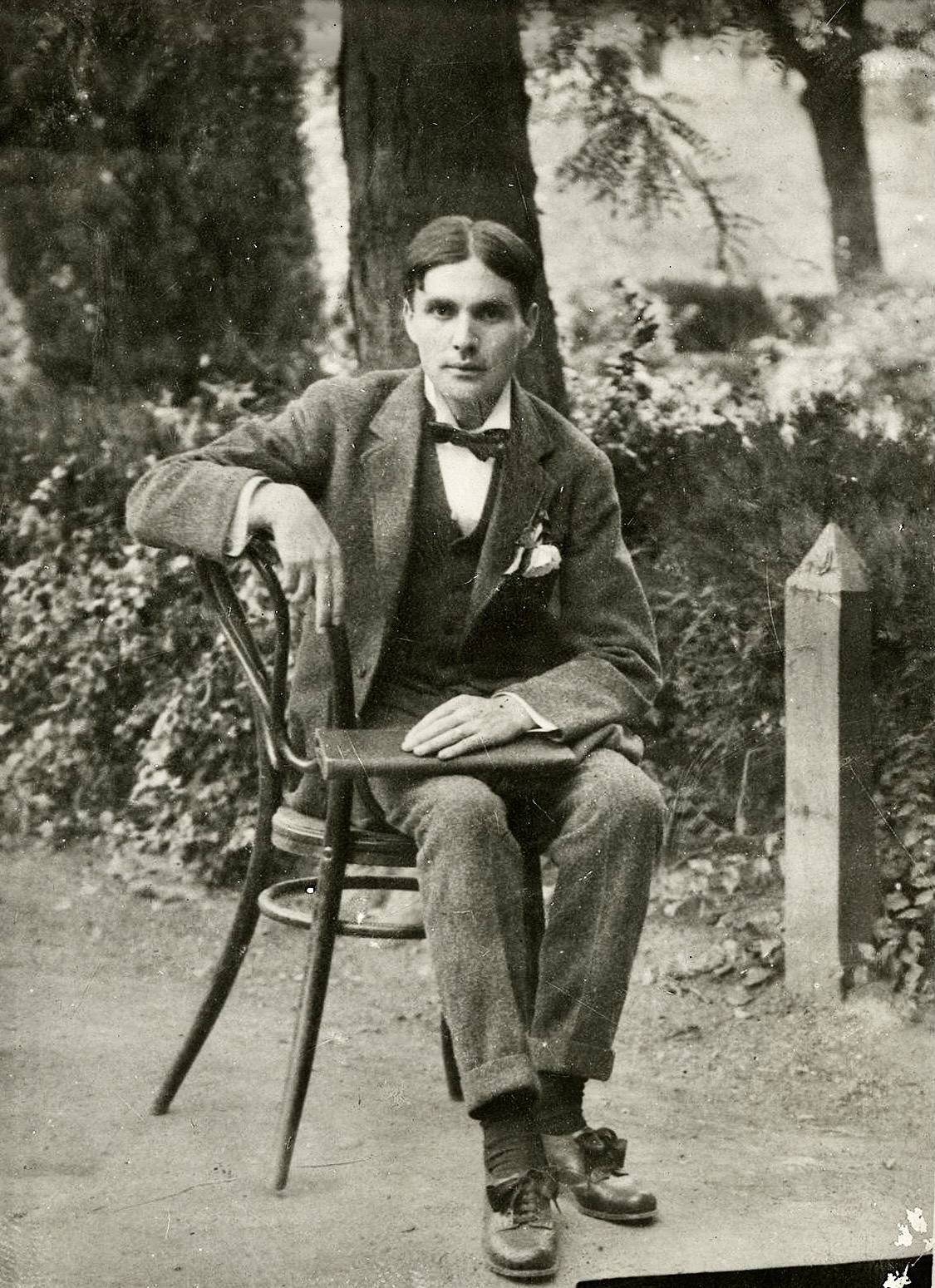
Galaktion as a young man

== Death ==
In 1959, he was placed in the hospital on Chavchavadze Avenue in Tbilisi. He ended his life, through jumping from the hospital window. He was interred at the Mtatsminda Pantheon, his funeral being attended by tens of thousands. In 2000 the Georgian Orthodox Church officially absolved Galaktion Tabidze from the sin of suicide.

== Legacy ==
Tabidze authored thousands of poems that established him as one of the greatest Georgian poets with an immense impact on modern Georgian literature. His archive of about 100,000 items in the Literary Museum in Tbilisi still awaits full investigation. He has been translated into Russian, French, English, and German.

== See also ==
- Giorgi Leonidze
- Valerian Gaprindashvili
- Paolo Iashvili

== Sources ==
- Rayfield, Donald (2000), The Literature of Georgia: A History, pp. 251–4. Routledge, ISBN 0-7007-1163-5
- Gould, Rebecca Ruth (2009), 'Blue Horses', 'Amirani', 'Exile' translated in “The Twilight of Georgian Literary Modernism,” Metamorphoses: Journal of the Five-College Seminar on Literary Translation 17 (1): 88-103.
- Kveselava, M (2002), Anthology of Georgian Poetry, pp. 153–4. The Minerva Group, Inc., ISBN 0-89875-672-3. (The book includes English translations of Tabidze’s The Moon Over Mtatsminda and Let Banners Wave on High).
- Seymour-Smith, Martin (1985), The New Guide to Modern World Literature, pp. 1249–50. P. Bedrick Books, ISBN 0-87226-000-3.
- Mikaberidze, Alexander (ed., 2007). Tabidze, Galaktion. Dictionary of Georgian National Biography. Accessed on July 4, 2007.
- (in German) Chotiwari-Jünger, Steffi. Tabije (Tabidse), Galaktion. Gero von Wilpert: Lexikon der Weltliteratur. Alfred Kröner Verlag, Stuttgart 2004.
- (in German) Lichtenfeld, Kristiane. Galaktion Tabidse. Georgica. Bd. 15 (1992), S. 119-126
- Tabiże, Galaktion (2005). Poems. Tʻbilisi: Tbilisi State University press. ISBN 999403894X. OCLC 1311045579.
