= Tsirekidze =

Tsirekidze (Georgian: ცირეკიძე) is a Georgian surname. Notable individuals with this surname include:

- Irakli Tsirekidze (born 1982), Georgian judoka
- Rauli Tsirekidze (born 1987), Georgian weightlifter
- Revaz Tsirekidze (1934–2007), Georgian fencer
- Sandro Tsirekidze (1894–1923), Georgian poet
