= Sagarejo Municipality =

Coordinates: 41°44′N 45°20′E

Sagarejo Municipality საგარეჯო მუნიციპალიტეტი
- Municipality
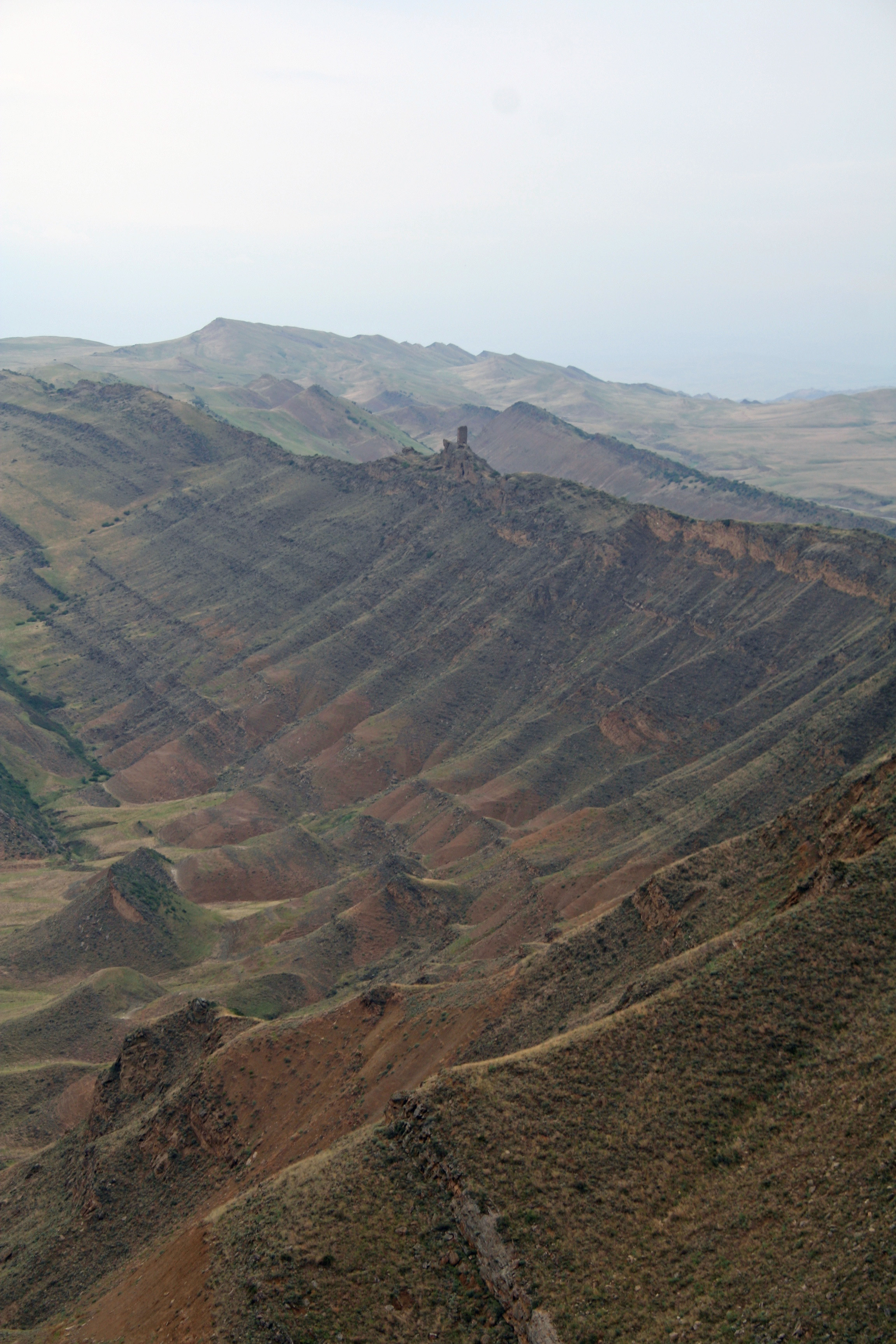
- David Gareja

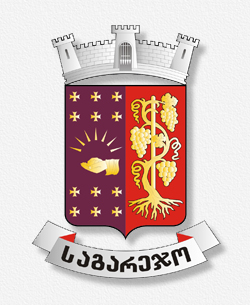
- Flag Seal

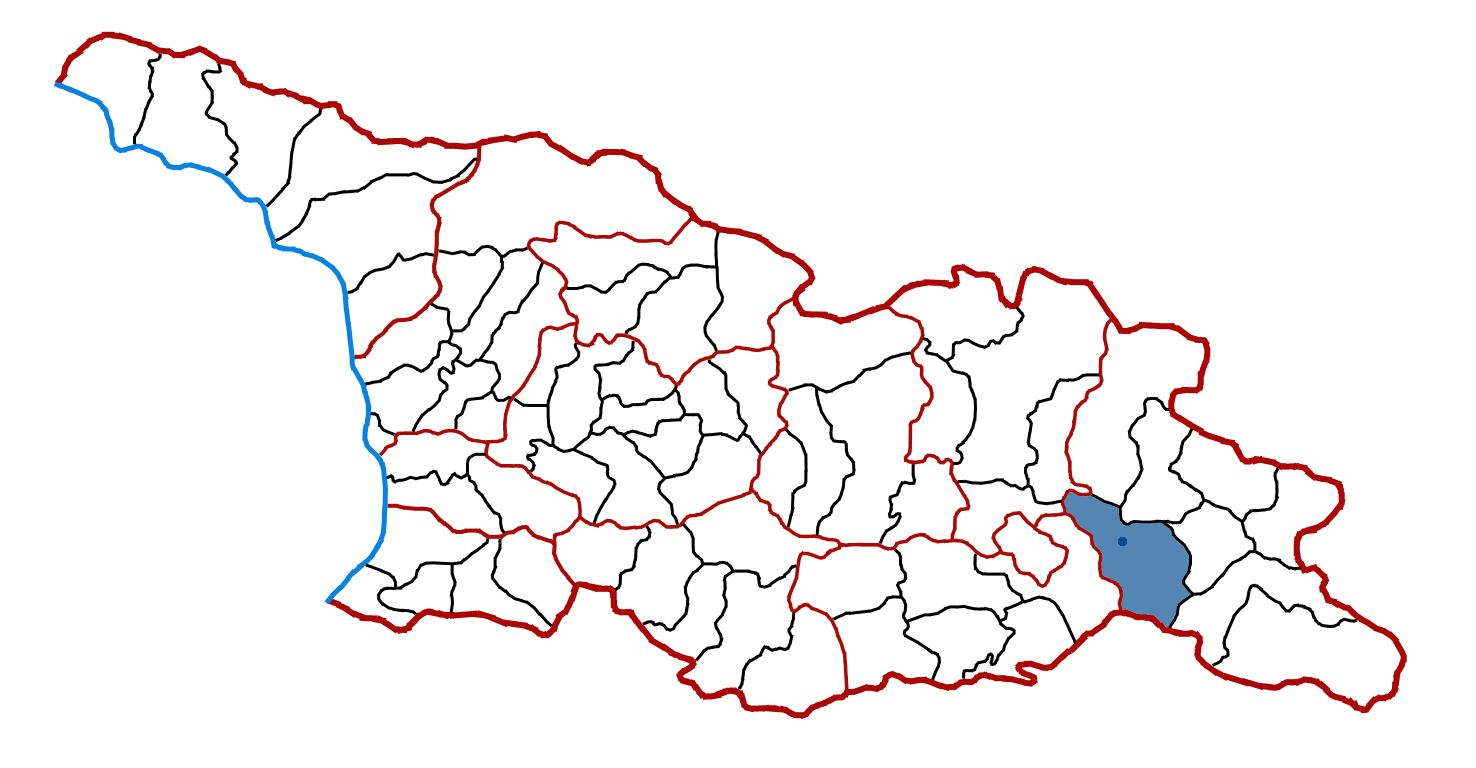
- Interactive map of Sagarejo Municipality
- Country: Georgia
- Mkhare: Kakheti
- capital city: Sagarejo

Government
  - mayor: Giorgi Erbotsonashvili

Area
  - Total: 1,491 km^{2} (576 sq mi)

Population (2014)
  - Total: 51,761
  - Density: 34.7/km^{2} (90/sq mi)

Population by ethnicity
  - Georgians: 66.09%
  - Azerbaijanis: 33.16%
  - Russians: 0.33%
  - Armenians: 0.18%
  - Yazidis: 0.06%
- Time zone: UTC+4 (Georgian Standard Time)
- Website: http://www.sagarejo.gov.ge/

Sagarejo (Georgian: საგარეჯოს მუნიციპალიტეტი) is a municipality of Georgia, in the region of Kakheti. Its main town is Sagarejo.

== History ==
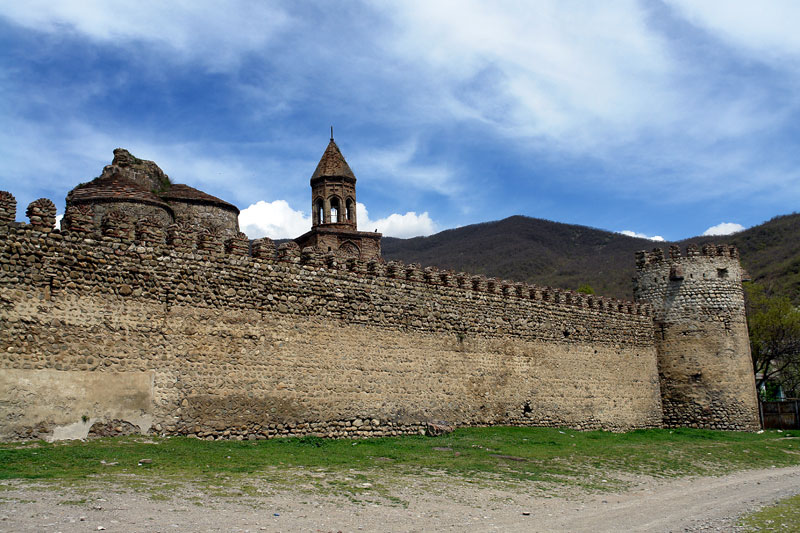
Ninotsminda Cathedral

In the 17th century, the reconstruction of Sagarejo, which was destroyed by Shah Abbas's expeditions, began with the efforts of Onophre Machutadze, the leader of Gareja. At the beginning of the 20th century, 900 households lived in Sagarejo, most of them were Georgians and 70 households were Armenians. In 1929 it became the center of Gare Kakheti district, which in 1933 was renamed by Sagarejo district. Since 2006 – municipality.

== Administrative divisions and population ==
Sagarejo Municipality is a group of settlements that have administrative boundaries and an administrative center – the city of Sagarejo. Municipality has an elected representative Assembly (Sakrebulo) and an executive body (City Hall), a registered population, own property, budget, and revenues. The municipality is a legal entity of public law.

According to the National Statistics Office of Georgia, the population of Sagarejo Municipality as of 1 January 2021, is 52.3 thousand people. 10.5 thousand people live in urban areas and 41.8 thousand people in rural areas.

Sagarejo Municipality consists of 25 administrative units and 48 settlements.

1. Administrative unit City of Sagarejo
2. Administrative unit of Badiauri
3. Administrative unit of Didi Chailuri
4. Administrative unit of Duzagrama (including Paldo, Tsitsmatiani)
5. Administrative unit of Giorgitsminda (including Antoki, Mariamjvari, Kvemo Samgori)
6. Administrative unit of Gombori (including Rusiani, Verona, Vashliani, Askilauri)
7. Administrative unit of Iormughanlo (including Mughanlo, Keshalo)
8. Administrative unit of Kakabeti
9. Administrative unit of Kandaura (including Kvemo Kandaura, Zemo Kandaura)
10. Administrative unit of Khashmi
11. Administrative unit of Kochbaani (including Otarani, Sasadilo, Gorana, Botko, Khinchebi, Ikvlivgorana)
12. Administrative unit of Lambalo (including Zemo Lambalo, Kvemo Lambalo)
13. Administrative unit of Manavi (including Zemo Burdiani)
14. Administrative unit of Mzisguli
15. Administrative unit of Ninotsminda
16. Administrative unit of Patara Chailuri
17. Administrative unit of Patardzeuli
18. Administrative unit of Sataphle
19. Administrative unit of Shibliani
20. Administrative unit of Tokhliauri
21. Administrative unit of Tskarostavi
22. Administrative unit of Tulari (including Kazlari)
23. Administrative unit of Udabno
24. Administrative unit of Ujarma
25. Administrative unit of Verkhviani

== Geography ==
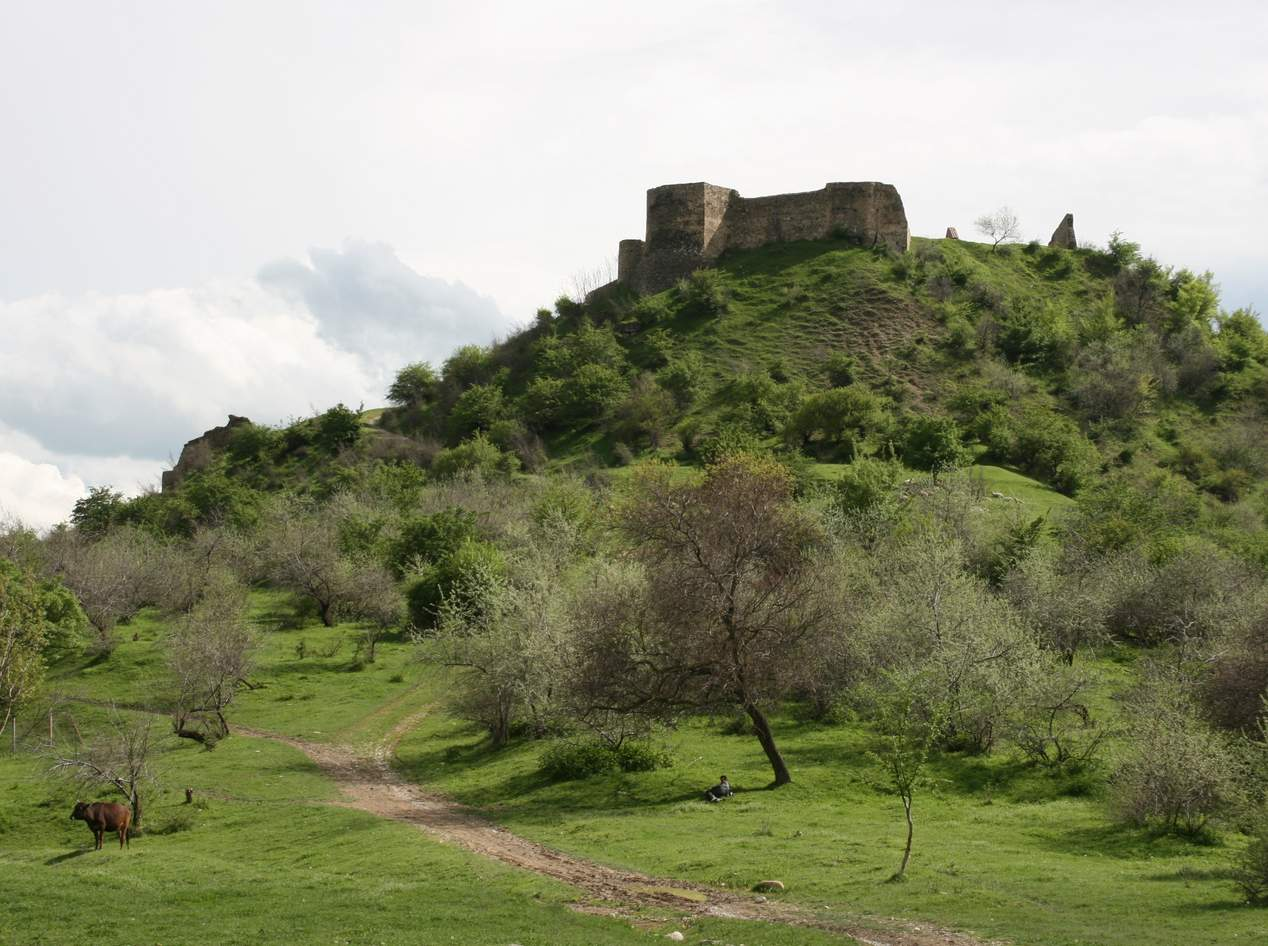
Manavi fortress

The territory of Sagarejo municipality is diverse from a geomorphological point of view. The southern part of the municipality is located on a flat-hilly plateau, built of Neogene and Quaternary sediments. Geologically it consists of monocline heights and syncline basins. Dry valleys, ravines, gorges, and also terraces are built on the upper terrain.

== Politics ==
Sagarejo Municipal Assembly (Georgian: საგარეჯოს საკრებულო) is a representative body in Sagarejo Municipality. currently consisting of 39 members. The council is assembles into session regularly, to consider subject matters such as code changes, utilities, taxes, city budget, oversight of city government and more. Sagarejo sakrebulo is elected every four year. The last election was held in October 2021.

Party	2017	2021	Current Municipal Assembly
Georgian Dream	31	29	
United National Movement	2	9	
Lelo		1	
European Georgia	2		
Alliance of Patriots	1		
Independent	1		
Total	37	39	

== Education ==
There are 26 public schools in Sagarejo Municipality, 4 of them are located in Sagarejo.

There are 3 non-governmental (private) educational institutions on the territory of the municipality. Tamar Garejeli and Patardzeuli Georgian-French School-Lyceum teach at the secondary level of the school, whereas Ilia Chavchavadze Sagarejo High Education Institution has Secondary and Vocational Education Programs.

There are 26 nursery schools on the territory of Sagarejo Municipality, as well as Sagarejo Student-Youth House and Georgian Language Learning Center in the village of Duzagrama. Jemal Burjanadze Music School operates in Sagarejo.

== Culture ==
There is a Puppet Theater in Sagarejo Municipality. It was founded in 1956 under the leadership of Ilia Buziashvili. Up to twenty plays have been staged in the theater by generations of amateur actors for 40 years.

Sagarejo Puppet Theater became a laureate of festivals organized by the Georgian State Folklore Center in 1996, 1998, 1999, 2001, 2014. It is a winner of various nominations. In 1999 it was awarded the honorary title of People's Theater.

=== Festivals and public holidays ===
Event	Date	Description
Garejoba	May	Public holiday Garejoba is held in May of each year. The place of the celebration is Chichkhituri tower near the Davit-Gareji monastery complex, Udabno village. The idea of establishing the holiday belongs to the Georgian public figure, Solomon Lapauri.
Goglaoba	May	Public holiday – Goglaoba is held every May in the village of Patardzeuli, Sagarejo Municipality. The holiday is dedicated to the memory of Georgian poet and writer Giorgi Leonidze and is held in his home village.
Berikaoba	Week before Shrovetide	In the village of Didi Chailuri, Sagarejo Municipality, every spring, the week before Shrovetide, the ancient Georgian holiday – Berikaoba is celebrated.
Rezooba	June	Public holiday – Rezooba, is dedicated to the memory of Georgian writer Revaz Inanishvili. The festival was founded in 2016 and is held every June in the writer's native village Khashmi.

== Sport ==
There are three sports schools in Sagarejo Municipality, where teenagers train in 9 sports: Georgian wrestling, sambo, judo, freestyle wrestling, football, rugby, chess, athletics, and swimming. There are 10 wrestling halls, 10 mini and one standard sports field in Sagarejo Municipality. There are three recreational zones, a swimming pool, and tennis courts.

"Gareji 1960" football club operates in Sagarejo municipality. It was established in 1960. A professional sports team competes in the National League.

== Economy ==
Viticulture and wine production are the main fields of agriculture in Sagarejo Municipality. There are micro-zones in the municipality, where well-known wines of the place of origin such as Manavi Mtsvane and Khashmi Saperavi are traditionally produced.

The leading branches of the economy in Sagarejo municipality are production of wheat flour, wine, chicken/eggs, tobacco, and bricks.

== Historical landmarks and sightseeing ==
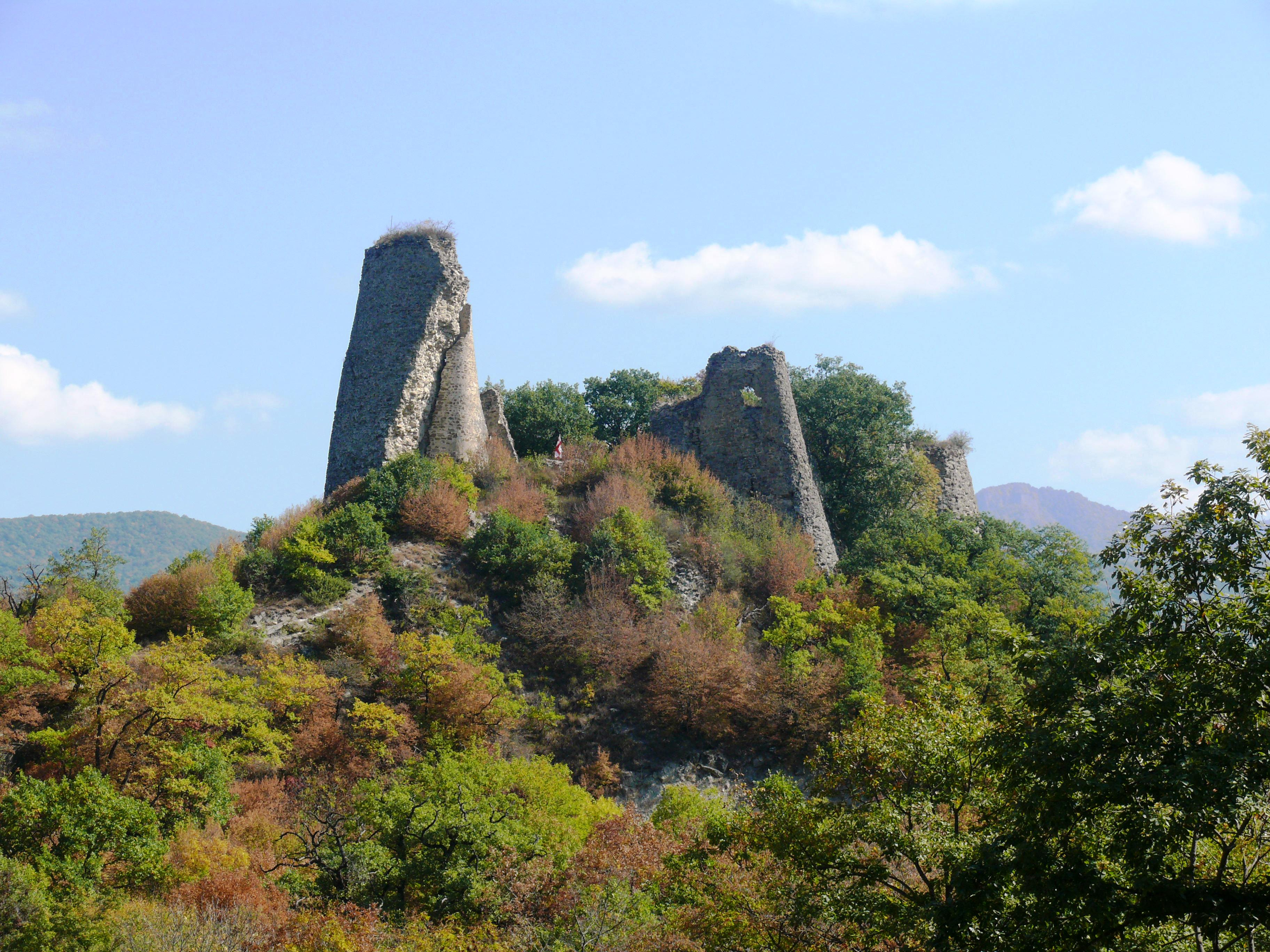
Ujarma fortress

Mariamjvari State Nature Reserve is located on the southern slopes of Gombori, in Sagarejo municipality. Its total area amounts to 1040 ha. It was founded in 1935 to maintain untouched landscapes of relict-sosnovski pine (Pinus Sosnowsky Nakai) of the Caucasus. Most of the reserve area is covered with forest. Hornbeams, oriental hornbeams, oaks, beeches, maples, and the grey poplars grow here.

David Gareja – one of the most prominent religious and cultural centers of feudal Georgia, a complex of monastic caves. It is located on the territory of Sagarejo municipality, 60–70 km south-east of Tbilisi, in Gareji valley. The small part of the monastery complex (Bertubani) is located on the territory of Azerbaijan. Udabno and Chichkhituri monasteries are disputed between Azerbaijan and Georgia. The complex was founded in the first half of the 6th century by one of the Assyrian fathers, David.

Ninotsminda Monastery – a fenced monastery complex – a temple, a four-story brick bell tower (16th century), a two-story palace of Metropolitan Saba Tusishvili (1774–1777) and the remnants of the other buildings are located in Ninotsminda.

Manavi Fortress – a fortress in Gare Kakheti is located near the village of Manavi in Sagarejo Municipality, on a high mountain. Here was one of the centers of the last period of feudal Kakheti. The old layer of the castle dates back to the 10th-11th centuries, and the new one to the 16th-18th centuries.

Patara Chailuri Castle-Tower – an architectural monument is located south of the village of Patara Chailuri, Sagarejo Municipality. It belongs to the middle years of the 17th century. It is severely damaged. Only the east and north walls are preserved.

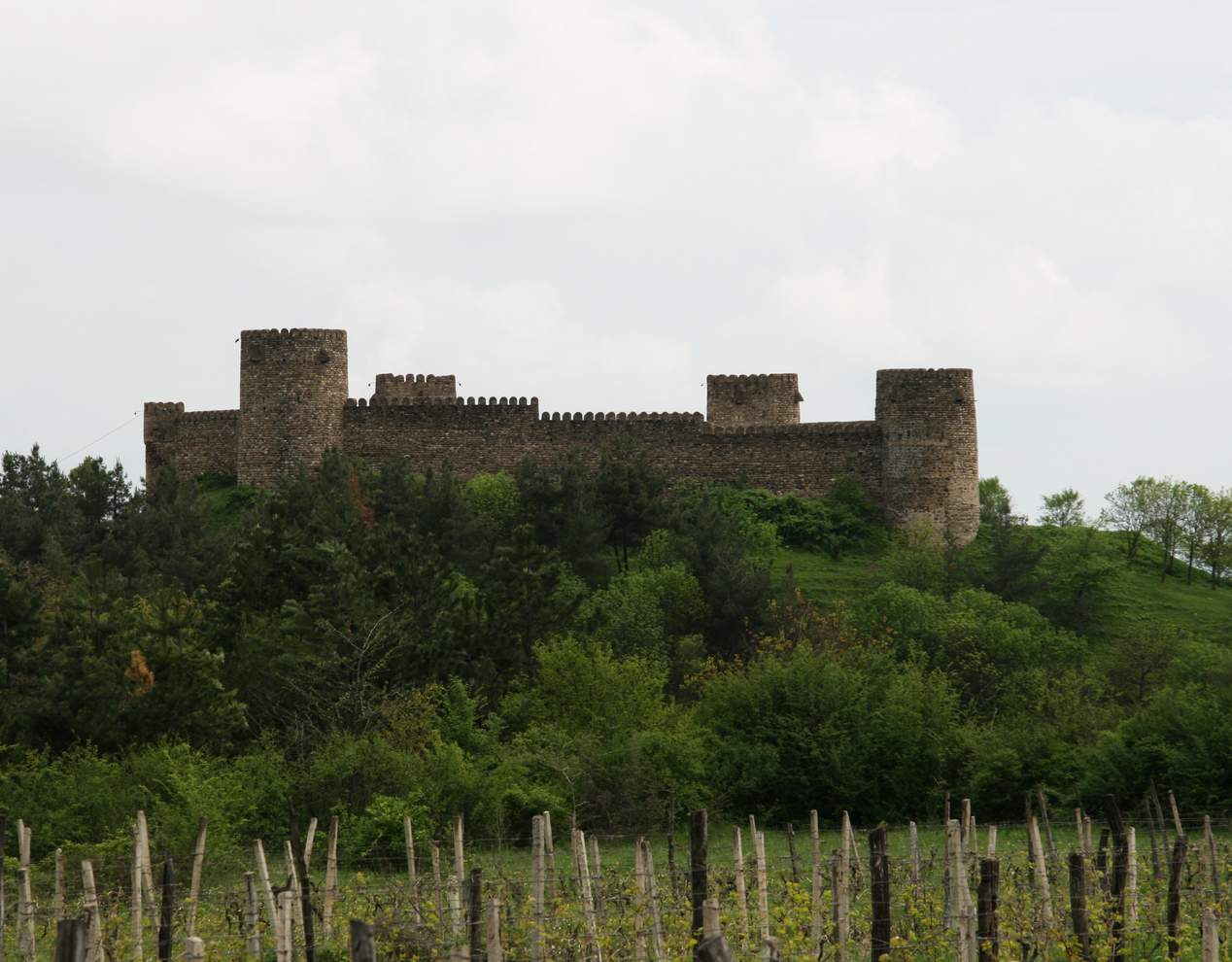
niakhuri fortress

Niakhuri Fortress – a fortress on the hill to the right of the Sagarejo-Gurjaani Highway, south of the villages of Patara Chailuri and Didi Chailuri. It belongs to the period of the 17th-18th centuries.

Ujarma fortress – Ujarma – a historic fortress-town in Georgia is located 4 km north of the village of Ujarma in Sagarejo Municipality, near Gombori Pass. The period of the construction of Ujarma is considered to be the period of the reign of King Asphagur in 3rd-4th centuries. Vakhtang Gorgasali and Dachi took care of its decoration and strengthening. In the 4th-8th centuries Ujarma played an important role in the history of the country.

Sagarejo Museum of Local Lore – the Historical Museum was founded in 1958. The museum houses 7050 exhibits. The museum preserves archeological excavations and some accidental findings in the territory of the Kakheti region including household and ethnographic materials, works of applied art from the Late Bronze Age to the Middle Ages.

Giorgi (Gogla) Leonidze House-Museum – House-Museum of Georgian Poet, Writer and Public Figure in the village of Patardzeuli, Sagarejo Municipality. It was built by Giorgi Leonidze's father, Nikoloz, who was sent to the church of St. Shio as a priest in the 1860s.

Ketevan Dokhturashvili Rural History Museum – The historical museum is located in the village of Patardzeuli, Sagarejo Municipality. The museum has been operating since 2007. The museum preserves archeological, ethnographic, numismatic, notaphily samples, photos, and research materials.

== Notable people ==
Photo	Name	Years	Description
	Giorgi Leonidze	1900–1966	Georgian writer, poet, and a public figure.
	Arsen Mekokishvili	1912–1972	Georgian wrestler (freestyle; sambo)
	Revaz Inanishvili	1926–1991	Georgian Writer
	Levan Tediashvili	1948 -	Georgian wrestler (freestyle; sambo) Two-time Olympic champion.

== Twin towns ==
- Širvintos, Lithuania

== See also ==
- List of municipalities in Georgia (country)
