= Writers' House of Georgia =

Mansion in Tbilisi, Georgia

Coordinates: 41°41′25″N 44°47′59″E

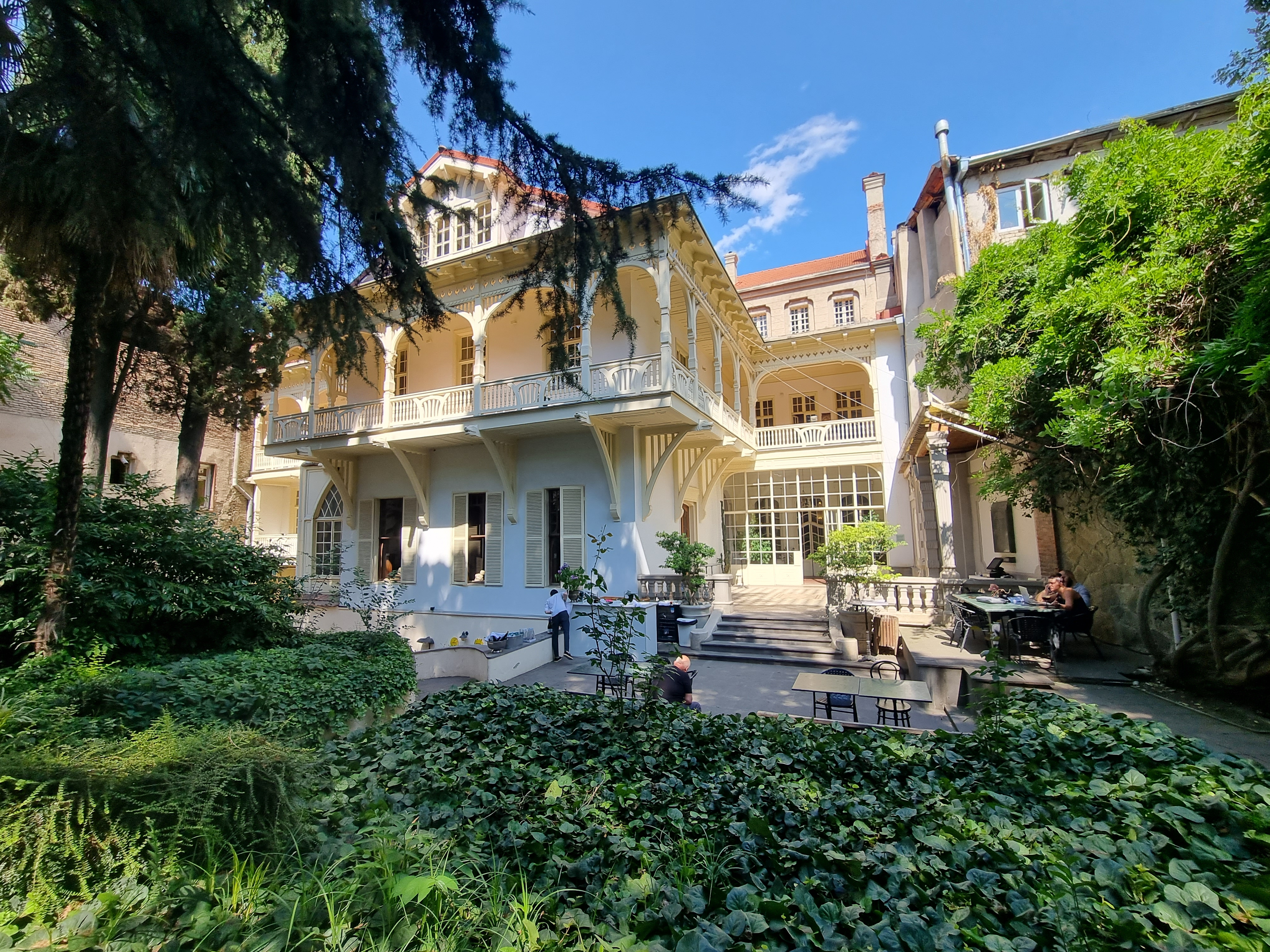
Writers' House of Georgia, from the inner courtyard

The Writers' House of Georgia is a mansion in Tbilisi dedicated to the promotion of literature and a focal point of Georgian literature. The mansion was built by David Sarajishvili, an entrepreneur, between 1903 and 1905. The architect of the building was Karl Zaar, and the building combines art nouveau with neobaroque style elements. The terrace mosaic is made from tiles by Villeroy and Boch. It is located in Sololaki, on Ivane Machabeli Street 13.

The Writers' House was a location in which major figures of Georgian literature, such as the Blue Horns group, met in the early 1920s. Paolo Iashvili committed suicide at the Writers' House on July 22, 1937. As an article in the Financial Times put it, the Writers' House "has been the centrepiece of Georgian literary society for over a century, its triumphs and tragedies tracing the political contours of the country’s history."

From 2008 onward, the building was re-dedicated to literature, and now serves as a hub for major literary and cultural events.

In 2017, the Writers' House launched a residency program. On the 100 year anniversary of the Soviet occupation, in 2021, with support of "Tbilisi - UNESCO World Book Capital 2021", the Museum of Repressed Writers was opened at the Writers' House. This exhibit, covering two rooms and with multimedia elements, has been designed by Mariam Natroshvili and Detu Jincharadze, also with documents from the SovLab Research Laboratory.

The Writers' House founding director was Natasha Lomouri, who was appointed in 2011 and led the institution until August 2023. In August 2023, Ketevan Dumbadze, a member of parliament for the ruling Georgian Dream party, was appointed as the new director of the institution. A number of Georgian writers have protested against this appointment, and demanded a consultative process that involves writers and people from the publishing sector.

In summer months, the Writers' House also houses a restaurant in its garden.

The goals of the Writers' House are the popularization of Georgian literature, the growth of creative translation, support for various literary processes, the establishment of literary competitions and awards, active engagement with foreign governmental and non-governmental structures, and the publication of literary journals. The Writers' House focuses its operations on enhancing literary-cultural activities, locally and internationally, as well as public outreach and education.
