= Mzisguli =

Village in Georgia

Mzisguli მზისგული
- Village

- Location of Mzisguli Mzisguli (Kakheti)
- Coordinates: 41°38′18″N 45°35′18″E
- Country: Georgia
- Region: Kakheti
- Municipality: Sagarejo
- Village: 1909
- Elevation: 460 m (1,510 ft)

Population (1 January 2024)
  - Total: 543
- Time zone: UTC+4 (Georgian Time)

Mzisguli (Georgian: მზისგული), formerly known as Bogdanovka (Georgian: ბოგდანოვკა) (until 2012), is a village in Georgia. It is part of Sagarejo Municipality in the region of Kakheti.

== Geography ==
The village is located on the northern edge of the Kachreti Plain, on the left bank of the Mdivri River, at an elevation of 460 metres above sea level. It is 28 km from the town of Sagarejo, the administrative centre of the municipality.

The S5 international highway, also known as the Kakheti Highway, passes through the village. It connects the capital, Tbilisi, with the Kakheti region and the border with Azerbaijan.

== History ==
=== Foundation ===
As of the early 20th century, the lands surrounding the present-day village of Mzisguli, as well as the neighbouring villages of Arashenda and Kachreti, belonged to the princely Andronikashvili family. In 1908, Prince Malkhaz Andronikashvili defaulted on a loan from the State Bank, resulting in the confiscation of 13,000 desyatinas of land.

In 1909, the tsarist government settled 120 families of landless peasants from the Don Host Oblast in the area. The settlers founded a village named Bogdanovka, a name said to mean "a place given by God", according to local resident Alexandre Elerdashvili. In the following years, several settlements were established nearby by these and subsequent waves of Russian settlers: Makaevka, Alandara, Second Alandara, Gvozdeevka, Soldatskiy, and Zelenoe Pole. However, most of these settlements had disappeared before the outbreak of World War I, as the settlers returned to their places of origin.

According to another account, Bogdanovka was a settlement of Molokans, members of a Russian spiritual Christian movement who faced persecution in the Russian Empire. However, this account has no documentary evidence and is probably the result of confusion. There was another settlement named Bogdanovka in Georgia, now the town of Ninotsminda, founded by Russian Doukhobors. In addition, the well-known Molokan village of Malkhazovka, also known as Krasnogorsk, was located in the Sagarejo district and is now called Sataple.

=== After World War II ===
In the 1950s, residents of nearby Georgian villages began moving to Bogdanovka in significant numbers. These included Shibliani, Verkhviani, Zemo Kandaura, Kvemo Kandaura, and Kakabeti. In 1966, a Georgian-language section was opened at the local Russian-language school. In the 1960s, Alexandre Nalekrishvili, a native of Kandaura, became chairman of the Bogdanovka village council. He also served as the principal of Bogdanovka Secondary School.

Ethnic Russians constituted the majority of Bogdanovka's population until the early 1990s. By 2012, around a dozen residents identified as exclusively Russian remained in the village, alongside many mixed-ethnicity families.

=== Renaming ===
By Decree No. 82 of 3 February 2012, issued by Georgian president Mikheil Saakashvili, the village was renamed Mzisguli. The decree also renamed Krasnogorsk in the Sagarejo district to Sataple and Svobodny in the Lagodekhi district to Davitiani. These villages were the first to be renamed under the Freedom Charter, a law adopted by the Parliament of Georgia in 2011 that provided for a partial ban on communist symbols and lustration.

== Demographics ==
According to the 2024 census, Mzisguli had a population of 543. Ethnic Georgians accounted for 93.6% of the population, Russians for 5%, and Ukrainians for 1%.

== Notable people ==
- Oleksandr Petrovskyi (born Nalekrishvili) is a Ukrainian businessman and philanthropist, and president of the International Charitable Foundation "Solidarity". He is the grandson of Alexandre Nalekrishvili, who served as head of the village and principal of the local school. Petrovskyi spent the first nine years of his life in Mzisguli (then Bogdanovka). His parents, Tamaz Nalekrishvili and Oksana Vovk, were married there.
