= Lionidze =

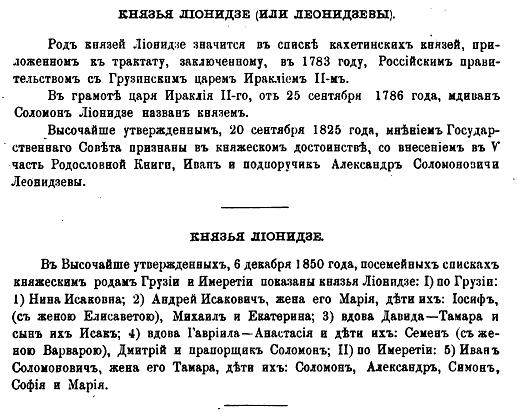
Genealogy of the Princes Leonidze

The House of Lionidze (Georgian: ლიონიძე) or Leonidze (ლეონიძე) is a Georgian noble family, which also later became part of the Russian nobility.

== History ==
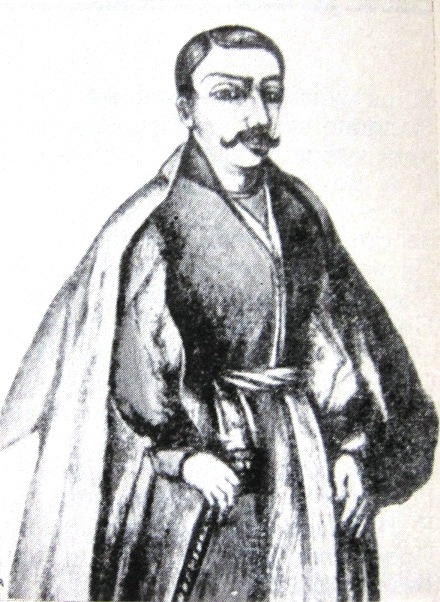
Solomon Lionidze, Chancellor of Georgia

The family originated from the province of Kakheti and were elevated to the princely rank by King Heraclius II of Georgia in the mid-18th century. They were confirmed as the princes Lionidaev in Imperial Russia according to the decrees of 1825 and 1850.

== Notable members ==
- Giorgi Leonidze (1899-1966), Georgian poet and literary scholar
