= Mary Eristavi =

Russian noble (1888–1986)

Mary Shervashidze
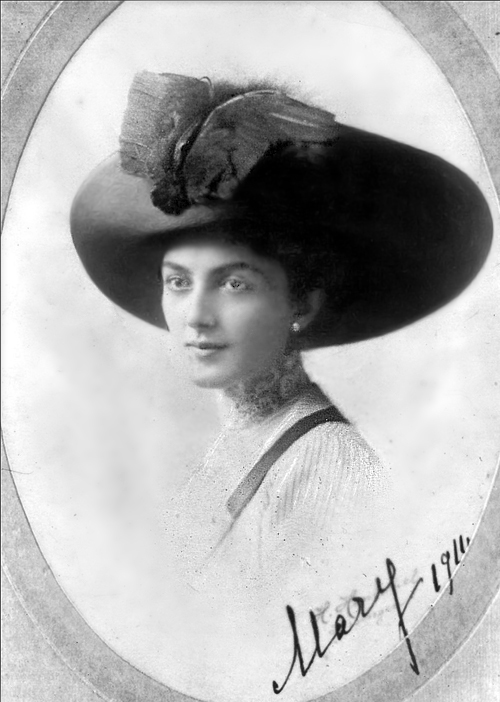
- Mary in 1911
- Full name: Mary Prokofis asuli Eristavi-Shervashidze
- Born: 1888; Batumi, Georgia, Russian Empire
- Died: January 21, 1986 (aged 97–98); Paris, France
- Spouse: George Eristavi

Mary Eristavi (Georgian: მერი ერისთავი-შერვაშიძე; née Shervashidze; 1888 – January 21, 1986) was a Georgian aristocrat, fashion icon, and one of the earliest models of Coco Chanel. She held a respectable position in Georgian high society, as well as the Russian Imperial court for the last few decades of its existence. Mary is sometimes believed to be the hopeless infatuation of Galaktion Tabidze, one of the leading Georgian poets of the time.

== Biography ==
=== Family and early life ===
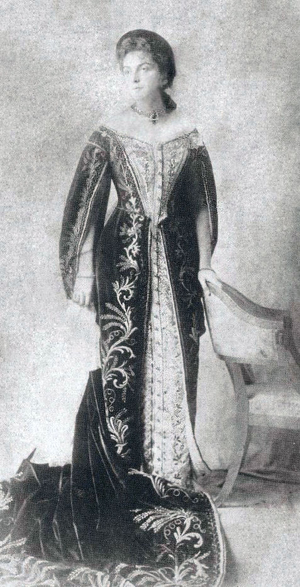
Mary as a lady-in-waiting

Mary was born in Batumi, Georgia, into the family of Georgian General Major Prince Prokof Shervashidze. She was popular in Georgia for her beauty and gentle complexion and even drew compliments from Emperor Nicholas II of Russia when he met her during his 1912 visit to Tiflis.

Because her father became a member of the Imperial Duma, the family soon had to move to Saint Petersburg where Mary became a lady-in-waiting to Empress Alexandra Feodorovna. After her father's death, Mary moved back to her native Georgia and spent the rest of her youth in the west of the country with her mother and twin sisters, Ellen and Tamar.

=== Marriage and Bolshevik invasion of Georgia ===
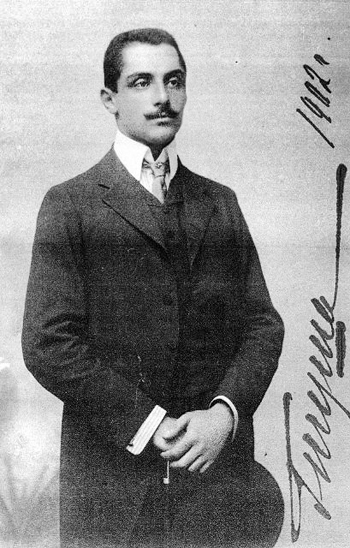
Mary's husband, Prince George

After the establishment of the First Georgian Republic following the Russian Revolution, Mary's fiancé Prince George Eristavi — an important Georgian nobleman, great-great grandson of King Heraclius II of Georgia and a former aide-de-camp of Nicholas II — returned to Georgia with intent to marry her. They wed in Kutaisi soon after his arrival and, likely because of security reasons, settled permanently in the country which at that time was a stable Menshevik stronghold under German protection.

The peace in Georgia did not last long and the couple was forced to flee the country in March 1921, during the Red Army Invasion. In order to escape imminent imprisonment, deportation or death, Mary, along with other prominent Georgian noblemen and government officials, departed on a ship from the city of Batumi. She was reunited with her husband in Istanbul where George had been waiting for her; the couple continued the voyage to France together.

=== France and final years ===
After arriving in Paris, Mary and George settled on the Rue de la Tour in the 16th arrondissement, a district popular with the French high society. Because of losses incurred as a result of fleeing Georgia, Mary's family met some financial problems while living in this expensive neighborhood. For this reason, Mary's mother and sisters, Ellen and Tamar, initially lived with the young couple. This situation changed when the family managed to open its own clothing atelier and further improved as Mary found a modeling position with Coco Chanel, an increasingly popular French designer at the time.

Soon after this success, Mary's family moved out and her husband, George, died; the couple had not had any children. Mary spent the rest of her life living alone and rarely made contact with other Georgian émigrés, with the exception of her visits to a local parish of the Georgian Orthodox Church. In the final years of her life she was forced to move to a nursing home where, thanks to her improved financial circumstances, she was provided with a personal maid. Despite the relocation, she continued to visit her friends in the 16th arrondissement to play cards. According to her friend Babo Dadiani, Mary's room was filled with flowers from known and unknown admirers.

Because of the Soviet Union's closed-door immigration policy, Mary, just like other émigrés from the First Republic, was never able to return to Batumi, dying in France at the age of 97. She and her husband were buried at Sainte-Geneviève-des-Bois Russian Cemetery. Mary was painted by Savely Sorin; her husband by Tamara de Lempicka, a popular Polish painter. It was widely believed that Mary Eristavi died without any direct descendants, a belief shaped in part by the upheavals of the Soviet era and the displacement of many noble families. However, while there is no public record of children born to her, it is noted that a relative from her extended family—named "Mary" in her honour—is believed to be a descendant. This individual is said to reside outside of Georgia, bears a different surname, and has remained away from public and political life.

== Mary and Galaktion ==
Georgian poet Galaktion Tabidze is sometimes thought to have been in love with Mary. The word of Tabidze's alleged romantic feelings for the princess spread throughout Georgia after the publication of his poem titled "Mary," in which the poet bitterly described the wedding ceremony of a certain Mary, without specifying whether he was referring to Princess Eristavi. Princess Mary herself disagreed with the rumors, stressing that the poem was first published in 1915 in a Georgian journal Theater and Life, while her wedding to Prince George Eristavi did not occur until 1918. Some sources confirm this, alleging that it was only in 1935 when Galaktion met Mary by accident as she sat in front of Louvre.
