= Patardzeuli =

Patardzeuli პატარძეული
- Location in Georgia
- Coordinates: 41°44′40″N 45°14′35″E
- Country: Georgia
- Region: Kakheti
- Municipality: Sagarejo
- Elevation: 800 m (2,600 ft)

Population (2014)
  - Total: 2,829
- Time zone: UTC+4

Patardzeuli (Georgian: პატარძეული), is a village in Eastern Georgia, in Sagarejo District, of Kakheti Region, located about 50 kilometers from Tbilisi, the capital.

It was known in the past mainly because It is the hometown of a Georgian writer Giorgi Leonidze, to whom the public school is still dedicated.

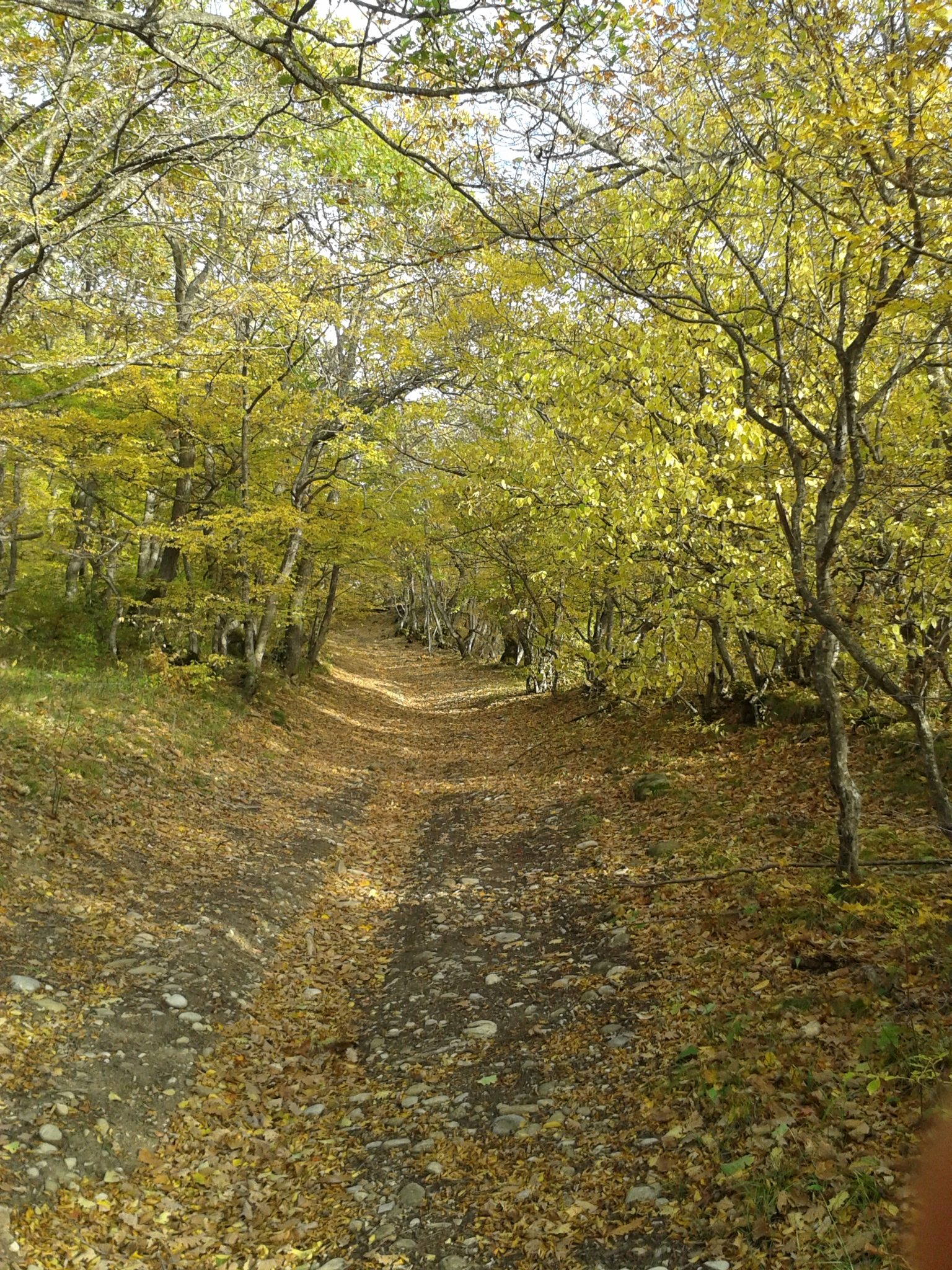
country path during the fall

Currently, Patardzeuli is known for its beautiful surroundings, especially on the north side, bordering the Mariamjvari Strict Nature Reserve. It hosts two big schools: the above-mentioned public school, and the "Lyceum" Tsissière-Dighmelashvili (founded in 1996) where the students of the region have the opportunity learn European languages (mainly French and English) and culture.

Such schools are frequented every day by hundreds of students. Both schools have parks, are equipped with basic IT infrastructure, and offer a vegetarian canteen to all students and teachers.

== History ==
=== An episode during World War II ===
According to the "annales" of Patardzeuli, written in French and deposited in the Museum of the "Lyceum" Tsissière-Dirmelachvili (see above), during the year 1943, Giorgi Bilanishvili, citizen of Patardzeuli, came back from World War II, in which he was wounded, and was set up a grand ceremony, involving all the personalities of the village. During such ceremony, in which the above-mentioned Giorgi Bilanishvili was declared hero of the soviet Union, Lili gigaour, student of the 8th class, gave an account of his life, and a concert in his honour was held by the students: during such concert Giorgi, overwhelmed by emotion, cried. At that time, Khetevan Dokhturishvili is remembered as the teacher of the Georgian language, and Kokrashvili as mayor of the village. The village itself offered, during the same period of war, hundreds of quintals of bread and medicinal plants to the soldiers.

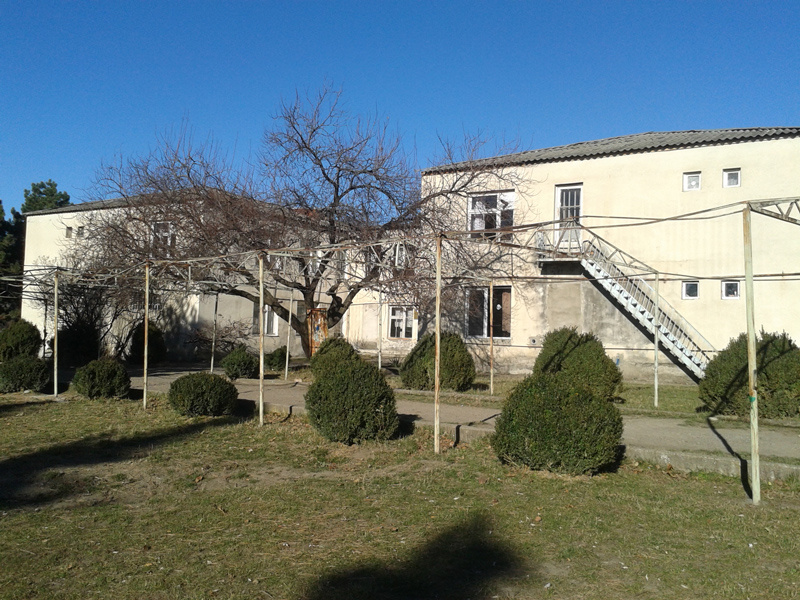
Lyceum

public school

== See also ==
- Kakheti
