= Chkvishi =

Chkvishi ჭყვიში
- Village
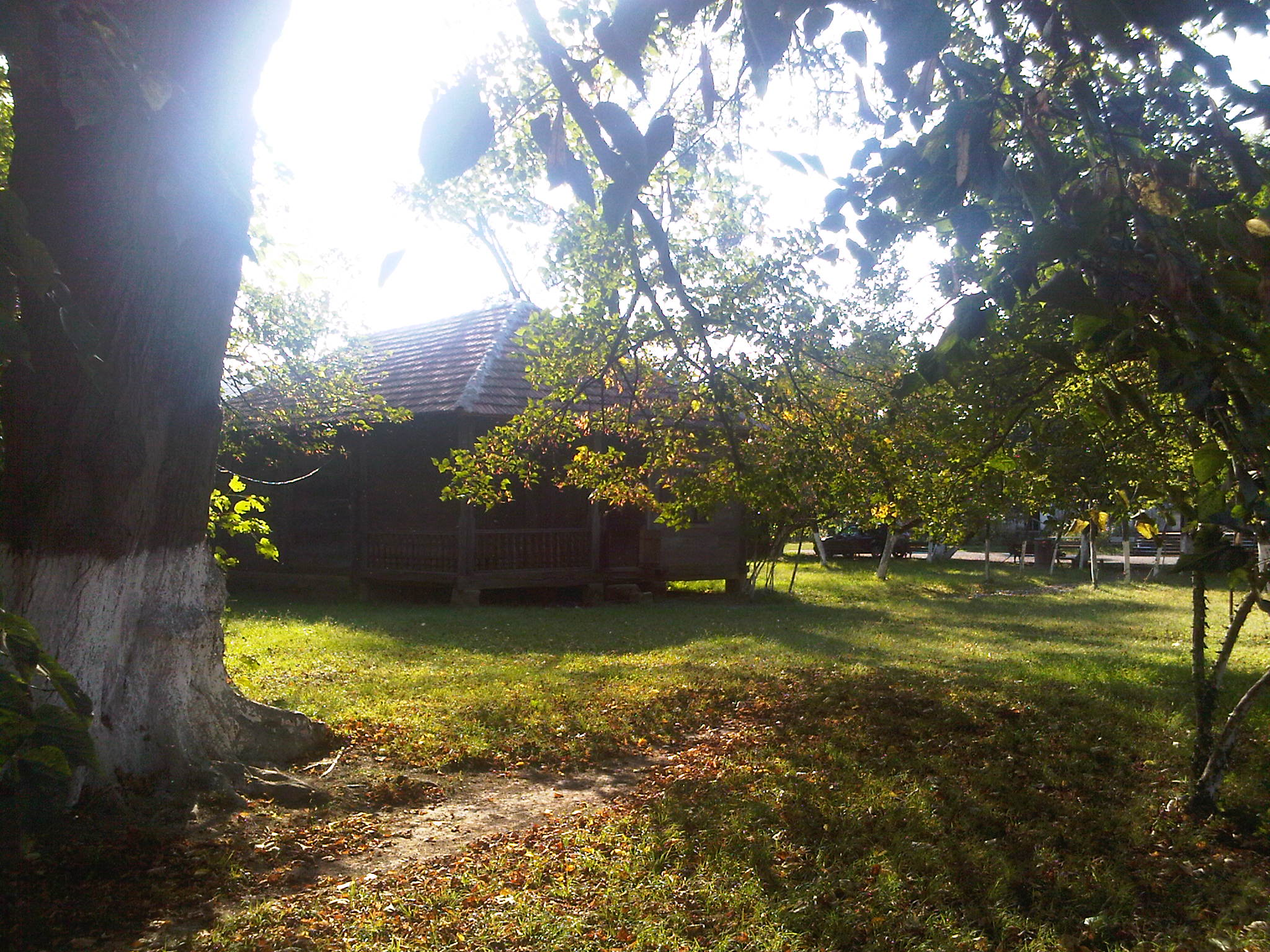
- The Galaktion and Titsian Tabidze House Museum

- Location of Chkvishi
- Coordinates: 42°07′31″N 42°26′01″E
- Country: Georgia
- Region: Imereti
- Municipality: Vani
- Elevation: 60 m (200 ft)

Population (2014)
  - Total: 376
- Time zone: UTC+4 (Georgian Time)

Chkvishi (Georgian: ჭყვიში) is a village in the Vani Municipality, Imereti Region, Georgia first mentioned in the 16th century. The Galaktion and Titsian Tabidze House Museum is located in the village.

== Population ==
As of the 2014 national census, Chkvishi had a population of 376, almost entirely Georgians.

Population	2002 census	2014 census
Total	543	376

== Notable residents ==
- Galaktion Tabidze, poet born in Chkvishi
- Titsian Tabidze, poet born in Chkvishi
