= Galaktion and Titsian Tabidze House Museum =

Museum in Skvishi, Georgia

- გალაკტიონ და ტიციან ტაბიძეების სახლ-მუზეუმი
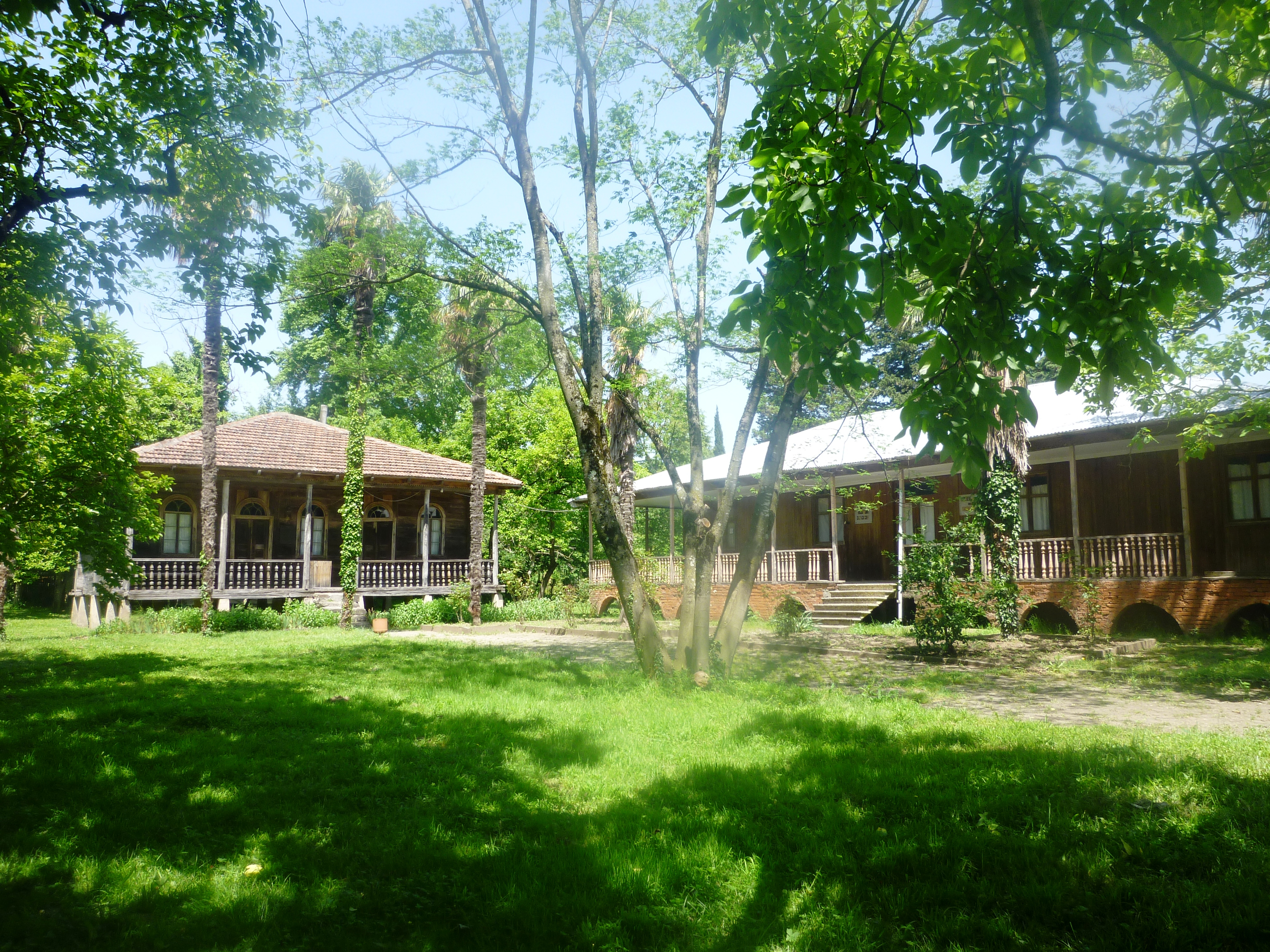
- Location: Georgia
- Coordinates: 42°07′50″N 42°25′34″E
- Location of Galaktion and Titsian Tabidze House Museum

The Galaktion and Titsian Tabidze House Museum (Georgian: და ტიციან ტაბიძეების სახლ-მუზეუმი) is a museum in the town of Chkvishi of Vani district in Georgia, and was opened in 1983.

The museum is located on a plot of 3 hectares. With 450 m² of permanent exhibition, periodic exhibitions in a 30 m² room, a 30 m² warehouse and a conference room. It was founded in 1966.

== Exhibitions ==
The museum has two exhibition buildings and the historic houses of Georgian poets, natives of this city, Galaktion (1892-1959) and Titsian Tabidze (1895-1937). It houses commemorative objects of both poets, old printed books from Galaktion's father's library, ceramics, embroidery samples and works by Georgian artists and sculptors.

In addition, the museum has exhibitions on the themes «Galaktion and Titsian», «Tsar-poet», «I was born in April», «Essays on Galaktion», «Titsian and Boris Pasternak».
