= Ekaterine Meiering-Mikadze =

Georgian diplomat

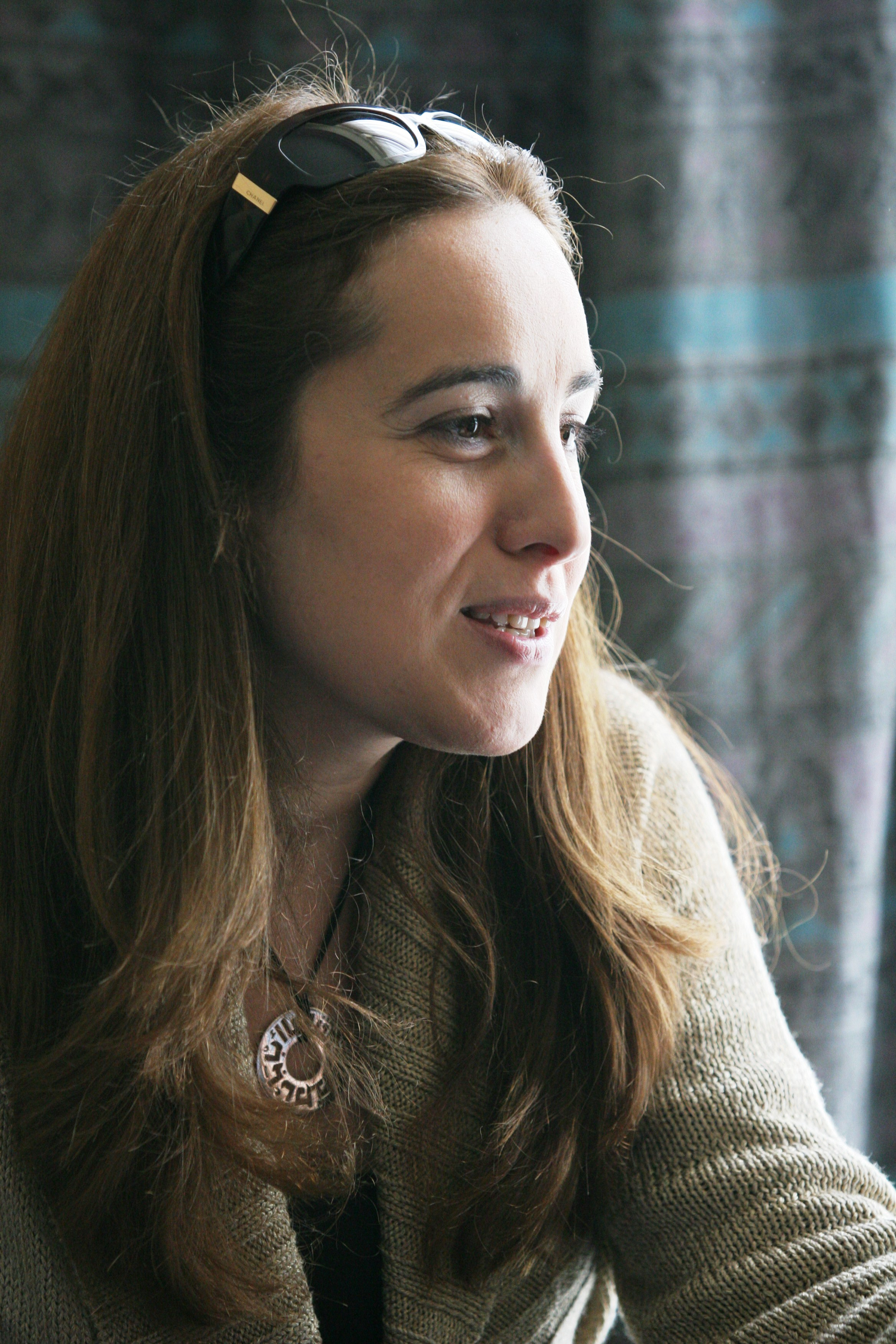
Ekaterine Meiering-Mikadze

Ekaterine Meiering-Mikadze (Georgian: ეკატერინე მაიერინგ-მიქაძე) is a diplomat, international relations expert and public policy consultant born in 1967. She served as Ambassador of Georgia to Qatar, Kuwait, Jordan, Saudi Arabia, Lebanon, Iraq, Bahrain, Oman and the United Arab Emirates. 2020-2021, she has been fellow of the Frontier Europe Initiative of the Middle East Institute as part of a programme focusing on strategic issues and state relations between Middle East countries and those parts of Eastern Europe, Central Asia and the Caucasus that constitute a frontier area between Western Europe, Russia and the Middle East.

== Early life and education ==
Ekaterine Meiering-Mikadze was born in Gori, Georgia in 1967 and attended school in the capital Tbilisi. In 1984 she enrolled at Tbilisi State University where she studied Arabic and Georgian philology. Following a year abroad at the University of Tunis in 1988–1989, she completed her studies in 1990. She later on continued her higher education at the Institut d’Etudes Politiques in Paris, graduating in 1995 with a Diplôme d’études approfondies (DEA) in political sciences.

== Diplomatic service ==
During her university years, Meiering-Mikadze became actively involved in the Georgian independence movement. Following the restoration of Georgia's statehood and the demise of the Soviet Union in 1991, she served on the personal staff of President Eduard Shevardnadze as State Advisor from 1992 until 1995 but resigned due to the lack of integrity and accountability in the administration. Pursuing research and consulting assignments in Europe and the Middle East up to the early 2000s, Meiering-Mikadze was subsequently invited to join the Ministry of Foreign Affairs of Georgia in 2004 in the wake of the political change of November 2003. From 2004 until 2006 she was Ambassador to Jordan where she opened the first Embassy of Georgia in the Arab region outside Egypt. From Amman she covered Lebanon, Kuwait, the United Arab Emirates and Saudi Arabia, where in February 2006 she was the first ever female ambassador to be accredited. From 2007 to 2009 Meiering-Mikadze's countries of accreditation included Jordan, Lebanon and Iraq, where Georgian troops were stationed from 2003 to 2008. From 2009 to 2012 she served as Ambassador to Kuwait from where she was also accredited to the other Gulf Cooperation Council countries Saudi Arabia , Bahrain, Qatar, the United Arab Emirates and Oman. From December 2012 until 2017 she served as Ambassador to Qatar.

== Publications ==
- The tectonics of Middle Eastern geopolitics: Seismic signs in the Caucasus
- Running out of steam? The energy argument and the Black Sea
- Drifting attention: Why the Black Sea continues to matter
- Petrodollars and pandemic: GCC tourism in Georgia
- "From Dubai with Love. Post-Soviet Migration in the UAE" In: Jaber Hana et Métral France (dir.), Mondes en mouvements, Migrants et migrations au Moyen-Orient au tournant du XXIe siècle, Institut Français du Proche Orient IFPO, Beyrouth, 2005

== Honors ==
Meiering-Mikadze was awarded the Al-Wajba Decoration by the Amir of Qatar Tamim bin Hamad Al Thani in 2017 and the Presidential Order of Excellence by the President of Georgia in 2010.
