= The Wind Blows (poem) =

"The Wind Blows" is a poem by Georgian poet Galaktion Tabidze. It is a sad poem, full of imagery and sentiments, and is well known in Georgia today. The Georgian version uses alliteration, repetition and rhyme, and like all his poems, is musical. It was written in 1920.

== The poem (translation) ==
Whirls the wind, whirls the wind, whirls the wind
And the leaves whirl from wind still to wind…
Rows of trees, lines of trees bend in arch,
Where art thou, where art thou, why so far?..
How it rains, how it snows, how it snows,
Where to find, where to find... Never know!
But pursued, but pursued by your eyes
All the time, everywhere, every time!..
Distant skies drizzle thoughts mixed with mist…
Whirls the wind, whirls the wind, whirls the wind!..

Translated by Innes Merabishvili
