= Giorgi Kandelaki (politician) =

Georgian politician, former MP, member of PACE, historian, activist

Giorgi Kandelaki (Georgian: გიორგი კანდელაკი, born 5 August 1982) is a Georgian historian, civil society activist, and former politician. He served as a Member of the Parliament of Georgia from 2008 to 2020 and is currently project manager at the Soviet Past Research Laboratory (SovLab), a think tank focused on the study of Soviet totalitarian history and its instrumentalization by various actors.

== Political and activism career ==
While studying at Tbilisi State University, Kandelaki campaigned publicly against bribery in higher education and advocating for the introduction of national university entrance exams. He later co-founded the youth movement Kmara ("Enough"), which focused on anti-corruption and played a key role in Georgia's 2003 Rose Revolution. In 2005, he was briefly arrested in Belarus, in an incident that drew international attention, including by Amnesty International.

In 2008, Kandelaki was elected to the Parliament of Georgia, where he worked on foreign affairs and European integration. He served as Deputy Chairman of the Foreign Affairs Committee and later as Deputy Chair of the European Integration Committee. He was a member of the Georgian delegation to the Parliamentary Assembly of the Council of Europe (2008–2020) and the NATO Parliamentary Assembly, leading the Georgian delegation between 2008 and 2012. He also participated in the OSCE Parliamentary Assembly and was a member of the 2019 Parliamentary Working Group on Disinformation and Propaganda.

During his time in Parliament, Kandelaki advocated for greater recognition of Georgia's democratic and European traditions and for critical engagement with the Soviet past. In 2010, he initiated legislation designating 25 February as the Day of Soviet Occupation and 23 August, the anniversary of the Molotov–Ribbentrop Pact, as the Day of Remembrance of Victims of Totalitarianism. In 2012, he supported plans to transform the Stalin Museum in Gori into a Museum of Stalinism, a project halted by the subsequent Georgian Dream government.

As an MP, Kandelaki worked on transport issues and initiated the development of Kutaisi Airport as a hub for low-cost carriers.

In 2018, he introduced a bill to fully open Soviet archives, which was rejected.

== Civil society and public engagement ==
After leaving Parliament in 2020, Kandelaki became project manager at SovLab. He has edited and published works on Soviet and post-Soviet memory politics, including Georgia vs Joseph Stalin, co-authored with Georgian writer Lasha Bugadze. He has also written on the legacy of the Soviet past and its implications for contemporary politics, drawing attention to the instrumentalization of the figure of Joseph Stalin in Georgia by various actors, calling for greater recognition of the importance in memory in efforts to counter disinformation.

In other publications after leaving parliament, he has urged a focused EU and US policy to address Georgia's ongoing geopolitical drift.

In 2024, Kandelaki appeared in the Netflix documentary series Turning Point: The Bomb and the Cold War, discussing the historical context of Soviet and Russian disinformation, the Russian invasion of Georgia in 2008 and the current war in Ukraine.
