= Valerian Gaprindashvili =

Georgian poet (1888–1941)

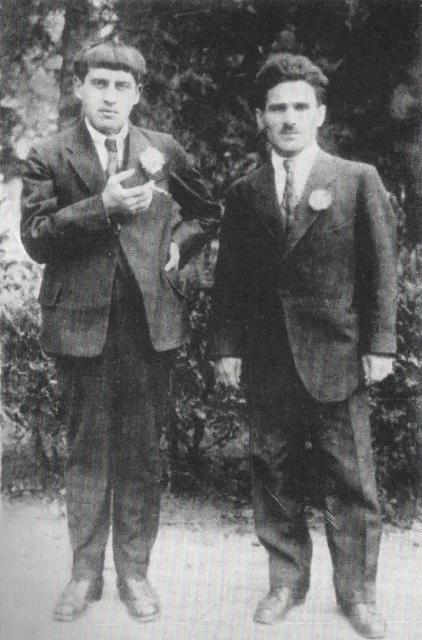
Titsian Tabidze and Valerian Gaprindashvili

Valerian Gaprindashvili (Georgian: ვალერიან გაფრინდაშვილი; December 21, 1888 – January 31, 1941) was a Georgian poet and translator whose early, Symbolist, poetry was of much influence on development of Georgian metaphor and verse.

Born in Kutaisi, he graduated from the Moscow University in 1914. Returning to Georgia, Gaprindashvili was one of the founder members of the Symbolist group Blue Horns in 1915–1916. His early, innovating poems illustrate the world as a mystic show populated with phantoms and doubles mixed with nearly "sacral" heroes from history and literature such as Cagliostro, Hamlet, Ophelia, Hannibal, etc. His first and best book, Daisebi ("Sundowns", 1919), at a time he called "the Dionysian night" of Georgia, introduced into Georgian the aesthetics of Baudelaire and Paul Valéry, as well as the mannerisms of the Russian Symbolists. Gaprindashvili significantly distanced himself from the Georgian literary classics' understanding of a poet's mission and suggested an outcast, mad and suicidal person as an eventual result of a poet's natural evolution. From the 1920s, like many of his fellow Symbolists, he faced an ideological pressure from the newly established Soviet regime which forced him to make a conciliatory move towards the standards of Soviet literature. He survived Stalinist purges of the 1930s, but his later years were unproductive.

Gaprindashvili also made translations from Eugène Edine Pottier, Goethe, Pushkin, Lermontov, Alexander Blok, Nikolay Nekrasov, Vladimir Mayakovsky, and others. He also translated and published in Russian the works of the Georgian Romanticist poet Nikoloz Baratashvili.

== Gaprindashvili's writings ==
- Gaprindashvili, Valerian. Daisebi: 1915–1918. Kutaisi: K'irchkhibis gamotsema, 1919 (გაფრინდაშვილი, ვალერიან. დაისები: 1915–1918. ქუთაისი: კირჩხიბის გამოცემა, 1919)
- Gaprindashvili, Valerian. Leksebi: t'omi p'irveli. T'pilisi: Sakhelmts'ipo gamomtsemloba, 1926 (გაფრინდაშვილი, ვალერიან. ლექსები: ტომი პირველი. ტფილისი: სახელმწიფო გამომცემლობა, 1926)
- Gaprindashvili, Valerian. Leksebi. T'pilisi: Pederatsia, 1937 (გაფრინდაშვილი, ვალერიან. ლექსები. ტფილისი: ფედერაცია, 1937).
- Gaprindashvili, Valerian. Leksebi; Levan Asatianis ts'inasit'q'vaobit da redaktsiit. Tbilisi: Sabch'ota mts'erali, 1944 (გაფრინდაშვილი, ვალერიან. ლექსები; ლევან ასათიანის წინასიტყვაობით და რედაქციით. თბილისი: საბჭოთა მწერალი, 1944).
- Gaprindashvili, Valerian. Leksebi: 1915-1941. Tbilisi: Sakartvelos sabch'ota mts'erlebis k'avshiri; gamomtsemloba "lit'erat'tura da khelovneba", 1964 (გაფრინდაშვილი, ვალერიან. ლექსები: 1915–1941. თბილისი: საქართველოს საბჭოთა მწერლების კავშირი; გამომცემლობა "ლიტერატურა და ხელოვნება", 1964)
- Gaprindashvili, Valerian. Leksebi; p'oema; targmanebi; esseebi; ts'erilebi; mts'erlis arkividan. Tbilisi: merani, 1990 (გაფრინდაშვილი, ვალერიან. ლექსები; პოემა; თარგმანები; ესსეები; წერილები; მწერლის არქივიდან. თბილისი: მერანი, 1990)

== Relevant sources ==
- Ljutskanov, Jordan. "The Image of (Black?) Sea in the Poetry of Valerian Gaprindashvili." სჯანი 24 (2023): 83-121.
