= David Kldiashvili =

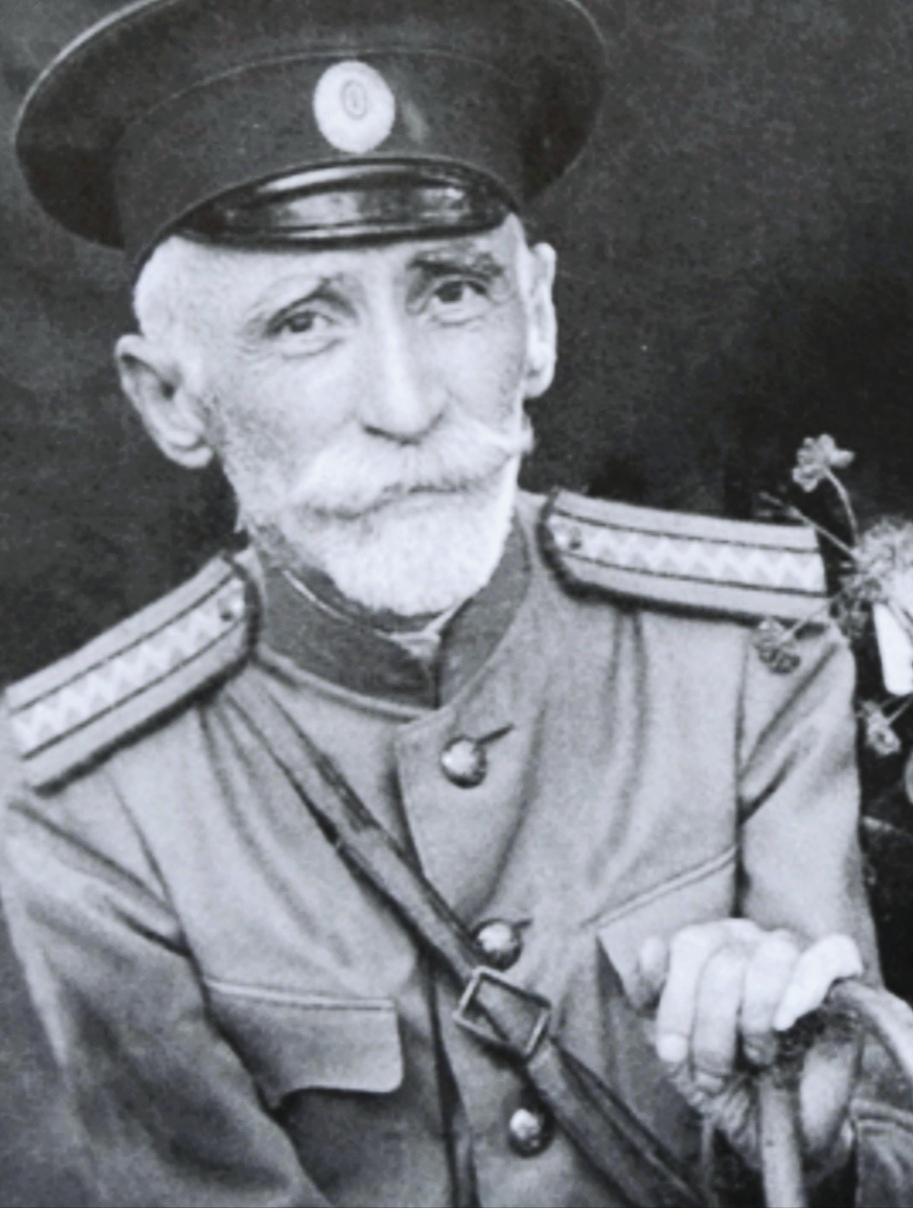
- Born: 29 August 1862; Zeda Simoneti, Kutaisi Governorate, Russian Empire
- Died: 22 April 1931 (aged 68); Zeda Simoneti, Georgian SSR, Soviet Union
- Occupations: Writer, novelist
- Writing career
- Language: Georgian
- Genre: Critical realism

David Kldiashvili (Georgian: დავით კლდიაშვილი, Davit' Kldiašvili) (August 29, 1862 – April 24, 1931) was a Georgian prose-writer whose novels and plays are concentrated on the degeneration of the country’s gentry and the miseries of the peasantry, boldly exposing the antagonisms of Georgian society.

Born to an impoverished petite noble family in the province of Imereti, Georgia (then part of the Russian Empire), he was educated at the military schools of Kiev and Moscow (1880-1882). Returning to Georgia, he joined the Russian army. While serving in Batumi, he was close to the local intelligentsia and engaged in cultural activities. Deemed to be a non-reliable officer, he was forced to resign as a non-reliable officer during the Russian Revolution of 1905. During World War I, he was remobilized in the army and served on the Ottoman front. Following the 1917 February Revolution, he was demobilized and, sick and tired, returned to his native village.

Kldiashvili’s best works belong to the first half of his life. He is said to have forgotten his Georgian while studying in Ukraine and to have had to relearn it. Nevertheless, he is regarded as an exemplary prose stylist with superb humor and gentler social satire. Since the 1880s, his translations and original works were regularly published in Georgian press. The first major novel, Solomon Morbeladze (სოლომონ მორბელაძე) appeared in 1894, followed by Samanishvili's Step-Mother (სამანიშვილის დედინაცვალი, 1897), The Misfortunes of Kamushadze (ქამუშაძის გაჭირვება, 1900), Rostom Manvelidze (როსტომ მანველიძე, 1910), and Bakula's Pigs (ბაკულას ღორები, 1920). His plays, especially Irine’s Happiness (ირინეს ბედნიერება, 1897) and The Misfortunes of Darispan (დარისპანის გასაჭირი, 1903) resemble the French comedies of the 1840s only set in an Imeretian village at the turn of the 20th century. They are typically tragicomic impregnated with what the author himself referred to as "tears mixed with a smile".

In the 1920s, Kldiashvili returned to writing and produced his memoirs On the Road of My Life (ჩემი ცხოვრების გზაზე, 1925), as well as two new novellas published between 1924 and 1926. In 1930, he was awarded the title of People's Artist of Georgia.

== See also ==
- Sergo Kldiashvili – David Kldiashvili’s son, also a writer
