= SovLab =

Non-governmental organization in Georgia

The SovLab Soviet Past Research Laboratory
- საბჭოთა წარსულის კვლევის ლაბორატორია
- Abbreviation: SovLab
- Legal status: Nonprofit organization
- Purpose: studying the country’s Soviet totalitarian past and highlighting its political, legal and moral significance
- Headquarters: Tbilisi, Georgia
- Official language: Georgian, English
- Website: sovlab.ge/ka

The SovLab Soviet Past Research Laboratory (Georgian: საბჭოთა წარსულის კვლევის ლაბორატორია) – SOVLAB – is a Georgian organization dedicated to studying the country's Soviet totalitarian past and highlighting its political, legal and moral significance. Its mission aims to preserve historical memories of Soviet repressions, like the Great purge forced deportations, and to promote conversation on defiance to Soviet legacy.

Among other things, it has contributed to developing the Museum of Repressed Writers, at the Writer's House of Georgia. The organization was founded in Tbilisi, Georgia in 2010 by historians, writers and some descendants of victims to contribute to public debate about the history of Georgia in the Soviet Union. It regularly organizes events and exhibitions, and has also published various books on Georgia's Soviet past. SovLab marks July 30 as a day for commemoration for the victims of Soviet repression.

Next to its focus on the Soviet past, SovLab has also worked to document Georgia's first democratic republic. In other projects, it has tried to trace mass graves from Soviet-era executions.

SovLab offers dramatized walking tours. The "Red Terror Tour" teaching about 1930s executions and the "Real Stalin Tour" tracing Joseph Stalin's Georgian roots. The tours use primary evidence and primary sources to teach and engage the Georgian public with Soviet history in Georgia.

SovLab has been an outspoken critic of the Georgian Dream ruling party, and has said that the Georgian government has hindered their access to Soviet archives.

Sovlab has taken grants from the US embassy and because of this Sovlab has come under criticism for anti-soviet propaganda, however such criticism is disregarded due to the nature of Sovlab, being a Soviet expository organization.

== elected publications ==
- Topography of Terror – Soviet Tbilisi, 2011, 183 pages
- Rethinking the Soviet Past – Discussions, 2011, 194 pages
- Forgotten History: Memory of Repressed Women, 2012, 423 pages
- Experience of Community Self-organization and Cooperation in Georgia Prior to the Soviet Occupation – Vol 1 and 2, 2015, 134 and 185 pages, Vol 3, 2022, 170 pages
- Political Red Cross of Georgia: A Forgotten History, 2016, 209 pages
- The Constituent Assembly of Georgia – 1919, 2017, 519 pages
- Eroba, 2017, 381 pages
- Kalaki - The City, 2021, 286 pages
- Face to Face: Soviet Terror Oral Histories – Vol 1 – 1921-1935, 2020, 459 pages
- Georgian-German Cultural Mosaic, 2021, 256 pages
- Valiko Jugeli Heavy Cross, 2022, 389 pages
