= Irma Nadirashvili =

Georgian politician (born 1970)

- ირმა ნადირაშვილი
- Born: March 15, 1970 (age 55); Signagi, Georgia
- Education: Tbilisi State University

Irma Nadirashvili (Georgian: ირმა ნადირაშვილი; born March 15, 1970)) is a Georgian politician and humanitarian activist.

== Biography ==
Nadirashvili was born on 15 March 1970, in Signagi, Georgia. She graduated from the Faculty of Oriental Studies of the Ivane Javakhishvili Tbilisi State University. After education, she worked as a correspondent for the TV company, Rustavi 2 from 1994 to 2005. She left for an Oil and Gas Agency from 2005 to 2007 and served as the Deputy Head. She was head of public relations department of the Ministry of Labor, Health and Social Affairs for in 2008 and for the next year, she was chief producer of "Postscriptum" programme of "Rustavi 2", where she worked previously.

Nadirashvili has served in several positions including head of information service of "Rustavi 2" TV company (2009–2010), Deputy Head of the Presidential (2010–2012), and of the 8th and 9th convocation Parliament of Georgia from 2012 to 2016 and from 2016 to 2020 respectively. In 2017, she became a member of the faction "European Georgia – Movement for Freedom".
