= Sandro Tsirekidze =

Georgian poet (1894–1923)

Sandro Tsirekidze (Georgian: სანდრო ცირეკიძე; 1894 – summer 1923) was a Georgian poet.

== Biography ==
Sandro Tsirekidze was born in 1894, in Kutaisi. He graduated from the school course in 1912 and then continued his studies at St. Petersburg University. Because of health problems, he moved to Kiev University. In 1916, he became one of the founder members of the Symbolist group Blue Horns.

In the 1920s, he established the writers' corporation Writers Publishing Cooperative. At the same time, he founded the publishing house Kirchkhibi. His first book, Mtvareulebi, was published in 1921.

He died in the summer 1923, and was buried at the Vera Cemetery.

== External link ==
- The website dedicated to Paolo Iashvili (in Georgian)
