= Sergo Kldiashvili =

Georgian writer

Sergo Kldiashvili (Georgian: სერგო კლდიაშვილი; 18 October 1893 – 13 October 1986) was a Georgian and Soviet prose-writer who set out to be Symbolist but then was drawn to conformist Realist prose under Soviet rule.

He was the son of the noted novelist David Kldiashvili whom Sergo would dedicate a special book in 1945. He attended the Kutaisi gymnasium which produced many of Georgia's 20th-century intellectuals, and then studied law in Moscow. Returning to Georgia, he joined Grigol Robakidze’s Symbolist group Blue Horns and wrote in a moderately The Adventures of Squire Lakhundareli (აზნაურ ლახუნდარელის თავგადასავალი, 1927), the plays A Generation of Heroes (გმირთა თაობა, 1937), Deer’s Gorge (ირმის ხევი, 1944).
