= Paolo Iashvili =

Georgian poet and symbolist (1894–1937)

Paolo Iashvili პაოლო იაშვილი
- Born: 29 June 1894; Imereti, Kutais Governorate, Russian Empire
- Died: 22 July 1937 (aged 43); Tbilisi, Georgian SSR, Soviet Union
- Occupation: poet
- Writing career
- Language: Georgian
- Genres: Poetry, Symbolism
- Notable awards: Order of the Red Banner of Labour (1936)
- Literary movement: Blue Horns

Paolo Iashvili (Georgian: პაოლო იაშვილი; 29 June 1894 – 22 July 1937) was a Georgian poet and one of the leaders of the Georgian symbolist movement. Under the Soviet Union, his obligatory conformism and the loss of his friends at the height of Joseph Stalin’s Great Purge heavily affected Iashvili, who committed suicide at the Writers’ Union of Georgia.

== Early life ==
Born near Kutaisi, western Georgia (then part of Imperial Russia), he was educated at Kutaisi, Anapa, and Paris. Returning to Georgia in 1915, he became one of the cofounders and ideologues of the Georgian symbolist group Blue Horns, and edited the literary magazine Tsisperi Qantsebi ("Blue Horns"). Early in the 1920s, Iashvili, "brilliant, polished, cultural, an amusing talker, European and good-looking" as described by his close friend and translator Boris Pasternak, emerged as a leader of Georgian post-Symbolist and experimental poetry. His devotion to mysticism and "pure art" faded under the Soviet ideological pressure in the late 1920s, when the classics of Georgian literature were effectively banned and the Georgian literary establishment was pressured into submission to socialist dogmas. Many leading writers were virtually silenced, for Iashvili becoming a publicity agent for the hydroelectric engineer Valodia Jikia. On his coming to power, Lavrenty Beria restored many Georgian writers to favor in an attempt to push them into a Soviet ideological camp. The contamination of former Symbolists by socialist dogma was a painful process, but Iashvili had finally to adapt to the Soviet doctrines, for his poetry becoming more and more ideological in essence. Beria even made him a member of the Transcaucasian Central Committee.

== The Great Purge ==
At the height of the 1930s Great Purges, he made desperate attempts to extricate himself by confessing his "errors in judgment" and reiterating his devotion to Stalin and Beria. He witnessed and even had to participate in public trials that ousted many of his associates from the Writers' Union, effectively condemning them to death. Under Beria’s pressure, he labeled the French writer and his former friend André Gide as "treacherous, black-faced Trotskyite cur". The betrayal of his ideals completely demoralized the poet. Presented by Beria with the alternative of denouncing his lifelong friend and fellow Symbolist poet Titsian Tabidze, or being arrested and tortured by the NKVD, Iashvili went to the Writers' Union office and shot himself dead on 22 July 1937. The Union’s session went on to pass a resolution stating that Iashvili posed as a litterateur while engaging in treason and espionage, and maintaining that his suicide during the course of their meeting was "a provocative act that arouses loathing and indignation in every decent gathering of Soviet writers." Only one fellow writer, Kolau Nadiradze, dared to attend Paolo Iashvili's funeral.

== Burial and Commemoration ==
Paolo Iashvili is buried in the Didube Pantheon and his legacy was remembered in a dedicated exhibition at the Museum of Repressed Writers at the Writer's House of Georgia.
