= Blue Horns =

Georgian literary group

Tsisperqantselebi (Georgian: ცისფერყანწელები; The Blue Horns) was a group of Georgian Symbolist poets and prose-writers which dominated the Georgian literature in the 1920s. It was founded as a coterie of young talented writers in Kutaisi in 1915 and was suppressed under the Soviet rule early in the 1930s.

The group originated in Kutaisi, western Georgia (then part of Imperial Russia), then a centre of Georgian avant-garde thought. Its members were the group's founder and mentor Grigol Robakidze, Titsian Tabidze, Paolo Iashvili, Valerian Gaprindashvili, Kolau Nadiradze, Shalva Apkhaidze, Nikolo Mitsishvili, Razhden Gvetadze, Levan Meunargia, Ali Arsenishvili, Sandro Tsirekidze, Giorgi Leonidze, Sergo Kldiashvili and Shalva Karmeli (Gogiashvili). Georgia's greatest 20th-century poet, Galaktion Tabidze was also affiliated with this group, but he soon left it. The leading Georgian painter of that time Lado Gudiashvili was also closely associated with the group and frequently illustrated their publications. Lado Gudiashvili has painted walls of Cafe Kimerion along with other famous painters. Cafe Kimerion was place for meetings after members of Blue Horns moved to Tbilisi in 1918.

The Blue Horns movement was a reaction against Realism and civic modes in Georgian literature. Its début took place under the fashionable banners of Symbolism and Decadence in 1916 when the literary magazine tsisperi qantsebi ("ცისფერი ყანწები"; The Blue Horns) was first published. The group quickly gained acclaim through their successful efforts to renovate and Westernize Georgian verse. In spite of the Blue Horns’ notorious attacks on the classics of Georgian literature in the group's early years, their poetry remained nationalist, yet French-oriented. Their radical experimentation thrived in the years of Georgia's independence between 1918 and 1921. Although the leading "Blue Horns" made half-hearted conformist gestures, the group came under a strong pressure and criticism after the establishment of Soviet regime in Georgia in 1921. They left the Union of Georgian Writers in October 1921 to form an alternative union, but the group was finally dissolved in 1931–2. Many of them reconciled with the Soviet authorities and were praised for having "liberated themselves from decadence" and for their "significant role in the evolution of Georgian Soviet literature". Yet, the fate of the leading "Blue Horns" was tragic: Shalva Karmeli died of tuberculosis at the age of 24 in 1923 and his grave at the Kutaisi Archangel Church was soon razed by the Bolsheviks; Titsian Tabidze and Nikolo Mitsishvili were executed and Paolo Iashvili shot himself during the Great Purge in 1937; Sergo Kldiashvili and Kolau Nadiradze were saved only by chance: their NKVD interrogator was himself arrested and the files mislaid; Grigol Robakidze had earlier defected to Germany escaping the inevitable arrest; the purge of his friends and an obligatory conformism plunged Galaktion into depression and alcoholism, leading to his suicide in 1959. The only members of the Blue Horns movement to survive the Great Purge was Giorgi Leonidze and Kolau Nadiradze.
