= Titsian Tabidze =

Georgian poet

ტიციანი Titsiani
- Born: 21 March 1895; Chkvishi, Kutais Governorate, Russian Empire
- Died: 16 December 1937 (aged 42) (killed by NKVD); Tbilisi, Georgian SSR, Soviet Union or Siberia
- Occupation: poet
- Spouse: Nino Makashvili
- Children: Nita Tabidze
- Relatives: Galaktion Tabidze
- Writing career
- Language: Georgian
- Genres: poetry, symbolism
- Movement: Blue Horns

Titsian Tabidze (Georgian: ტიციან ტაბიძე, simply referred to as Titsiani; Georgian: ტიციანი) (21 March [O.S. 9 March] 1890 – 16 December 1937), was a Georgian poet and one of the leaders of the Georgian symbolist movement. He fell victim to Joseph Stalin's Great Purge, was arrested and executed on trumped-up charges of treason. Tabidze was a close friend of the well-known Russian writer Boris Pasternak, who translated his poetry into Russian.

== Early life ==
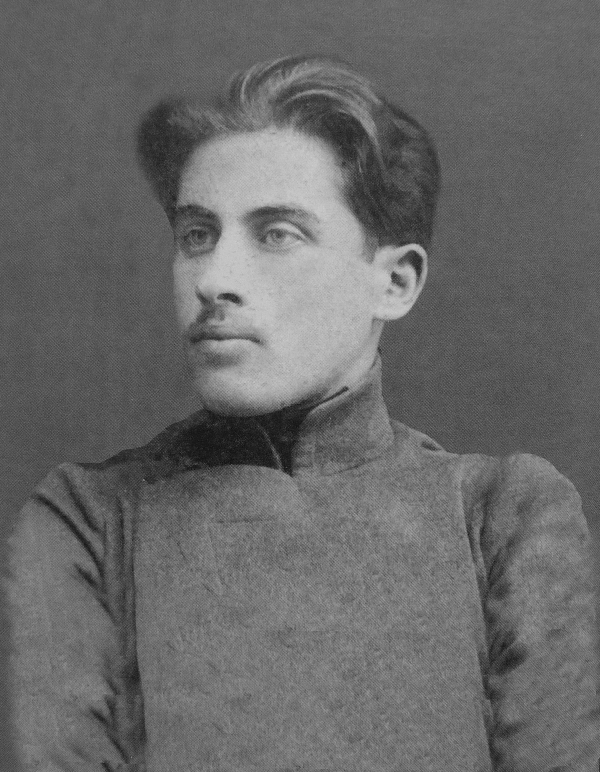
Titsian Tabidze

Tabidze was the son of a Georgian Orthodox priest in the province of Imereti, western Georgia, then part of Kutais Governorate, Imperial Russia. Educated at the University of Moscow, he returned to Georgia to become one of the cofounders and main ideologues of the Blue Horns, a coterie of young Georgian symbolists founded in 1916. Later, Tabidze's work combined European and Asian trends into eclectic poetry which significantly leaned towards Futurism and Dadaism, while also paying tribute to the classics of Georgian literature, which had been attacked by the early Blue Horns. After the establishment of Soviet rule in Georgia in 1921, he chose a conciliatory line towards the Bolshevik regime, but did not abandon his Futuristic and decadent style despite half-hearted attempts at praising the "builders of socialism". His poetry on the history of the Caucasus, particularly Imam Shamil, propounded "an avant-garde aesthetic of transgressive sanctity".

Tabidze was a close friend of the Russian writer Boris Pasternak and the correspondent in his Letters to Georgian Friends. Pasternak knew Titsian as "a reserved and complicated soul, wholly attracted to the good and capable of clairvoyance and self-sacrifice", and translated his poetry into Russian.

== The Great Purge ==
Early in 1936, the Soviet press published several articles critical of formalism in the arts. Titsian Tabidze and fellow Georgian poets Konstantine Gamsakhurdia, Simon Chikovani, and Demna Shengelaia came under fire for their "failure to free themselves from the old traditions and forge closer contact with the people." Many poets and writers, horrified by the emerging political purges in the Soviet Union, accepted the criticism and made public recantations. Tabidze refused to do so and counterattacked.

Foreseeing the consequences of Tabidze's defiance, Pasternak, in a private letter, urged his friend to just ignore the attacks on formalism: "Rely only on yourself. Dig more deeply with your drill without fear or favor, but inside yourself, inside yourself. If you do not find the people, the earth and the heaven there, then give up your search, for then there is nowhere else to search."

== Arrest and execution ==
On 10 October 1937 Tabidze was expelled from the Union of Georgian Writers and then arrested by the NKVD. He was charged with anti-Soviet agitation and betraying the Motherland. Broken under torture and denial of sleep, Tabidze "confessed" to all the charges. When interrogators demanded to know the names of his co-conspirators, Tabidze, with bitter sarcasm, named only the 18th-century poet Besiki. Within two months he was shot, although no announcement of this was leaked.

== Legacy ==
Tabidze's arrest and disappearance was a shock to all who knew him. His lifelong friend and fellow symbolist poet, Paolo Iashvili, had already been forced to denounce several of his fellow poets as enemies of the people. But after Tabidze's arrest, Iashvili shot himself with a hunting rifle inside the Writers’ Union in Tbilisi.

For almost two decades, however, Tabidze's family and friends believed that he was still alive. In 1940, Boris Pasternak helped Nina Tabidze draft a petition to Lavrenty Beria on her husband's behalf. However, it was not until the mid-1950s, during the Khrushchev thaw, that the truth about Tabidze's fate emerged.

Tabidze's poetry has been translated into many languages, including Russian and English. Russian poets Boris Pasternak and Osip Mandelstam translated him into Russian. Rebecca Ruth Gould's translations of Titsian Tabidze into English have appeared in Seizure, The Brooklyn Quarterly, Tin House, Prairie Schooner, and Metamorphoses. Gould also interviewed Titsian Tabidze's daughter Nita in the Tbilisi home Nita shared with her father in 2010.

== Links ==
- T. Tabidze. A Poem Landslide (audio) (English)
- T. Tabidze. Okroqana (Golden Field) (audio) (English)
- T. Tabidze. Slowly Walking To and Fro (audio) (English)
