= Giorgi Leonidze =

- Giorgi Leonidze
- Born: 27 December 1899; Patardzeuli, Kakheti, Russian Empire
- Died: 9 August 1966 (aged 66); Tbilisi, Georgian SSR
- Resting place: Mtatsminda Pantheon, Tbilisi
- Occupations: Writer, poet
- Writing career
- Literary movement: Symbolism

Giorgi Leonidze (Georgian: გიორგი ლეონიძე; 27 December 1899 – 9 August 1966) was a Georgian poet, prose writer, and literary scholar.

== Biography ==
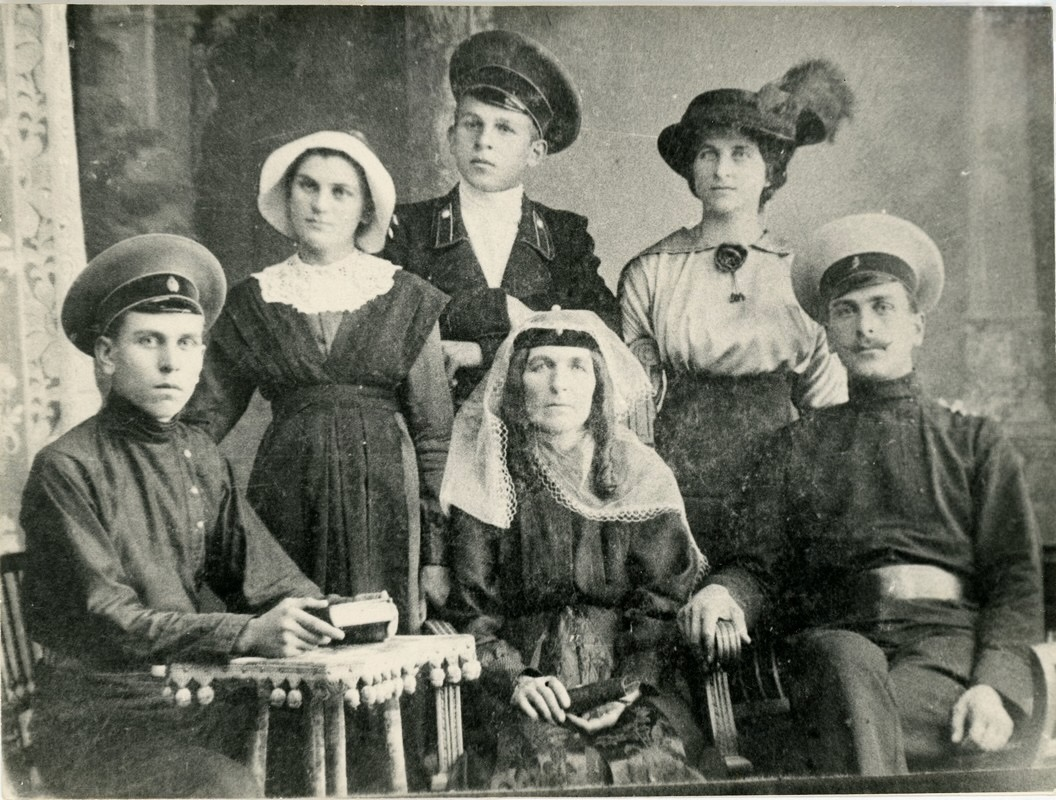
Leonidze (top-center) with his mother and siblings

Leonidze was born into Georgian nobility in the village of Patardzeuli, located in the eastern Georgian province of Kakheti. He graduated from the Tbilisi Theological Seminary in 1918 and continued his studies at the Tbilisi State University. His first poems appeared in Georgian press in 1911, and then, briefly collaborated with the Symbolist group Blue Horns. In 1925, he began writing nature lyrics focused on his native Kakheti, turning further towards Romanticism.

Throughout the Soviet period, he adapted to the political whims of the government authorities by writing more historical and patriotic poetry, often using medieval imagery. He quickly established himself as one of the most popular poets of Georgia, but, when the purges of the 1930s took lives of many of his fellow writers and his own brother, microbiologist Leon Leonidze, he was forced to direct his talents into panegyrics to Joseph Stalin. Scholar of Georgian literature Donald Rayfield described one unfinished 1936 epic, Stalin: Childhood and Youth, as "remarkable for its simulated verve and a total of absence of biographic details, factual or invented."

Leonidze also wrote scrupulous literary studies of earlier Georgian poets such as Besiki and Baratashvili, and produced prose based on his childhood memoirs and experiences, including The Tree of Desire (ნატვრის ხე), which Tengiz Abuladze adapted in 1976 as the second part of his famous film trilogy. In his later years, Leonidze used his wealth to benefit his native village and presided over the Institute of Georgian Literature at the Georgian Academy of Sciences from 1958 until his death in 1966. He is buried at the Mtatsminda Pantheon at Tbilisi.

The Giorgi Leonidze State Museum of Literature in Tbilisi continues to carry his name.

== Awards ==
- Stalin Prize second class (1941)
- Stalin Prize first class (1950)
- Stalin Prize second class (1952)
- Shota Rustaveli Prize (1969)
