= Olga Guramishvili-Nikoladze =

Georgian biologist and educator

- ოლღა გურამიშვილი-ნიკოლაძე
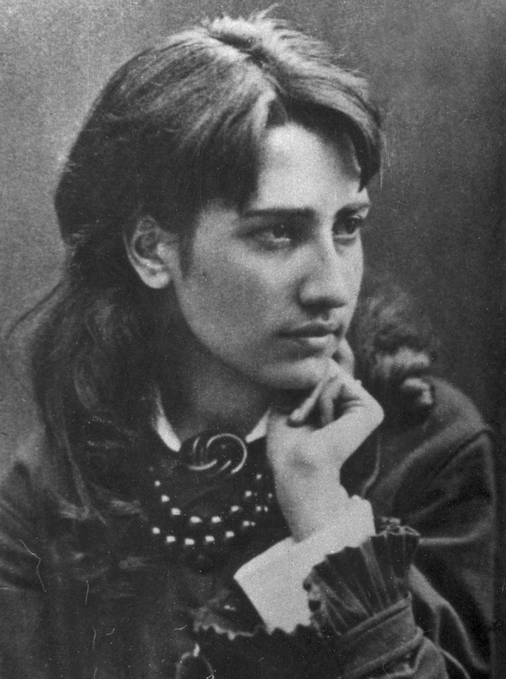
- Guramishvili, 1878
- Born: 29 July 1855; Avchala, Caucasus Viceroyalty, Russian Empire
- Died: 24 May 1940 (aged 84); Tbilisi, Georgian Soviet Socialist Republic
- Other name: Olga Alexandres asuli Guramishvili
- Occupations: educator, biologist
- Years active: 1875–1912
- Spouse: Niko Nikoladze (m. 1883)
- Children: 3
- Family: Guramishvili

Olga Guramishvili-Nikoladze (Georgian: ოლღა გურამიშვილი-ნიკოლაძე, 29 July 1855 – 24 May 1940) was a Georgian biologist and educator. One of the first women to study abroad, she earned a degree in pedagogy and brought advanced teaching methods to Georgia. In 1886, she founded a girls' school, and later a women's gymnasium, in Didi Jikhaishi. At the school, she introduced sericulture to the country and taught her students mechanical knitting and weaving. In her later career, she served as the chair of the school board in Poti from 1894 to 1912. She is remembered for her contributions to education and a street in Tbilisi bears her name.

== Early life ==
Olga Alexandres asuli Guramishvili (Olga daughter of Alexander Guramishvili) (Note: Formally, in the Georgian system of patronymics, asuli (Georgian: ასული), denotes "daughter of", whereas dze (Georgian: ძე) means "son of").) was born on 29 July 1855 Lower Avchala, a northern suburb of Tiflis (known after 1936 as Tbilisi), in the Caucasus Viceroyalty of the Russian Empire into an old noble House of Guramishvili, to Prince Alexander Guramishvili (b. 1825) and his wife, Princess Ketevan Tumanishvili (b. 1825). She was related to the Georgian poet Davit Guramishvili, and a relative and god-daughter of Princess Olga Guramishvili-Chavchavadze, a Georgian literary figure, married to Ilia Chavchavadze. After completing her secondary education, Guramishvili attended the Tiflis Women's Gymnasium. Hoping to become an agronomy teacher, upon completing her high school studies, she attended biology lectures with Professor Tarkhnishvili. At the time, there were few opportunities for university study for women in the Russian Empire, and Guramishvili dreamed of going abroad to further her education in Switzerland. Her father was against the plan, but her mother encouraged Guramishvili, who obtained the passport of Ephrosine Nikoladze, older sister of Niko Nikoladze, and made her way to Zürich in 1872.

In the early 1870s, Switzerland was a gathering place for Russian revolutionaries who were preaching the socialist doctrine. Guramishvili, one of the first Georgian women to study abroad, became involved in the student movement and became active with other Georgian women students like Fefo Eliozishvili, Ekaterine Melikishvili, Pelagia Natsvlishvili, Ekaterine "Kato" Japaridze (sister of Agrippina Japaridze), Olimpiada Nikoladze and Mariam Tsereteli. When Giorgi Tsereteli founded an organization known as the უღელი საზოგადოება (Yoke Society), supported by Sergey Meskhi and Niko Nikoladze in 1873, Guramishvili became a member of the group. Its stated purpose was for students abroad to study socialist doctrine to liberate their homeland and form a republican state. In 1874, the Tsarist regime issued a decree requiring woman students to leave the University of Zurich and return to their homelands. Instead, Guramishvili left with Niko to study at the University of Geneva, where members of the Yoke became more closely aligned with radical philosophies the intelligentsia in Western Europe and Russia.

Though Niko was interested in Guramishvili romantically, she was enjoying her freedom and studies. Niko left Geneva and went to Paris, where he married a Polish woman, Bogumila Zemianskaia (also Bogumiła Ziemiańska), who had lived for a while in his hometown, Kutaisi. They had three children — a son who died young, and two daughters, Nino and Elizabeth, known as "Lolo". He and Guramishvili began a correspondence at this period, which would last throughout their lives. Becoming a socialist, Guramishvili regularly attended the International Workingmen's Association section meetings where they discussed such issues as nationalism, internationalism, women's suffrage and equality, as well as the socio-economic and political policies of the Paris Commune. Many of the lectures focused on the doctrine of Karl Marx. In his memoir, revolutionary figure, Nikolai Morozov, wrote that Kato Nikoladze, Mashiko Tsereteli and Guramishvili were to be found as a trio at almost every gathering of Geneva's international community or French communists. After completing her degree in pedagogy, Guramishvili briefly lived in Saint Petersburg, but was expelled from Russia for her involvement with Nikolay Mikhaylovsky and the Narodniks.

== Career ==
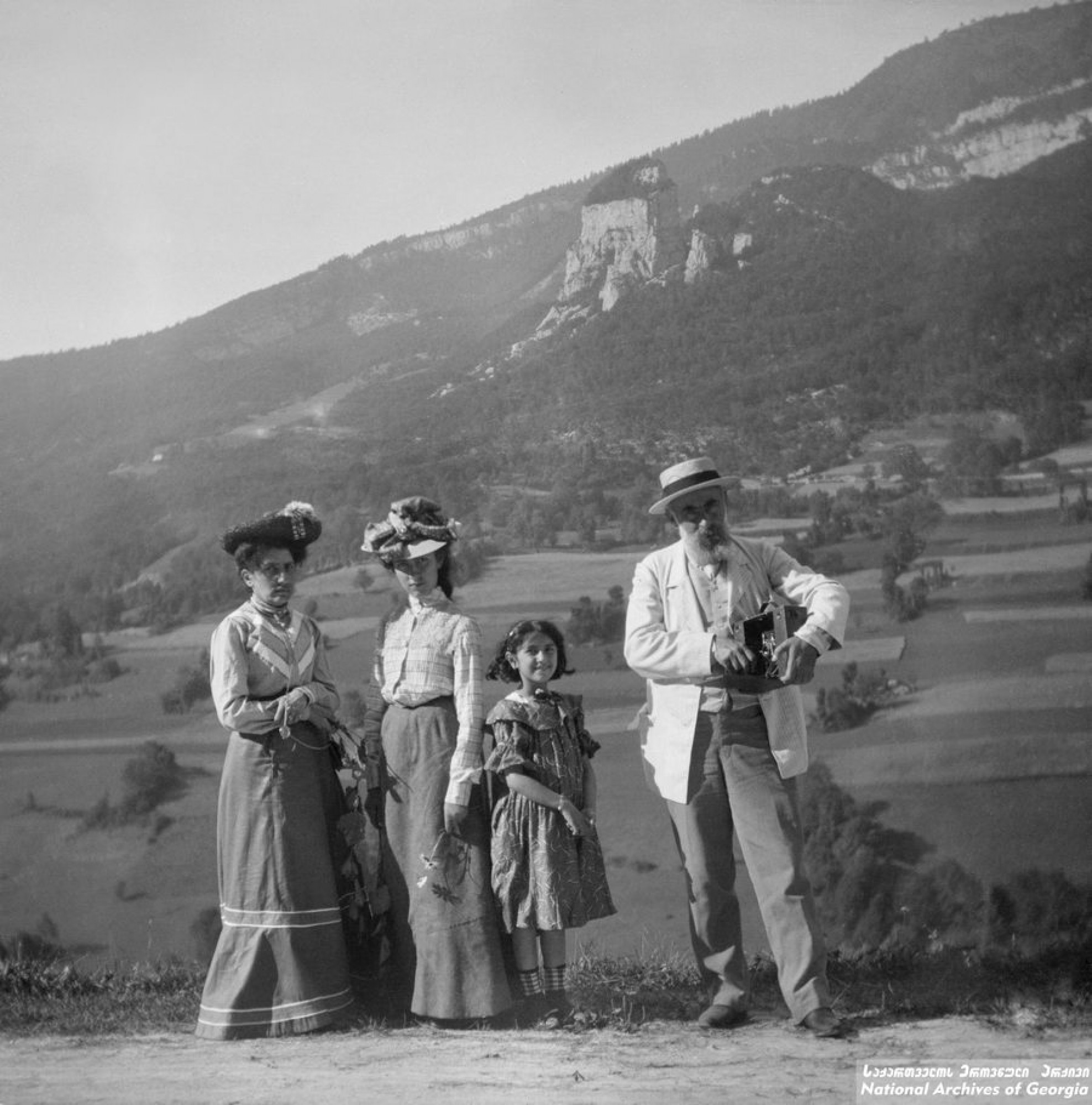
Olga with her husband Niko and their daughters in Allèves (Savoy, France). Photo by their son George Nikoladze, 1902

Returning to Georgia in 1875, Guramishvili began working at the boys' gymnasium operated by Iakob Gogebashvili. Initially, the other instructors opposed the hiring of a woman, but her training soon earned her admiration. Around the same time, Niko, who had been living between Paris and Tiflis since 1871, establishing and writing for a number of revolutionary periodicals, returned to Georgia. After teaching at the gymnasium for five years, Guramishvili left in 1880 and accompanied Niko when he was arrested and exiled to Stavropol, though he did not refrain from his radical publishing activities. In 1881, they relocated to Saint Petersburg, though they were unable to marry. Divorce was a difficult process in the period and required permission from the Holy Synod. Niko and Zemianskaia were formally separated in the early summer of 1883, and on 29 July, he and Guramishvili married at the Kashveti Church in Tiflis. The following year, their daughter Rusudan (1884–1981) was born in Saint Petersburg.

In 1886 or 1887, the family moved to Didi Jikhaishi, (sometimes known as Didi-Dzhikhaishi), in the Imereti region of western Georgia. Guramishvili opened a girls' school which introduced new teaching methods, bringing in teachers from Tiflis to help advance her ideas. One of these was Nino Tkeshelashvili, who she hired as a teacher for Russian language. The couples' other children, Giorgi (1888–1931) and Tamar (1892–1939) were born during this time. In 1894, she opened a women's gymnasium, which focused on agricultural sciences. Bringing in silk worms from Lyon, France, she taught sericulture as well as machine knitting and weaving to her students. Later that year, they moved to Poti, where Niko served as mayor until 1912. While they were living in Poti, Guramishvili continued her focus on education, serving as the chair of the school board.

By 1916, (Note: It is unclear when the family moved to Saint Petersburg. Rusudan graduated from the Tiflis Women's Gymnasium in 1904 and then enrolled at the Women's Pedagogical Institute of Saint Petersburg, graduating in 1909. She married in Saint Petersburg in 1913 and had her son, Nikolai Nikoladze-Polievktov there in 1915. Her younger sister, Tamara graduated in 1916–1917 from the Women's Pedagogical Institute, indicating that she had likely enrolled four years previously.) Niko was working in Saint Petersburg, having taken a post on the board of Russkaia volia (Russian Liberty), a leading left-leaning journal. When the February Revolution began, the family immediately supported the creation of the Provisional Committee of the State Duma and both daughters began working as telephone operators for the new Soviet leadership. In the spring, Niko and Guramishvili returned to Tiflis, where he became one of the founders of the National Democratic Party. On 5 September, Rusudan left newly renamed Petrograd with her son to return to the family home in Didi Jikhaishi and avoid the turmoil of the revolution. She began working as a teacher at the gymnasium her mother had founded. When Georgia gained its independence in 1918, Niko became a member of the Constituent Assembly and served until 1921. When the Soviets invaded Georgia, the family moved to London for three years, before returning to Tiflis, where Niko died in 1928.

== Death and legacy ==
Guramishvili died on 24 May 1940 in Tbilisi. In 1957, her remains were moved to the Mtatsminda Pantheon where her husband Niko had been buried. She is remembered as one of the first Georgian women to study abroad and introduce pedagogy to Georgia. More than 7,000 of the letters exchanged by Guramishvili and Nikoladze are extant and housed in an archive in the United States. A small portion of them was published as პიშუ ტებე by I. A. Meskhi. In 2018, the Tbilisi City Council renamed a section of Theodore Afanasiev Street in the Isani District of the city in her honor. Her daughter Rusudan became a chemist and married Russian historian Mikhail Polievktov. Giorgi became a well-known mathematician. Tamar, an academic, physiologist and one of the first women in Georgia to participate in international sporting events, married one of Giorgi's colleagues, Nikoloz Muskhelishvili.

== See also ==
- Elizabeth Orbeliani
- Anastasia Tumanishvili-Tsereteli
- Ekaterine Gabashvili
- Dominika Eristavi
