= Rusudana Nikoladze =

Georgian chemist and educator (1884–1981)

- რუსუდან ნიკოლაძე
- Born: 17 December 1884; Saint Petersburg, Russian Empire
- Died: 9 September 1981 (aged 96); Tbilisi, Georgian Soviet Socialist Republic
- Education: Tiflis Gymnasium for Women
- Alma mater: Women’s Pedagogical Institute; Saint Petersburg University
- Occupations: Inorganic chemist and educator
- Employer(s): Saint Petersburg Women's Pedagogical Institute; Institute of Chemical Defense; V.I. Lenin Georgian Polytechnical Institute
- Spouse: Mikhail Aleksandrovich Polievktov (m. 1913)
- Children: 1, Nikolai Mikhailovich Polievktov-Nikoladze
- Relatives: Giorgi Nikoladze (brother); Tamara Nikoladze (sister); Nikoloz Muskhelishvili (brother-in-law); Irakli Tsereteli (paternal cousin)
- Family: Nikoladze family (paternal); Guramishvili family (maternal)
- Awards: Order of Lenin (1947 and 1953); Order of the Red Banner of Labour (1965); Certificate of Merit from the Supreme Soviet of the Georgian Soviet Socialist Republic (1960 and 1965)

Rusudana Nikolaevna Nikoladze (Georgian: რუსუდან ნიკოლაძე, 17 December 1884 – 9 September 1981) was a Georgian inorganic chemist, educator and member of the aznauri class and intelligentsia, as part of the old Georgian noble Nikoladze family.

== Family and early life ==
Nikoladze was born on 17 December 1884 in Saint Petersburg, while her parents were living in the Russian Empire after her father had been expelled to Stavropol in 1880. Her father was writer and revolutionary Niko Nikoladze (1843–1928) and her mother was Niko's second wife, biologist and educator Olga Guramishvili-Nikoladze (1855–1940), of the noble Guramishvili family. Nikoladze and her parents were permitted to return to Georgia in 1886, settling in the western village of Didi-Dzhikhaishi.

Nikoladze had three half-siblings from her fathers first marriage and two younger full siblings.

- Nikoladze's younger brother Giorgi Nikoladze (1888–1931) was a mathematician who worked as a professor at Tbilisi State University and co-founded the Georgian Mathematical Union. He married Georgetta Gambashidze.
- Nikoladze's younger sister Tamara Nikoladze (1892–1939) was a graduate of the Women's Pedological Institute and married Georgian mathematician Nikoloz Muskhelishvili (1891–1976).

In 1900, the Nikoldaze family travelled to visit the Exposition Universelle in Paris, France. They later visited the French Alps in Aix-les-Bains, the Simplon Tunnel in the Alps and the Gotthard Tunnel in Switzerland, to teach the children about modern European engineering and science.

Nikoldaze married Russian historian Mikhail Aleksandrovich Polievktov in the summer of 1913. They had a son together, Nikolai Mikhailovich Polievktov-Nikoladze, born in 1915. Their son became a nuclear physicist.

== Career ==
Nikoladze was educated at the Tiflis Gymnasium for Women (Pervaia Tiflisskaia zhenskaia gimnaziia) from 1898 to 1904. She spoke Georgian, English, French, German and Russian.

Nikoldaze choose to study chemistry at university to contribute to the industrialisation and modernisation of Georgia. She began studying at the Women's Pedagogical Institute (WPI, now Herzen University) in Saint Petersburg, in 1904, achieving a diploma in physics and inorganic chemistry. During her diploma studies, Nikoldaze worked on the theory of chemical bonding, taught evening science classes to both male and female workers from Obukhov State Plant and a local glassmaking factory, and participated in left-wing student demonstrations, sometimes with her paternal cousin Irakli Tsereteli. Despite a pull to radical revolutionary activity, Nikoladze ultimately decided to focus on her scientific career, particularly after an encounter with Nikolai Morozov.

From 1910, Nikoldaze attended Saint Petersburg University, studying engineering and mathematics, and graduating in 1913. After earning her degree, Nikoladze returned to the Women's Pedagogical Institute, organising new laboratories and working as a technical assistant and junior teacher.

By 1914, Nikoladze had married, and travelled with her husband to archives in England, France and Switzerland for their respective research. They returned to Russia after the outbreak of World War I, with Nikoladze abandoning her research to work supporting the war effort in a pharmacy attached to a hospital and then at the Institute of Chemical Defense. In 1917, Nikoladze moved to her parents home of Didi-Dzhikhaishi, where she co-founded the local gymnasium and taught there until 1920.

In 1920, Nikoladze contributed to the Georgian Technical Society's first bilingual (Russian-Georgian) Dictionary of Technical Terms for science and technology, alongside Vasil Kakabadze, Giorgi Gedevanishvili, David Berekashvili, Irakli Mchedlishvili, Ivane Beridze, Mikheil Shalamberidze and her brother Giorgi. In 1920, Nikoldze also founded the V.I. Lenin Georgian Polytechnical Institute (now part of the Georgian Technical University) in Tbilisi with her brother Giorgi. She became Head of the Department of Inorganic and Organic Chemistry and worked there for the rest of her career.

Alongside teaching, Nikoladze also published scholarly works on organic chemistry, inorganic chemistry and chemistry methods. With D. Gvaramadze, she published a new work on Georgian language chemistry terminology in 1970.

== Russian Revolution ==
Nikoladze and her husband were enthusiastic supporters of the Russian Revolution, although she did not become a member of the Communist Party of Georgia.

After her husband conducted interviews with leaders of the February Revolution of 1917 for the Society for the Study of the Revolution, Nikoladze secretly kept copies the interview manuscripts, which she later allowed to be translated into English for historians to use in research. Nikoladze additionally aimed to "preserve the family memory and transmit pre-revolutionary intellectual culture of Georgia to her son." Her archive of family papers is held at the University of Notre Dame.

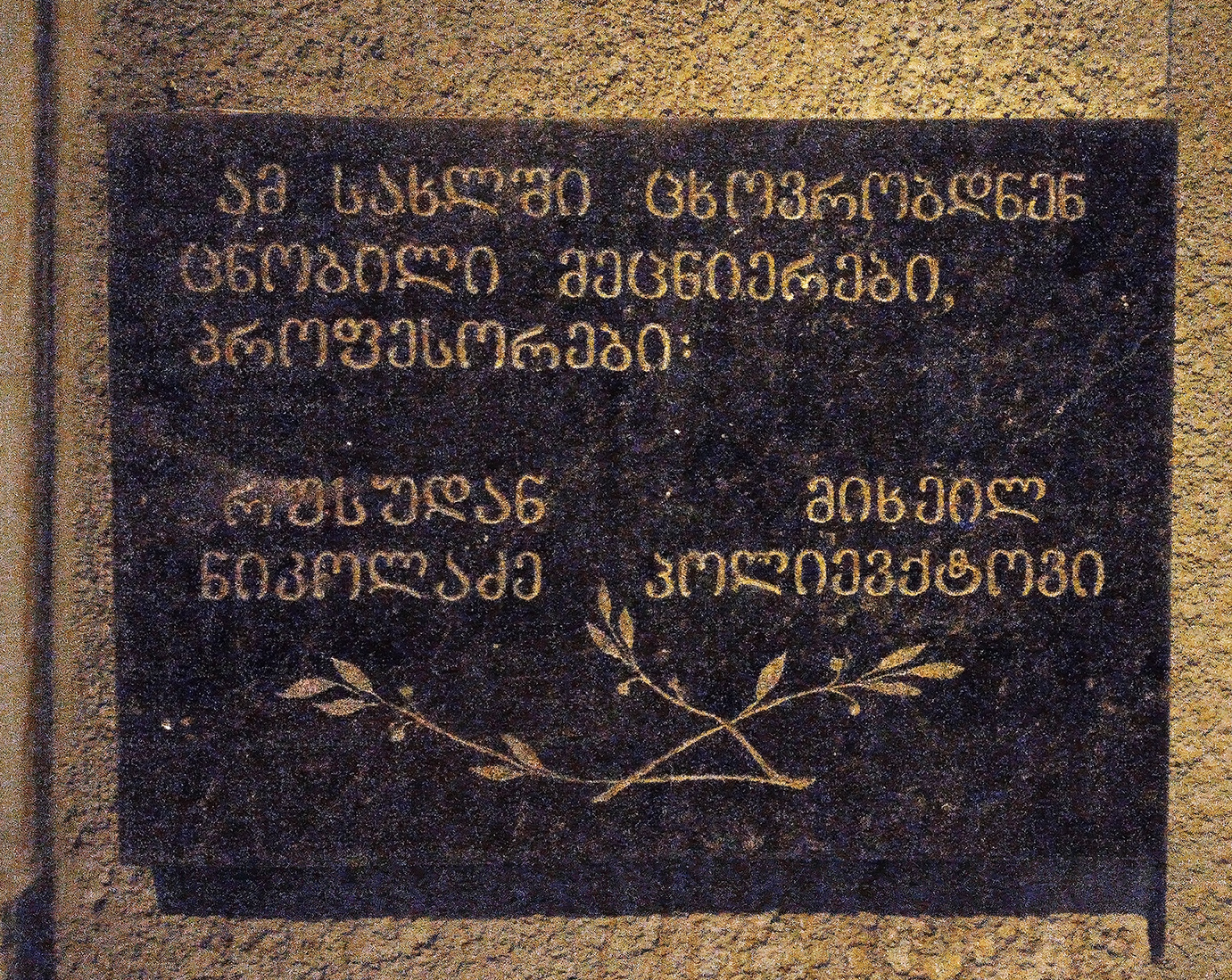
Plaque to Rusudana Nikoladze and Mikhail Polievktov on Tabidze Street, Tbilisi

== Death ==
Nikoladze died on 9 September 1981 in Tbilisi, Georgian Soviet Socialist Republic, aged 96. She is commemorated by a memorial plaque for her and her husband on Tabidze Street, Tbilisi.

== Awards ==
- Order of Lenin (1947 and 1953)
- Order of the Red Banner of Labour (1965)
- Certificate of Merit from the Supreme Soviet of the Georgian Soviet Socialist Republic (1960 and 1965)
- Giorgi Nikoladze Prize (1978)
