= Nikoladze family =

Georgian noble family

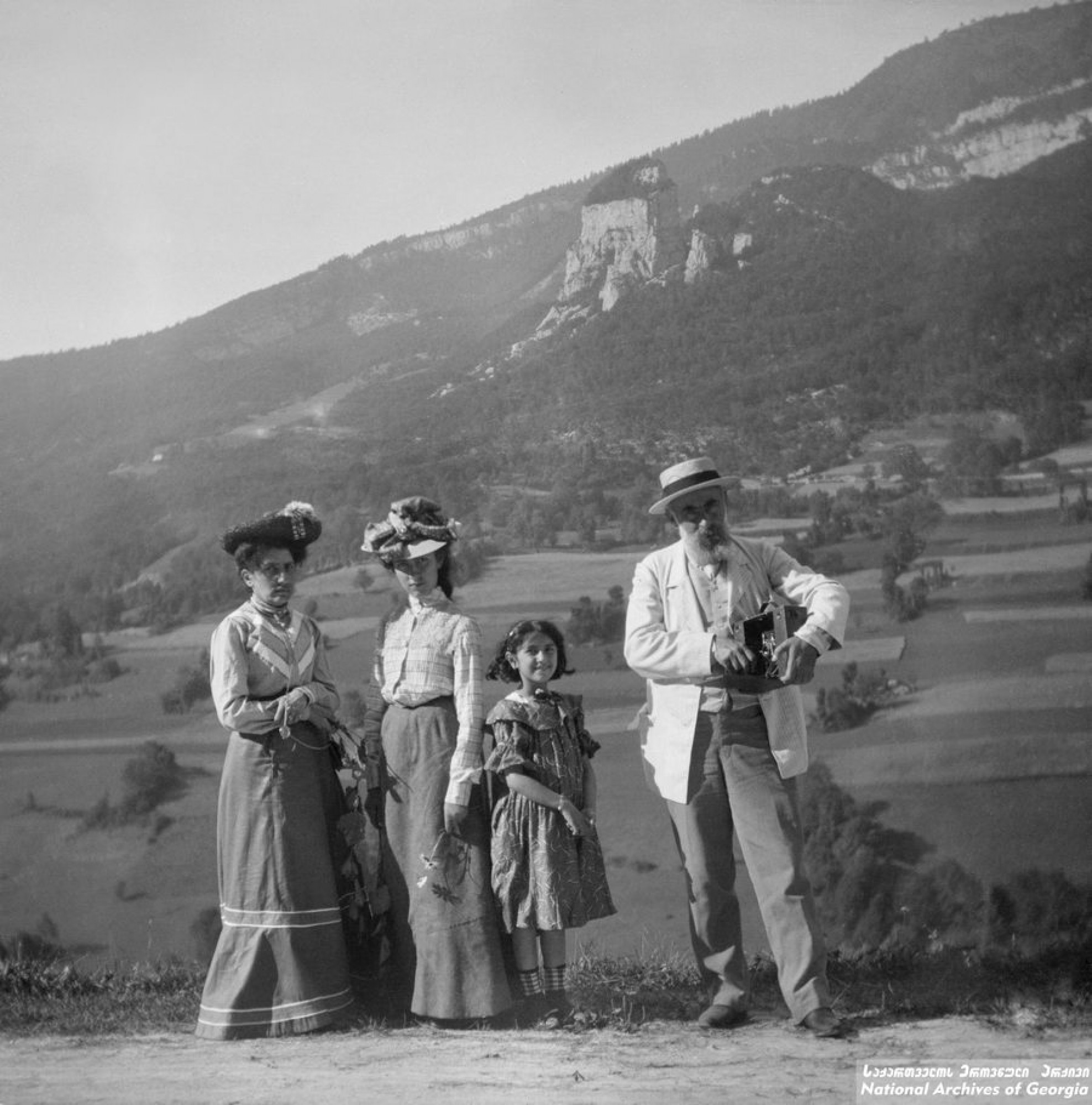
Niko Nikoladze and his family in Allèves (Savoy, France), 1902

The Nikoladze family (Georgian: ნიკოლაძე) is an old Georgian noble family (aznauri) known since 14th to 16th century, originating in the Kingdom of Imereti.

== History ==
The first mention of the name dates back to 14th century in the monastery of Tbeti (The Tbethi Synodal Records) under the name of "Nikolasdze" (ნიკოლასძე). The Nikoladze family was also listed in the documents of the Catholicate of Abkhazia (Western Georgia). After the annexation of Georgia by the Russian Empire in 1801, the family became incorporated into the Russian nobility. The Nikoladze family was included in the list of nobles of Georgia in 1860 in the so-called "Barkhatnaia Kniga" published in Saint Petersburg.

The family became a prominent part of Georgian intelligentsia from the 1860s to the 1980s, with members of the family playing critical roles in the economic, political, and social transformation of Georgia during the periods of late Imperial Russia, the Democratic Republic of Georgia, and Soviet Georgia.

Niko Nikoladze is well-known for his contributions to Georgian journalism and intellectualism, and he was the first Georgian to receive a doctorate from a Western European university. His wife, Olga Guramishvili-Nikoladze, was a notable educator that introduced polytechnic education to her school, and their son Giorgi Nikoladze was a notable mathematician, professor, translator, and metallurgist. Salome Zourabichvili, the fifth president of Georgia, is the great-granddaughter of Niko Nikoladze.

== Notable members ==
- Niko Nikoladze (1843–1928), writer, m./div. Bogumila Zemaianskaia; m. Olga Guramishvili-Nikoladze (1855–1940), biologist
  - Unnamed son (died in infancy; of first marriage)
  - Elizabeth "Lolo" Nikoladze (of first marriage), m. Camille Huysmans (1871–1968), prime minister of Belgium
  - Nino Nikoladze (1876–1959; of first marriage), m. Ivan Zourabichvili (1872–1940), politician
    - Georges Zourabichvili (1898–1944), economist and philosopher, m. Nathalie von Pelken (1902–1952)
      - Hélène Zourabichvili (1929–2023), historian and politician, m. Louis Édouard Carrère d'Encausse (1928–2023)
        - Emmanuel Carrère (born 1957), author, screenwriter and film director
        - Marina Carrère d'Encausse (born 1961), physician and author
      - Nicolas Zourabichvili (born 1936), composer
        - François Zourabichvili (1965–2006), philosopher
    - Levan Zourabichvili (1906–1975), engineer, m. Zeinab Kedia (1921–2016)
      - Salome Zourabichvili (born 1952), fifth president of Georgia, m./div. Nicolas Gorjestani (born 1946)
        - Teymouraz Gorjestani (born 1981), diplomat
        - Kéthévane Gorjestani (born 1984), journalist
      - Othar Zourabichvili, physician
  - Rusudan Nikoladze (1884–1981; of second marriage), chemist, m. Mikhail Polievktov (1872–1942), scientist
  - Giorgi Nikoladze (1888–1931; of second marriage), mathematician, m. Georgetta Gambashidze
  - Tamara Nikoladze (1892–1939; of second marriage), m. Nikoloz Muskhelishvili (1891–1976), mathematician
- Koka Nikoladze (born 1989), composer
- Iakob Nikoladze (1876–1951), artist

== See also ==
- Zourabichvili family
