= Niko Nikoladze =

Georgian writer (1843–1928)

Niko Nikoladze ნიკო ნიკოლაძე
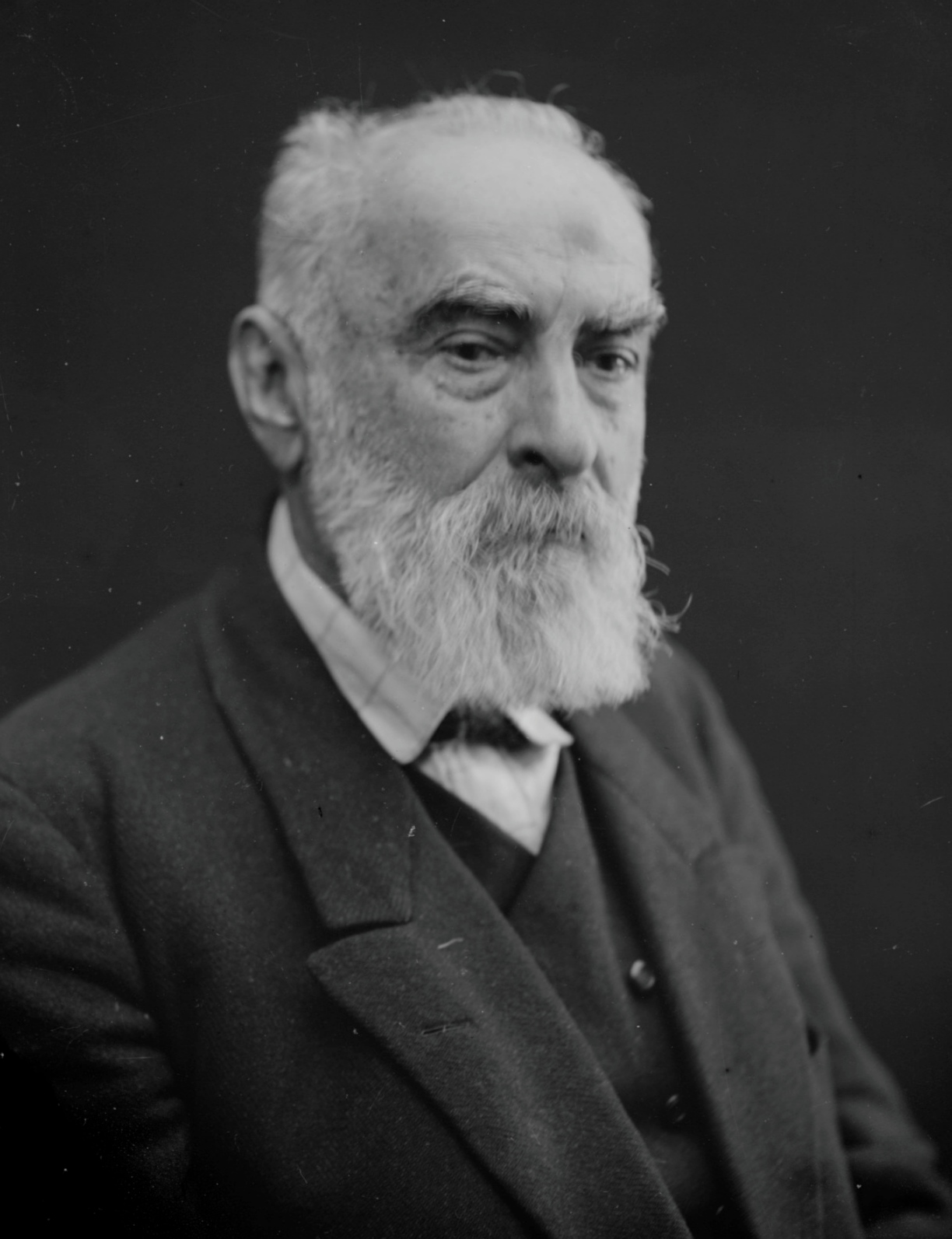
- Born: 27 September 1843; Kutaisi, Imereti, Russian Empire
- Died: 5 June 1928 (aged 84)
- Occupations: Writer, thinker, statesman
- Spouse(s): Bogumila Zemaianskaia Olga Guramishvili-Nikoladze (m. 1883)
- Children: 6, including Giorgi
- Relatives: Nikoladze family

Niko Nikoladze (Georgian: ნიკო ნიკოლაძე, 27 September 1843 – 5 June 1928) was a Georgian writer and public figure primarily known for his contributions to the development of Georgian liberal journalism and his involvement in various economic and social projects of the time.

== Biography ==
Nikoladze and his family

Niko Nikoladze was born in Kutaisi, western Georgia (then part of the Russian Empire) into petite noble family of Nikoladze. He was the son of a merchant, Iakob Nikoladze (1798–1871) and his wife, Princess Elizabeth Lortkipanidze (1826–1878). He had three sisters: Anastasia, Olimpiada (d. 1883) and Efrosinya. After the graduation from Kutaisi Gymnasium (1860), he enrolled the Faculty of Law at St Petersburg University in 1861. In the same year he was excluded from the university for taking part in student protests. After leaving St. Petersburg he went to study in Western Europe in 1864 and became the first Georgian to receive a doctorate (in law) from a European university, namely in Zurich (1868). Like many other Georgian intellectuals of that time, he followed the evolution of Russian liberals to different versions of socialism, establishing his own contacts with the Western leftist thinkers. Nikoladze was the first Georgian figure within this trend to gain position of influence in all-Russian liberalist movements. During his stay in Zurich, through Paul Lafargue he met Karl Marx, who asked Nikoladze to become the representative of the International in Transcaucasia. Nikoladze declined the offer because at that time his views were closer with the Russian revolutionary democrats, Nikolai Chernyshevsky and Nikolay Dobrolyubov, whom he had met in St. Petersburg. While in Europe, he briefly collaborated with Aleksandr Herzen in his influential newspaper, Kolokol (The Bell), in 1865, but Nikoladze soon broke with Herzen when the latter sent a reconciliatory open letter to the tsar.

Back in his native Georgia, he became involved in national-liberation movement inspired by Georgia's most famous intellectual of that time Prince Ilia Chavchavadze though Nikoladze's relations with Chavchavadze were not always easy. Nikoladze joined a more radical wing of this movement later named the Second Group (meore dasi) and quickly became one of its most influential leaders. This group sought widely for a program, ranging from state-regulated capitalism to various forms of "association" and collectivism, and worked to introduce European learning and culture in Georgia. They became the first Georgian political team to stress the importance of the urban and economic life of Georgia. They actively implemented their ideas into practice and worked to keep the Georgians from being pushed aside by the Russians and Armenians who dominated the Georgian cities, particularly the capital, Tiflis. He gained almost a scandalous name by publishing his sarcastic article, "A Thought on Likhi Mountain" (1871), where he compared Tiflis to an old whore, the wide, paved avenues, parks, and theaters being just her make-up, while the markets are her blackened teeth and the cemeteries and war-devastated fields her raddled body. Nikoladze's rhetoric attacks on the representatives of the older generation, who mostly chose to serve loyally to the Russian administration, further strengthened positions of the "men of the 60s," a backbone of younger Georgian intellectuals forming an opposition to the Tsarist regime.

From 1871 to 1875, Nikoladze lived between Paris and Tbilisi, organizing several revolutionary periodicals such as Krebuli in Tbilisi (1871), Drosha in Paris (1873) and Mimokhilva in Tbilisi. While he was in Paris, he married a Polish woman, Bogumila Zemaianskaia (also Bogumiła Ziemiańska), who had lived for a while in his hometown of Kutaisi. They had three children — a son who died young, and two daughters, Nino (born 1872) and Elizabeth, known as "Lolo". He returned to Tbilisi in 1875, but was arrested for his radical publications and expelled to Stavropol in 1880. Separated from Zemaianskaia, he was accompanied to Russia by Olga Guramishvili, member of an old noble Guramishvili family, whom he would marry after he was officially divorced in 1883.

Despite the strong governmental censure and pressure exerted upon Nikoladze, he remained an influential and respected writer not only in Georgia, but also in Russia proper. Many of his best writings composed in Russian and French were systematically published in the European press. The climax of Nikoladze's activity was his successful negotiations in the mid-1880s with Alexander III and his government that reduced the nationwide repressions and saved Vera Figner from the gallows and Chernyshevsky from exile.

In 1884, Nikoladze and Guramishvili were living in Saint Petersburg, where their daughter Rusudan (1884–1981) was born. From 1886, he led the liberal group Meore Dasi and though his family lived in Didi Jikhaishi, in the Imereti region of western Georgia, Nikoladze served as the editor of Novoe obozrenie in Tbilisi. He and Olga's other two children Giorgi (1888–1931) and Tamara (1892–1939), were born in Didi Jikhaishi. Also living as part of their family was his eldest daughter Nino.

As a notable public benefactor, Nikoladze was responsible for a number of social and economic projects, including the expansion of railway systems in Georgia and the construction of the Grozny-Poti pipeline. From 1894 to 1912, Nikoladze was elected a mayor of Poti. During his tenure as a mayor, he made this small portal town on Georgia's Black Sea coast an important maritime city and trading center.

Soon after the 1917 February Revolution in Russia, Nikoladze allied himself with more radical Georgian intelligentsia, supporting Georgia's full independence from Russia. He was elected an honorary chairman of the National Democratic Party of Georgia. During the years of the first Georgian republic (1918–1921), he was actively involved in the nation's social and economic life. In 1920 he led a delegation of the Chiatura Manganese Exporting Society in Europe. He was still abroad, when the short-lived Georgian independence was terminated by the Soviet Russia's military invasion in 1921. Yet Nikoladze decided to return to Soviet Georgia, retreating into a world of theory, preaching education and reform instead of violent revolution.

His daughters from his first marriage, Nino, married Levan Zurabishvili and Lolo married the Belgian writer and statesman, Camille Huysmans. From his second marriage Rusudan became a chemist and married Russian historian Mikhail Polievktov. Giorgi became a mathematician and Tamara married one of Giorgi's colleagues, Nikoloz Muskhelishvili.
