= Giorgi Nikoladze =

Georgian mathematician (1888–1931)

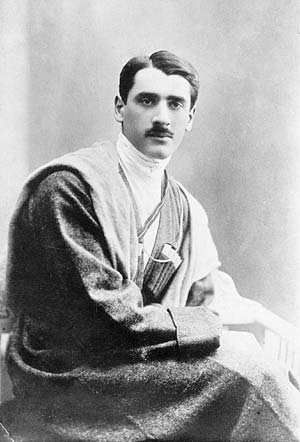
- Nikoladze in 1926
- Born: 11 August 1888; Didi Djikhaishi, Georgia, Russian Empire
- Died: 22 September 1931 (aged 43); Tbilisi, Georgian SSR, Soviet Union
- Education: University of Paris (PhD)
- Spouse: Georgetta Gambashidze
- Parents: Niko Nikoladze (father); Olga Guramishvili-Nikoladze (mother)
- Relatives: Nikoladze family Rusudana Nikoladze (sister)
- Scientific career
- Thesis: Sur les systèmes continus de figures géométriques (1928)

Giorgi Nikoladze (Note: Georgian: გიორგი ნიკოლაძე, romanized: Giorgi Nikoladze; Russian: Георгий Николаевич Николадзе, romanized: Georgy Nikolayevich Nikoladze; (Note: In this name that follows East Slavic naming customs, the patronymic is Nikolayevich and the family name is Nikoladze.) French: Georges Nicoladzé; also called "George Nikoladze" in some English-language sources) (11 August 1888 – 22 September 1931) was a Georgian mathematician, metallurgist, translator, gymnast, and alpinist. He worked as a professor at Tbilisi State University and as a translator for technical language into Georgian. He was also a cofounder of the Georgian Mathematical Union, founder of the first Georgian gymnastic society Shevardeni, and led a summit to Mount Kazbegi.

== Biography ==
The son of writer Niko Nikoladze and biologist Olga Guramishvili-Nikoladze, and a member of the Nikoladze noble family, Giorgi Nikoladze was born on 11 August 1888 at Didi Jikhaishi in Georgia, then part of the Russian Empire. He first studied at the First Tbilisi Classical Gymnasium from 1898 to 1906, then the Saint Petersburg State Institute of Technology until 1913, where he was granted a Diploma of Technological Engineer in Metallurgy. He then began working at the Tula Metallurgical Plant, later moving to the Donetsk Metallurgical Plant in the engineering department, and finally returning to Georgia in 1918.

From 1918 to 1928, he worked as a lecturer and then a professor at Tbilisi State University, and was awarded a doctorate from the faculty of sciences at the University of Paris in 1928 for his dissertation in geometry. Nikoladze was also an avid gymnast who was an adherent of the Sokol movement, founding the first Georgian gymnastic society Shevardeni in 1918. In 1920, he jointly published a "Russian-Georgian and Georgian-Russian dictionary of mathematical terms" with Archil Kharadze and Nikoloz Muskhelishvili. With this and other translation projects, Nikoladze sought to establish a uniform technical language in Georgian.

Alongside Kharadze, Muskhelishvli, and Andrea Razmadze, he founded the Georgian Mathematical Union in 1923. Nikoladze also had a long-time interest in alpinism since his childhood, and in August that same year, he successfully led an expedition to the summit of the 5000-meter high Mount Kazbegi. He was married to Georgetta Gambashidze. He died on 22 September 1931 in Tbilisi.

== Legacy ==
Although Nikoladze was little-known outside the Soviet Union, he was described as "one of the founders of the mathematics section at Tiflis [Tbilisi], and a pioneer in the technical and scientific development of the Caucasus." A monumental bust dedicated to him stands in the Giorgi Nikoladze Memorial Square in Zestaponi.

In 2016, Georgian historian Paata Natsvlishvili hypothesized that Nikoladze was actually the "unknown French boy" who won gold at the 1900 Summer Olympics in Paris. According to Natsvlishvili, Nikoladze's sister had told him in an interview in the 1980s that her brother had won a boat race in France, and that the family had been touring Europe at the time of the Olympics. However, some historians from the International Society of Olympic Historians remained unconvinced that Nikoladze was really the unknown boy owing to the circumstantial evidence. Historian Bill Mallon said that the unknown boy only looked "a little" like Nikoladze.
