= Mtatsminda Pantheon =

Cemetery in Tbilisi, Georgia

- მთაწმინდის მწერალთა და საზოგადო მოღვაწეთა პანთეონი
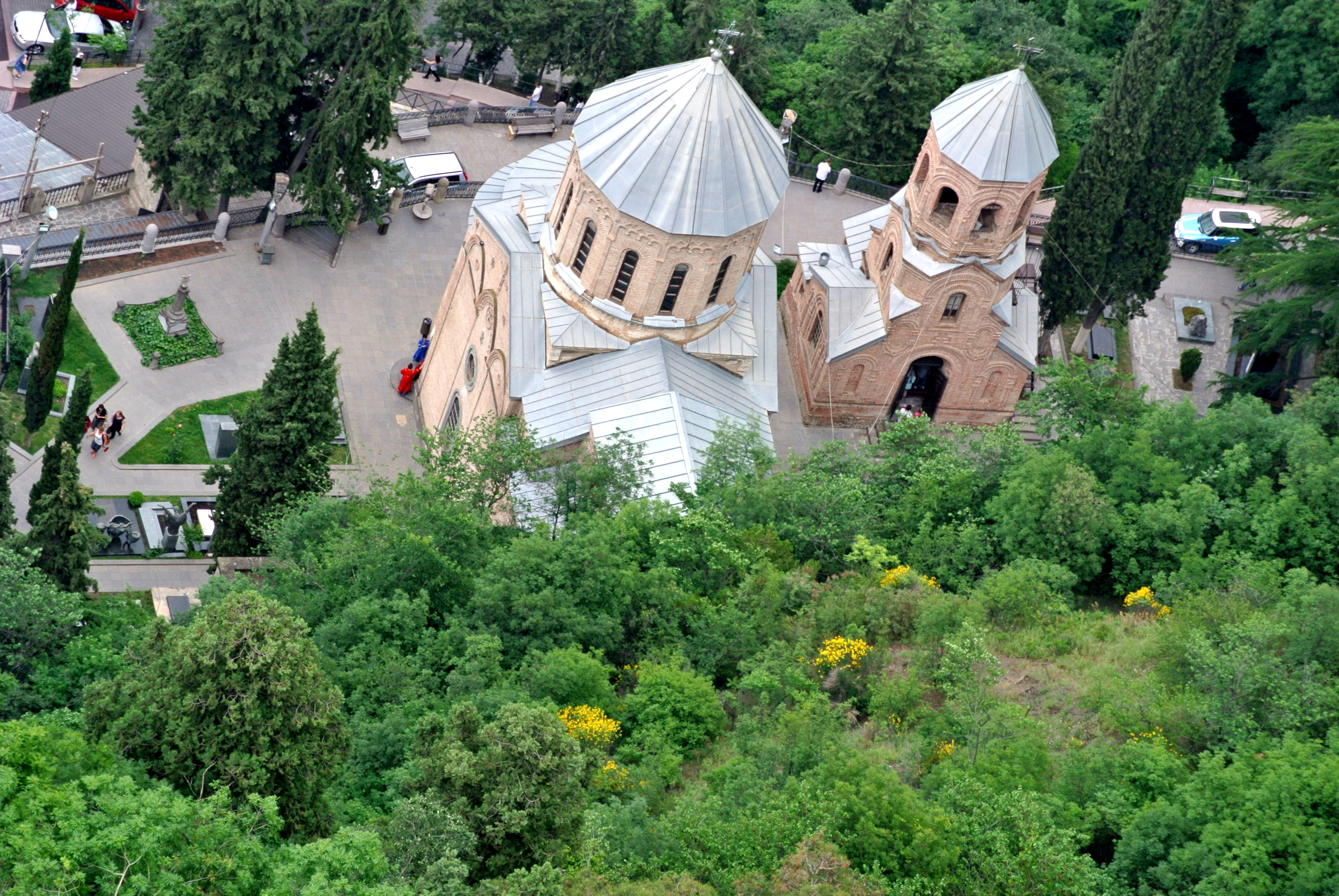
- Interactive map of Mtatsminda Pantheon

Details
- Location: Tbilisi
- Country: Georgia
- Coordinates: 41°41′45″N 44°47′20″E

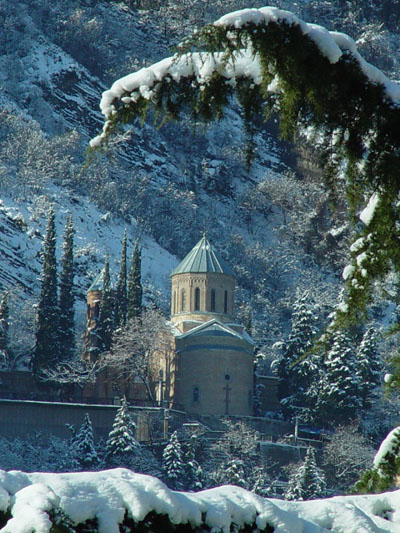
St. David's Church and Mtatsminda Pantheon.

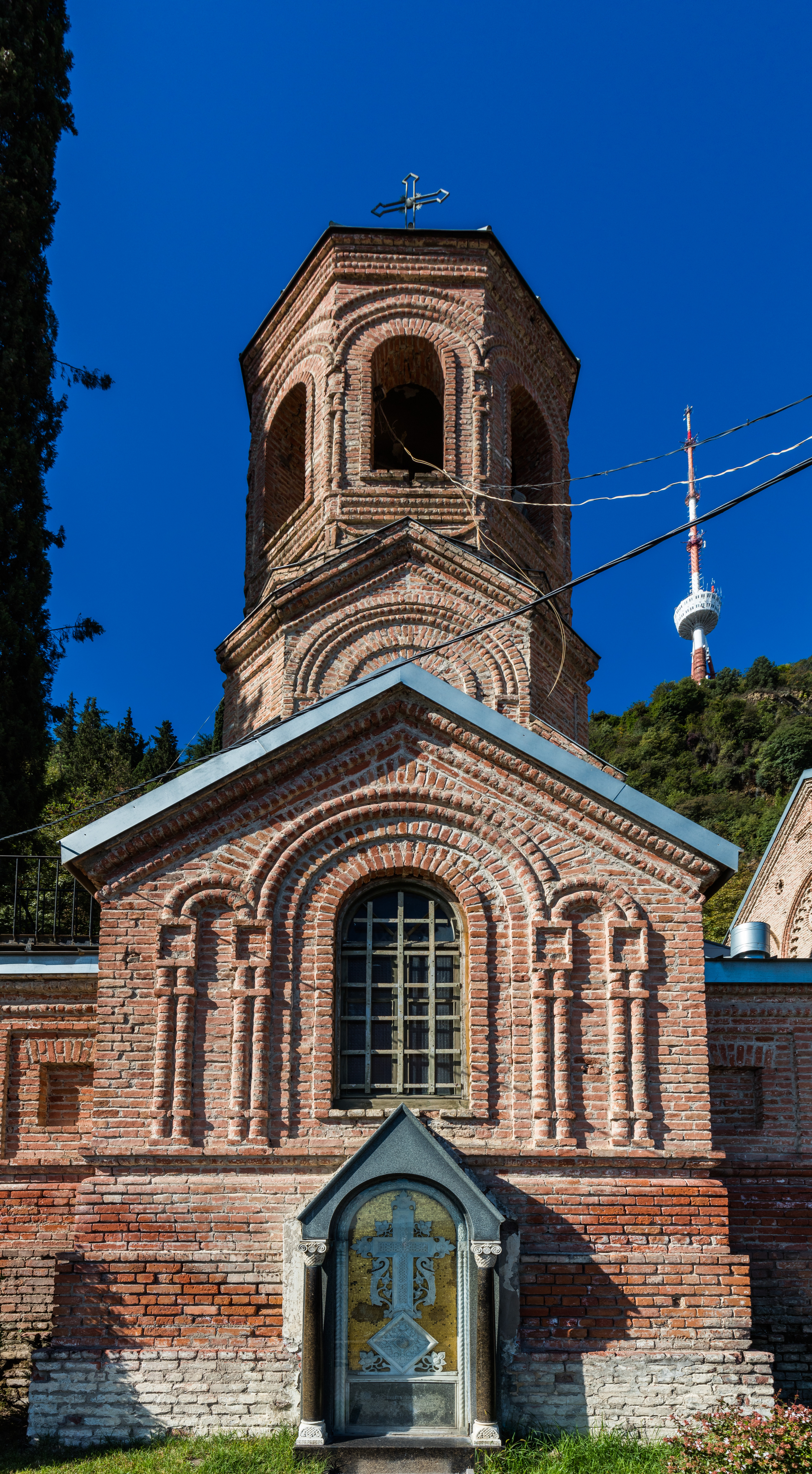
St David's.

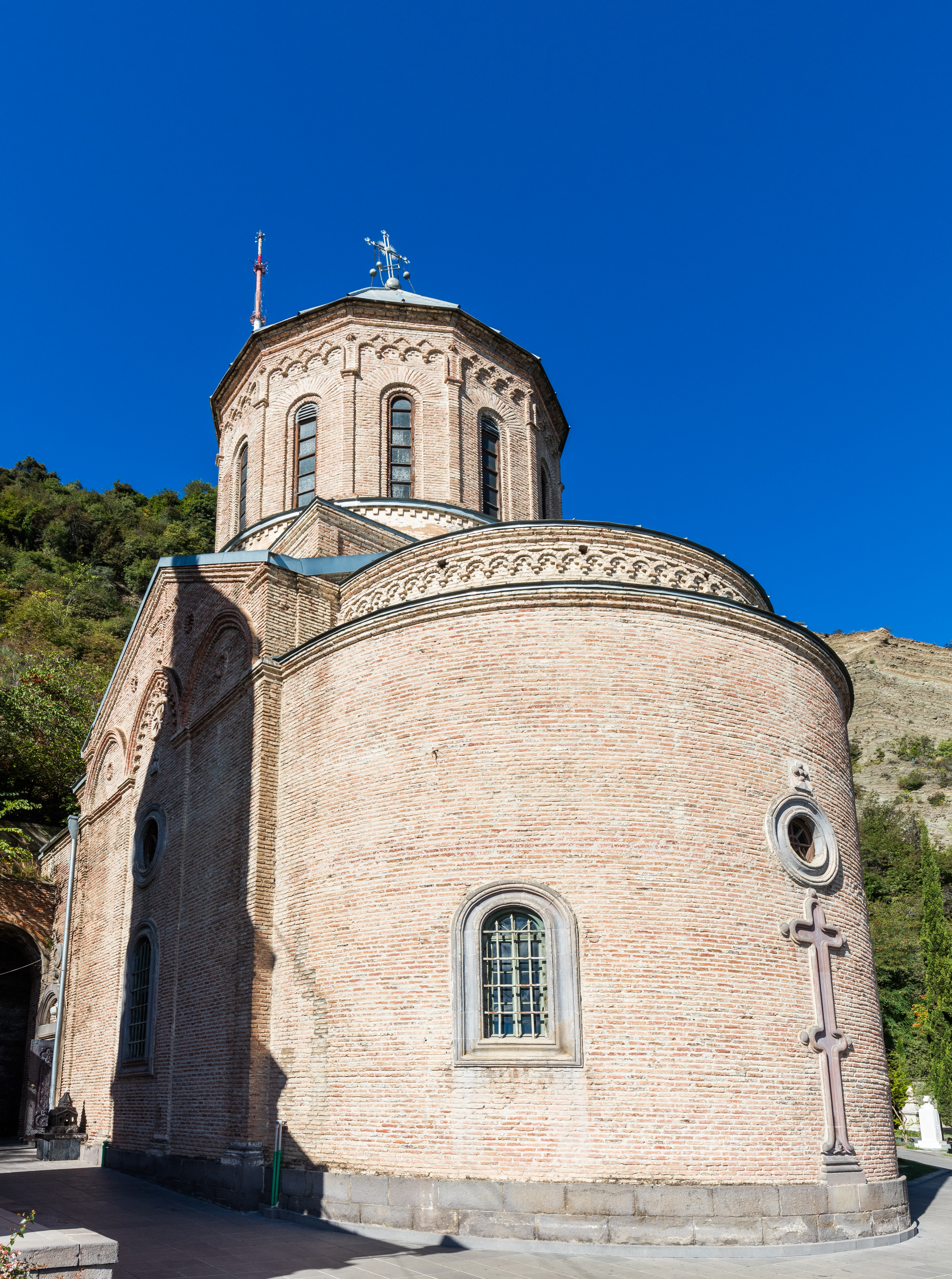
Pantheon.

The Mtatsminda Pantheon of Writers and Public Figures (Georgian: მთაწმინდის მწერალთა და საზოგადო მოღვაწეთა პანთეონი, mtats'mindis mts'eralta da sazogado moghvats'eta p'anteoni) is a necropolis in Tbilisi, Georgia, where some of the most prominent writers, artists, scholars, and national heroes of Georgia are buried. It is located in the churchyard around St David's Church "Mamadaviti" on the slope of Mount Mtatsminda (Geo. მთაწმინდა, meaning the Holy Mountain) and was officially established in 1929. Atop the mountain is Mtatsminda Park, an amusement park owned by the municipality of Tbilisi.

The first celebrities to be buried at this place were the Russian writer Alexander Griboyedov (1795–1829) and his Georgian wife Nino Chavchavadze (1812–1857). The Pantheon was officially opened in 1929 to mark the centenary of Griboyedov's death during his time as the Russian ambassador. The Pantheon was conceived of as a symbol of collective identity of Georgia. Since then, several illustrious Georgians have been buried or reburied there. The Pantheon is administered by the Government of Tbilisi and is frequented by locals as well as the city's visitors.

== History ==
The Pantheon has a history that reflects some of Georgia's political turns.

=== Origins and Soviet Period ===
The earliest attempt to create a Pantheon in Tbilisi was the Pantheon of Kukia, which the Dramaturgical Society of Georgia began work on to honor its artists by 1900, but which had disappeared by the 1950s. Later, the Society for Spreading Literacy Among Georgians managed to established the Didube Pantheon in 1915. In 1929, the Government of the Soviet Union, which controlled Georgia at the time, established another pantheon on a former cemetery near the Mtatsminda Church; its opening was dedicated to the 100-year anniversary of Alexander Griboyedov, who was buried there in 1829 with his wife (and whose grave had a sculpture of a mourning woman on it).

Under Soviet rule, the Didube Pantheon was nearly abolished in the 1930s. There was an order issued in 1934 to remove unknown or unimportant tombs from Mtatsminda and to transfer some distinguished people, including Nikoloz Baratashvili and Vazha-Pshavela from Didube to Mtatsminda; this order marked the fall of Didube's status and the rise of Mtatsminda's. In 1937, the pantheon's administration adopted regulations indicating that the decision-making council should consist mainly of government official, party members, and Georgian scholars. Because of the totalitarian system, it was easy to create the impression that the Mtatsminda Pantheon was the most desirable place of rest for Georgians, an impression which still persisted in 2014.

Because of the presence of Bolshevik activists, Konstantine Gamsakhurdia apparently refused to be buried in the Pantheon. In 1987, explosives were placed on the grave of a Bolshevik widely believed to be involved in the assassination of Ilia Chavchavadze, who is also buried in the Pantheon. Illustrating the contested character of the Mtatsminda Pantheon, Gamsakhurdia had earlier written that "Judas and Christ are mentioned together in every epoch, but nowhere before has it happened that Judas was buried next to Christ. This could only happen in our Georgian Mtatsminda cemetery."

=== Pantheon After Georgia's Independence in 1991 ===
During the Saakashvili period (2004-2012), several changes were made, including the transfer of Zviad Gamsakhurdia's remains from the North Caucasus to the Mtatsminda Pantheon, as well as erecting a gravestone to some of the writers who were killed during the 1937 purges.

In 2009, Tbilisi City Hall announced that the old Mtatsminda Pantheon had no more space and that there were ongoing consultations about a new one with the Patriarch of Georgia. In October 2009, the vice-mayor of Tbilisi declared, "a new place has to be selected, where a church can be erected and public funerals can be held. It is important to build the new pantheon at an especially good location, accessible for society and approved by society". However, since the official closure of the old site, there have been exceptions: Mukhran Machavariani was buried there in 2010 and Chabua Amirejibi was buried there in 2013 (the latter of which caused controversy).

In 2021, the remains of Giorgi Kvinitadze, a commanding general of Georgia's First Republic, were reinterred on the Mtatsminda Pantheon, after being returned from France.

As of 2014, there are three Pantheons in Tbilisi under city hall supervision, which are Mtatsminda Pantheon, Didube Pantheon, and Khojivank Pantheon (the last of which is Armenian).

== List of burials ==
- Vaso Abashidze (1854–1926), Georgian theater actor and director (1926)
- Veriko Anjaparidze (1897–1987), Georgian theater and movie actress (1987)
- Nikoloz Baratashvili (1817–1845), Georgian romanticist poet (1938, reburied from Didube Pantheon)
- Vasil Barnovi (1856–1934), Georgian novelist (1934)
- Nikoloz Berdzenishvili (1894–1965), Georgian historian (1965)
- Vakhtang Chabukiani (1910–1992), Georgian ballet dancer (1992)
- Ilia Chavchavadze (Saint Ilia the Righteous) (1837–1907), Georgian writer and public figure (1907); and his wife Olgha Guramishvili (1842–1927) (1927)
- Zakaria Chichinadze (1853–1931), Georgian amateur historian and publisher (1931)
- Simon Chikovani (1902–1966), Georgian poet and public figure (1966)
- Otar Chiladze (1933–2009), Georgian writer (2009)
- Kakutsa Cholokashvili (1888–1930), Georgian national hero and fighter against the Soviet regime (2005, reburied from France)
- Shalva Dadiani (1874–1959), Georgian playwright and actor (1959)
- Nodar Dumbadze (1928–1984), Georgian writer (2009, reburied from Mziuri Park
- Davit Eristavi (1847–1890), Georgian journalist, translator and playwright (1930, reburied from Kaloubani Church)
- Zviad Gamsakhurdia (1939–1993), Soviet-era dissident and the first democratically elected President of Georgia (2007, reburied from Grozny)
- Keke Geladze (1858–1937), mother of Joseph Stalin (1937)
- Iakob Gogebashvili (1840–1912), Georgian writer and educator (1940, reburied from Didube Pantheon
- Alexander Griboyedov (1795–1829), Russian writer (1829); and his wife Nino Chavchavadze (1812–1857) (1857)
- Ioseb Grishashvili (1889–1965), Georgian writer, poet and scholar (1965)
- Lado Gudiashvili (1896–1980), Georgian painter (1980)
- Olga Guramishvili-Nikoladze (1855–1940), Georgian educator (1940)
- Simon Janashia (1900–1947), Georgian historian (1947)
- Mose Janashvili (1855–1934), Georgian historian (1934)
- Ana Kalandadze (1924–2008), Georgian poet (2008)
- Akaki Khorava (1895–1972), Georgian actor (1972)
- Leo Kiacheli (1884–1963), Georgian writer (1963)
- Dimitri Kipiani (1814–1887), Georgian journalist and public figure (1887)
- Davit Kldiashvili (1862–1931), Georgian writer (1931)
- Merab Kostava (1939–1989), Soviet-era dissident and national hero of Georgia (1989)
- Giorgi Leonidze (1899–1966), Georgian poet (1966)
- Kote Marjanishvili (1872–1933), Georgian theatre director (1964, reburied from Pantheon of Georgian National Opera Theater)
- Nikoloz Muskhelishvili (1891–1976), Georgian mathematician (1976)
- Niko Nikoladze (1843–1928), Georgian journalist and public benefactor (1928)
- Iakob Nikoladze (1876–1951), Georgian sculptor (1951)
- Ivane Paliashvili (1868–1934), Georgian conductor (1934)
- Galaktion Tabidze (1891–1959), Georgian poet (1959)
- Ekvtime Takaishvili (1862–1953), Georgian historian and archaeologist
- Aleksandre Tsagareli (1844–1929), Georgian linguist (1929)
- Akaki Tsereteli (1840–1915), Georgian poet (1915)
- Grigol Tsereteli (1870–1938), Georgian papyrologist (1938)
- Mikhail Tskhakaya (1865–1950), Georgian communist (1950, reburied to Khudadov Forest Cemetery in 1989)
- Anastasia Tumanishvili-Tsereteli (1849–1932), Georgian woman writer (1932)
- Vazha-Pshavela (1861–1915), Georgian poet (1935, reburied from Didube Pantheon)
- Ilia Vekua (1907–1977), Georgian mathematician (1977)
- Sergo Zakariadze (1909–1971), Georgian actor (1971)
- Solomon Dodashvili (1805–1836), Georgian philosopher, journalist, historian, grammarian, belletrist and enlightener (1994, reburied from Kirov)
- Chabua Amirejibi (1921–2013), Georgian novelist and Soviet-era dissident (2013)
- Niko Pirosmani (1862–1918), Georgian artist
- Jansug Charkviani (1931–2017), Georgian poet (2017)
- Giorgi Kvinitadze (1874–1970), Georgian general (2021, reburied from France)

== See also ==
- Didube Pantheon
- Saburtalo Pantheon
- List of cemeteries in Georgia (country)
