= Gldani District =

Gldani District გლდანის რაიონი
- Tbilisi District
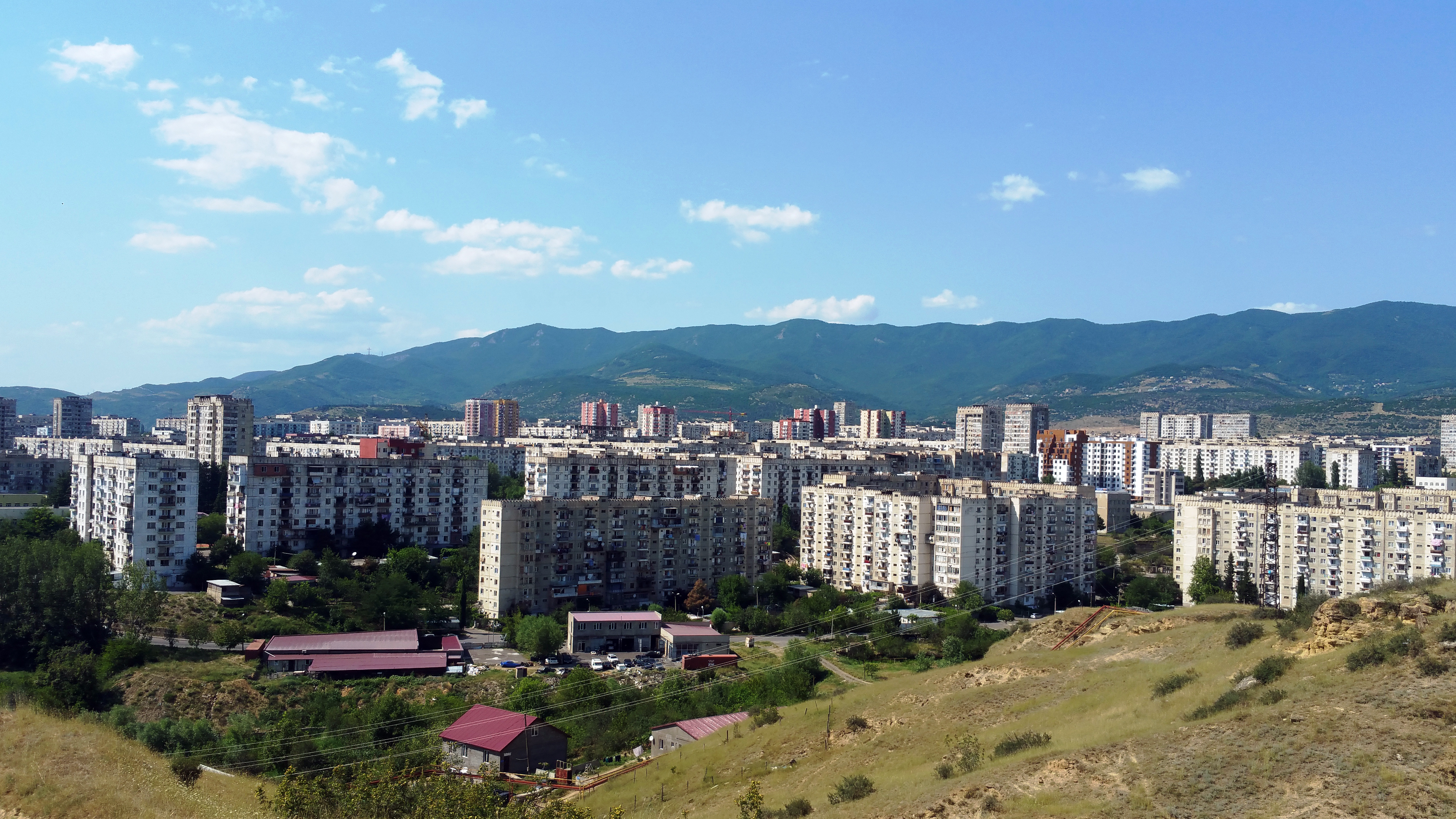
- Gldani I Microdistrict
- Interactive map of Gldani District
- Location within Tbilisi
- Country: Georgia
- City: Tbilisi
- Administracion HQ: 1g, Sarajishvili Str, Tbilisi

Government
  - Body: Administration of district
  - Head of district: Levan Naroushvili

Population (2017)
  - Total: 177,500
- Time zone: UTC+4 (Georgian Time)
- Website: www.tbilisi.gov.ge

Gldani is an administrative district (raioni) in Tbilisi, capital of Georgia.

Gldani District includes the neighborhoods: Gldani Massive, Avchala, Mukhiani, Gldanula, Koniaki Settlement, Zahesi.
