= Georgian Mathematical Union =

Mathematical society in Georgia

- საქართველოს მათემატიკოსთა კავშირი
- Abbreviation: GMU, სმკ
- Predecessor: Georgian Mathematical Society
- Formation: 21 February 1923; 103 years ago
- Type: Mathematical society
- Headquarters: Andrea Razmadze Mathematical Institute
- Location: Georgia
- President: Alexander Meskhi
- Website: gmu.gtu.ge

The Georgian Mathematical Union or GMU (Georgian: საქართველოს მათემატიკოსთა კავშირი, სმკ) is a mathematical society founded in Georgia in 1923. The GMU has its headquarters at the Andrea Razmadze Mathematical Institute in Tbilisi. It is a founding member of the European Mathematical Society and is recognised by the International Mathematical Union.

The Georgian Mathematical Union describes its mission as "to promote mathematical sciences, especially among the young generation, and to establish and strengthen contacts with colleagues from abroad and with international professional organisations." Since 2010 the GMU has held an annual conference in Batumi; the 13th conference was held as a hybrid event in September 2023.

== History ==
The predecessor of the Georgian Mathematical Union was the Georgian Mathematical Society, which was founded on 21 February 1923. Among the founders were Georgian mathematicians Nikolz Muskhelishvili, Giorgi Nikoladze, Archil Kharadze, and Andrei Razmadze, who served as the society's first president. At the 1924 International Congress of Mathematicians in Toronto the society became a member of the International Mathematical Union.

Razmadze died in 1929, and the society went dormant until being reformed in 1962 by Viktor Kupradze, Boris Khvedelidze, Levan Gokieli and Archil Kharadze. The reformed society still dates its formation to 1923.

The Georgian Mathematical Society was a founding member of the European Mathematical Society in 1990, and once more joined the IMU in 1991. In 1994 its name was changed to the Georgian Mathematical Union.

== Logo ==
The logo of the Georgian Mathematical Union contains the outline of Georgia, with its national flag superimposed, and surrounded by four equations.

- $\Delta u + k^2u=0$ is the Helmholtz equation.

== Presidents ==
The past presidents of the Georgian Mathematical Union are:

- Andrei Razmadze (1923–1929)
- Viktor Kupradze (1962–1966)
- Levan Gokieli (1966–1970)
- Archil Kharadze (1970–1974)
- Levan Magnaradze (1974–1994)
- David Natroshvili (1994–1997)
- Roland Duduchava (1997–2001)
- Teimuraz Vepkhvadze (2001–2005)
- Jondo Sharikadze (2005–2009)
- Roland Duduchava (2009–2017)
- David Natroshvili (2017–2022)
- Alexander Meskhi (2022–present)

== See also ==
- List of mathematical societies
