= Gury Kolosov =

Soviet engineer and mathematician

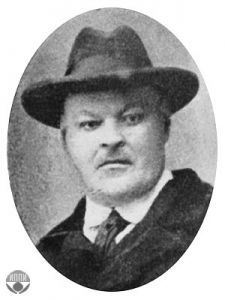

Gury Vasilievich Kolosov (Гурий Васильевич Колосов, 25 August 1867 – 7 November 1936) was a Russian and Soviet mathematician and engineer. He is best known for his contributions to the theory of elasticity. In 1907 Kolosov derived the solution for stresses around an elliptical hole in a solid material governed by the mathematical theory of elasticity. He showed that the concentration of stress could become far greater, as the radius of curvature at an end of the hole becomes small compared with the overall length of the hole.

Brittle fracture in the form of crack growth is governed by the stress field around the crack tip and by parameters that describe the resistance of the material to crack growth. Thus, the analysis of stress near the crack tip constitutes an essential part of fracture mechanics. ... Among various mathematical methods in plane elasticity, the complex potential function method by Kolosov and Muskhelishvili is one of the most powerful and convenient methods to treat two-dimensional crack problems. In the complex potential method, stresses and displacements are expressed in terms of analytic functions of complex variables. The problem of obtaining stresses and displacements around a crack tip is converted to finding some analytic functions subjected to appropriate boundary conditions.

Kolosov was born in Ust, Novgorod guberniya. He then studied at University of St Petersburg where he continued to after graduation. Eventually, he defended his thesis there under the supervision of V.A. Steklov. He worked at University of Tartu (from 1902 to 1913), but later returned to St Petersburg where he worked at both the University of St Petersburg and the Electrotechnical Institute. He was an invited speaker at the International Congress of Mathematicians in 1908 at Rome and in 1928 at Bologna.

Kolosov was elected a corresponding member of the Russian Academy of Sciences in 1931. He wrote the 1935 monograph "The use of a complex variable in the theory of elasticity" (in Russian).

He was buried in Smolensky Cemetery.
