= Iveria (newspaper) =

Georgian newspaper, periodical

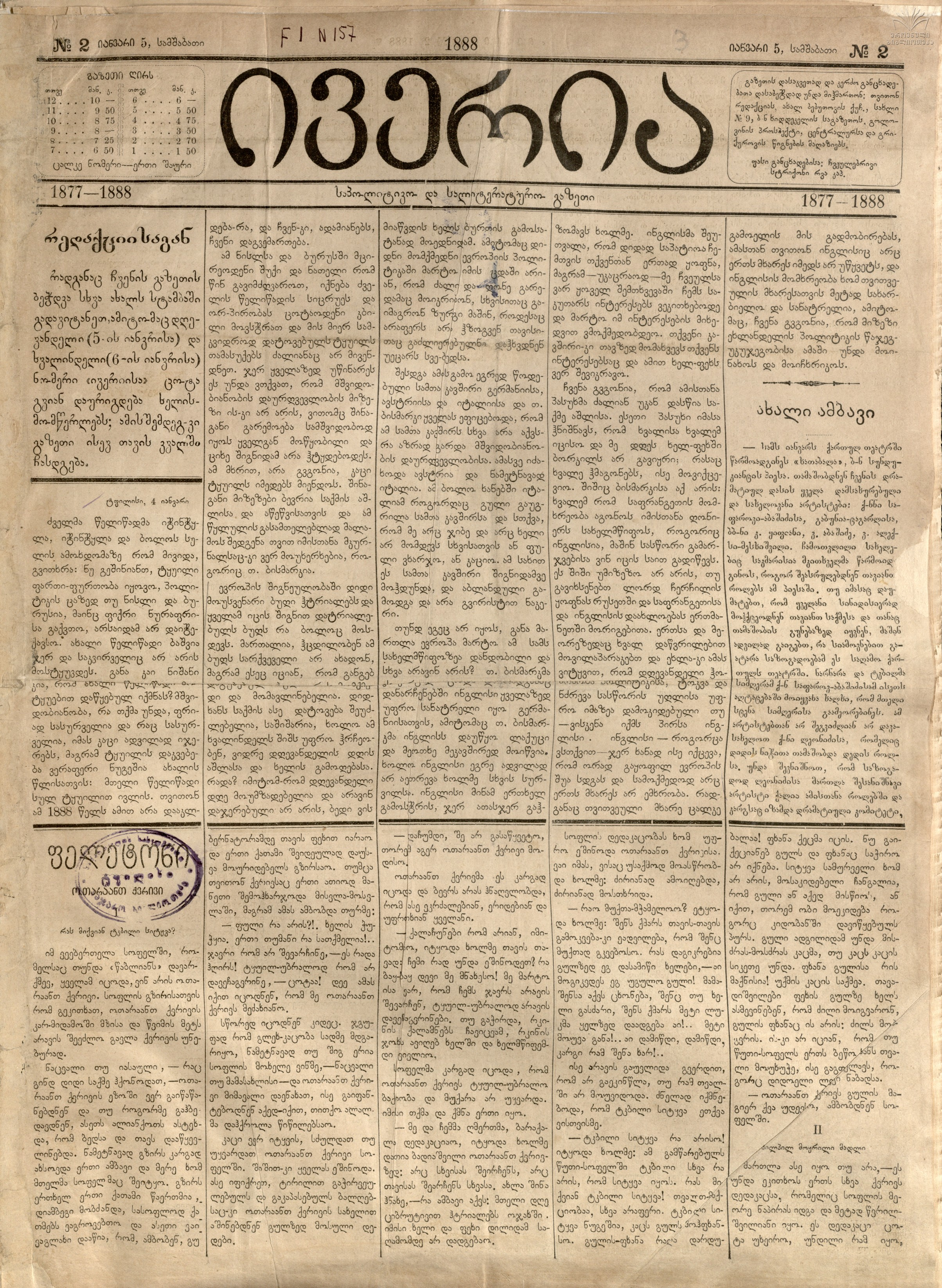
Newspaper Iveria cover

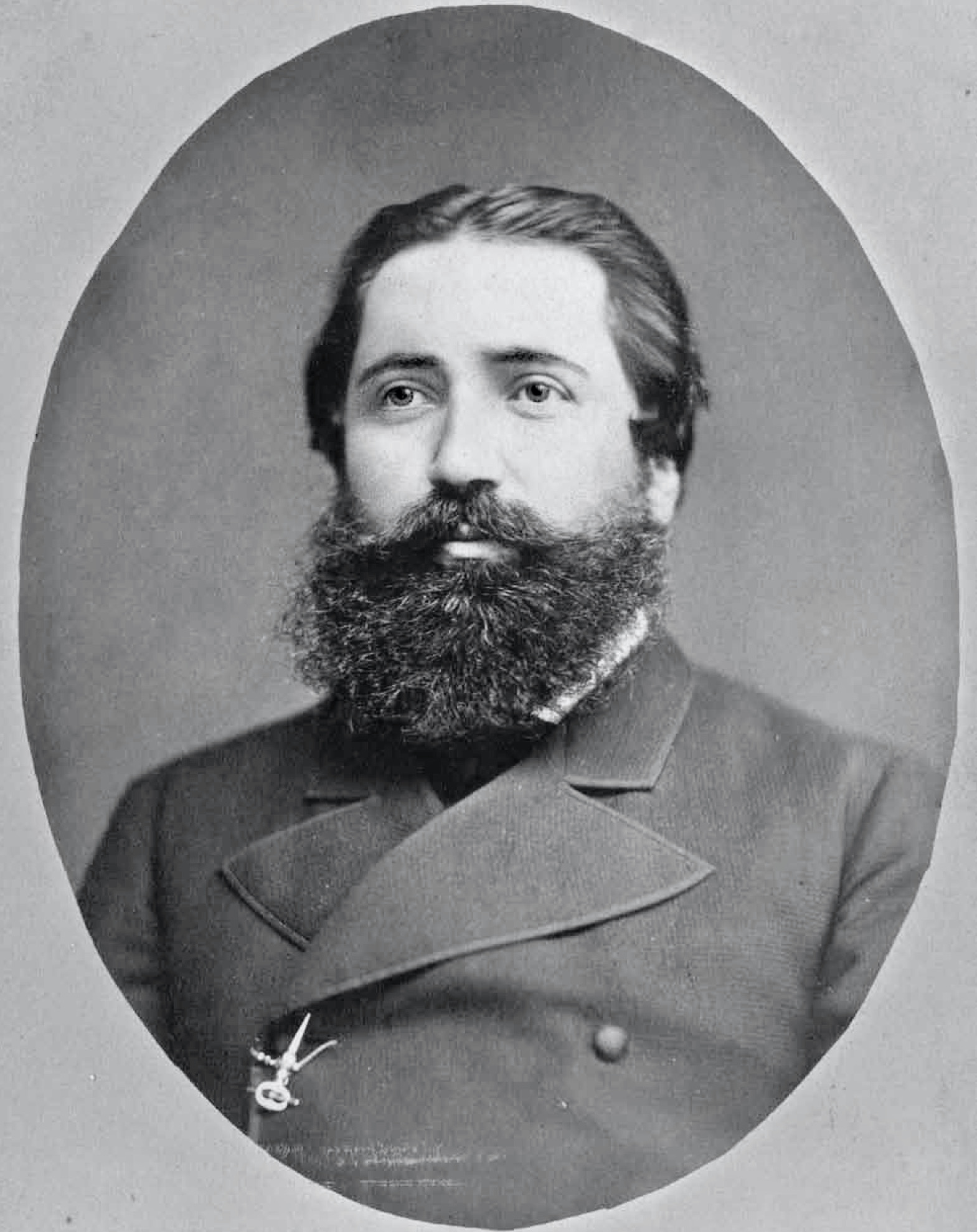
Ilia Chavchavadze, founder of Iveria

Iveria (Georgian: ივერია) was a Georgian political and literary periodical that was published in Tbilisi as a weekly newspaper from March 3, 1877, in 1879–1885 as a magazine, and from 1886 as a daily newspaper. Founder and editor was the writer and poet Prince Ilia Chavchavadze. The newspaper was closed with last issue on 27 August 1906.

The name of the newspaper is derived from Iberia, based on the historic name of Georgia as Caucasian Iberia. The newspaper focused on the national liberation movement of Georgia in the late 1800s.

Iveria was an anti-government organ, and wanted to strengthen the national self-consciousness of Georgians against russification and to serve the idea of political independence. Iveria was thematically diverse, covering the issues of labour movement in Georgia and abroad, history, linguistics, ethnography, geography, sociology and more. Much attention was paid to public education issues, the school, teachers, government policies in the field of education, and the education system. Iveria played a special role in the development of Georgian literature and published for many acclaimed authors. The newspaper provided rich information to the readers on contemporary foreign literature, collected and published samples of Georgian folk art etc.

In 1881, another influential publication Droeba was merged into Iveria as one publication.

== Editors-in-chief ==
- Ilia Chavchavadze (1877-1902)
- Sergei Meskhi (1881, after merging with the newspaper Droeba)
- Ivane Machabeli (1882–1884)
- Alexander Sarajishvili (1902-1903)
- Grigol Kipshidze (1903–1905)
- Philip Gogichaishvili (1906)

== Relaunch ==
On February 20, 1989, the newspaper Iveria was restored by Zurab Chavchavadze and was periodically published as a newspaper of the Ilia Chavchavadze Society until 1997.

== Sources ==
- Khutsishvili S., Georgian Soviet Encyclopedia, Vol. 5, Tbilisi, 1980. p. 94.
