= Andria Apakidze =

Georgian archaeologist (1914–2005)

- ანდრია აფაქიძე
- Born: September 3, 1914; Zana, Senaki, Kutaisi, Caucasus Viceroyalty, Russian Empire
- Died: November 25, 2005 (aged 91); Georgia
- Education: Doctor of Historical Sciences (1959)
- Awards: Honoured Scientist of the Georgian SSR; Order of the Badge of Honour; Simon Janashia Prize; Award of the Georgian State; Order of the Red Banner of Labour; Order of Honor (Georgia)

Andria Meliton dze Afakidze (Georgian: ანდრია მელიტონის ძე აფაქიძე; September 3, 1914 – November 25, 2005), Doctor of History and professor, was a Georgian archaeologist and historian specializing in the studies of ancient Georgia, and the author of widely known works on archaeology.

He led the large-scale excavations of Armazi, Tsitsamuri, and Sarkine (1936), Pitsunda (1952-1974) and Mtskheta (since 1975). He directed the Janashia Museum of Georgia from 1943 until 1952 when he became the head of the archaeology section of the Georgian Academy of Sciences Institute of History. Since April 1, 1994, he presided over the Mtskheta Archaeology Institute.
