= Vasil Barnovi =

Georgian writer

- Born: 22 May 1856 Koda, Tiflis Governorate, Russian Empire
- Died: 4 November 1934 (aged 78) Tbilisi, Georgian SSR, Soviet Union
- Occupation: Writer
- Language: Georgian
- Genre: Historical fiction

Vasil Barnovi (Georgian: ვასილ ბარნოვი) (real surname: Barnaveli, ბარნაველი) (May 22, 1856 – November 4, 1934) was a Georgian writer popular for his historical novels.

He was born into the family of a priest in the village of Koda in what is now Lower Kartli region, Georgia (then under Imperial Russia). He was educated at the seminaries of Tbilisi and Moscow. Returning to Georgia in 1882, he taught Georgian language and literature in Senaki, Telavi, and Tbilisi. At the same time, he engaged in journalism, studied Georgian folklore, and authored autobiographical stories. He is best known, however, for his contributions to the development of modern Georgian historical prose. His novels – მიმქრალი შარავანდედი (The Faded Halo; 1913), ტრფობა წამებული (The Martyred Love; 1918), ისნის ცისკარი (The Dawn of Isani; 1928) and others – are really psychological novels in a historical setting, intertwining historical themes with folklore and fiction, and political in the measure in which they protest against the Russian rule. Barnovi’s works are characterized by the abstraction of historical episodes and idealization of medieval Georgian heroes.

He died in Tbilisi and was interred at the Mtatsminda Pantheon at Tbilisi.
