= Andrea Razmadze =

Georgian mathematician (1889–1929)

Andrea Mikhailovich Razmadze Sc.D.
- ანდრია რაზმაძე
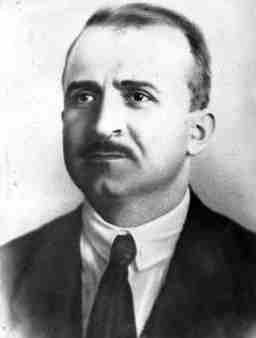
- Andrea Razmadze
- Born: 12 August 1889; Chkhenishi, Tiflis Governorate, Russian Empire (now Samtredia)
- Died: 2 October 1929 (aged 40); Tiflis, Georgian SSR, Transcaucasian SFSR, Soviet Union
- Education: Moscow University
- Known for: Calculus of Variations
- Scientific career
- Fields: Mathematics
- Institutions: Tbilisi University

Andrea Mikhailovich Razmadze (sometimes spelled Andria/Andrei Razmadze, 12 August 1889 – 2 October 1929) was a Georgian mathematician, and one of the founders of Tbilisi State University, whose Mathematics Institute was renamed in his honor in 1944. The department's scientific journal, published continuously since 1937, was also renamed as the Proceedings of A. Razmadze Mathematical Institute in his honor.

== Biography ==
Andrea Razmadze was the son of Mikhail Gavrilovich Razmadze, a railway worker, and Nino Georgievna Nodia. He graduated from Kutaisi nonclassical secondary school in 1906 (where Public School #41 has been renamed for him), then studied at Moscow University, earning a Diploma in 1910, and then a Masters in 1917 while teaching at local classical and secondary schools. At the invitation of the university, he briefly stayed in Moscow University to teach mathematics in 1917, but soon left to become one of the founders of Tbilisi University. Though he died just 11 years later, during his time there he greatly expanded Georgian mathematical terminology by publishing three textbooks in that language, and insisting that all courses be taught in Georgian, an approach that attracted renowned mathematician Nikoloz Muskhelishvili to the school. He also founded the Georgian Mathematical Union on 21 February 1923 and was its first president; this institution lapsed on his death, but was reorganized from 1962 to the present. He is most famous for his work in the calculus of variations, where he discovered an efficient method for finding the extrema of integral functions, and a comprehensive theory for finding the extrema of discontinuous ("angular") functions that can be represented by a finite number of curves. He presented this last result at the 1924 International Congress of Mathematicians in Toronto, for which he was awarded a Sc.D. by the Sorbonne. He also delivered lectures in Jacques Hadamard's famous seminar series in Paris, along with such notables as Paul Lévy, Laurent Schwartz, and Nobel laureates Louis de Broglie and Max Born.
