= Transactions of A. Razmadze Mathematical Institute =

- Discipline: Mathematics
- Language: English, German, French, Russian
- Edited by: A. Meskhi

Publication details
- Former name: Proceedings of A. Razmadze Mathematical Institute
- History: 1937–present
- Publisher: A. Razmadze Mathematical Institute (Georgia)
- Frequency: Triannual
- Impact factor: 0.4 (2014)

Standard abbreviations
- ISO 4: Trans. A. Razmadze Math. Inst.

Indexing
- ISSN: 2346-8092

Links
- Journal homepage

The Transactions of A. Razmadze Mathematical Institute is a peer-reviewed scientific journal published by the A. Razmadze Mathematical Institute.

The journal was originally established as Travaux de l'Institut Mathématique de Tbilissi in 1937, renaming itself Trudy Tbilisskogo Matematicheskogo Instituta in 1948 and Proceedings of A. Razmadze Mathematical Institute in 1990–2015. It acquired its current name in 2016. It has published more than 170 volumes. The journal is named for Georgian mathematician Andrea Razmadze, one of the original four of the Mathematical Institute, and a co-founder of Tbilisi State University.

The journal has a wide scope publishing research papers in mathematics and Mathematical Physics—encouraging papers that bridge mathematics with other sciences and adhere to contemporary mathematical standards. The articles are indexed and reviewed in Zentralblatt für Mathematik and Mathematical Reviews.

Notable authors includes S. Bergman, P. Erdös, N. Günter, J. Hadamard, Ph. Hartman and A. Wintner, M. Keldysh, A. Kharadze, V. Kupradze, E. Landau, M. Lavrentjev, Loo-Keng Hua, N. Muskhelishvili, G. Nikoladze, A. Ostrowski, L. Tonelli, I. Vekua, I. Vinogradov, A. Walfisz and many more. 0.4 is the 2024 Impact Factor of the journal.

== Editor-in-Chief ==
The current editor in chief is A. Meskhi (A. Razmadze Mathematical Institute).
