= Nikoladze =

Nikoladze (Georgian: ჯაფარიძე) is a Georgian surname associated with a Georgian noble Nikoladze family. It is a patronymic surname derived from the given name Nikolai, 'Nicholas'. Notable people with the surname include:

- Niko Nikoladze (1843–1928), Georgian writer
- Giorgi Nikoladze (1888–1931), Georgian mathematician
- Iakob Nikoladze, Georgian sculptor and artist
