= Guramishvili =

Georgian noble family

Coat of arms of Princes Guramov

The House of Guramishvili (Georgian: გურამიშვილი; ) is a Georgian noble family derived from the House of Zedginidze and known since the 16th century in the eastern provinces of the country.

== History ==
The possible forefather of the Guramishvili family, Guram Zevdginidze, is recorded in the document dated from the period of 1401–1413. The surname “Guramishvili” appears later in the 16th century. The family was listed among the grandees in the Kingdom of Kakheti. Their possessions were centered on the villages Saguramo, Avchala, and Tsitsamuri. Throughout the 17th century, the family held a hereditary title of sup’raji, a court office responsible for serving the royal table. In the 18th century, the family entered a period of decline, holding lower titles such as bok’auli (bailiff) and amilakhvari (a provincial Master of the Horse). After the Russian annexation of Georgia, the family was confirmed in the princely rank (knyaz Guramov, Гурамовы) in 1826 and 1850.

The family was made famous by Prince David Guramishvili (1705–1792), an eminent poet known for his troubled life.
