= Tsitsamuri =

Tsitsamuri წიწამური
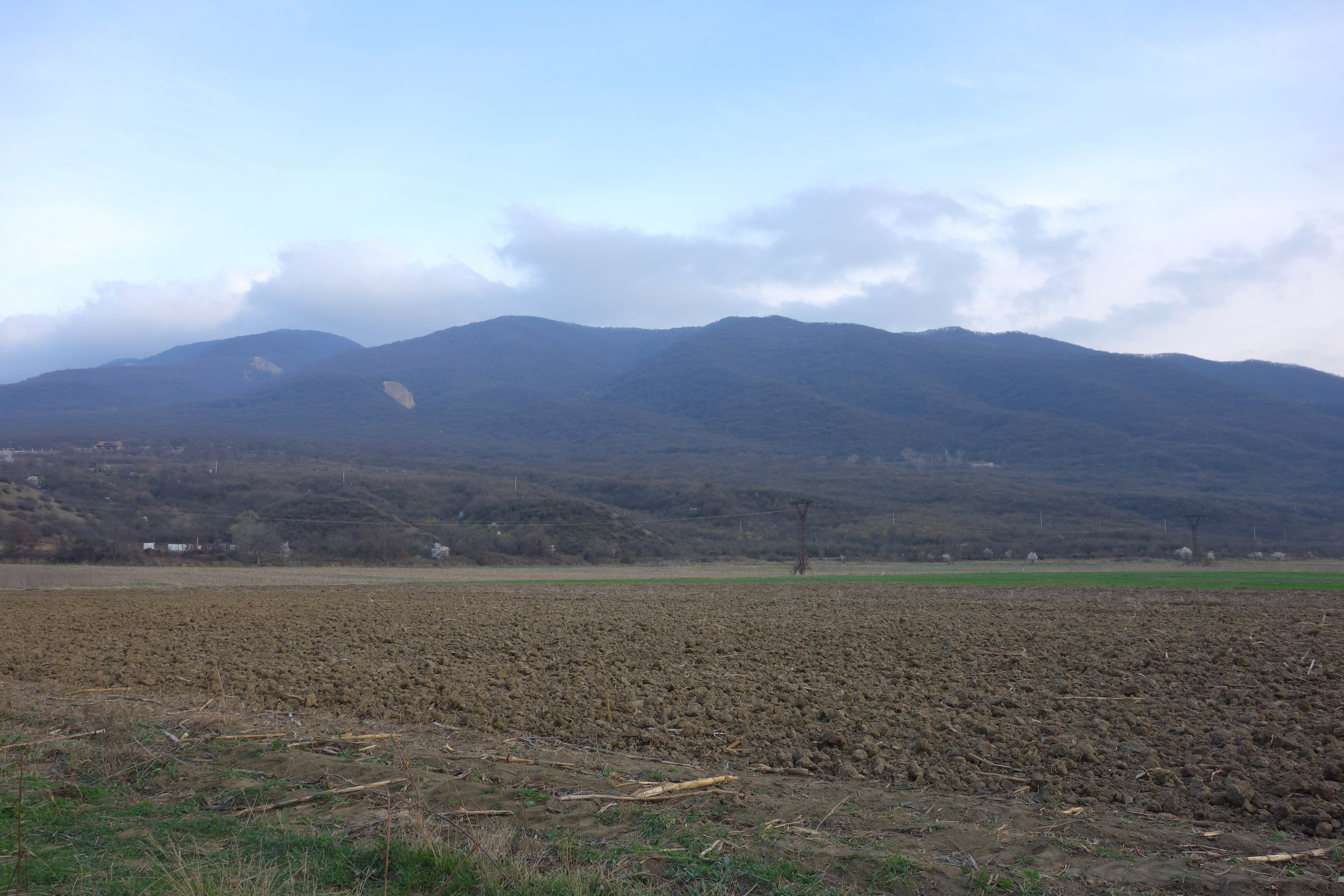
- Interactive map of Tsitsamuri
- Location in Georgia Tsitsamuri (Georgia)
- Coordinates: 41°51′39″N 44°43′57″E
- Country: Georgia
- Region: Mtskheta-Mtianeti
- Municipality: Mtskheta
- Elevation: 488 m (1,601 ft)

Population (2014)
  - Total: 124
- Time zone: UTC+4 (Georgian Time)

Tsitsamuri (Georgian: წიწამური) is a small village outside Mtskheta, Georgia. It is known as the place where the nation's famous writer and poet, Ilia Chavchavadze, was assassinated in 1907.

Near Tsitsamuri (identified as the Seusamora of Strabo) a ruined acropolis of ancient Iberia was unearthed by the archaeologist Andria Apakidze in 1953. It is to be identified with the Zaden-tsikhe (ზადენციხე), i.e., "the fortress of Zaden" of the medieval Georgian chronicles. This fortress and a possible pagan temple was overlooked by Mount Zedazeni ("Upper Zaden") where later a Christian monastery was built. A necropolis of the 1st century BC / 2nd century AD was brought to light early in the 1980s; a bronze batillum and an Italic oenochoe were among the finds.

== See also ==
- Mtskheta-Mtianeti
