= Viktor Kupradze =

Georgian mathematician

- Born: 2 November 1903; Kela, Lanchkhuti Municipality, Georgia
- Died: 25 April 1985 (aged 81); Tbilisi, Georgia
- Education: Tbilisi State University
- Scientific career
- Fields: Mathematics

Viktor Kupradze (Georgian: ვიქტორ კუპრაძე; November 2, 1903 – April 25, 1985) was a Georgian mathematician. Doctor of Physical and Mathematical Sciences (1935), professor (1936). Member of the Georgian Academy of Sciences (1946).

== Biography ==
Viktor Kupradze was born in the village Kela, Lanchkhuti Municipality on November 2, 1903 in the family of a railwayman. After graduating from the Kutaisi Technical School in 1922, he continued his studies at the faculty of Physics and Mathematics at Tbilisi State University. When still young, Kupradze participated actively in publle work. Kupradze published his first scientific work in 1929 at the age of 26. In 1935 he defended his doctor’s thesis. During the Great Patriotic War Kupradze served in the Soviet Army. In 1943 he was demobilized and appointed vice-rector of Tbilisi State University, responsible for research work. From 1944 to 1953 Kupradze worked as Minister of Education of the Georgian SSR. From 1954 to 1958 Kupradze was rector of Tbilisi State University.

In the period from 1946 to 1963 Kupradze was elected member of the General Committee of the Communist Party of Georgia, in 1949–1952 deputy to the Supreme Soviet of the USSR. From 1954 to 1963 he was chairman of the Supreme Soviet of the Georgian SSR. In 1955 he was sent to the United States as a Soviet delegate to the 10th Session of the UN General Assembly.

The rich scientific heritage of Viktor Kupradze is reflected in his more than 100 works, among which there are 5 monographs, which included many fundamental papers in mathematical physics and mechanics, the mathematical theory of elasticity, and problems on the theory of differential and integral equations. His publications on the progress and completion of a number of domains of mathematics made an immense contribution to the field. Many of his works have been translated and published in foreign languages.

Viktor Kupradze was decorated with the Order of Lenin twice, the Order of the Red Banner of Labour, the Badge of Honour and other. In 1971, he was awarded the State Prize of Georgia. The street named after him is located in the Varketili district of Tbilisi.
