= Iakob Nikoladze =

Georgian sculptor and artist

- იაკობ ნიკოლაძე
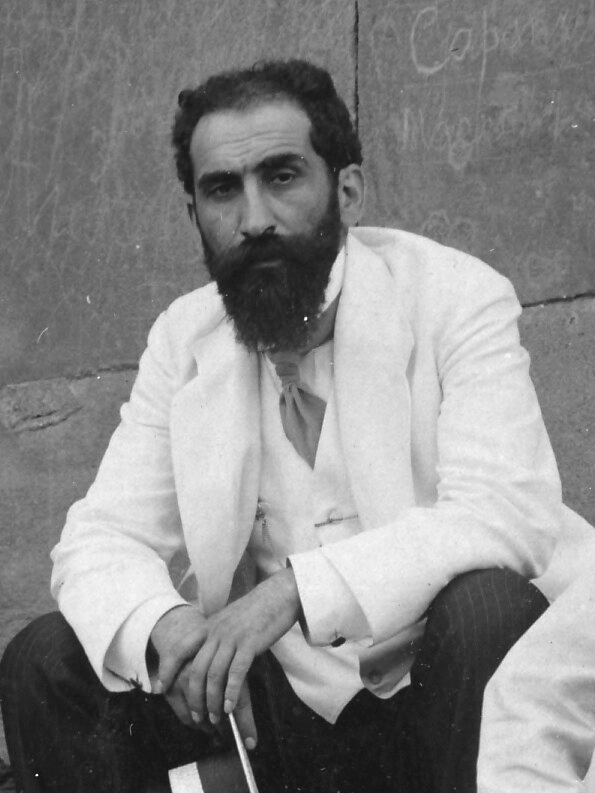
- Born: May 28 [O.S. May 16], 1876; Kutaisi, Kutais Governorate, Russian Empire
- Died: March 10, 1951 (aged 74); Tbilisi, Georgian SSR, Soviet Union
- Resting place: Mtatsminda Pantheon
- Education: Stroganov School for Technical Drawing; Odessa Art School of Drawing
- Notable work: National symbols of the Democratic Republic of Georgia
- Style: Socialist realism
- Awards: State Stalin Prize in Literature, Art and Architecture (1946, 1948); Order of the Badge of Honour (22 March 1936)

Iakob Nikoladze (Georgian: იაკობ ნიკოლაძე; May 28 [O.S. May 16], 1876 – March 10, 1951) was a Georgian nobleman, sculptor and artist. Member of the USSR Academy of Arts from 1947.

== Biography ==
By birth, he was a member of an old Georgian noble (aznauri) family of Nikoladze. He died in 1951.

The Georgian National Museum, Iakob Nikoladze House Museum is dedicated to his works and was established after his death in his home-studio in his native town of Kutaisi. The museum houses sculptures, sketches, photo and documentary materials. He also designed the national symbols of the Democratic Republic of Georgia.

== Awards and honours ==
- Professor (1934)
- People's Illustrator of the Georgian SSR (5 March 1946)
- Stalin Prize 1st class (1946, 1948)
- Order of Lenin (24 February 1946)
- Order of the "Badge of Honour" (22 March 1936)
- Award of the Society for the Encouragement of Fine Arts in Tiflis (1897)
