= Avchala =

Avchala ავჭალა
- district
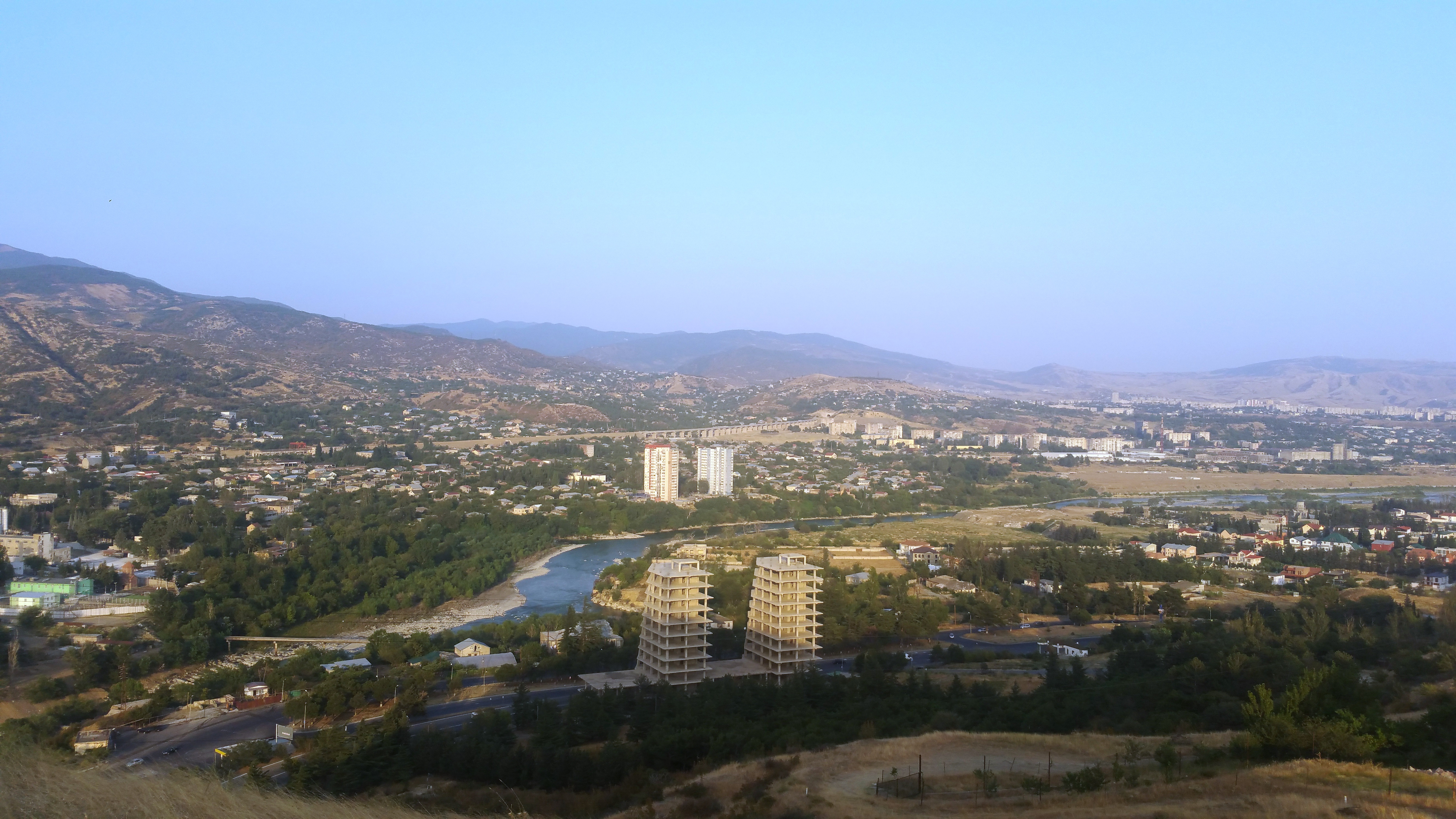

- Location within Tbilisi
- Country: Georgia
- City: Tbilisi
- District: Gldani District
- Time zone: UTC+4 (Georgian Time)

Avchala (Georgian: ავჭალა) is a northern suburb of Tbilisi, the capital of Georgia, part of the city's Gldani District. It had formerly been a village with a long history behind until being incorporated within Tbilisi's boundaries in 1962.

Avchala lies on the left bank of the Mtkvari, at 440 m above sea level. The first Hydro Electric station (Zahes) is located at the upper section of Avchala. It was built in 1927. It is recorded to be the first, most effective Hydro Electric station in the whole of Georgia.

== History ==
It is first recorded in the Georgian Chronicles as a locale where the invading Seljuk Turks made their camp c. 1080. Avchala then frequently appears in medieval accounts. In 1734 it was heavily fortified to secure the northern approaches of Tbilisi against the marauding Dagestani. Under the Russian rule, in 1887, the brooks of Avchala were collected to furnish Tbilisi with water. In 1927, the Zemo Avchala hydro-electric scheme (ZAHES) was completed to provide Tbilisi with electricity and was celebrated as a great achievement of the Soviet government. Later in the Soviet era, Avchala developed as an industrial suburb of Tbilisi, but several of its enterprises are now defunct or half-ruined.
