= Ilia Chavchavadze =

Georgian poet and politician; Georgian Orthodox Church saint (1837–1907)

Tavadi Ilia Chavchavadze
- ილია ჭავჭავაძე
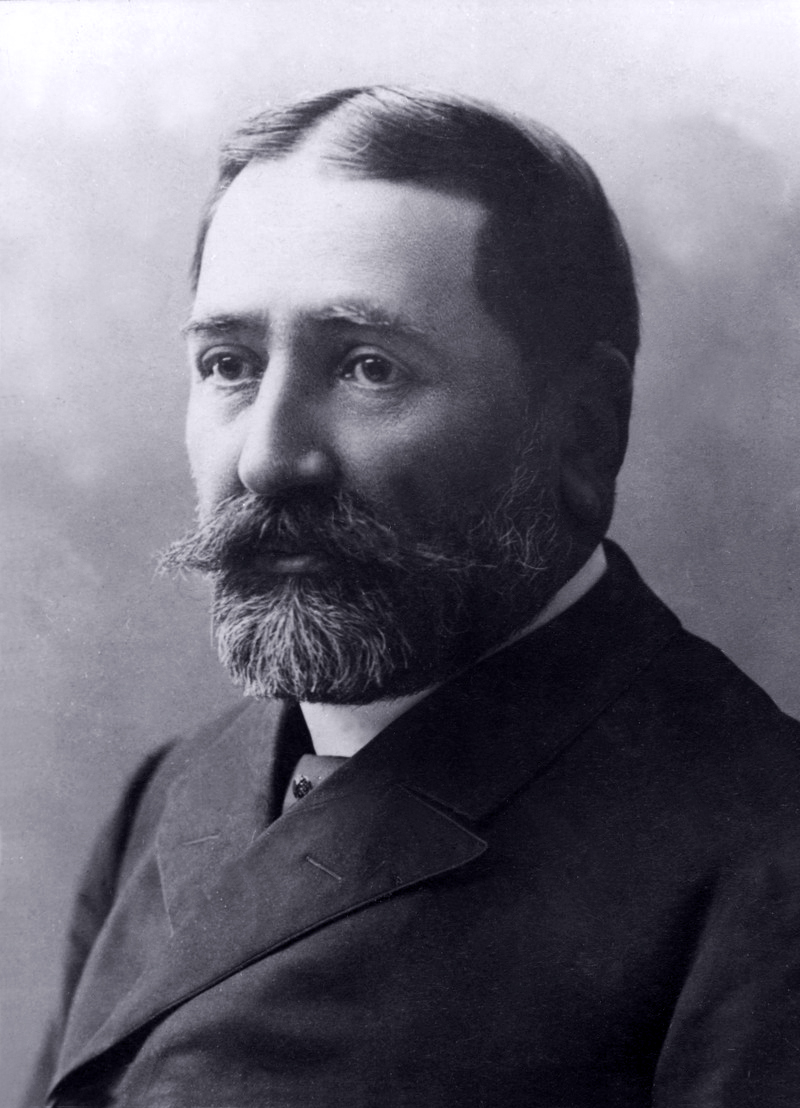
- Born: 8 November [O.S. 27 October] 1837; Kvareli, Georgia Governorate, Russian Empire (present-day Kakheti, Georgia)
- Died: 12 September 1907 (aged 69); Tsitsamuri, Tiflis Governorate, Russian Empire
- Resting place: Mtatsminda Pantheon, Tbilisi
- Occupations: jurist, poet, novelist, humanist, publisher, philosopher
- Writing career
- Movements: Realism; Historical fiction

Tavadi (Prince) Ilia Chavchavadze (Georgian: ილია ჭავჭავაძე; 8 November [O.S. 27 October] 1837 – 12 September 1907) was a Georgian journalist, publisher, writer and poet who spearheaded the revival of Georgian nationalism during the second half of the 19th century in the period of Tsarist rule. To this day, he has been called Georgia's "most universally revered hero" and the "Father of the Nation" of the modern Georgia.

He was a leader of contemporary youth intellectual movement named "Tergdaleulebi" which spread modern and European liberal ideals in Georgia. Chavchavadze founded two modern newspapers: Sakartvelos Moambe and Iveria.

He coined the phrase "Ena, Mamuli, Sartsmunoeba" ("Language, Homeland, Faith"), a slogan of Georgian nationalism. (Note: "The main designer and contributor to the Georgian nationalist project was the eminent Georgian writer and public worker Ilia Chachcavadze (1837–1907).") (Note: "In 1860–1880ss the premature Georgian political nationalism was replaced by fully developed Georgian cultural nationalism. As it was already mentioned, its main author was Ilia Chavchavadze who, with his co-workers, was an active part of the societal life of the 1860s.")

After the 1905 Russian Revolution Chavchavadze's developed a keen interest in the national liberation movement for which he was elected as a representative of the Georgian nobility to the imperial State Council.

Chavchavadze was an outspoken critic of the Bolsheviks and considered the most influential Georgian writer in his day. Because of his great popularity he drew many people among the peasant class away from the idea of radical socialism, which is why many suspect was the reason for his assassination. (Note: The Bolsheviks have a long history of orchestrating revolutionary terrorism and politically motivated assassinations.)

Chavchavadze was killed in Tsitsamuri, near Mtskheta, by a gang of assassins in 1907. It was generally believed that the Bolsheviks and the social Democrats were responsible for his death, but they were able to divert some suspicion against the Tsarist secret police. Local sources were scrutinized, leaving little doubt that the Bolshevicks were responsible for Chavchavadze's brutal death. Later, he was canonized as Saint Ilia the Righteous (წმინდა ილია მართალი, tsminda ilia martali) by the Georgian Orthodox Church.

== Biography ==
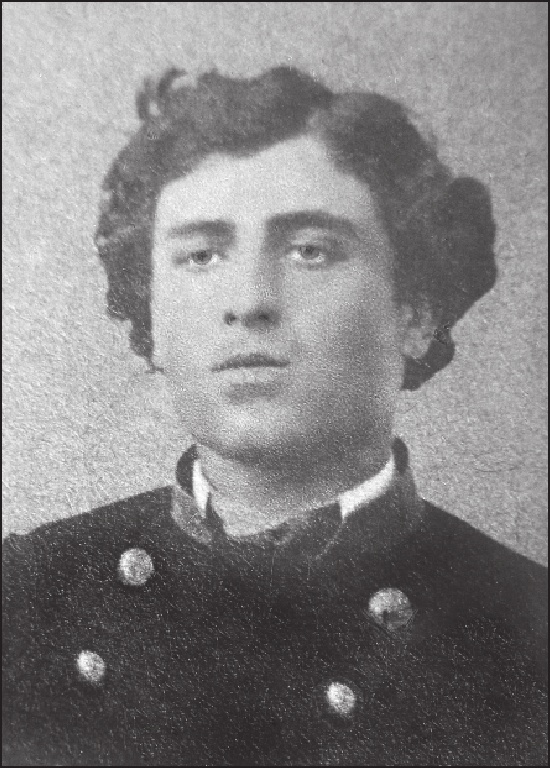
Chavchavadze as a 1st year gymnasium student

=== Early life ===
Chavchavadze was born in Qvareli, a village in Kvareli, located in the Alazani Valley, in the Kakheti province of Georgia, which was part of the Russian Empire at that time. His mother, Mariam, died on 4 May 1848, when he was ten years old, and his father asked his sister, Makrine, to help bring up the children. After 1852, when his father Grigol died, she was the only remaining caretaker of the family. Chavchavadze received his basic education at home. In 1848, after the death of his mother, he was sent to Tbilisi by his father to begin his secondary education.

=== Student years ===
Chavchavadze as a student

After graduating from the academy, Chavchavadze enrolled in the law school at University of St. Petersburg, Russia in 1857. He developed a keen interest in Georgian history and devoted much of his time studying in the Saint Petersburg archives in search of old Georgian texts. Chavchavadze was proven to be an exemplary student with many outstanding academic achievements to his credit. However, this was a priority he held over receiving an official diploma from the school of law. Subsequently he left the academy In his fourth year and returned to Georgia to champion Georgian independence and spearhead a cultural and political revival in his homeland.

=== Political life ===
Ilia Chavchavadze, photographed by Alexander Roinashvili.

At the beginning of the nineteenth century the Georgian national liberation movement began in response to the Russian Empire’s annexation of Georgian lands and the abolition of the centuries-old Bagrationi royal dynasty in 1801.This resulted in deep resentment among Georgian elites and intellectuals who sought to restore independence and preserve their national identity, all of which expressed itself in riots and insurrections that took on greater proportions at the beginning of the 1860s when Chavchavadze and his contemporaries emerged on scene. This generation of public figures is called the Tergdaleulni, or “Georgians of the Sixties”. Chavchavadze was one of the principle figures involved in that tumultuous social conflict. Subsequently Georgian society regarded the Armenians as "parasitic" in Georgia. Chavchavadze expressed this sentiment in an essay on Georgian-Armenian relations, whose views continue to characterize current Georgian attitudes toward Armenians.

The new generation of Georgian intellectuals, educated at Russian universities and exposed to European ideas, promoted national culture against assimilation by the Imperial center. Led by Chavchavadze, their program attained more nationalist colors as the nobility declined and capitalism progressed, further stimulated by the rule of the Russian bureaucracy and economic and demographic dominance of the Armenian bourgeoisie in the capital city of Tbilisi. Chavchavadze prominently founded "The Bank of the Nobility" of Tbilisi, to keep Georgian land from being sold off by poor Georgian nobles to Armenian bourgeoisie. In his work Outcrying Stones, Chavchavadze said Armenians falsified Georgian history, buying up Georgian land and appropriating Georgian churches, as well as indebting poor Georgian peasant families.

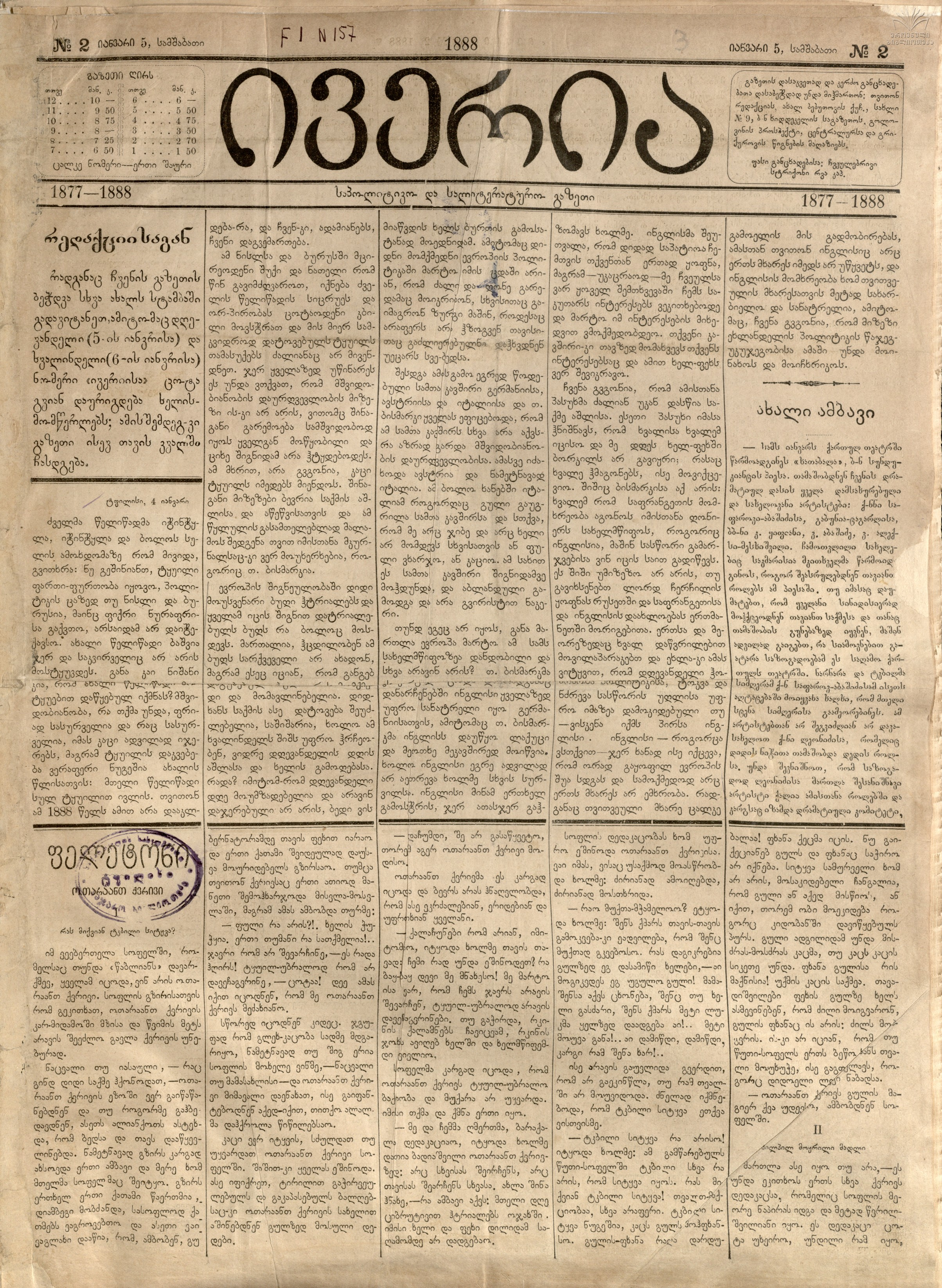
Iveria newspaper, founded and edited by Chavchavadze.

Chavchavadze said in his newspaper Iveria they were "eating the bread baked by someone else or drinking that which is created by another's sweat", and "sly moneylenders and unscrupulous traders". He also created slogan "Language, Homeland, Religion", which was a motto of Georgian nationalism. Chavchavadze and his associates called for the unity of all Georgians and put national interests above class and provincial divisions. They did not envisage an outright revolt for independence, demanding autonomy within the reformed Russian Empire, with greater cultural freedom, promotion of the Georgian language, and support for Georgian educational institutions and the national church, whose independence had been suppressed by the Russian government.

Chavchavadze knew Joseph Stalin when Stalin was an Orthodox seminarian in Tbilisi. According to historian Simon Sebag Montefiore: "The Prince was sufficiently impressed to show the teenager's work to his editors. He admired Stalin's verse, choosing five poems to publish – quite an achievement. Prince Chavchavadze called Stalin the 'young man with the burning eyes.'"

== Death ==
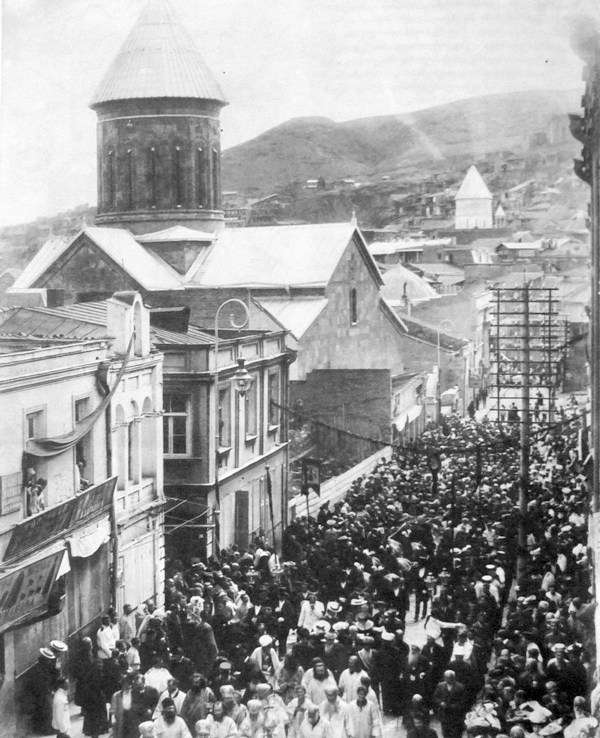
Chavchavadze's funeral in Tbilisi

After serving as a member of the Upper House in the first Russian Duma, Ilia decided to return to Georgia in 1907 where he advocated for a religious Georgian national identity. However, his views were considered to be in serious opposition and threat to those who felt compromised by the idea of a religious Georgian nationality, many of whom held an atheist ideology. Subsequently, on 28 August 1907, while traveling with his wife Olga from Tbilisi to Saguramo, Chavchavadze was ambushed and murdered by a crew of six assassins in the small village of Tsitsamuri, near Mtskheta. The assailants were ultimately captured and sentenced to death, where Chavchavadze's wife pleaded for their forgiveness, feeling that this is what Chavchavadze would have done.

His murder was seen as a national tragedy and was mourned by all classes of Georgian society. Prince Akaki Tsereteli, who was suffering from serious health problems at the time, said at the funeral: "Ilia's inestimable contribution to the revival of the Georgian nation is an example for future generations".

The news coverage of his assassination was primarily limited to a single newspaper called Isari (ისარი).

=== Investigation ===
In 1907, the Tsarist authorities launched investigation into Chavchavadze's death and arrested four suspects: Giorgi Khizanishvili, Ivane Inashvili, Gigola Modzghvrishvili and Tedo Labauri. One suspect (Gigla Berbichashvili, the head of the crew) went into hiding in Iran, while another one (Pavle Aptsiauri) died during clashes with the police. According to investigation, during the incident Chavchavadze appealed to the crew: "Do not shoot, I am Ilia", while Gigla replied: "That's why we have to shoot you". In 1909, according to the decision of the Stolypin tribunal, the entire gang was sentenced to capital punishment. Following the October Revolution, Gigla Berbichashvili returned to Georgia in 1921 and worked in the various positions within the Soviet Georgian government. In 1936, the investigation was launched against him for participating the murder of Ilia Chavchavadze. In December 1941, he was tried in the court, which sentenced him to capital punishment in January 1942. However, this was later changed to 10 years imprisonment.

=== Theories ===
The assassination of Ilia Chavchavadze remains controversial today. The Tsarist investigation concluded that the murderers were part of Bolshevik "Red Squad", while the Soviet investigation blamed the Tsarist secret police and administration for being involved in the assassination. The unofficial versions mostly blame Bolsheviks as well as Mensheviks for orchestrating the murder. (Note: Bolshevik unpopularity in Georgia was in part due to the widely held suspicion that they had been behind the murder of Ilia Chavchavadze in August 1907.) Chavchavadze had publicly and very successfully undermined the growth of both Bolshevik and Menshevik factions of the Social Democratic Labour Party.

According to Montefiore: "The Bolshevik position in Georgia was undermined by the assassination of the hugely popular Prince Ilya Chavchavadze, in August 1907. The Bolsheviks had attacked his patriarchal vision of Georgian culture and, it was widely believed, had decided to kill him. There is some evidence that Stalin's friends Sergo Ordzhonikidze and Filipp Makharadze organized or took part in the assassination. It may be that the Menshevik–Social Democrats took no part in the murder at all. Stalin always praised Chavchavadze's poetry in his old age and there is no evidence that he ordered the hit, but he was very close to Sergo and he was certainly more than capable of separating literary merit from cruel necessity: politics always came first.

== Legacy ==
In 1987 Chavchavadze was formally canonized by the Georgian Orthodox and Apostolic Church, as "Saint Ilia the Righteous."

In 1998 Stephen Kinzer wrote: "Today leftists in Georgia embrace Chavchavadze for his hatred of injustice, centrists love him for his nonviolent humanism, and right-wing nationalists have adopted his slogan Motherland, Language, Faith." Faith, in this context, exclusively means Georgian Orthodoxy.

In 2006, Ilia State University was named after Ilia Chavchavadze. Streets and avenues named after him include Tbilisi's central avenue, Ilia Chavchavadze Avenue.

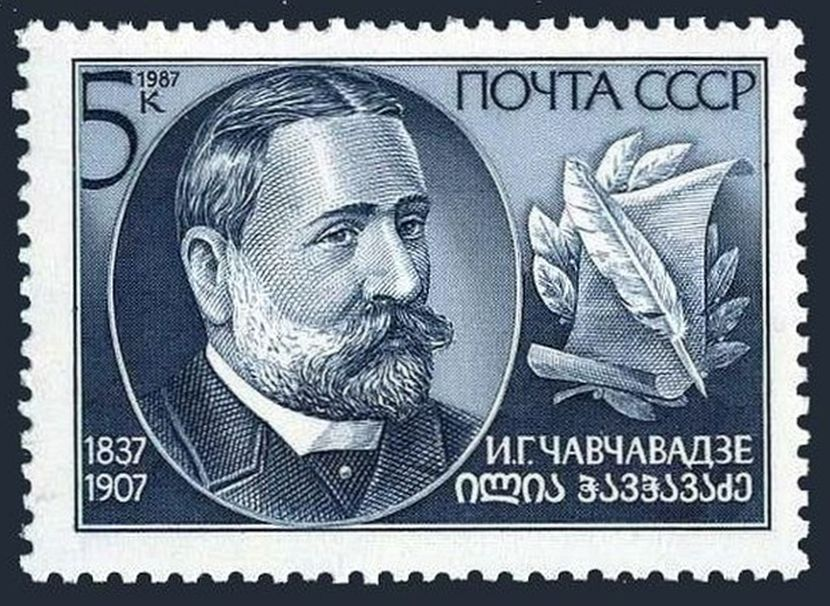
In 1987 the former Soviet Union issued a postage stamp honoring Ilia Chavchavadze

Monument to Chavchavadze (left) and Akaki Tsereteli in Tbilisi

Chavchavadze's tomb at Mtatsminda Pantheon.

== Published works ==
- Georgian Poetry: Rustaveli to Galaktion: A Bilingual Anthology. Translated by Lyn Coffin. Gia Jokhadze (assistance); Dodona Kiziria (introduction). Bloomington, Indiana: Slavica. 2013.
- Georgische Dichter. Translated by Arthur Leist. Translated and compiled by Arthur Leist; includes poems by Ilia Chavchavadze and other Georgian poets in German. Dresden and Leipzig. 1887.
- Ilia Chavchavadze (1895). The Hermit (PDF). Translated by Marjory Wardrop. London: Bernard Quaritch.

== See also ==
- Chavchavadze
- List of Georgian writers
- Ilia State University
- Russian Revolution of 1905
- Russian Revolution of 1917
- Zviad Gamsakhurdia (1939 – 1993) – Georgian politician human rights activist

== Bibliography ==
- Abashidze, Zaza; Grdzelidze, Tamara; George, Martin (2006). Witness Through Troubled Times: A History of the Orthodox Church of Georgia, 1811 to the Present. Bennett & Bloom. ISBN 978-1-8989-4868-1.
- Asatiani, Nodar; Janelidze, Otar (2009). Janelidze History Of Georgia. University of Georgia Press. ISBN 978-0-8203-1269-9.
- de Baye, Joseph (1899). Au Nord de la chaîne du Caucase: Souvenir d'une mission (in French). Paris: Nilsson.
- de Baye, Joseph (1900). Tiflis: souvenirs d'une mission (in French). Paris: Nilsson.
- Chkhartishvili, Mariam (2013). "Georgian nationalism and the idea of Georgian nation" (PDF). Codrul Cosminului. 19 (2). Ștefan cel Mare University of Suceava: 189–206. Archived from the original (PDF) on 21 August 2014.
- Geifman, Anna (1993). Thou shalt kill : revolutionary terrorism in Russia, 1894-1917. Princeton, N.J. : Princeton University Press. ISBN 978-0-691-08778-8.
- Jones, Stephen F. (2005). Socialism in Georgian Colors: The European Road to Social Democracy, 1883-1917. Harvard University Press. p. 221. ISBN 9780674019027.
- Leist, Arthur (1903). Das georgische Volk, geschildert von Arthur Leist (in German). Dresden: E. Pierson.
- Lehmann-Haupt, Ferdinand Friedrich Carl (1910). Armenia, Past and Present: Travels and Research (in German). Berlin: B. Behr. pp. 106–111.
- Montefiore, Simon Sebag (2007). Young Stalin. New York : Alfred A. Knopf. ISBN 978-1-4000-4465-8.
- Ram, Harsha (Fall 2008). "Masks of the Poet, Myths of the People: The Performance of Individuality and Nationhood in Georgian and Russian Modernism". Slavic Review. 67 (3): 567–590. doi:10.2307/27652940. JSTOR 27652940.
- Reisner, Oliver: The Tergdaleulebi: Founders of Georgian National Identity. In: Ladislaus Löb, István Petrovics, György E. Szonyi (eds.): Forms of Identity: Definitions and Changes. Attila Jozsef University, Szeged 1994, pp. 125–37
- Simashvili, Tengiz. "Joseph Jughashvili (Stalin) and Murder of Ilia Chavchavadze". Journal of Social Sciences and Humanities. 2 (July 2020).
- Wardrop, John Oliver (1888). The Kingdom of Georgia. London: S. Low, Marston, Searle & Rivington. pp. 150–152. "Notes of Travel in a Land of Women, Wine, and Song; to which are Appended Historical, Literary and Political Sketches, Specimens of the National Music, and a Compendious Bibliography"
