= Nikoloz Muskhelishvili =

Georgian mathematician (1891–1976)

- ნიკოლოზ მუსხელიშვილი Николай Мусхелишвили
- Muskhelishvili in 1940
- Born: 16 February [O.S. 4 February] 1891; Tiflis, Tiflis Governorate, Russian Empire
- Died: 15 July 1976 (aged 85); Tbilisi, Georgian SSR, Soviet Union
- Education: Saint Petersburg State University
- Known for: Participating in the development of the first space satellite; founder of Georgian State Academy
- Awards: Hero of Socialist Labour
- Scientific career
- Fields: Theoretical and applied mathematics, physics and mechanics
- Workplaces: Saint Petersburg State University; Transcaucasus Academy of Sciences; Academy of Sciences Georgian SSR; Polytechnic Institute; Numerous other Soviet and foreign institutions Cooperation with OKB research labs.
- Doctoral students: Mark Vishik

Nikoloz (Niko) Muskhelishvili (Georgian: ნიკოლოზ (ნიკო) მუსხელიშვილი; 16 February [O.S. 4 February] 1891 – 15 July 1976) was a Soviet Georgian mathematician, physicist and engineer who was one of the founders and first President (1941–1972) of the Georgian SSR Academy of Sciences (now Georgian National Academy of Sciences).

== Life and career ==
Muskhelishvili was born on 16 February [O.S. 4 February] 1891 in Tbilisi, then part of the Russian Empire into a family of engineers. He graduated from local grammar school in 1909 and afterwards from the Physics and Mathematics Faculty of Saint Petersburg in 1914. Immediately after his graduation he became head of Applied Mathematics of the same faculty and in 1918 passed the exam for the master's degree. His first scientific magazine was published already earlier in 1915 containing a number of issues on elasticity theory. From 1917 to 1920 he worked as assistant director of the Petrograd University and also taught mathematics in other institutions in Saint Petersburg. At request of the short-lived Democratic Republic of Georgia he moved back to his native country in 1920 in order to organize the establishment of a national scientific school. There Muskhelishvili conducted lessons in the Tbilisi State University and Polytechnic Institute as an assistant professor and from 1922 to 1938 as head professor. After the Soviet invasion of Georgia in 1921, Muskhelishvili was allowed to carry on his works in the Transcaucasian Soviet Academy of Sciences and since 1933 was corresponding member of the USSR Academy of Sciences. He became a member of the CPSU in 1940.

In 1941 based on the former Georgian Academy of Sciences a new USSR Academy of Sciences was established by the Georgian SSR and Muskhelishvili got elected as its first president and academician. Simultaneously he also became director of the Tbilisi Mathematics Institute named after AM Rasmadze, and held that position until his death in 1976.

From 1956 to 1976 Muskhelishvili was chairman of the National Committee of the USSR on Theoretical and Applied Mechanics (established by the Decree of the Presidium of the Academy of Sciences). Since 1957 he was also member of the Presidium of the Academy of Sciences. In 1972 due to health problems the professor resigned from the post of president of the Georgian SSR Academy of Sciences but in recognition for his outstanding achievements and services was elected honorary president of the academy. He was also an academician and honorary professor of the Academies of Sciences of the Armenian and Azerbaijani SSRs since 1961. Muskhelishvili was an honorary member of the Bulgarian Academy of Sciences since 1952, Polish Academy of Sciences since 1960 and the Berlin Academy of Sciences since 1967. He also held the position of deputy chairman of the Supreme Soviet of the Soviet Union in eight convocations from 1937 to 1974.

Nikoloz Muskhelishvili died on 15 July 1976 in Tbilisi and is buried in the Mtatsminda Pantheon.

== Contributions to science ==
Muskhelishvili conducted fundamental research on the theories of physical elasticity, Integral equations, Boundary value problems and other. He was one of the first to apply the theory of functions of complex variables to the problems of elasticity theories, proposing a number of techniques that have been successfully implemented in numerous areas of mathematics, theoretical physics and mechanics. His works solved all major problems of the Plane Elasticity Theory opening a wide class of domains reducing the plane problem to finite systems of linear algebraic equations c singular kernels. He is also credited with major contributions to the theory of linear boundary value problems for analytic functions and one-dimensional integral equations. Muskhelishvili is the author of various scientific articles, monographs and textbooks on mathematics which have been used by universities since their publishing. Highest regarded ones are the monographs "Some basic problems of the mathematical theory of elasticity" (1933) and "Singular Integral Equations" (1947).

=== Involvement in military research ===
During World War II Muskhelishvili was responsible for retargeting the preoccupation of the Academy of Science to national defense. He completed a series of research, experimental and theoretical work in different areas of applied mathematics, physics and mechanics, which all had great practical importance and decisive impact on the development of a range of military hardware during and after the war. However, the exact scale is unknown and classified. His achievements and involvement in the defense sphere earned him several awards, including the Medal "For the Defence of the Caucasus". He got also awarded for the launch of the world's first artificial satellite into space in 1961 on which development he had contributed as well. Muskhelishvili was a renowned specialist in engineering able to apply a lot of his theories and solutions, including torsion bar suspension for tracked vehicles such as tanks. Most of his research, theories, and ideas were considered and implemented for the development of certain vehicles during the Cold War, some of which already originated from his earlier theoretical work during World War II, on the elasticity of specific material under specific circumstances such as different temperature, weight, composition etc. His work practically applied to anything from land-based vehicles to aircraft, rockets, and satellites.

=== Membership in scientific academies ===
- Corresponding Member of the USSR Academy of Sciences
- Academician of the USSR Academy of Sciences
- Academician of Academy of Sciences of the Georgian SSR
- Honorary Academician of Armenian Academy of Sciences
- Honorary Academician of Azerbaijan Academy of Sciences
- Foreign Member of Bulgarian Academy of Sciences
- Foreign Member of Polish Academy of Sciences
- Foreign Member of German (Berlin) Academy of Sciences

=== Notable awards ===
- Hero of Socialist Labour (1945)
- Stalin Prize (1941), (1947)
- Order of Lenin (1941), (1945), (1952), (1961), (1966), (1975)
- Order of the October Revolution (1970)
- Order of the Red Banner of Labour (1944)
- Gold Medal of the Turin Academy of Sciences (1969)
- Gold Medal of the Slovak Academy of Sciences (1970)
- Cyril and Methodius I degree (1970)
- Lomonosov Gold Medal (1972)

The Georgian Academy of Sciences established a prize named after Nikoloz Muskhelishvili.

=== Main publications ===
- "On the equilibrium of elastic circular disks under the influence of stresses applied at the points of their encirclement and acting in their domains". (Russian), Izv. Electrotekhnich. Inst., Petrograd, 12 (1915), 39–55 (jointly with G. V. Kolosov).
- "On thermal stresses in the plane problem of the theory of elasticity". (Russian), Izv. Electrotekhnich. Inst., Petrograd, 13 (1916), 23–37.
- "On defining a harmonic function by conditions given on the contour". (Russian) Zh. Fiz.-mat.ob-va, Perm Univ., 1918, (1919), Issue I, 89–93.
- "Applications des intégrales analogues à celles de Cauchy et quelques problèmes de la physique mathématique". - Tiflis, Edition de l'Université de Tiflis, Imprimerie de l'Etat, 1922.
- "On periodic orbits in closed geodesic lines (abstract)". (Russian) Trans. All-Russian Math. Congr. Moscow, April 27–May 4, 1927, Moscow-Leningrad, 1928,189.
- "On some contour problems of plane hydrodynamics".(Russian) Proc.of All-Russian Math. Congr. Moscow-Leningrad, 1928, 262.
- "Zum Problem der Torsion der homogenen isotropen Prismen". Izv. Tiflis. polit.in-ta, 1 (1929), part 1, 1-–20.
- "Nouvelle méthode de rèduction du problème biharmonique fondamental à une equation de Fredholm". C. R. Acad. Sci.,192 (1931), No. 2, 77–79.
- "Théorèmes d'existence relatifs au problème biharmonique et aux problèmes d'élasticité a deux dimensions". C. R. Acad. Sci., 192 (1931), No. 4, 221–223.
- "To the problem of torsion and bending of elastic bars composed of various materials. (Russian). Izv. AN SSSR, OMEN, 1932, iss.7, 907–945.
- "To the problem of torsion and bending of composite elastic beams". (Russian) Izv. Inzh. Inst. Gruzii, 1932, iss. I, 123–127.
- "Some basic problems of the mathematical theory of elasticity. Basic Equations, the plane problem, torsion and bending (Foreword by Acad. A. N. Krilov)". (Russian) Acad. Sci. USSR, Leningrad, 1933.
- "Singular integral equations, boundary value problems of the function theory and some of their applications to mathematical physics (Russian)", Moscow -Leningrad, 1946.
- "Sur le problème de torsion des poutres élastiques composées". C. R. Acad. Sci., 194 (1932), No. 17, 1435–1437.
- "Recherches sur des problèmes aux limites relatifs à l'équation biharmonique et aux équations de l'élasticité à deux dimensions". Math. Ann., 1932, Bd. 107, No. 2, 282–312.
- "Solution of a plane problem of the theory of elasticity for a solid ellipse". (Russian) PMM, I (1933), is. I, 5–12.
- "Praktische Lösung der fundamentalen Randwertaufgaben der Elastizitätstheorie in der Ebene fur einige Berandungsformen". Z. Angew. Math. und Mech., 1933, Bd. 13, No. 14, 264–282.
- "Sur l'équivalence de deux méthodes de reduction du problème plan biharmonique à une équation intégrale". C. R. Acad. Sci., 196 (1933), No. 26, 1947–1948 (avec V. Fock).
- "A new general method of the solution of the basic boundary value problems of the plane theory of elasticity". (Russian) DAN SSSR, 3 (1934), No. 1, 7–11.
- "Investigation of new integral equations of the plane theory of elasticity". (Russian) DAN SSSR, 3 (1934), No. 2, 73–77.
- "On a new boundary value problem of the theory of elasticity". (Russian) DAN SSSR, 3 (1934),141–144.
- "A new method of the solution of plane problems of the theory of elasticity". (Russian) Bull. II All-Union Math. Congr. in Leningrad, June 24–30, Leningrad, 1934, 68 (Abstract).
- "Solution of the basic mixed problem of the theory of elasticity for half-plane". (Russian) DAN SSSR, 3(1935), No. 2, 51-–53.
- "Theory of elasticity". (Russian) Big Soviet Encycl., 56 (1936), 147–158.
- "A new method of solution of plane problems of the theory of elasticity (Abstract)". (Russian) Trans. II All-Union Math. Congr. in Leningrad, June 24–30, 2 (1934), Leningrad-Moscow, 1936, 345–346.
- "On the numerical solution of a plane problem of the theory of elasticity". (Georgian). Trans. Tbil. Math. Inst., 1 (1937), 83–87.
- Transl. editing: Chapters 7–9. In the book by F. Frank and R. Mizes "Differential and Integral equations of Mathematical Physics". Part 2. Transl. edited by L. E. Gurevich. Leningrad-Moscow, 1937, 224–346.
- "On the solution of the basic boundary value problems of the theory of Newtonean potential". (Russian) PMM, 4 (1940), iss. 4, 3–26.
- "On the solution of the basic contour problems of the logarithmic potential theory". (Russian). Trans. Tbil. Math. Inst., 7 (1939), 1–24 (jointly with L. Z. Avazashvili).
- "On the solution of the Dirichlet problem on a plane". (Russian) Bull. Georgian Branch USSR Acad. Sci., 1 (1940), No. 2, 99–106.
- "Remarks on the basic boundary value problems of the potential theory". (Russian) Bull. Georgian Branch USSR Acad. Sci., 1 (1940), No. 3, 169–170. Amendments to the Paper, ditto, No. 7, 567.
- "Application of integrals of the Cauchy type to one class of singular integral equations". (Russian) Trans. Tbil. Mat. Inst., 10 (1941), 1–43, 161–162.
- "On the basic mixed boundary value problem of the logarithmic potential theory for multiply connected domains". (Russian) Bull. Acad. Sci. Georgian SSR,2(1941), No. 4, 309–313.
- "Basic boundary value problems of the theory of elasticity for a half-plane". (Russian) Bull Acad. Sci. Georgian SSR, 2 (1941), No. 10, 873–880.
- "Singular integral equations with a Cauchy type kernel on open contours". (Russian) Trans. Tbil. Math. Inst. Acad. Sci. Georgian SSR, 2 (1942), 141–172 (jointly with D. A. Kveselava).
- "Basic boundary value problems of the theory of elasticity for a plane with rectilinear cuts". (Russian) Bull. Acad. Sci. Georgian SSR, 3 (1942), No. 2, 103–110.
- "To the problem of equilibrium of a rigid punch at the boundary of an elastic half-plane in the presence of friction". (Russian) Bull. Acad. Sci. Georgian SSR,43(1942), No. 5, 413–418.
- "Systems of singular integral equations with Cauchy type kernels". (Russian) Bull. Acad. Sci. Georgian SSR, 3 (1942), No. 10, 987–984.
- "Riemann boundary value problem for several unknown functions and its applications to systems of singular integral equations". (Russian) Trans. Tbil. math. Inst., 12(1943), 1–46 (jointly with N. P. Vekua).
- "Applications of the theory of analytic functions to the theory of elasticity". (Russian) All-Union Congr. on theoretical and Applied Mechanics. Report Abstracts. Moscow, 1960, 142–143 (jointly with I. N. Vekua).
- "Methods of the theory of analytic functions in the theory of elasticity". (Russian) Trans. All-Union Congr. on Theoretical and Applied Mechanics (1960). Moscow-Leningrad, USSR Acad. Sci. Publ., 1962, 310-388 (jointly with I. N. Vekua).
- "Applications of the theory of functions of a complex variable to the theory of elasticity". In the book: "Application of the theory of functions in solid medium mechanics". (Russian) v. VII, Nauka, Moscow, 1965, 32–55. Ditto in English: 56–75.

== See also ==
- List of Georgians
- Torsion bar suspension
- Elasticity (physics)
- Science and technology in the Soviet Union
