= Fahrettin Çiloğlu =

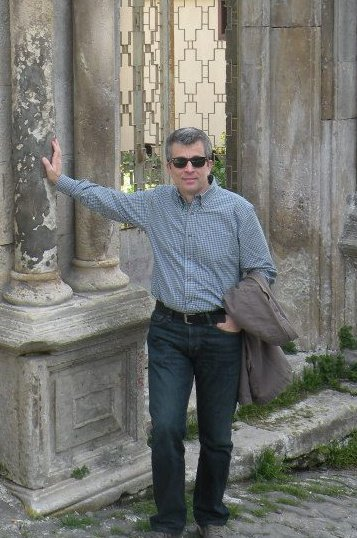
- Born: October 5, 1956 (age 69); Ünye, Ordu Province, Turkey
- Education: Journalism
- Occupations: Editor, translator, poet, story writer
- Writing career
- Pen name: Parna-Beka Chilashvili (Georgian publications)
- Language: Turkish, Georgian

Fahrettin Çiloğlu (born October 5, 1956, Ünye, Ordu Province, Turkey), is a Turkish writer and translator, whose family emigrated from Georgia in the late nineteenth century. In Georgian publications and Turkish translations, he uses the pen name ფარნა-ბექა ჩილაშვილი (Parna-Beka Chilashvili) and Parna-Beka Çilaşvili.

== Biography ==
Of Georgian ancestry, Çiloğlu studied journalism in Istanbul, and worked for many years as an editor specializing in encyclopedias and as a director of publications. In addition to writing numerous journal and newspaper articles, he has also translated fiction and non-fiction works from Georgian to Turkish. He was the editor of the bilingual Turkish-Georgian magazine Pirosmani, which was published in Istanbul between 2007 and 2010.

Fahrettin Çiloğlu is a member of the Turkish PEN club.

== Fiction ==
Fahrettin Çiloğlu's first literary publications consisted of poems which appeared in journals such as İnsancıl and Adam Sanat. This was followed by short stories and his first story was published by the journal Üçüncü Öyküler in İzmit. Later short stories appeared in Üçüncü Öyküler as well as journals such as Adam Öykü and kitap-lık. In 2004, he published a book of poetry titled Nisan Şiirleri (April Poems) as well as a book of short stories titled Beni Bırak Uzaklara ("Carry Me Far Away") and his diurnal notes titled Aşksız Mutluluk Yoktur ("No Happiness without Love"). Çiloğlu published his poems in Georgian and short stories translated from Turkish into Georgian under the title სასაზღვრო ფიქრები ("Border Thoughts") in 2006 in Tbilisi. He published his second book of short stories in Turkish in 2007 under the title Uçinmaçini. A writer in both Turkish and Georgian, Çiloğlu has most recently published a new book of short stories titled სანამ თოვს ("While It Is Snowing") in Tbilisi (2012). One of the stories in this book was first published in German with the title "Die Reise meiner Großmutter nach Istanbul" ("My Grandmother’s Journey to Istanbul") in the anthology, Unser Istanbul (2008, Berlin). In 2016, a children's book he wrote in Turkish was translated into Georgian and published with the title ნამცეცა (Namtsetsa; "Tiny").

== Non-fiction ==
Among Çiloğlu's non-fiction works in Turkish is Gürcülerin Tarihi (Istanbul, 1993), a survey of Georgian history, which includes the history of Georgian people in Turkey. In order to introduce Georgian letters in Turkey, Fahrettin Çiloğlu adapted the book Deda Ena / დედა ენა ("Mother Tongue") by Iakob Gogebashvili —the founder of scientific pedagogy in Georgia— for the benefit of Turkish speakers. Çiloğlu is also one of the authors of the book Contrasts and Solutions in the Caucasus edited by Ole Høiris and Sefa Martin Yürükel in 1998. His essays in Turkish which were published in various places between 2003 and 2009 were translated into Georgian and published in Georgia as a book titled "A Drop of Lemon" ("ერთი წვეთი ლიმონი").

== Translations ==
Çiloğlu has translated the following works of Georgian literature into Turkish:

- Lambalo and Kasha (ლამბალო და ყაშა) by Mikheil Javakhishvili (Turkish: Lambalo ve Kaşa, 2018; ISBN 9786058262188)
- Vano and Niko (ვანო და ნიკო) by Erlom Akhvlediani (Turkish: Vano ile Niko, 2017; ISBN 9786059203555)
- I am that One (მე ის ვარ) by Naira Gelashvili (Turkish: Ben Oyum, 2017; ISBN 978-605-91587-1-8)
- Kvachi Kvachantiradze (კვაჭი კვაჭანტირაძე) by Mikheil Javakhishvili (Turkish: Madrabaz Kvaçi, 2015; ISBN 9786056685071)
- A Man Was Going Down the Road (გზაზე ერთი კაცი მიდიოდა) by Otar Chiladze (Turkish: Yolda Bir Adam Gidiyordu, 2015; ISBN 9786059115582)
- The Sunny Night (მზიანი ღამე) by Nodar Dumbadze (Turkish: Güneşli Gece, 2015; ISBN 978-605-4708-63-5)
- Mosquito in the City (კოღო ქალაქში) by Erlom Akhvlediani (Turkish: Sivrisinek Şehirde, 2014; ISBN 978-605-4708-87-1)
- Jeans Generation (ჯინსების თაობა) by David Turashvili (Turkish: Blucinliler, 2012; ISBN 978-605-4484-08-9)
