= David of Gareji =

Georgian saint

Saint David of Gareji
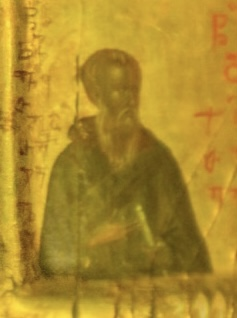
- David on 14th-century triptych, kept at the Saint Catherine's Monastery on Mount Sinai

Bishop, Preacher
- Born: Byzantine Empire
- Died: Kingdom of Iberia
- Venerated in: Eastern Orthodox Church
- Major shrine: David Gareji Lavra
- Feast: May 7 First Thursday after Ascension of Jesus
- Patronage: Georgia

David of Gareji (Georgian: დავით გარეჯელი, romanized: davit garejeli; lit. 'David who sits outside') (fl. 6th century) was an anchorite, Desert Father, wonderworker and one of the thirteen Assyrian Apostles of the Kingdom of Iberia. He is venerated as a saint in the Eastern Orthodox Church.

== Life ==
David was a disciple of John of Zedazeni. David founded David Gareji monastery, with his disciples Dodo and Lukiane. David decided to leave the monastery and go on a pilgrimage to Jerusalem with a group of his disciples. After reaching Palestine, however, he only climbed one of the hills surrounding the city but did not enter its gates, considering himself a sinner and finding himself, approaching “the summit of Grace”, unworthy to walk in the footsteps of Jesus. He also refused to meet with Elijah, the Patriarch of Jerusalem. He took three stones from the Holy Land and departed for Iberia. Elijah's envoys caught up with David near Nablus and took two stones back per the patriarch's command in order "not to take away the full grace of Jerusalem" with him. David brought back only one stone to Iberia, which later became famous in the Georgian kingdom as a miracle-working stone. The event demonstrates the traffic in liturgical goods between Georgia and the Holy Land. The relic, referred to as the "stone of grace", was believed to have the power of healing and was worshipped and highly venerated by different pilgrims of the Christian east and even Muslim visitors. Having returned to the monastery David stayed there until the end of his life. He died in the second half of the 6th century and was buried in David Gareji Lavra. In the late Middle Ages, a period in which Georgia was often invaded, the David Gareji Monastery was subject to a series of destructive raids and, in order to protect this most sacred relic, the stone was frequently hidden in different places. Since the 1990s, the miracle stone of David, has been kept at the Sameba Cathedral in Georgia's capital, Tbilisi.

== Veneration ==
In the 9th century, on the initiative of Hilarion the Iberian, David's tomb was turned into a place of public worship. Orthodox hagiography calls him "the founder of the Georgian Thebaid" and counts him among the most venerated saints and patrons of the Georgian Church. His vita, "Life and Deeds of Our Saint Father David of Gareji" was composed in one of the Georgian monasteries of Mount Athos, in the circle of the disciples of Euthymius the Iberian. In 2000, with the blessing of His Holiness Ilia II, Catholicos-Patriarch of All Georgia, David's tomb was opened and cleaned. Archaeological findings demonstrated the relevance and accuracy of the written sources and the local monastic traditions.

== Bibliography ==
- Bartal, R. Bodner, N. & Kuhnel, B. (2017) Natural Materials of the Holy Land and the Visual Translation of Place, 500-1500, Taylor & Francis, ISBN 978-1-351-80928-3
- Rayfield, D. (2013) The Literature of Georgia: A History, Taylor & Francis, ISBN 978-1-136-82529-3
- Eastmond, A. (2010) Royal Imagery in Medieval Georgia, Pennsylvania State University Press, ISBN 978-0-271-04391-3
- Tchekhanovets, Y. (2018) The Caucasian Archaeology of the Holy Land: Armenian, Georgian and Albanian Communities Between the Fourth and Eleventh Centuries CE, ISBN 978-90-04-36555-1
- Charkiewicz, J. (2005) Gruzińscy święci, Warszawa: Warszawska Metropolia Prawosławna, ISBN 978-83-60311-87-5
