= Turashvili =

Turashvili is a surname. Notable people with the surname include:

- David Turashvili (born 1966), Georgian writer
- Otar Turashvili (born 1986), Georgian-born Romanian rugby union player
