= Dodo church =

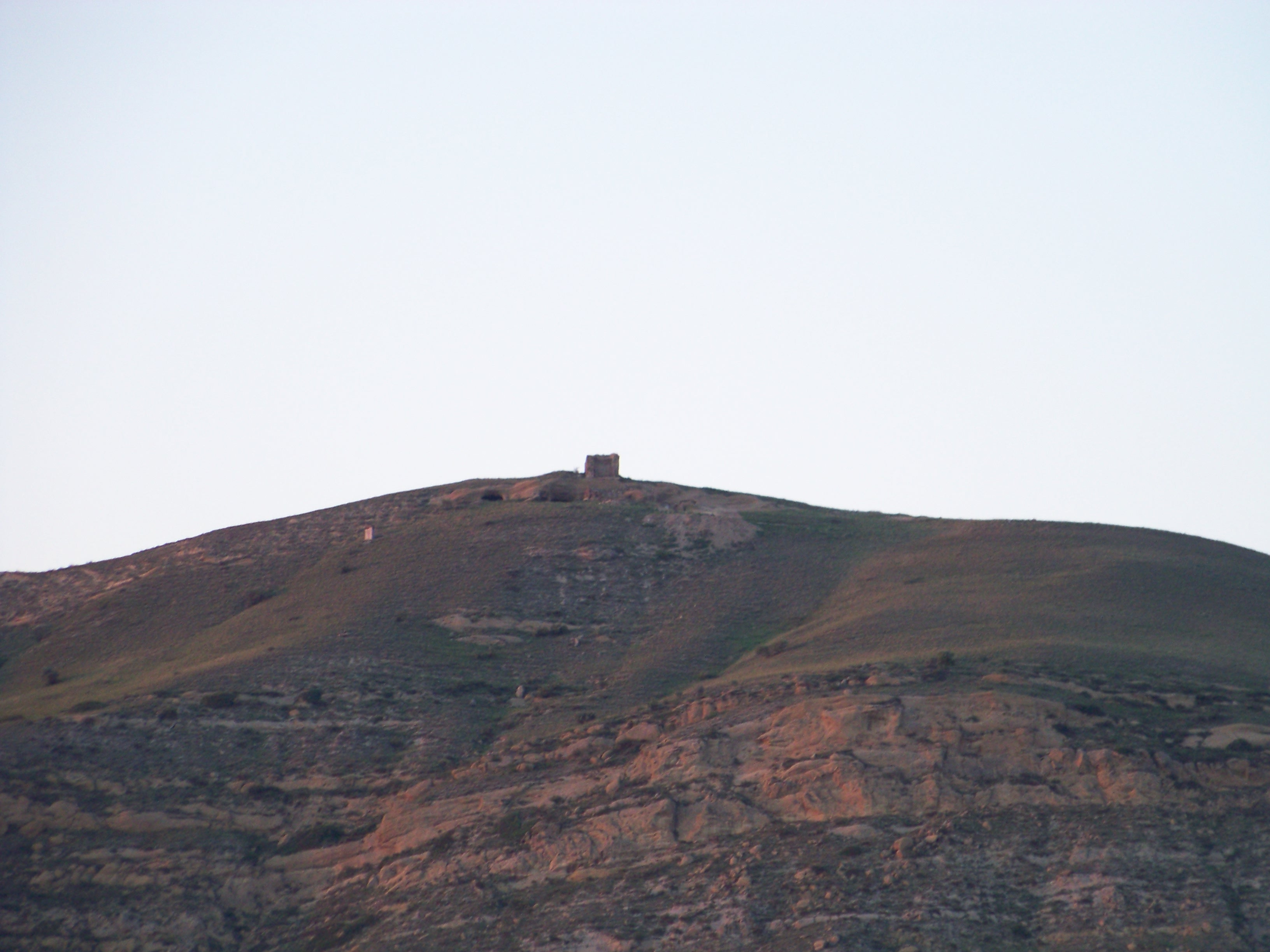

The Dodo Horn (Georgian: დოდოს რქა), romanized: dodos rka) also known as Dodo church is a historical and architectural monument in the monastic complex of David Gareja

== History ==
The church was founded by Dodo, one of the students of David of Gareji in the first half of the 6th century. Its history is directly linked to the general history of the monastery. In the thirteenth and eighteenth centuries the church was subjected to attacks by the Mongol dynasties, Teymurilar, Seljuks and Safavids, being sacked and abandoned repeatedly.

== Architecture ==
The church consists of a complex of caves of various periods (VI-XVIII centuries). The main hall dates from the 11th-13th centuries. Used as a sanctuary, the most important and ancient part of the small church is in the corner of the rock.

The main hall of the church is decorated with frescoes of great historical and cultural importance. The fresco on the central altar illustrates the blessing of Jesus, holding a closed book with a Georgian alphabet in his left hand. Also shown are some of the archangels such as Michael and Gabriel, as well as cherubs.

== Literature ==
- Chubinashvili N., Peshcher Monastery, David Gareji, T., 1948.
