= Monastery of Saint John =

Monastery of Saint John may refer to:

- Saint John monastery (Böyük Tağlar), Azerbaijan
- Patriarchal Stavropegic Monastery of St. John the Baptist, Essex, England
- Monastery of St John, Pontefract, Yorkshire, England
- Saint John monastery or Natlismtsemeli monastery, Georgia
- Monastery of Saint John the Theologian, Patmos, Greece
- Monastery of St. John Theristis, Italy
- Monastery of St. John in the Wilderness, Jerusalem
- Saint John the Baptist Orthodox Monastery, at Al-Maghtas, Jordan
- Saint John Bigorski Monastery, North Macedonia
- Monastery of St John the Studite, Constantinople, Turkey
- Monastery of St. John the Baptist, at Qasr al-Yahud, West Bank
