= Timote Gabashvili =

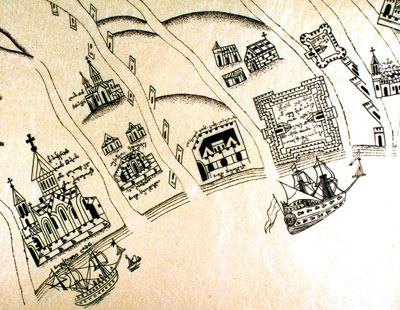
Detail from a map of Georgian coastal fortifications, by Timote Gabashvili, 1737

Churches of St. George and Savior of Chkhari (excerpt from Timote Gabashvili's 1737 Imereti map)

Timote (Timothy) Gabashvili (Georgian: ტიმოთე გაბაშვილი) (1703–1764) was a Georgian travel writer, traveler, diplomat, cartographer, religious and public figure. He was the first to describe the Georgian antiquities of Jerusalem on his visit to the Holy Land in the 1750s. Timote Gabashvili was a highly educated Georgian figure who was well versed in philosophy, theology and the history of religion. He also knew Russian, Greek and Turkish. Author of an essay in the memoir genre – "Mimosvla", which provides historical, ethnographic, geographical information.

== Biography ==
Very little information is available about Timote Gabashvili and his life and work can not be fully restored. The first to write about Timothe was Ioane Batonishvili. Only the part of Ioane Batonishvili's information that is collected from the "Mimosvla" is reliable.

The first attempt to write a biography of Timote Gabashvili belongs to Platon Ioseliani. But this biographical essay is built on poor and, in many cases, inaccurate references.

Brief scientific analysis and evaluation of Timote Gabashvili's works belongs to Academician Korneli Kekelidze. According to Korneli Kekelidze, Timote Gabashvili belonged to the branch of the Kartli Aznavours from which Zakaria and Besarion Gabashvili came from.

According to Alexander Khakhanov, Timote Gabashvili was a student of Besarion Catholicos.

Based on the available materials, it can be assumed that before leaving for Imereti, Timothe worked in the Gareji Natlismtsemeli Monastery in Kakheti, that is, where he was ordained a monk until 1729 and Besarion Orbelishvili was engaged in writing. This is confirmed by Besarion Orbelishvili's "Grdemli" which is copied by Timothe.

In the early 1730s, Timothy moved to Imereti. During these years, the powerful Ottomans in Imereti greatly oppressed the central government, as well as the people and the church. Together with the Catholicos, Timothy was actively involved in state and ecclesiastical affairs. By working in this field, Timothy soon earned the trust of Alexander V, King of Imereti.

=== Ambassador to Russia for the first time ===
In historical documents Timothe appears from 1737, from the time when Timote Gabashvili was sent to Russia by King Alexander V of Imereti to ask for help against the ottomans with Shanshe Eristavi.

In the Persian-Ottoman war of 1730–1735, the Georgians sided with Iran and expelled the Ottomans from Kartli-Kakheti. They considered Iranian domination to be less evil than the Ottoman rule. But Nadir Shah introduced Iranian taxes and Kizilbash settlements in Kartli-Kakheti. It turned out to be no less severe than it was in Ottoman times. Uprisings started immediately in Kartli and Kakheti. The Kartli uprising was led by Shanshe Eristavi along with others.

In 1737, Nadir Shah sent his brother Ibrahim Khan and an Azerbaijani army against the rebels. The leaders of the uprising left Kartli. Shanshe fled to Imereti. Here he, together with King Alexander of Imereti, launched a broad plan to free country from Persian-Ottoman slavery. Both Kartli and Imereti had high hopes for the Russian government. Shanshe left for Russia. He took with him a joint petition signed by the lords of Kartli. The ambassador of the King of Imereti Timothe also left for Russia together with Shanshe.

In the first days of March 1738, Timothe and Shanshe arrived in Moscow. Shanshe's bold political plans were not supported by the Russian government and, fearing a breakdown in relations with Iran, urged him to leave Russia immediately and return to Georgia. Timote presented a letter which was sent by King Alexander to the Anna of Russia. He also presented his compiled map of western Georgia, which also had a military purpose: It depicted in detail relief, mineral wealth, historical monuments, castles and military facilities. In the letter, King Alexander briefed the Russian emperor on the military-political situation in western Georgia, its natural resources, and finally, Alexander had seen a plan to liberate western Georgia from the Ottomans.

=== Creating a map of Imereti ===
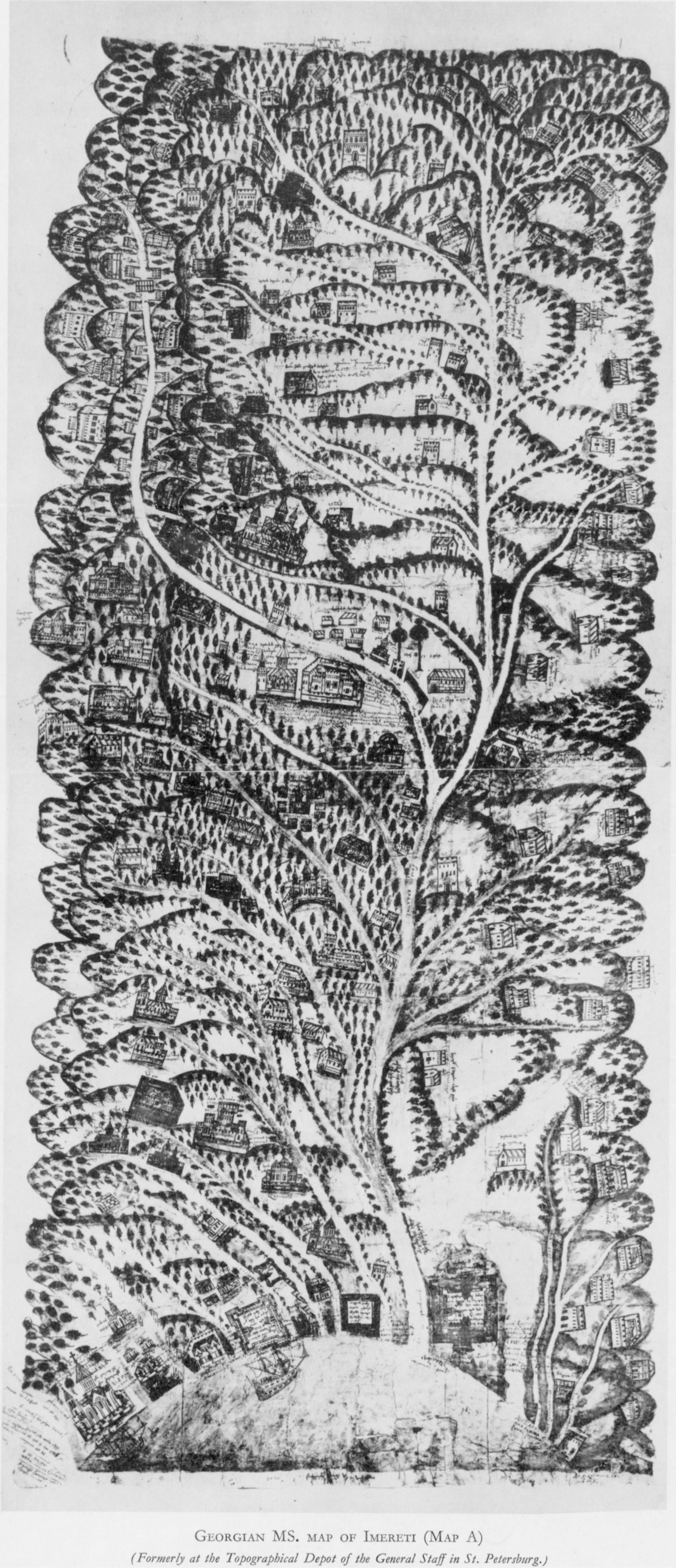
Map of Imereti compiled in 1737

A year before his departure (1737) Timote compiled a map of the well-known Likht-Imereti (i.e. western Georgia) depicting the main mountains, hydrographic network, vegetation, settlements, naval resources, mineral resources, and Monuments (especially castles and spy towers). The map compiled by Timothy reflects the geographical, geological, historical and architectural materials of western Georgia.

He paid great attention to geography. There are about 150 geographical names on the map. In addition, its map shows a wealth of minerals, including sulfur, iron, and silver ores. It also pays attention to secular buildings and temples.

Because the map was of military significance, special attention was paid to the plans of the castles and the access roads to them. He described fortresses of Sukhumi, Kutaisi, etc.

The events of the XVIII century coincided with the epoch of Timote Gabashvili's life. During this period, Ottomanism was widespread in different parts of Georgia. As a result of intensified aggression, the Ottomans managed to capture many cities and castles. From the 20s of the XVIII century they conquered Batumi, Poti, Rukhi, Sukhumi, at the same time captured and partially destroyed the castles. In 1724, the fortress in Sukhumi was further fortified by the Ottomans and it was called "Sukhumi-Kale". Despite the uprisings, the Abkhaz people were still unable to finally release the prison. Their domination here lasted a long time. The Ottomans also gained a foothold in Batumi and conquered the fortress of Batumi (also known as Losorion). The famous Gray Castle also passed into the hands of the Ottomans.

Later the Georgians (along with the Russians) managed to free the prison. Due to this situation, the rulers of western Georgia had no choice but to send an ambassador to Russia and ask for their protection.

Timote Gabashvili handed a letter to the daughter of the Russian Queen Anna, and in the letter Alexander V mentions the political situation in western Georgia.

=== Ambassador to Russia for the second time ===
In 1738 Timote Gabashvili arrived in St. Petersburg on a special secret mission. He had secret letters to hand over. But, in addition to his political mission, Timote had received other assignments from the King of Imereti.

Timote, who arrived in St. Petersburg, demanded the right to worship. Timote's delay in Russia was triggered by the prolongation of the Russo-Ottoman War. Timothy hoped that during the war he would interest the Russian government in the fate of Imereti and that Russia would demand Imereti from the Ottomans during the armistice. The Treaty of Belgrade of 1739 was signed on unfavorable terms for Russia. At the end of the war, Timote was in no hurry to return to his homeland and considered his return dangerous and asked for permission to stay in Russia in July 1739.

The Royal Chancellery granted Timote's request to allow him to stay in Russia and grant him a residence in a Moscow-level monastery, but Timote found it unbelievable to live in a Moscow-level monastery because there were migrants and workers from Vakhtang VI's colony. That is why Timote categorically refused to live in the monastery and chose a dangerous path to Georgia.

In 1740, Timothy received a reply letter to the king of Imereti, gifts from the Russian government and traveled from St. Petersburg to his homeland. Timote first arrived in Moscow, in the same year, Timothy left Moscow for Imereti with four others. He brought with him a letter from Anna of Russia which was written for the King of Imereti. Because of the dangerous road, Timote left whole crew and continued his way. On the way, Timote fell into the hands of the Circassians, where he was held captive for 6 months, and then fled at night and after a 3-day journey arrived in Khreita Mazra, from where he sent a letter to the King of Imereti by a trusted man.

So Timote, returning from Russia, returned to his diocese at the end of 1742 and ruled it until 1747. After the conquest of Imereti by the Ottomans, Timote was forced to move to Kartli because of his past relationship with Russia.

=== Trip ===
Timote Gabashvili's travels eventually lasted four years (1755–1759). The purpose of the trip was to see the places that were located in Palestine, including in Jerusalem. Timote was interested in seeing temples built by Georgians, as well as visiting other holy places.

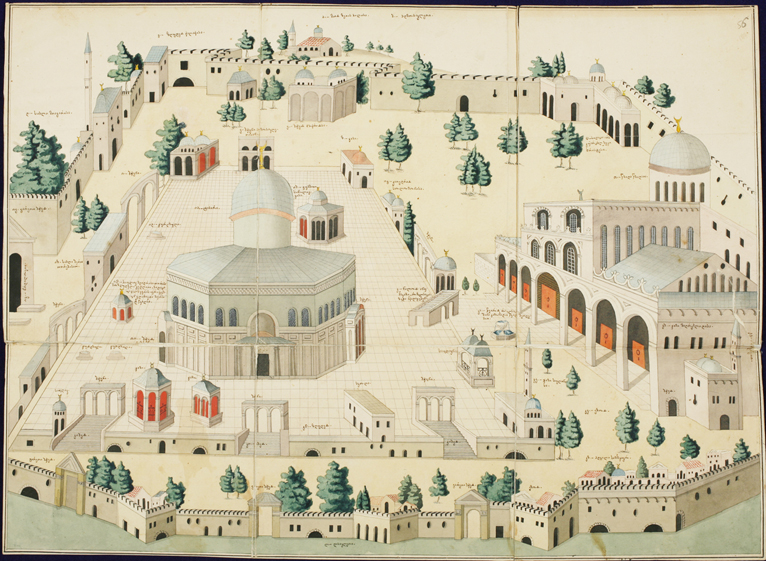
Timote Gabashvili. Jerusalem

Timote Gabashvili's journey started from Tbilisi. From there he went to Akhaltsikhe, then he reached the port city of Batumi. From Batumi he swam to the shores of Turkey in the southern part of the Black Sea, where he reached first Trabzon and then the Union. Timote then begins to move by land and digs deep into Turkish territory. After a long journey he reached the city of Konya, then through several cities reached the naval city of Izmir (Aegean Sea coast). From here, Timote sets sail again and crosses the islands in the Aegean Sea. After some distance he descends to Mount Athos. From here he moves by sea again and goes to Constantinople. From the city of Constantinople he made his way to Jerusalem and traveled many tens of kilometers (by sea). On the way he visited the towns and islands located on the shores of the Aegean Sea. Moved mainly to the south-east (i.e. in the eastern part of the Mediterranean). As a result he reached the famous Jerusalem (Palestine).

Then he moved mainly to the north and visited the coastal cities of the eastern part of the Mediterranean (Nazareth, Tyre, Sidon, Beirut, Tripoli, etc.). From the holy city of Jerusalem he also set sail and came to the island of Cyprus. He goes to the island of Rhodes. From the latter the path took most of the west and reached Corinth and Athena.

Timote then moves north (across the Aegean Sea) and enters Mount Athos (third time). And then to Constantinople. Timote sails from Constantinople by sea. He passes through several cities on the Black Sea coast, dig inland (on the territory of Turkey) and reaches Malatya, then Chaldea, Erzurum, Oltu and Akhaltsikhe. From Akhaltsikhe he goes to Kartli, where he realizes the tense situation.

Timote Gabashvili died in 1764 in the city of Astrakhan.

== "Mimosvla" ==
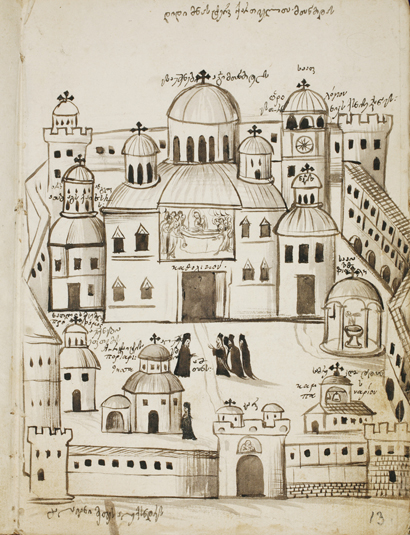
Timote Gabashvili, "Mimosvla".

Timote Gabashvili wrote an essay in the travel-memoir genre entitled "Mimosvla", where the main focus is on the description of religious sites in the area. In addition, the paper contains noteworthy geographical and ethnographic references. This work is the first to start a scientific study of Georgian cultural centers abroad, the work is also important for geographical science. It is especially interesting in terms of language. Gabashvili, as an educated scribe, was fluent in the old Georgian language and wrote his works mainly in archaic language, but the influence of the literary language of that time, characterized by grammatical forms, he could not always follow the old Georgian morphology.

Timothy described the settlements along the way: Mytilene, İzmir, Chios, Constantinople, Cyprus, Mount Athos, etc. He is also interested in the history of the origin of the geographical name, as well as why the Georgians and Spaniards were called "Iberians".

== Activities ==
Timote Gabashvili also owns the work "For the Feast of the Virgin Mary". Very interesting and noteworthy is Timothy's attitude towards philosophy, as can be seen in his writings, he greatly appreciates philosophy. His deep philosophical education can be seen in the great work he did on the printed book of John of Damascus.

According to Helen Metreveli, Timothy even used the critical-comparative method in his research of philosophical-dogmatic and historical-literary issues. According to her, if the educated high priest had more favorable living conditions, he would have been able to further develop and advance education and science in 18th century Georgia.

== Works ==
Mimosvla – Travels by Timote Gabashvili, 1759

== Literature ==
- El. Metreveli, "Mimosvla", Tbilisi, 1956.
- Metreveli El., Georgian Soviet Encyclopedia, Vol. 2, Tbilisi, 1977. – pp. 604–605.
- Gehtman G., Eminent Geographers and Travelers, Tbilisi, 1942.
- Gehtman G., Essays on the History of Geography, Tbilisi, 1955.
- Encyclopedia "Georgian Language", Tbilisi, 2008 – pp. 97–98
- Georgia: Encyclopedia: vol. I.– Tbilisi, 1997. – p. 518
- Kekelidze K., History of Georgian Literature, Vol. 1, Tbilisi, 1951.
- Burjanadze Sh., 1737 map of Likht-Imereti as the first source in the history of feudal Georgia. – "Bulletin of the Institute of Manuscripts", 1959, vol.1.
- Kiknadze, V., Archbishop of Kutaisi and Kartli Timote Gabashvili, in the magazine: "Blackberry". Periodical edition of Samtavro St. Nino Monastery, N 5 2011. – pp. 20–23.
