= Viktor Rtskhiladze =

Viktor Rtskhiladze (Georgian: ვიქტორ რცხილაძე; 10 March 1941 — 12 June 2026) was Georgian theologian and historian who was active in the human rights movement in the Soviet era. He was a co-founder of the Tbilisi Helsinki Monitoring Group, where he worked closely with future president of Georgia Zviad Gamsakhurdia. He was arrested by Soviet authorities for his activism but later released for health reasons.

Unlike Zviad Gamsakhurdia, who opposed allowing the Meskhetian people to return to Georgia, Rtskhiladze supported their right of return.

He studied at the Faculty of History of Tbilisi State University, which he graduated from in 1964. He opposed the Soviet damage of the David Gareji monastery complex, which was often damaged by stray shelled from a nearby army firing range. (Note: Sometimes spelled as David Garedzha.)
