= The Iron Theatre =

1981 novel by Otar Chiladze

- Author: Otar Chiladze
- Original title: რკინის თეატრი
- Language: Georgian
- Genre: Historical fiction
- Publication date: 1981
- Publication place: Georgia
- Media type: Print (hardback & paperback)
- Pages: 460 pages
- ISBN: 9789994054213

The Iron Theatre is a novel by Otar Chiladze, published in 1981. It revives the end of 19th and beginning of 20th century in Georgia, and explores a conflict of life and art at the edge of new millennium. The plot is a mix of historical facts, real situations and the author's fantasy. The author frequently breaks the chronological order, to empower the reader to imagine the different situations and events from the different points of view and therefore creates a complete picture of the world that he wants to represent. The novel won the Shota Rustaveli State Prize in 1983.

The Iron Theatre has been translated into several languages, including German, French, Russian, Slovak, and Estonian, among others.
