= Avelum =

Avelum (A Survey of the Current Press and a Few Love Affairs)
- Author: Otar Chiladze
- Original title: აველუმი
- Translator: Donald Rayfield
- Language: Georgian
- Genre: Magic realism, philosophical fiction
- Publisher: Garnett Press
- Publication date: 1995. 16th 2013 in English.
- Publication place: Georgia
- Media type: Print (hardback & paperback)
- Pages: 348 pages
- ISBN: 9780956468314

Avelum, Otar Chiladze's fifth novel, is the second to be translated into English.

== Plot ==
The introductory chapter of the novel explores the moral and ethical dilemmas of contemporary life. Its chronotope, Tbilisi in 1989, is deeply symbolic, representing a historical threshold between two epochs: the Soviet past and the emergence of Georgia’s national independence movement. The protagonist, Avelum, is a Georgian writer from the latter half of the twentieth century. According to the author, the name “Avelum” is of Sumerian origin and signifies “a free and full-fledged citizen.” Within the narrative, Avelum functions as a reflective observer who contemplates events and human archetypes in what the author metaphorically calls the “prison of nations,” referring to the Soviet Empire.

== Translations ==
The Russian translation of Avelum (Авелум) was rejected by every publisher in Moscow, even though Chiladze’s other novels had been bestsellers in Russia. The novel was published in English by Garnet Press in 2013 and has since been translated into several languages, including German.
