= Oleksandr Muzychko (historian) =

Ukrainian historian (born 1977)

- Олександр Євгенович Музичко
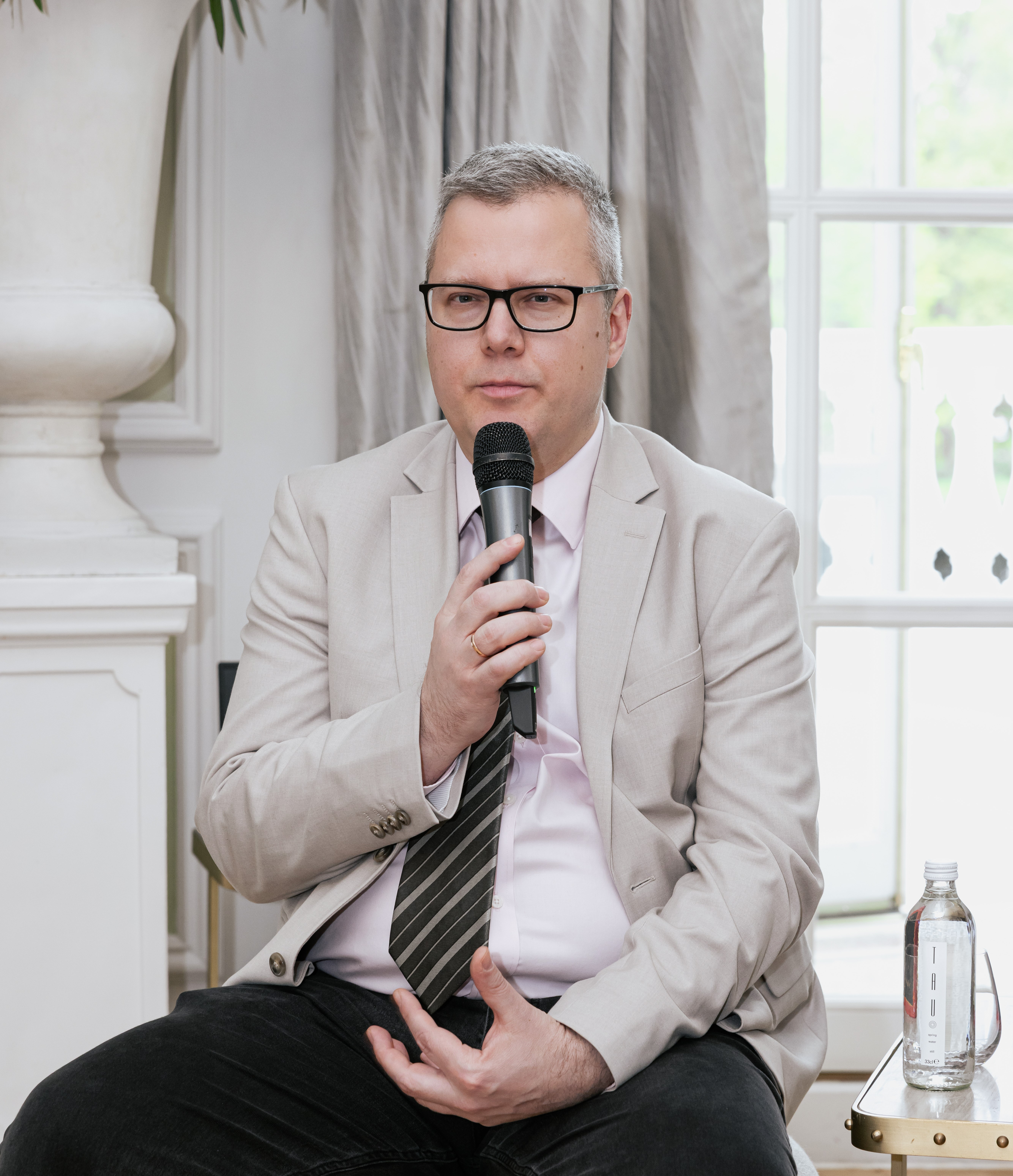
- Oleksandr Muzychko in 2026
- Born: 17 June 1977 (age 49); Odesa, Ukraine
- Education: Odesa University
- Occupations: Historian, professor of archaeology, ethnology and world history, public figure
- Known for: Georgians in Odesa
- Notable work: The Georgian Wolves. The History of the Petrovskyi Family

Oleksandr Ievhenovych Muzychko (Ukrainian: Олександр Євгенович Музичко; born 17 June 1977) is a Ukrainian historian, lecturer and public figure.

== Biography ==
He was born in Odesa.

From 1995 to 2000 he studied at the Faculty of History of Odesa Mechnykov National University. From 2000 to 2003, he was a postgraduate student.

In 2004 he defended his dissertation for the degree of Candidate of Historical Sciences (at the Oles Honchar Dnipro National University).

Since 2006 he has been a Docent at the Department of History of Ukraine, Faculty of History, Odesa Mechnykov National University. Since 2022 — professor.

In 2020 he defended his dissertation for the degree of Doctor of Historical Sciences (at the Mykhailo Hrushevsky Institute of Ukrainian Archaeography and Source Studies of the National Academy of Sciences of Ukraine).

== Academic output ==
In 2008–2010 he was a leading researcher at the Odesa branch of the National Institute for Strategic Studies, under the President of Ukraine. He also collaborated with the Shevchenko Scientific Society in Lviv. He is the author of 10 articles in Volume 1 of the Encyclopedia of Ukrainian Studies.

He co-organised 10 international and national conferences, congresses, seminars and round tables. He is a member of the editorial boards of several collected volumes devoted to the history of Southern Ukraine.

His research interests include the history of Southern Ukraine in the second half of the 19th century and the 20th century, source studies, and historiography of Southern Ukraine.

He studies little-known aspects of the Ukrainian national movement in Southern Ukraine.

He is the author of around 200 scholarly publications in Ukrainian, Russian, Georgian and English, published in journals in Ukraine (Kyiv, Lviv, Odesa, Dnipro and others), Russia (Moscow, Saint Petersburg, Novgorod, Tyumen and others), and elsewhere.

He has proposed valuable approaches to deepening the study of interethnic relations in the Odesa region, notably being the first to address the topic of Georgians in Odesa.

On 18 April 2026, the presentation of Muzychko's book The Georgian Wolves. The History of the Petrovskyi Family took place in London, with the participation of the British scholar Donald Rayfield, who wrote the foreword to the work. The study is devoted to the history of the Georgian aristocratic family of Tsitsishvili and its branch—the Nareklishvili family from the village of Zemo Kandaura in Kakheti, to which the Ukrainian philanthropist Oleksandr Petrovskyi belongs. The presentation also announced the establishment of the Ukrainian-British Platform for Caucasus Studies, in which Muzychko will participate.

== Public activity ==
Participant in approximately 100 all-Ukrainian, international, and local academic and public conferences, congresses, and forums.

Representative from Odesa at several Ukrainian World Congresses held in Kyiv and Lviv.

In 2005—2010 he was a member of the board of the Odesa branch of the All-Ukrainian Society "Prosvita" named after Taras Shevchenko, and co-organizer of its centenary anniversary celebrations.

Since 2011 he has headed the Odesa branch of the Scientific-Ideological Center named after Dmytro Dontsov.

== Awards ==
- Certificate of Appreciation from the All-Ukrainian Society "Prosvita" for contributions to the development of Ukrainian culture (2005)
- Letter of Appreciation from the Consulate General of Georgia in Odesa for a significant personal contribution to strengthening Georgian–Ukrainian relations (2011)
- Honorary Certificate from the Consulate of Georgia in Odesa for a significant personal contribution to the development of Georgian–Ukrainian cultural and academic relations and active cooperation with the Georgian diaspora and the Consulate of Georgia in Odesa (17 April 2015)

== Major works ==
- Historian Fedir Ivanovych Leontovych (1833–1910): Life and Scholarly Activity. — Odesa, 2005.
- Georgians in Odesa: History and Modernity. — Odesa, 2010. — 362 pp.
- Professor Oleksii Yakovych Shpakov (1868–1927), founder of the Odesa Institute of National Economy: Biographical Essay. — Odesa, 2011. — 224 pp.
- The Southern Axis of Unity: Nation-Building Processes in the Ukrainian Black Sea Region (late 19th — first half of the 20th century). — Odesa, 2015. — 352 pp.
- The Georgian Wolves. The History of the Petrovskyi Family. — London, 2026. — 208 pp.
