= Natlismtsemeli Monastery =

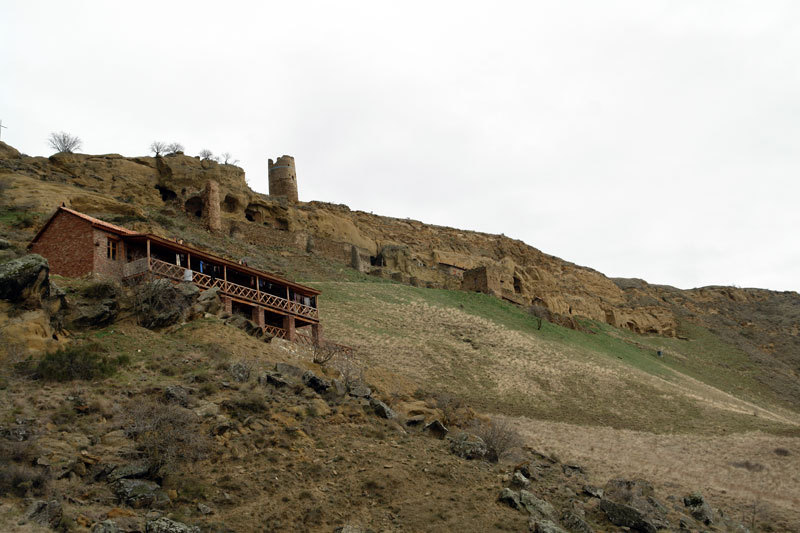
- The Natlismtsemeli Monastery

- Location within Kakheti Location within Georgia

Religion
- Affiliation: Georgian Orthodox Church

Location
- Location: (Georgia (country)) Ozurgeti Municipality, Georgia
- Interactive map of Natlismtsemeli Monastery
- Coordinates: 41°17′55″N 45°42′17″E

Architecture
- Type: Monastery, church, castle
- Style: Georgian

The Natlismtsemeli Monastery (Georgian: ნათლისმცემლის მონასტერი) also known as Saint John Monastery is a historical and architectural monument within the David Gareja monastery complex, located in the Kakheti region, in eastern Georgia.

The monastery consists of numerous cave temples and a central church. There is also a smaller church south of the main church. The interiors of the church date from the 12th century.

== History ==
The foundations of the Natlismtsemeli Monastery, located 12 km west of the David Gareja plateau, were laid by Luciane, a student of David of Gareji at the end of the 7th century, according to the church's tradition.

== Architectural features ==
The complex consists of numerous cave temples and a central church. The central church stands out for its extraordinary height. The iconography of the main church dates back to the 18th century.

There is a smaller church south of the main church. To reach that church, it is necessary to climb the rock. There is also a tall bell tower and rooms for the monks located in front of that church. The interiors date from the twelfth century.

Fragments of the painted decorations during the first half of the 12th century can be seen inside the church.

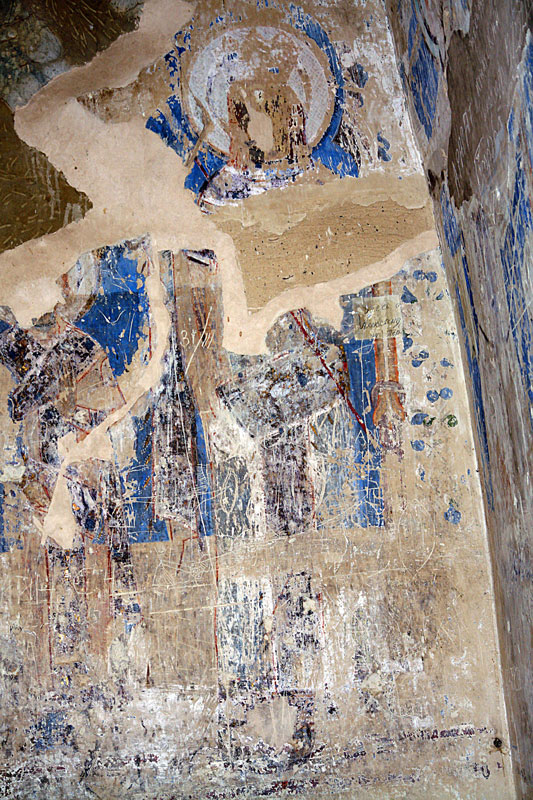
King Tamar fresco in Natlismtsemeli Monastery

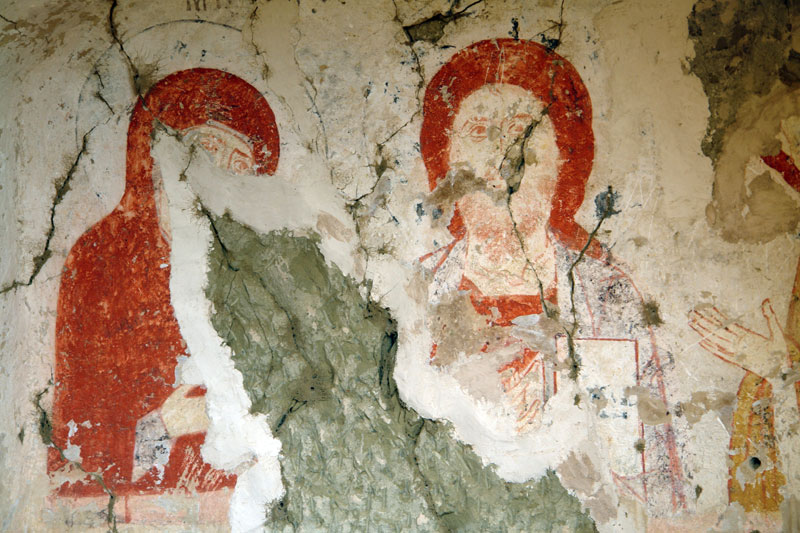
Fresco in Natlismtsemeli Monastery

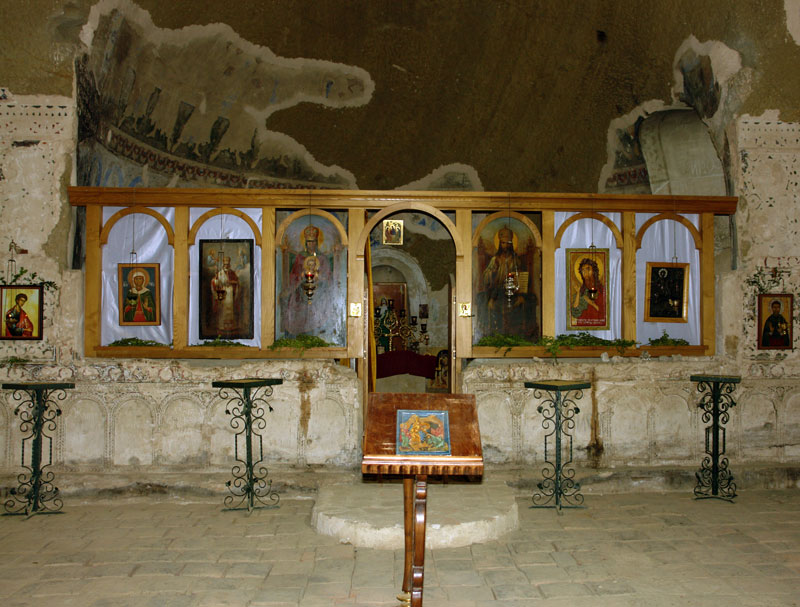
Natlismtsemeli Monastery

== See also ==
- David Gareji Lavra

== Literature ==
- ზ. თვალჭრელიძე, გარეჯის ნათლისმცემლის უდაბნო-მონასტერი, ძეგლის მეგობარი, 80, თბ., 1988
