= Stalin and His Hangmen =

Book by Donald Rayfield

Stalin and His Hangmen: An Authoritative Portrait of a Tyrant and Those Who Served Him by Donald Rayfield, and the imprinted with another subtitle: Stalin and His Hangmen: The Tyrant and Those Who Killed for Him, is a 2004 political biography by Donald Rayfield, of Joseph Stalin and his subordinates who ran the Soviet secret police: Felix Dzerzhinsky, Vyacheslav Menzhinsky, Genrikh Yagoda, Nikolai Yezhov and Lavrentiy Beria.

The books are based on recent publication by Russian authors of material from Soviet archives that started to open after the dissolution of the Soviet Union, and from some private holdings, including the Nestor Lakoba archive (acquired by the Hoover Institute). It demonstrates how Cheka and its successors were indispensable in Stalin's consolidation and maintenance of power.
