= The Basket =

2003 novel by Otar Chiladze

- Author: Otar Chiladze
- Original title: გოდორი
- Language: Georgian
- Genre: Historical fiction
- Publication date: 2003
- Publication place: Georgia
- Media type: Print (hardback & paperback)
- Pages: 352 pages
- ISBN: 9789994054183

The Basket, published in 2003, is the last novel written by Otar Chiladze before his death in 2009. A saga-novel, overtly portraying the '"Evil Empire"', its consequences and a long journey of Georgian society and culture, won the top literary award SABA for Best Novel in 2003.

== Plot ==
The story begins at the end of the 19th century, when a Russian officer seduces a Georgian shepherd’s wife. The resulting bastard, the ancestor of the novel's anti-heroes, is kept in a basket where he cannot interfere with his mother’s adultery. The shepherd avenges himself by murdering his wife and disemboweling himself but fails to kill the boy in the basket. The boy, Razhden Kasheli, later rapes his foster-mother, before disappearing to become a robber and murderer, returning to Georgia with the Red Army and a female tramp he has married; he becomes a killer for the Soviet authorities. After he is murdered by a drunken Assyrian, his son Anton acts as a GPU and NKVD killer in the Great Terror of 1937-8, shooting countless victims. Anton’s great achievement is to marry Princess Ketusi, whose father and husband he has murdered, thus initiating the process, fatal for Georgian society, of intermarrying and interbreeding Soviet killers with Georgian aristocrats and intellectuals. Anton is killed by a runaway truck in 1949, but his son Razhden 2nd takes over as an important Soviet official. Razhden’s son Anton second may not, however, be a real Kasheli, since his mother Pepe was pregnant before his parents married. Anton is a childish dreamer and, manipulated by Razhden 2nd, marries Liziko, the daughter of an unworldly writer, Elizbar. Razhden seduces Liziko; both Anton and Elizbar find out after Liziko confesses to her stepmother. More important even than these violent sexual and homicidal events are the author’s and character's reflections on the irrecoverable degradation of the country.
