= David Gareji monastery complex =

Monastery in Georgia

David Gareji
- დავით გარეჯი
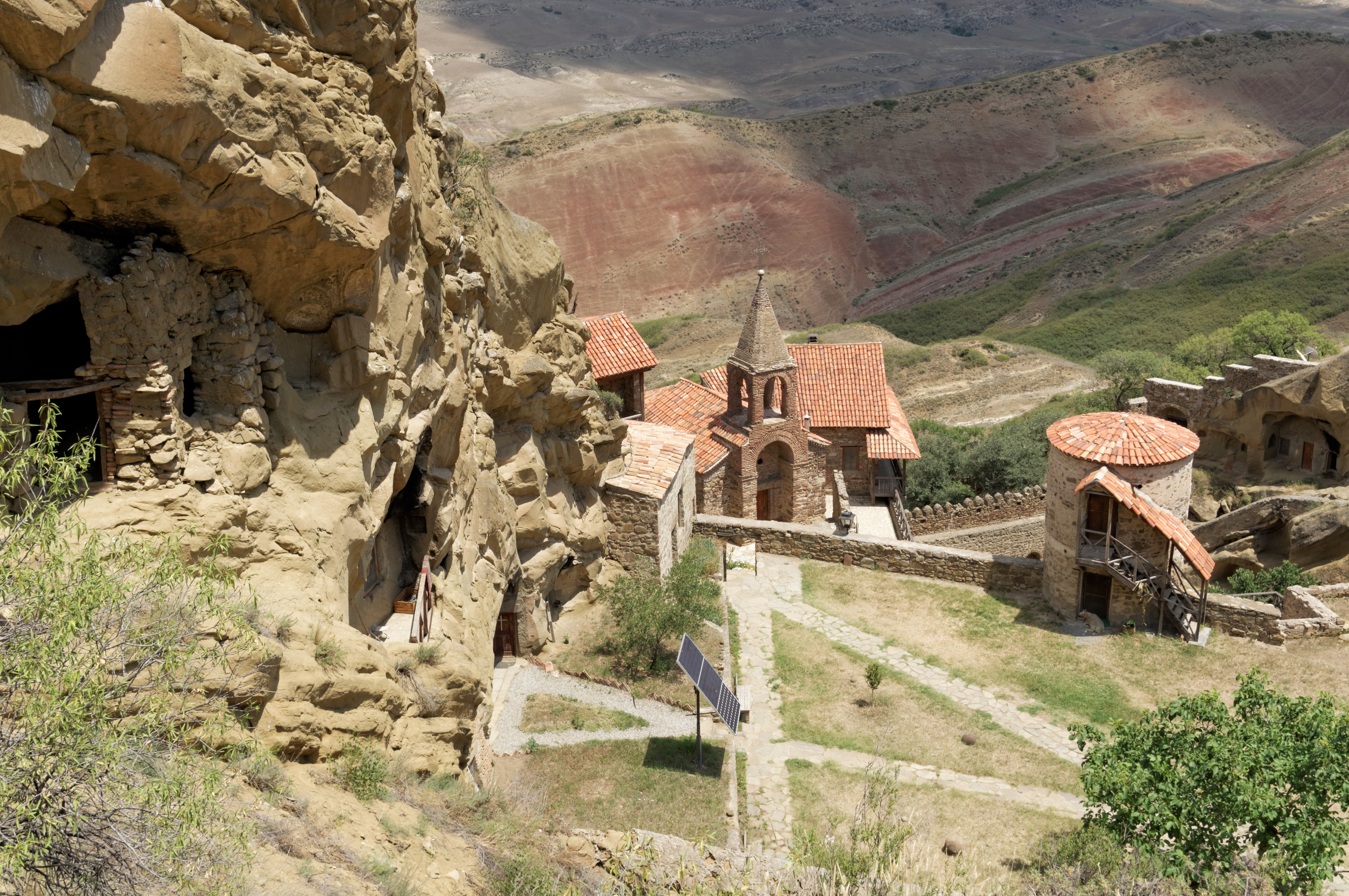
- The monastic complex of David Gareji

- Location within Georgia

Religion
- Affiliation: Georgian Orthodox Church
- Status: Active: Structures still in good condition; dispute between Georgia and Azerbaijan over territory that part of the monastic complex sits upon.

Location
- Location: Kakheti, Georgia
- Coordinates: 41.4473°N 45.3765°E

Architecture
- Type: Monastic complex
- Style: Georgian; Monastery
- Founder: St. David of Gareji
- Funded by: Saint Ilarion during the 9th century, Georgian royal and noble families
- Groundbreaking: 6th century
- Completed: 6th century, 9th century

David Gareji (Georgian: დავითგარეჯის სამონასტრო კომპლექსი) is a rock-hewn Georgian Orthodox monastery complex located in the Kakheti region of Eastern Georgia, on the half-desert slopes of Mount Gareja on the edge of the Iori Plateau, some 60–70 km southeast of Georgia's capital Tbilisi. The complex includes hundreds of cells, churches, chapels, refectories and living quarters hollowed out of the rock face.

Part of the complex of David Gareji – namely, the Bertubani Monastery – is located on the Azerbaijan–Georgia border and has become subject to a border dispute between the two countries. The area is also home to protected animal species and evidence of some of the oldest human habitations in the region.

== History ==
The complex was founded in the 6th century by David of Gareji, one of the thirteen Assyrian monks who arrived in the country at the same time. His disciples Dodo and Luciane expanded the original lavra and founded two other monasteries known as Dodo's Rka (literally, "the horn of Dodo") and Natlismtsemeli ("the Baptist"). The monastery saw further development under the guidance of the 9th-century Georgian saint Hilarion the Iberian. The convent was particularly patronized by the Georgian royal and noble families. The 12th-century Georgian king Demetre I, the author of the famous Georgian hymn Thou Art a Vineyard, even chose David Gareji as a place of his confinement after he abdicated the throne.

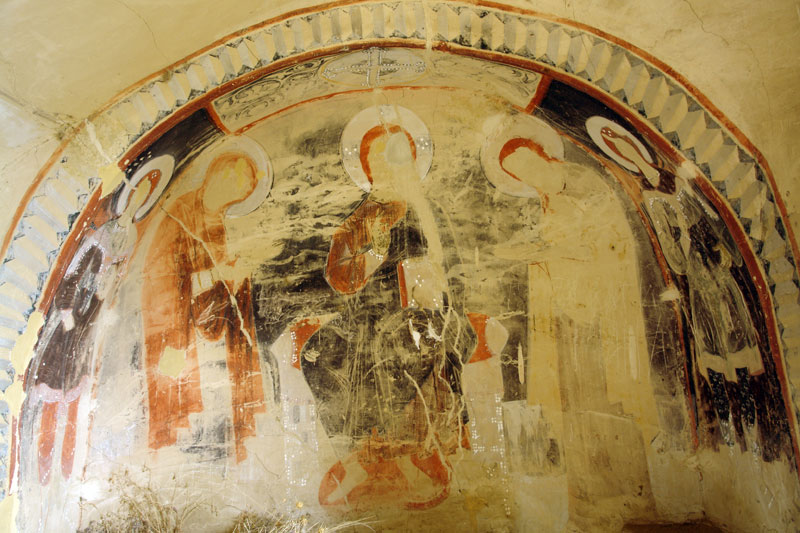
One of the monastery's surviving wall paintings.

Despite the harsh environment, the monastery remained an important centre of religious and cultural activity for many centuries; at certain periods the monasteries owned extensive agricultural lands and many villages. The renaissance of wall painting chronologically coincides with the general development of the life in the David Gareja monasteries. The high artistic skill of David Gareja wall paintings made them an indispensable part of world treasure. From the late 11th to the early 13th centuries, the economic and cultural development of David Gareja reached its highest phase, reflecting the general prosperity of the medieval Kingdom of Georgia. New monasteries Udabno, Bertubani and Chichkhituri were built, the old ones were enlarged and re-organized.

With the downfall of the Georgian monarchy, the monastery suffered a lengthy period of decline and devastation by the Mongol army (1265), but was later restored by the Georgian kings. It survived the Safavid attack of 1615, when the monks were massacred and the monastery's unique manuscripts and important works of Georgian art destroyed, to be resurrected under Onopre Machutadze, who was appointed Father Superior of David Gareja in 1690.

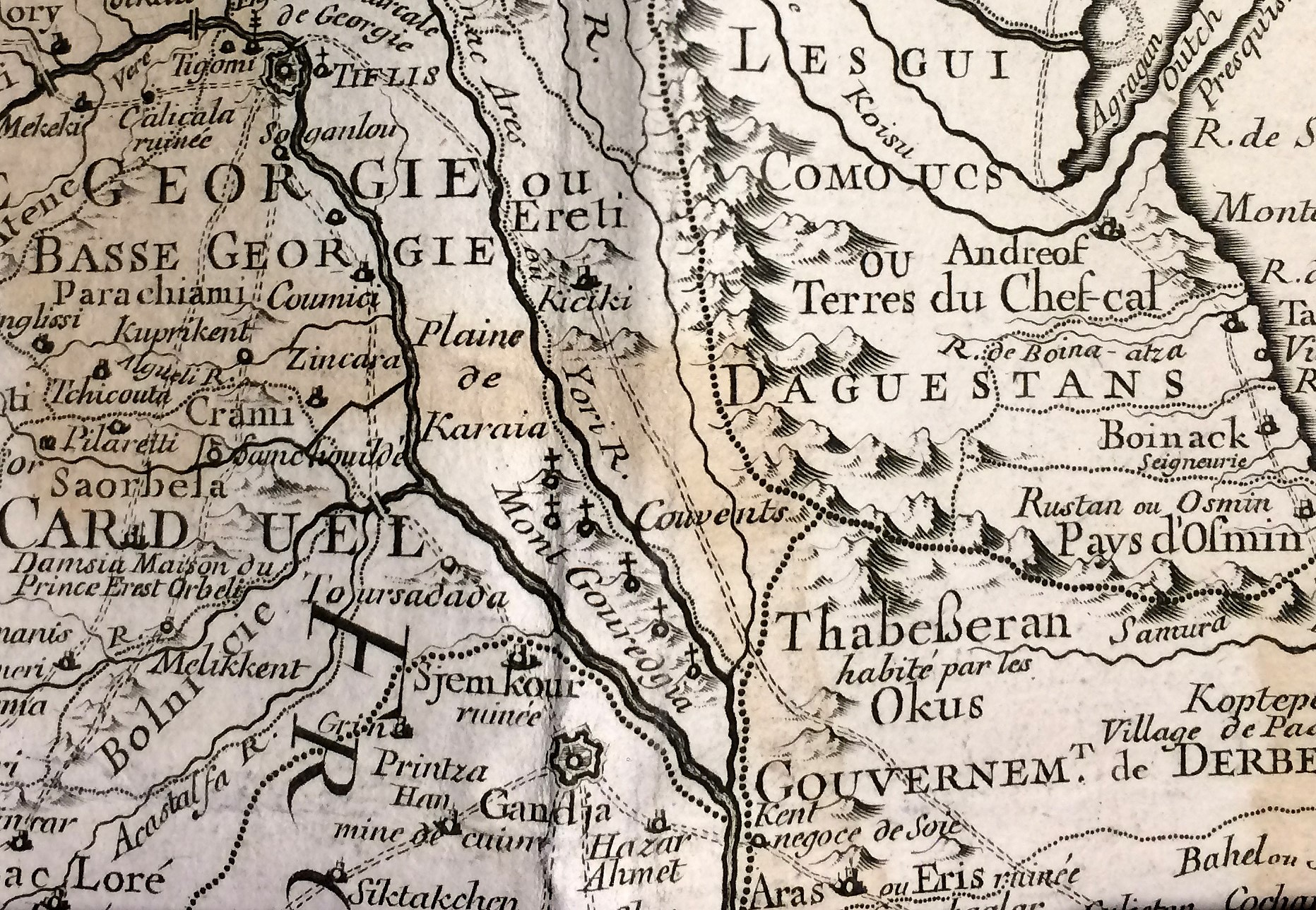
David-Gareja Mountain and Monastery (Mont Gouredgia) as depicted on 1723 map by Guillaume Delisle and Sulkhan-Saba Orbeliani

After the violent Bolshevik takeover of Georgia in 1921, the monastery was closed down and remained uninhabited. In the years of the Soviet–Afghan War, the monastery's territory was used as a training ground for the Soviet military that inflicted damage to the unique cycle of murals in the monastery. In 1987, a group of Georgian students led by the young writer Dato Turashvili launched a series of protests. Although, the Soviet defense ministry officials finally agreed to move a military firing range from the monastery, the shelling was resumed in October 1988, giving rise to generalized public outrage. After some 10,000 Georgians demonstrated in the streets of Tbilisi and a group of students launched a hunger strike at the monastery, the army base was finally removed.

Locations of Monasteries founded by the thirteen Assyrian fathers in the mid 6th century Iberia. One of them is Gareja

After the restoration of Georgia's independence in 1991, the monastery life in David Gareja was revived. However, in 1996, the Georgian defense ministry resumed military exercises in the area, leading to renewed public protests. In May 1997, hundreds of Georgian NGO activists set up their tents in the middle of the army's firing range and blocked the military maneuvers. The army officials finally bowed to the public pressure and the exercises were banned.

The monastery remains active today and serves as a popular destination of tourism and pilgrimage.

== Georgian monastery complex ==
Because the complex is partially located on the territory of Azerbaijan, it has become subject to a border dispute between Georgia and Azerbaijan, with ongoing talks since 1991. Georgian monks at the monastery say that "they see the dispute as the result of Soviet scheming to undermine relations between Christian Georgians and Muslim Azerbaijanis". Giorgi Manjgaladze, Georgia's deputy foreign minister proposed that Georgia would be willing to exchange other territory for the remainder of David Gareja because of its historical and cultural significance to the Georgians. Baku disapproves of this land swap because of David Gareja's strategic military importance. Azerbaijan's deputy foreign minister Khalaf Khalafov stated that "There is no room for territorial exchange. There are no negotiations over this issue". In April 2007, Khalafov told a press conference in that it was "out of the question" for Georgia to "give up its claims to the borderlands" including David Gareja. He then made a controversial statement that the monastery "was home to the Caucasian Albanians, who are believed to have been the earliest inhabitants of Azerbaijan". This prompted a response from Georgian foreign minister Gela Bezhuashvili. he told reporters in Tbilisi: "It is absolutely unclear to me why my colleague made these remarks. His history lessons are absolutely incomprehensible. He should read up on world history."

The Albanian theory is also supported by some Azerbaijani historians who are strongly opposed to transferring any part of their territory to Georgia. Ismail Umudlu, an Azerbaijani journalist and historian, stated: "The monastery was inside Georgia only in the 12th century. Both before and after this period, the area was part of a state to which Azerbaijan is a successor." Georgian art historian Dimitri Tumanishvili dismissed this claim and stated that the complex "is covered in the work of Georgian masters. ... There are Georgian inscriptions everywhere dating back to the sixth century. There are no traces of another culture there. After that, I don't think you need any further proof." Zaza Datunashvili, a monk from David Gareja, said: "The idea that this monastery was founded by the Caucasus Albanians is simply absurd. You might as well say that Georgians built the Great Wall of China."

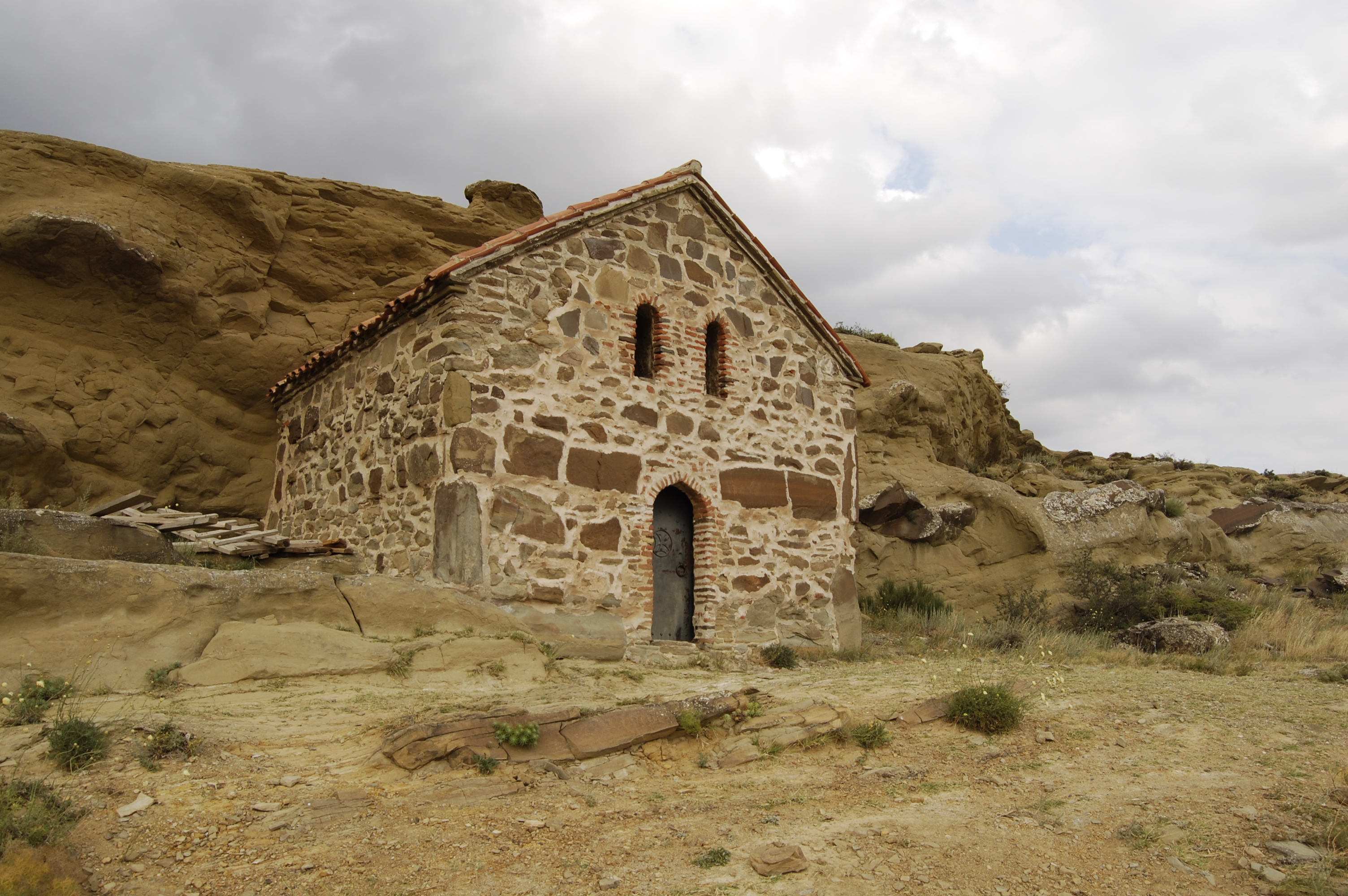
A part of the complex on the Georgian-Azerbaijan dispute Borderline. St. Georgian martyr monks church

Georgian President Mikheil Saakashvili downplayed the dispute and said that "it can be resolved through friendly dialogue". However, Giga Bukia, a member of the Georgian parliament with the Rightist Opposition stated that "Georgians will never, under any circumstances, give up this territory" and also accused the government of softening its position on the complex in order to secure financial aid from Azerbaijan: "Azerbaijan has absolutely no historical rights to this land. And what is this talk of it being a strategic location? Are they planning to go to war with Georgia?"

Azerbaijani officials confirmed that Azerbaijan "is open to implementation of joint projects with Georgia for the restoration of the complex". However, official suggestions that the complex could be a "shared tourist zone" have sparked indignation from the Georgian public. Catholicos-Patriarch of All Georgia Ilia II said that "the monastery was a holy shrine that should lie entirely on Georgian soil". A number of fresh rounds of "border delimitation" talks have been conducted between Azerbaijani and Georgian authorities (in Tbilisi and then in Baku).

== State Historical and Cultural Reserve "Keshikcidag" ==
The part of David Gareji monastery complex that is located in Azerbaijan has a historical and cultural reserve status according to the presidential order No.2563 dated December 19, 2007, and named as State Historical and Cultural Reserve "Keshikcidag". There are 70 caves, 2 temples, one fortress, a sacred place, approximately 100 grave reminds kurgan, 23 water wells, 14 food stores, and about 30 shelters. One of the highest altitudes in the State Historical and Cultural Reserve "Keshikcidag" was named "Ilham Aliyev peak" in honor of the President of Azerbaijan. The reserve covers approximately 25 km^{2} (9.7 sq mi) stretches Azerbaijani-Georgian border in Jeyranchol, Gatardagh chain, 15 km (9.3 mi) north-east from Jandar lake, on the mountainous area that are 750–950 m (2,460–3,120 ft) above sea level. The reserve consists of natural and artificial caves, castle and monastery carved in Early and Middle Ages. According to the Azerbaijani side, Keshikchi gala (Guardian castle) was built by the native population of Caucasus Albania in the 5th century AD and meant "guardian". Therefore, it is considered as similar to the other castles in Azerbaijani territory because of its architectural structure characteristics. It was discovered that the Keshikchi gala in the area was originally built for defense purposes in the Middle Ages, where it was inhabited by the ancient Caucasian Albanian. The natural caves date back in the early stages and the artificial caves are considered to be found between in 9th and 15th centuries.

== Delimitation process ==
The delimitation and demarcation process between Azerbaijan and Georgia affects the David Gareji Monastery Complex. As the complex lies along the borders, it causes a debate between the two nations. On May 14, 2019, Deputy Foreign Minister of Azerbaijan Khalaf Khalafov and Deputy Foreign Minister of Georgia Lasha Darsaliya held a meeting in Baku based on the delimitation of the state border between the two countries. Following the independence of the two countries, relevant state commissions on delimitation and demarcation of the state border between Azerbaijan and Georgia were established and 11 meetings of the Commission were held so far. Within the framework of this process, an agreement was reached on the delimitation of the most part of the Azerbaijani-Georgian border (in total 480 km (300 mi)). Currently, a 166 km (103 mi) section including the area that the monastery complex located is the main objective for both countries. Because of strong economic and cultural ties between Azerbaijan and Georgia, both countries have peaceful intentions in the determination of borders. During a meeting held in Azerbaijan, on February 27, 2019 between President of Georgia, Salome Zurabishvili and the President of Azerbaijan, Ilham Aliyev, both sides clearly emphasized consensus on delimitation process to be done by considering the existing bonds between the two countries.

== Gallery ==
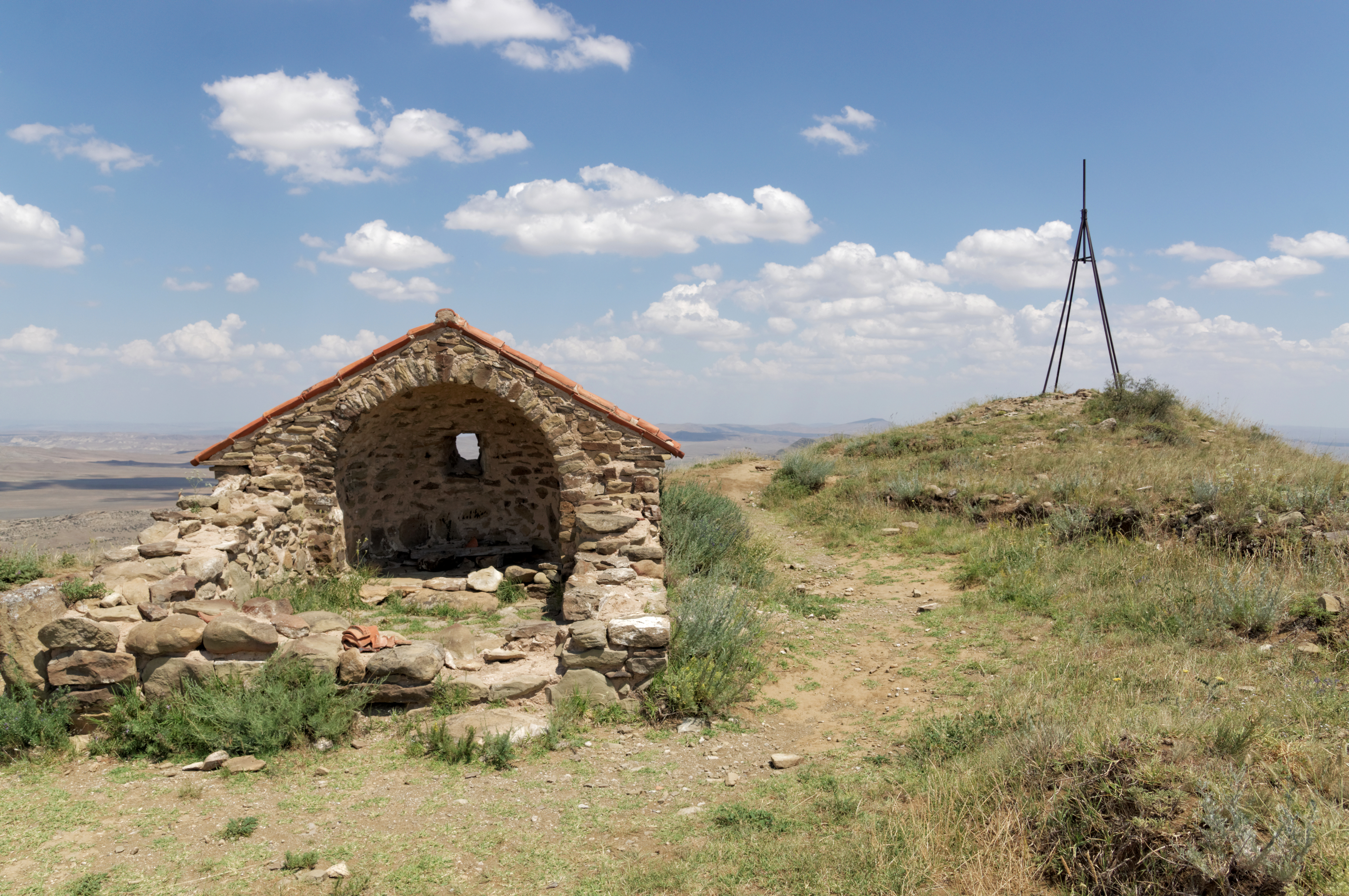
Mount Gareja

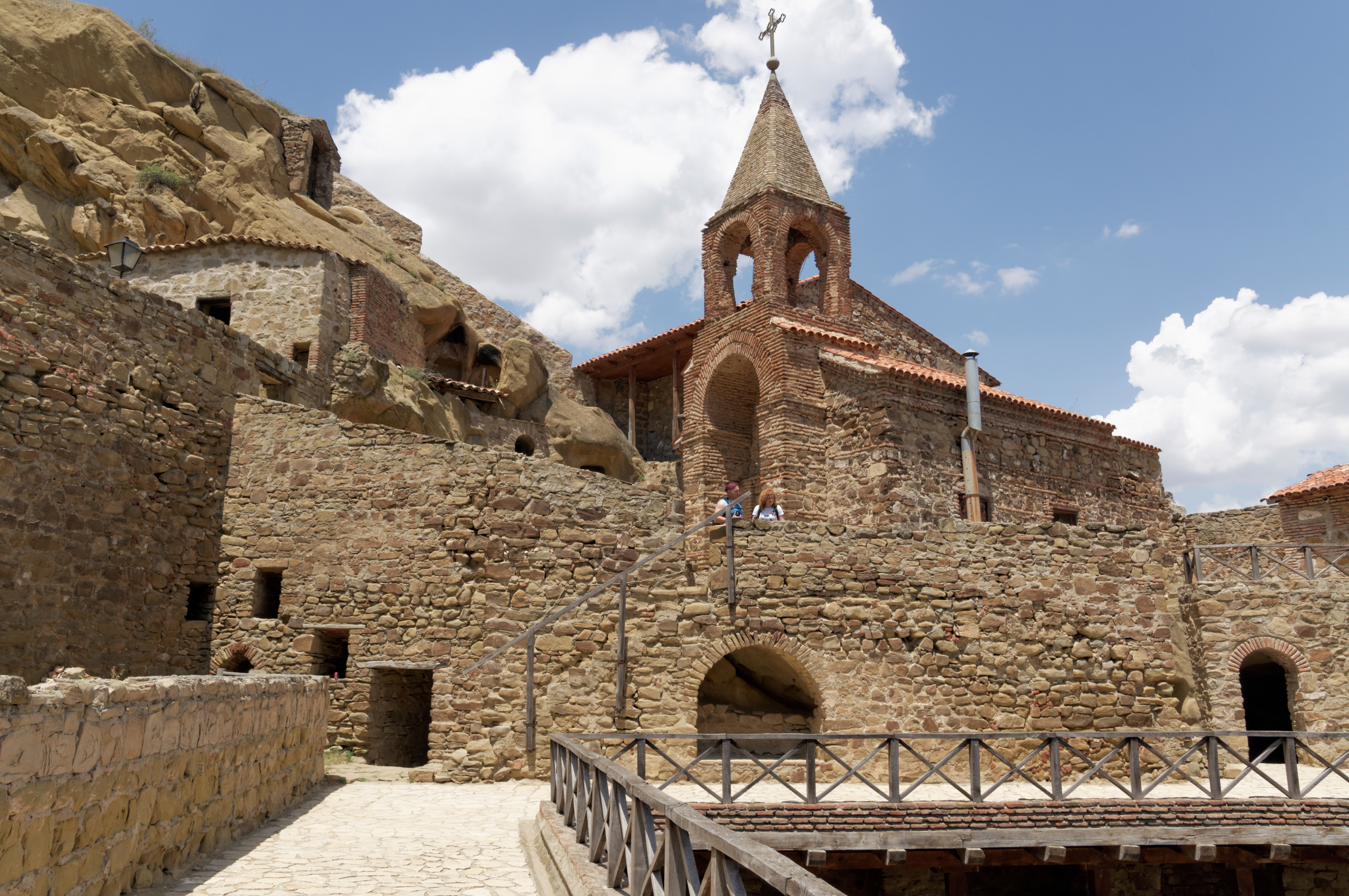
David Gareji Lavra

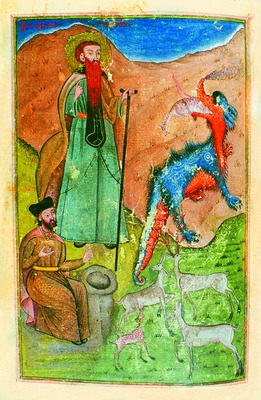
St. David of Gareja, an 18th-century miniature

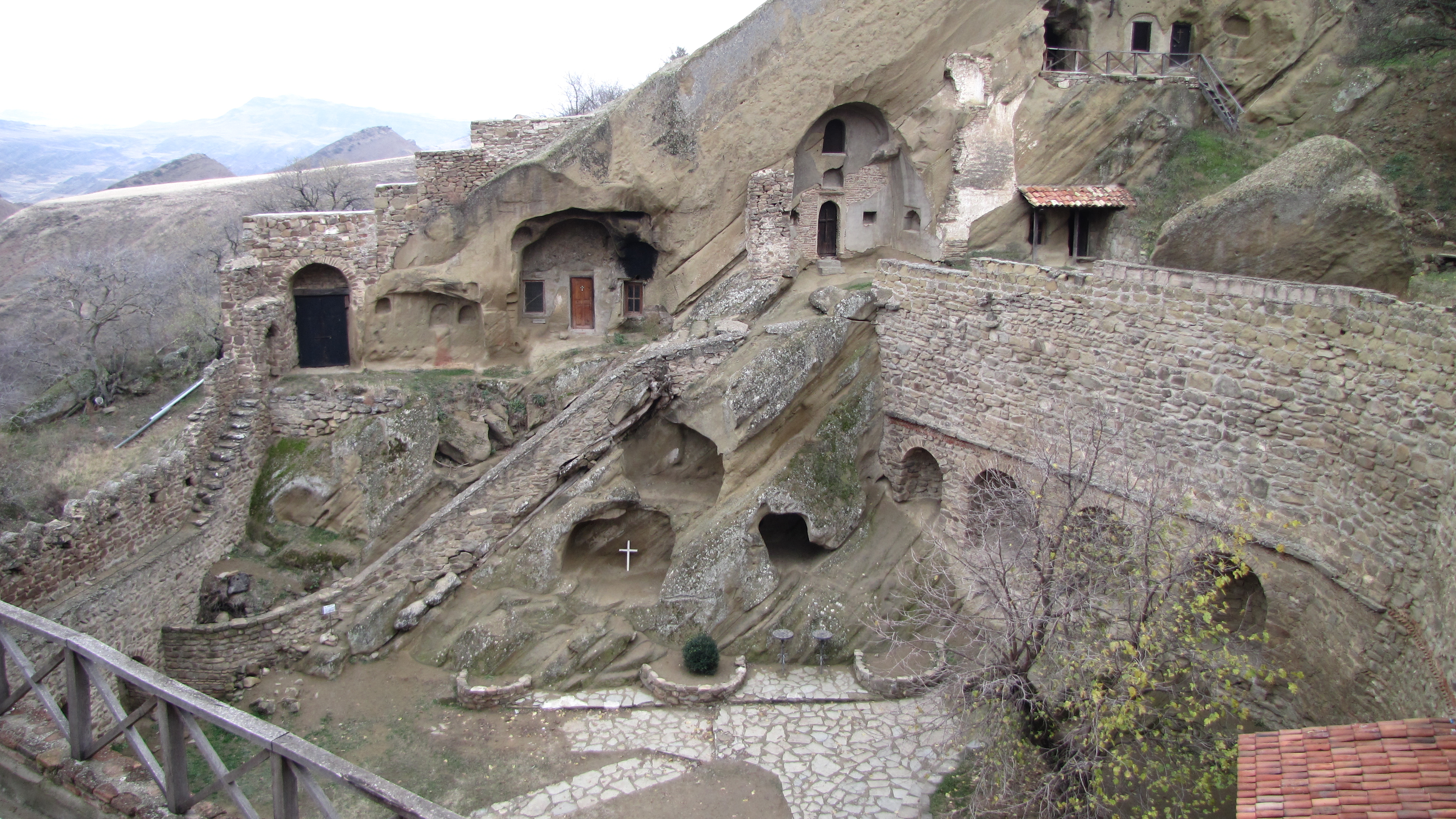
David Gareji monastery and caves 21

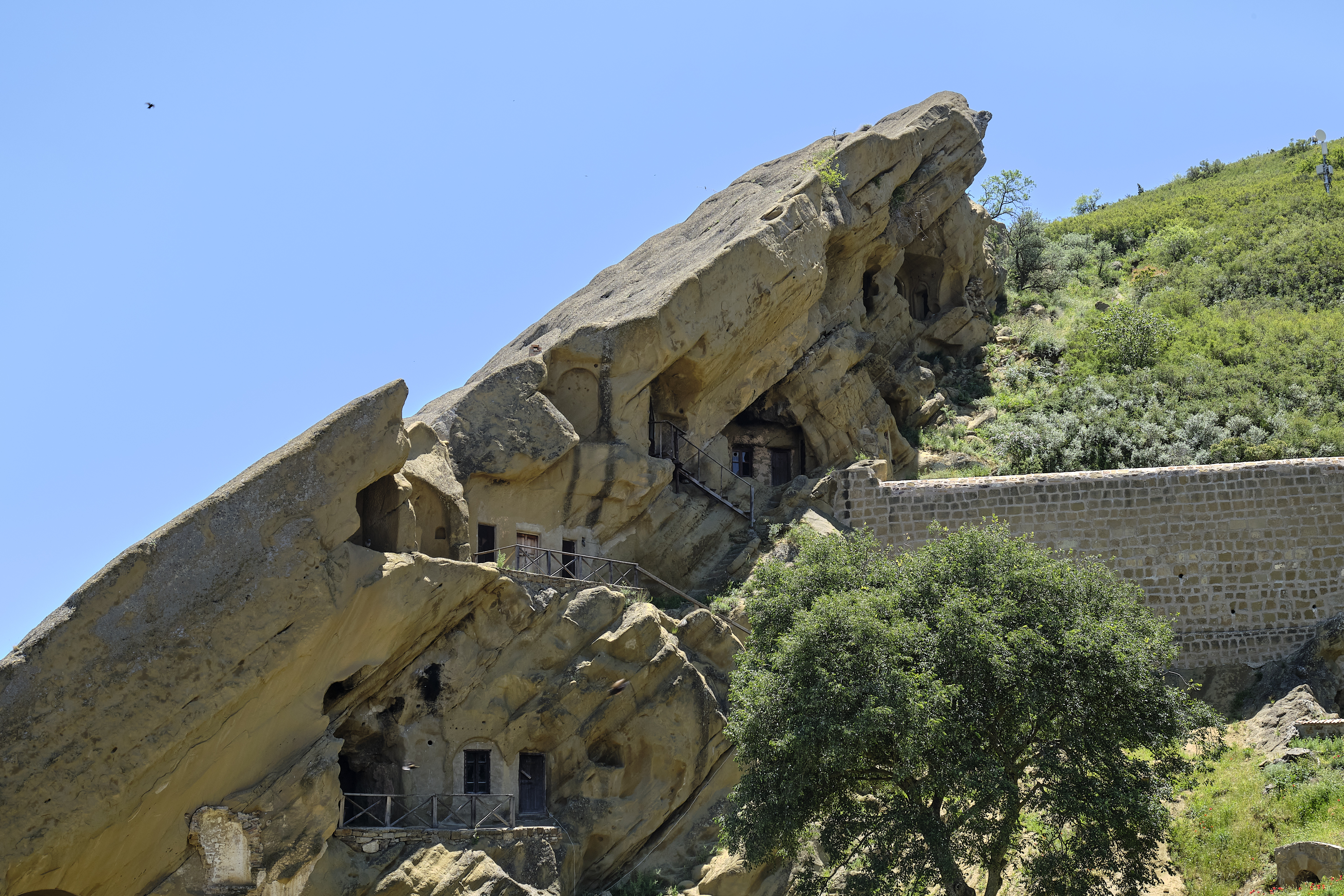
Caves at the David Gareji monastery

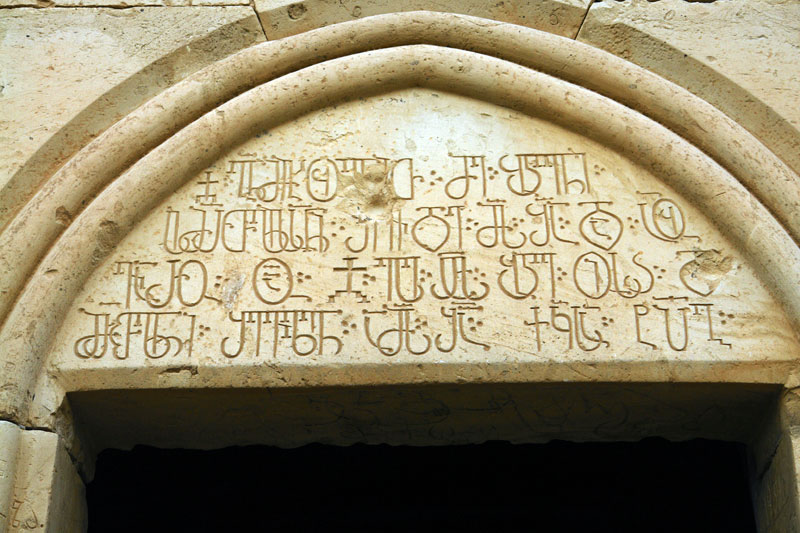
Georgian Asomtavruli inscriptions at the entrance of S. David's lavra

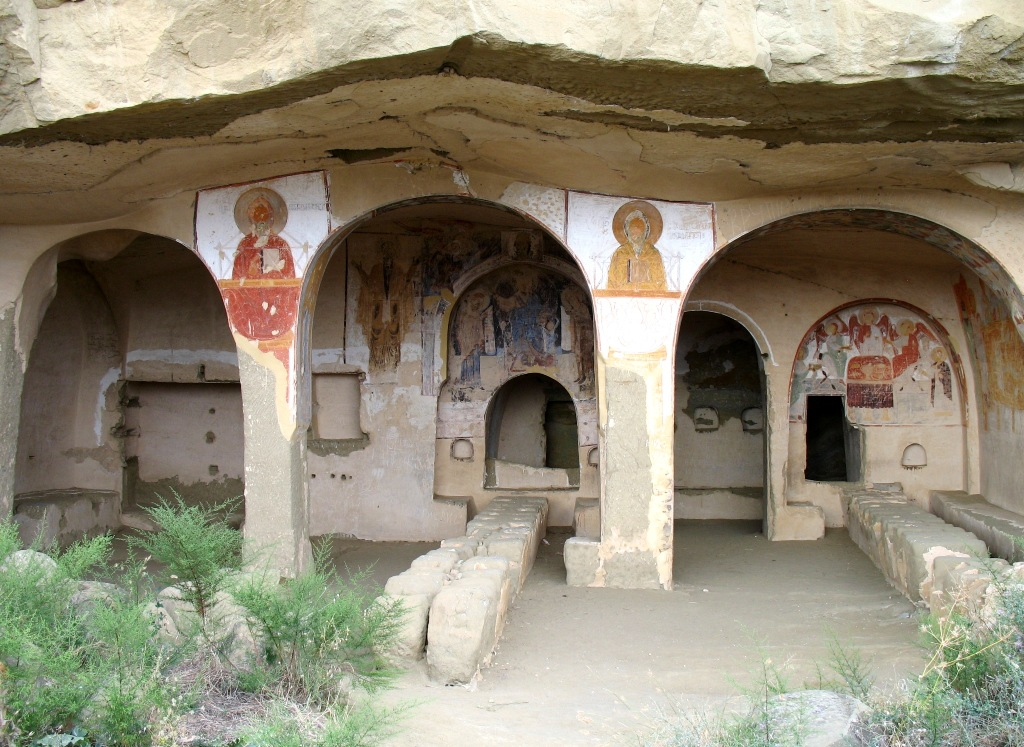
Refectory
