= Donald Rayfield =

British academic and translator (born 1942)

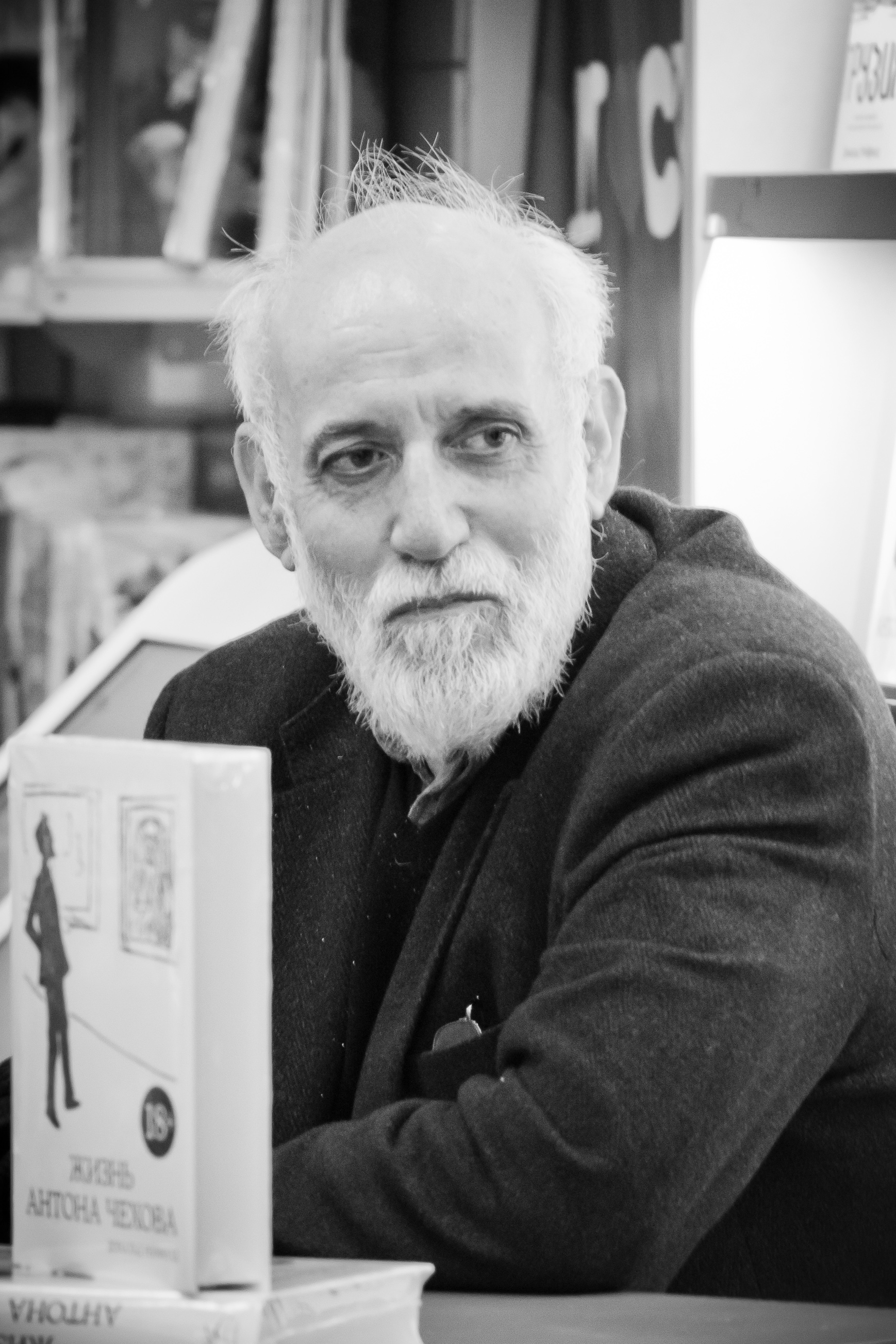
- Born: 12 February 1942 (age 84); Oxford, United Kingdom
- Occupations: Professor of Georgian and Russian languages, Translator
- Known for: Stalin and His Hangmen
- Notable work: Kvachi Kvachantiradze; A Man Was Going Down the Road; The Literature of Georgia: A History; A Comprehensive Georgian-English Dictionary; Edge of Empires: A History of Georgia

Patrick Donald Rayfield OBE (born 12 February 1942) is an English academic and Emeritus Professor of Russian and Georgian at Queen Mary University of London. He is an author of books about Russian and Georgian literature, history of Georgia, and about Joseph Stalin and his secret police. He is also a series editor for books about Russian writers and intelligentsia. He has translated Georgian, Russian and Uzbek poets and prose writers.

In March 2025, Donald Rayfield declined an award from the Writers' House of Georgia. Speaking at an event in London, he stated that he could not accept any gift associated with the Georgian Dream party.

In 2026, he wrote the foreword to The Georgian Wolves: The History of the Petrovskyi Family, a book by the Ukrainian historian Oleksandr Muzychko. He also took part in the book's presentation in London on 18 April 2026, during which the establishment of the Ukrainian-British Academic Platform for Caucasus Studies was announced, with Rayfield taking part in its activities.

== Bibliography ==
- Dream of Lhasa: The Life of Nikolay Przhevalsky (1976)
- The Cherry Orchard: Catastrophe and Comedy (1994) ISBN 0-8057-4451-7
- Anton Chekhov: A Life (1997) ISBN 0-00-255503-4 (and several other reprints)
- Understanding Chekhov: A Critical Study of Chekhov's Prose and Drama (1999)
- The Garnett Book of Russian Verse (2000)
- The Literature of Georgia: A History (2000)
- Stalin and His Hangmen (2004) ISBN 0-375-50632-2 (and several other reprints)
- A Comprehensive Georgian-English Dictionary (2006)
- Chekhov's Uncle Vanya and the Wood Demon (2007)
- Edge of Empires: A History of Georgia (2012)
- ‘A Seditious and Sinister Tribe’: The Crimean Tatars and Their Khanate (Reaktion Books, 2024)

== Translations from Russian ==
- Dead Souls, translation of Gogol's 1842 novel (Garnett Press, 2008; New York Review Books, 2012)
- Kolyma Stories (first half of the complete set), translation of Varlam Shalamov's stories (New York Review Books, 2018)
- Sketches of the Criminal World: Further Kolyma Stories (second half of the complete set), translation of Varlam Shalamov's stories (New York Review Books, 2020)
- Lady Macbeth of Mtsensk: Selected Stories of Nikolai Leskov (New York Review Books, 2020)

== Translations from Georgian ==
- A Man Was Going Down the Road - Otar Chiladze (2012) ISBN 0956468306
- Avelum - Otar Chiladze (2013) ASIN B00DG9QLZ0
- The Story of My Life - Akaki Tsereteli (2013) ASIN B00COQSC7Q
- Kvachi Kvachantiradze - Mikheil Javakhishvili (2015) ISBN 1564788792
- Unveiling Vazha Pshavela - Vazha Pshavela, Ana Kordzaia-Samadashvili, edited by Andro Semeiko (2019) ISBN 9780956468345

== Translations from Uzbek ==
- The Devils' Dance - Hamid Ismailov (2018) - with poetry translated by John Farndon
- Manaschi - Hamid Ismailov (2021)
