= David Gareji Lavra =

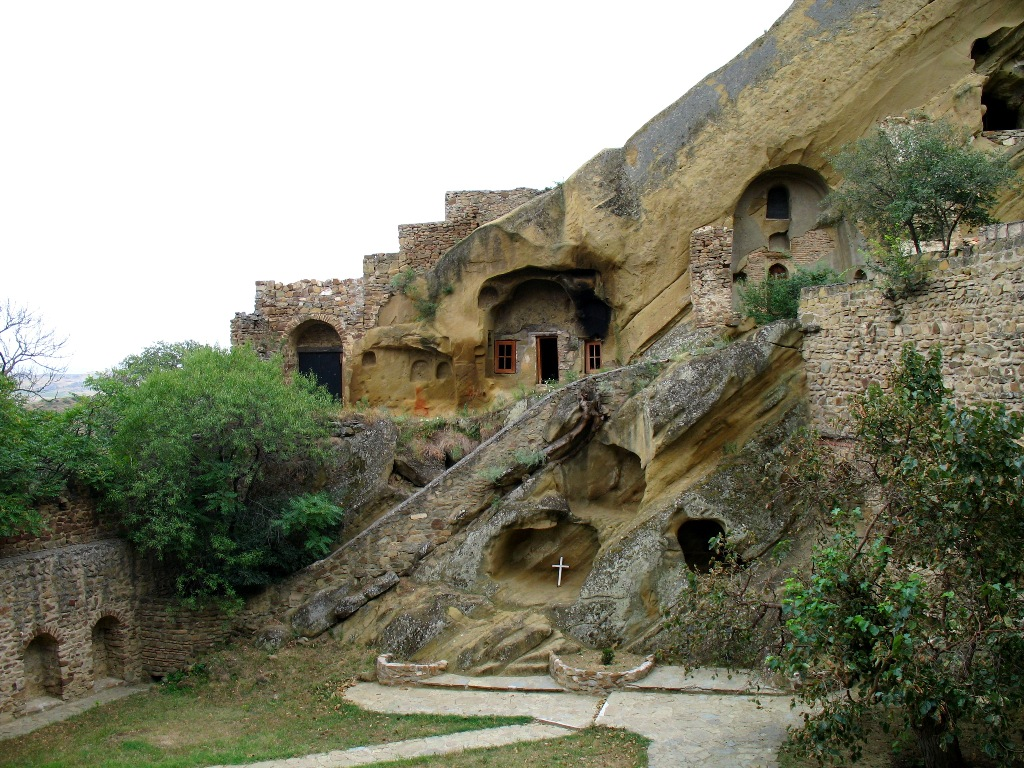

The Lavra of David (Georgian: დავითის ლავრა, romanized: davitis lavra) or David Gareji Lavra is a historical and architectural monument within the David Gareji monastery complex. It was built during the first half of the 6th century under the guidance of David of Gareji.

== Architecture ==
The monastery includes several buildings dating from the VI-XVIII centuries, intended for the use of churches, monks and visitors. It is surrounded by defensive walls with rounded towers.

In the center, there is an old church with a bell tower over the entrance.

It is located in a mountainous area rich in caves. In the monastery, a system has been created to collect, filter and use rainwater from the mountain. Water drips and accumulates continuously in one of the caves that enter the complex. According to legend, this cave is called "The Tear of David."

The largest and most important building in the complex is the Church of the Apostle John. Located in the heart of the complex, this church was built in the 12th century with red tiles.

The north wall of the church, restored during the 18th century, is decorated with wall paintings depicting different eras of David Gareji's life.

== Leaders of the monastery ==
- 6th century - David Gareji
- 1881 - Archimandrite Grigory Dadiani

== Literature ==
- Sagaradze Sh., Georgian Soviet Encyclopedia, Vol. 3, p. 340, Tb., 1978.
- Chubinashvili G.N., Пещерные монастыри David-Гарежи, Тб., 1948. (Russian)
