= The Literature of Georgia: A History =

1994 book by Donald Rayfield

- Author: Donald Rayfield
- Publication date: 1994

The Literature of Georgia: A History by Donald Rayfield, professor of Russian and Georgian at the University of London, is the first and the most comprehensive study of the literature of Georgia that has been published in English. The work deals with Georgia's 1,500-year literary tradition from 5th-century hagiographic writings to 20th-century poetry and prose. The book explores the diverse influences which have affected the Georgian literature – from Greek and Persian to Russian and modern European, and the folklore of the Caucasus, and also includes translations of several pieces of the Georgian poetry.

Part V, dealing with the Soviet and post-Soviet periods, Rayfield discusses the fate of Georgia's intellectuals during Joseph Stalin's Great Purge, describing it as a "holocaust". Rayfield was one of the first researchers to gain access to declassified Soviet archives describing the 1937 show trials of Georgian writers organized by Lavrentiy Beria; these documents are referenced throughout Part V.

The book was first published in 1994 and earned praise from several literary authorities. The second and revised edition appeared in 2000; the third, revised again and expanded, was released in 2010.
