= Otar Chiladze =

Georgian writer

- ოთარ ჭილაძე
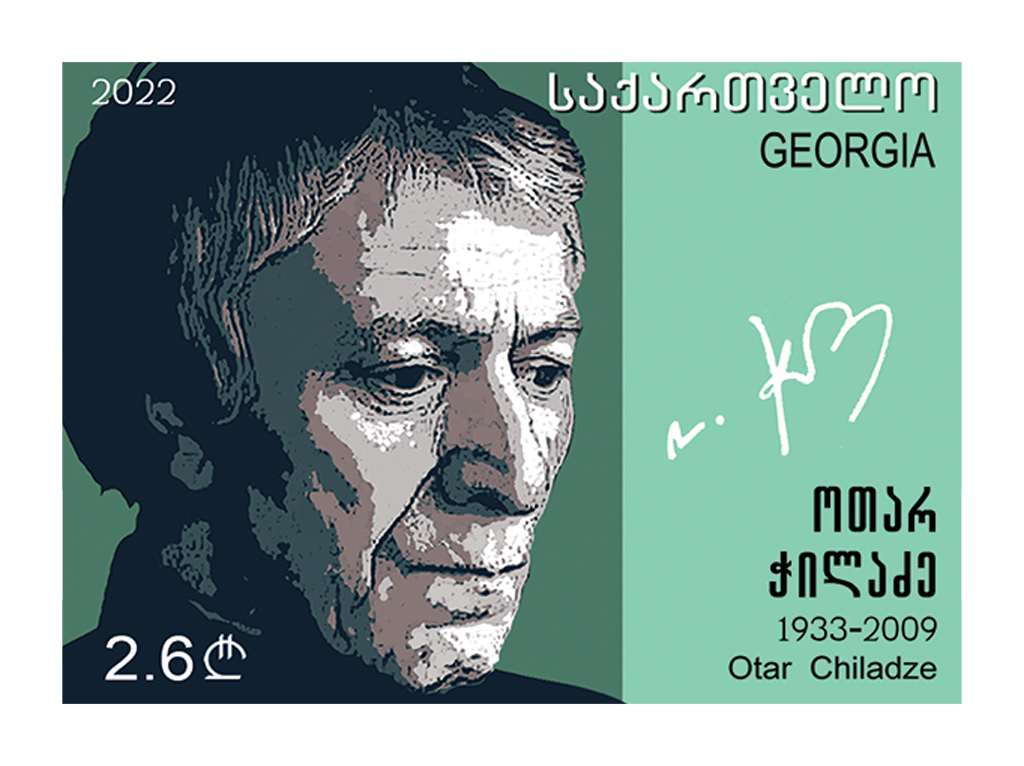
- Chiladze on a 2022 stamp of Georgia
- Born: 20 March 1933; Sighnaghi, Georgian SSR, Soviet Union
- Died: 1 October 2009 (aged 76); Tbilisi, Georgia
- Occupations: Writer, novelist, poet
- Relatives: Tamaz Chiladze (brother)
- Writing career
- Language: Georgian
- Genres: Historical fiction, Poetry, Philosophical fiction
- Subjects: History, Bible
- Notable works: A Man Was Going Down the Road; Everyone That Findeth Me; The Iron Theatre; Avelum
- Literary movement: Magic realism, Postmodernism

Otar Chiladze (Georgian: ოთარ ჭილაძე; March 20, 1933 — October 1, 2009) was a Georgian writer who played a prominent role in the resurrection of Georgian prose in the post-Joseph Stalin era. His novels characteristically fuse Sumerian and Hellenic mythology with the predicaments of a modern Georgian intellectual.

== Life and work ==
Chiladze was born in Sighnaghi, a town in Kakheti, the easternmost province of then-Soviet Georgia. He graduated from the Tbilisi State University with a degree in journalism in 1956. His works, primary poetry, first appeared in the 1950s. At the same time, Chiladze engaged in literary journalism, working for leading magazines in Tbilisi. He gained popularity with his series of lengthy, atmospheric novels, such as A Man Was Going Down the Road (1972–3), Everyone That Findeth Me (1976), Avelum (1995), and others. He was a chief editor of the literary magazine Mnatobi since 1997. Chiladze also published several collections of poems and plays. He was awarded the Shota Rustaveli Prize in 1983 and the State Prize of Georgia in 1993.

Chiladze died after a long illness in October 2009 and was buried at the Mtatsminda Pantheon in Tbilisi, where some of the most prominent writers, artists, scholars, and national heroes of Georgia are buried. His elder brother Tamaz Chiladze was also a writer.

== Reception and legacy ==
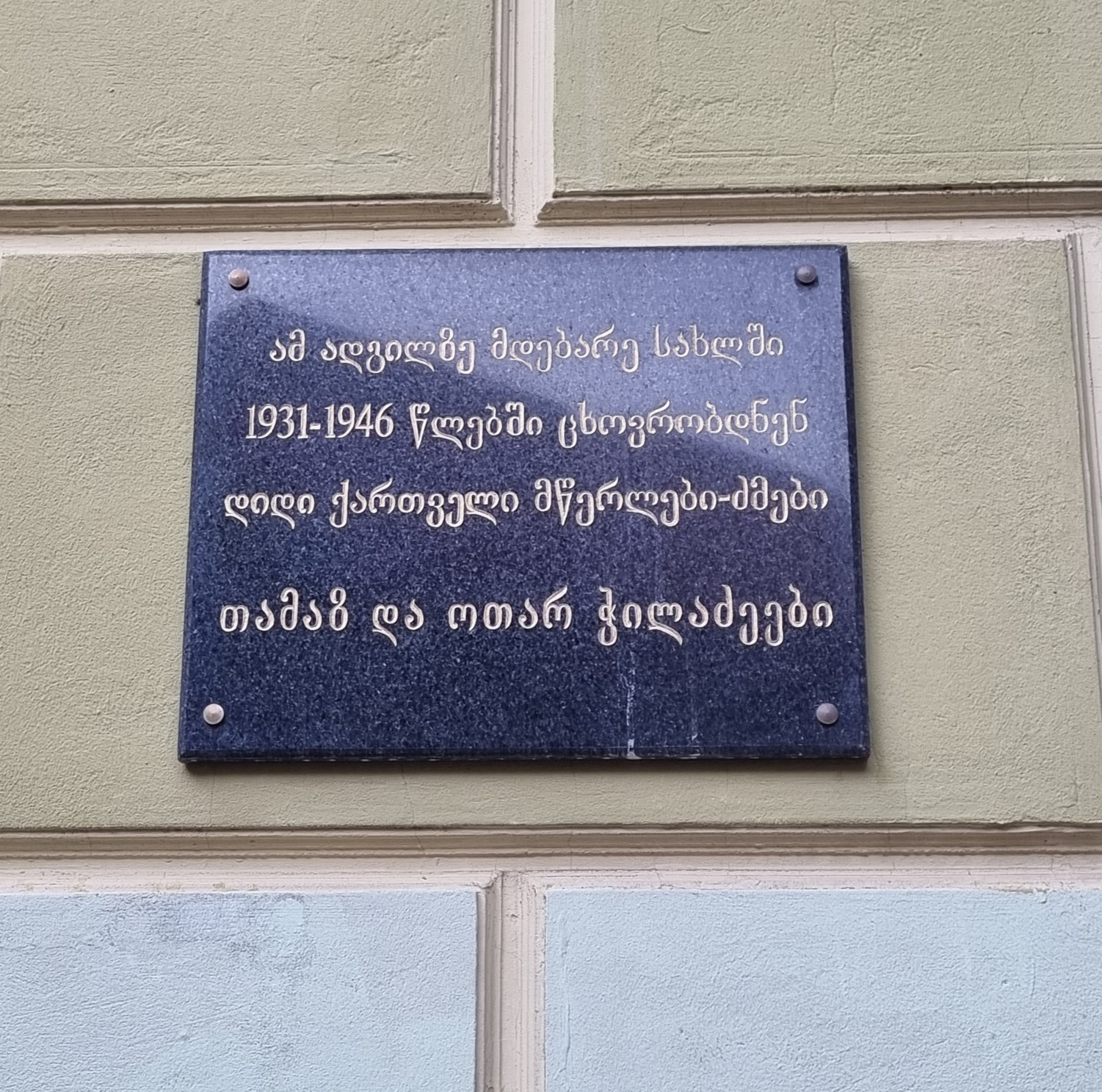
Tamaz and Otar Chiladze memorial plaque in Batumi

Otar Chiladze who became a Georgian classic author during his lifetime was awarded some Highest State Prizes of Georgia and in 1998 was nominated for the Nobel Prize along with five other writers. His works have been translated into English, Russian, Armenian, Estonian, Serbian, French, Danish, German, Bulgarian, Hungarian, Czech, Slovak and Spanish. Otar Chiladze's novels A Man Was Going Down the Road and Avelum, translated by Donald Rayfield, were published in the United Kingdom in 2012 and 2013.

== Bibliography ==
=== Novels ===
- A Man Was Going Down the Road — Merani Publishing, 1973; Arete Publishing, 2007
- Everyone That Findeth Me — Soviet Georgia Publishing, 1975; Arete Publishing, 2007
- The Iron Theatre — Merani Publishing, 1981; Arete Publishing, 2007
- The March Rooster — Merani Publishing, 1987; Arete Publishing, 2007
- Avelum — Merani Publishing, 1995
- The Basket — Rustavi 2 Print, 2003; Arete Publishing, 2006

=== Essays and Documentary Prose ===
- Happy Martyr — Logos Press Publishing, 2003
- Eternity Ahead — Intelekti Publishing, 2009
- The Cloud — Intelekti Publishing, 2014
- The Sky Starts on Earth — Intelekti Publishing, 2010

=== Drama ===
- Tsete’s Red Boots — Pegasi Publishing, 2007
- Labyrinth — 1990

=== Poetry Collections ===
- Trains and Passengers — Soviet Writer Publishing, 1959
- Clay Tablets — Soviet Georgia Publishing, 1963
- The Child Humored the Guests — Merani Publishing, 1968
- Nine Long Poems — Soviet Georgia Publishing, 1969
- The Other Side of Heart — Soviet Georgia Publishing, 1974
- Remember Life — Soviet Georgia Publishing, 1984; Pegasi Publishing, 2010
- Poems — Merani Publishing, 1987
- The Stairs — Sani Publishing, 2003
- 100 Poems — Intelekti Publishing, 2009
- Poetry Collection — Pegasi Publishing, 2010
- The Sun in December — Merani Publishing, 1999

== Awards and honours ==
- Literary Award SABA 2003 in category the best novel for The Basket.
- Ilia Chavchavadze State Prize 1997 for Artistic Work.
- The State Prize of Georgia 1993 for his Contribution to the Georgian Literature.
- Shota Rustaveli State Prize 1983 for The Iron Theatre
