= Hilarion the Iberian =

Georgian saint

Saint Hilarion the Iberian
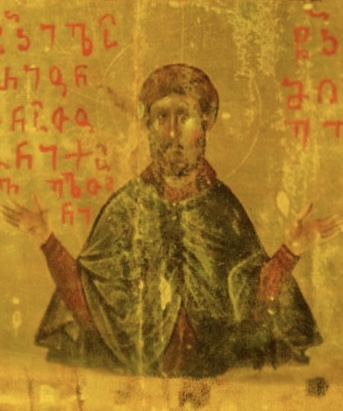
- Hilarion on 14th century triptych at Saint Catherine's Monastery

Holy Father
- Born: c. 822; Kakheti, Kingdom of the Iberians
- Died: c. 875; Thessaloniki, Byzantine Empire
- Venerated in: Eastern Orthodox Church
- Major shrine: David Gareja
- Feast: December 2
- Patronage: Georgia

Hilarion the Iberian (Georgian: ილარიონ ქართველი, romanized: ilarion kartveli) (c. 822–875) was a Georgian monk from the Kakheti region and bishop of David Gareja. He was considered a thaumaturgus and is venerated as a saint. His vita was composed after his death on Mount Athos by the followers of Euthymius of Athos. The extant texts date from the 10th and 11th centuries. According to the vita, Hilarion visited the Holy Land and traveled with his followers through Palestine and Syria. He visited Mount Tabor, the Jordan River, and the Lavra of Saint Sabas. Hilarion stayed there for seven years, living in a cave and leading a monastic hermitage. Later, in 864, he founded a monastery on Mount Olympus, possibly identified as the "Lavra of Krania," which largely housed his Georgian compatriots. The church at various times sheltered John the Iberian, Euthymius of Athos, and Tornike Eristavi. Hilarion died in Thessaloniki.

== Bibliography ==
- Tchekhanovets, Yana (2018). The Caucasian Archaeology of the Holy Land: Armenian, Georgian and Albanian Communities between the Fourth and Eleventh Centuries CE. Handbook of Oriental Studies. Section 1 The Near and Middle East, vol. 123. Brill. ISBN 9789004362246.
- Morris, Rosemary (1995). Monks and Laymen in Byzantium, 843–1118. Cambridge University Press. ISBN 9780521265584.
- Louth, Andrew (2007). Greek East and Latin West: The Church, AD 681–1071. St Vladimir's Seminary Press. ISBN 9780881413205.
