= David Turashvili =

Georgian fiction writer (born 1966)

- დავით ტურაშვილი
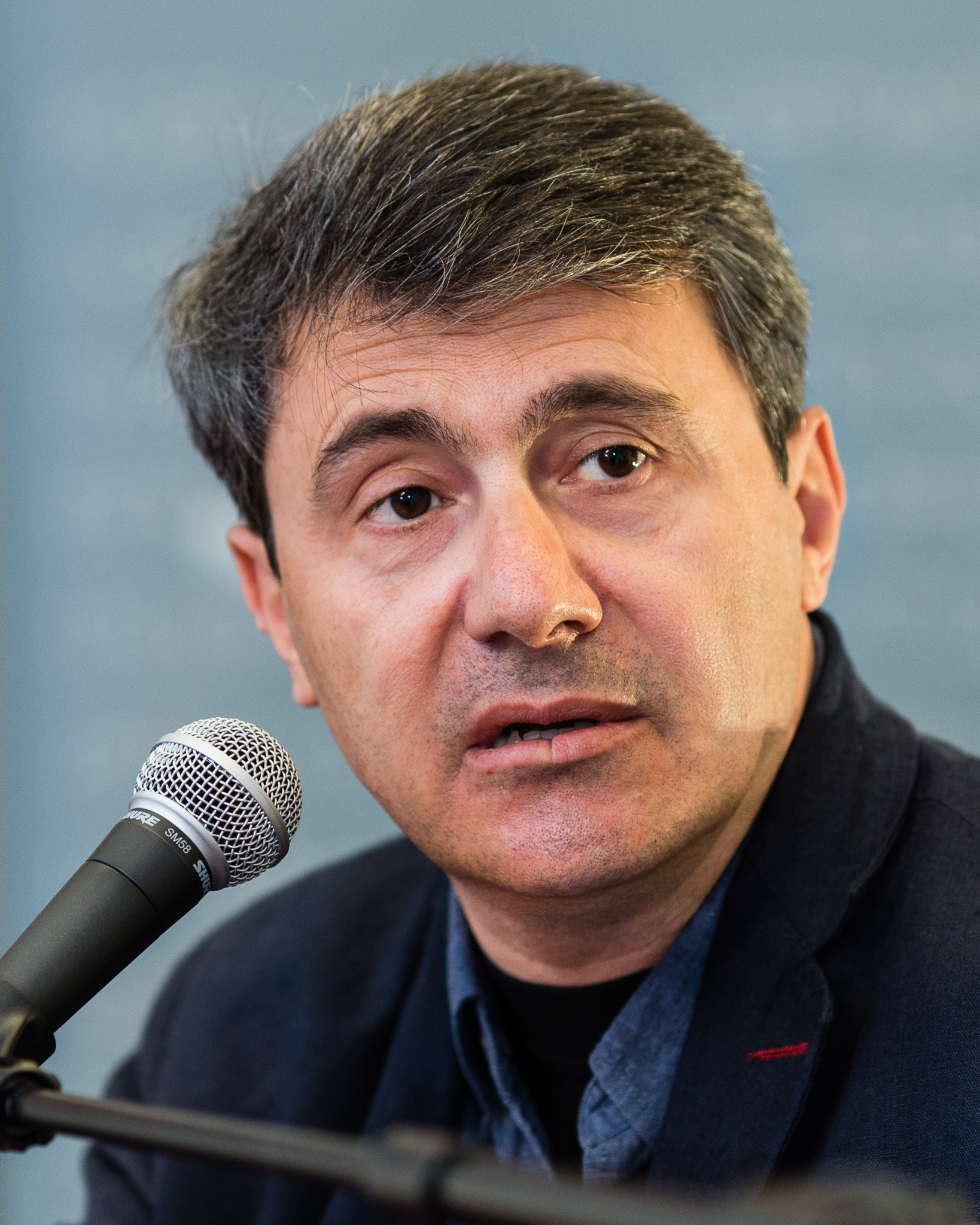
- Born: David Turashvili; May 10, 1966 (age 60); Tbilisi, Georgia
- Occupation: Novelist
- Writing career
- Notable work: Jeans Generation (2008)
- Literary movement: Postmodernism

David "Dato" Turashvili (Georgian: დავით (დათო) ტურაშვილი) (born May 10, 1966 in Tbilisi) is a Georgian fiction writer.

== Biography ==
In 1989, Turashvili was one of the leaders of the student protest action taking place at the Davidgareja monasteries in eastern Georgia, whose territory was exploited by the Soviet Union military as a training ground. His first novels, published in 1988, are based on the turmoil of those events. The premier of his play Jeans Generation was held in May 2001. Turashvili's other publications include the travelogues Known and Unknown America (1993) and Kathmandu (1998), and two collections of short fiction and movie scripts; his first collection of short fiction is Merani (1991).

Besides scripts, Turashvili writes novels, short stories and plays, including 16 books in Georgia. His works have been translated into seven languages and published in periodicals of various countries. His novel Flight from the USSR has been published in five European countries. He is the author of Georgian best-sellers and has participated in Mountaineers' expedition in the mountains of the Caucasus, Andes and Himalayas. Furthermore, he is the author of scientific-research letters in literary criticism and historiography. He has translated both prosaic and poetic texts from Russian, English, Spanish, and Turkish.

== Bibliography ==
- A Collection of Short Stories (1991)
- Known and Unknown America (1993)
- Festival of Loneliness (1995)
- Where did Sumerians Go (1997)
- My Irish Grandfather (1999)
- Kathmandu (1998)
- Tibet is not Far Away (2001)
- A Night of a Sunken City (2003)
- Black Sneakers (2006)
- Gurji Khatun (2007)
- Flight from the USSR (Jeans Generation) (2008)
- The Thirteenth (2009)
- American Fairy Tales (2010)
- If I were a Football Player (2011)
- While Waiting for Dodo (2012)
- Once upon a Time (2012)
- The King of Woods (2013)
- Another Amsterdam (2014)

=== Plays ===
- One Fine Day (1991), Kutaisi Drama Theatre
- Dialogues in Train (1993), Rustaveli Theatre
- Troubadour (1997), Manhattan Theatrical Studio and Tkibuli Public Theatre
- Jeans Generation (2001), Free Theatre
- Green Horizon (2003), Free Theatre
- Two Islands in the Black Sea (2005), Bolnisi Theatre
- Tomorrow they will fly above our Garden (2007), “Come and See” Theatre
- Border Line (2008), Marjanishvili Theatre
- Black Sneakers (2009), Free Theatre
- Euro-Georgia (2011), Marjanishvili Theatre
- While Waiting for Dodo (2012), Akhaltsikhe Theatre
- While Waiting for Dodo (2013), Marjanishvili Theatre

== Translations ==
- Jeans Generation, Translated into Dutch by Ingrid Dekhrave, publishing house Cossee (2013)
- Jeans Generation, translated into Croatian, publishing house Sandorf (2013)
- Jeans Generation, translated into Italian by Ketevan Charkviani, Publishing house Palombi Editori (2013)
- Jeans Generation, translated into Turkish by Fahrettin Çiloğlu, Publishing house Ezgi Kitabevi (2012)
- Jeans Generation, translated into Armenian by Esmeralda Yeritsyan, Publishing house Antares [Անտարես] (2014)

== Awards ==
- Literary Award “Saba” in the nomination for “The Best Novel” - Black Sneakers (2008)

== See also ==
- Tbilisi hijacking incident
- List of Georgians
