= A Man Was Going Down the Road =

1973 book by Otar Tschiladse

- Author: Otar Chiladze
- Original title: გზაზე ერთი კაცი მიდიოდა
- Translator: Donald Rayfield
- Language: Georgian
- Genre: Magic realism, allegory, mythology, historical fiction
- Publisher: Garnett Press
- Publication date: 1973
- Publication place: Georgia
- Media type: Print (hardback & paperback)
- Pages: 436 pages
- ISBN: 0956468306

A Man Was Going Down the Road (Georgian: გზაზე ერთი კაცი მიდიოდა) is a novel written by Otar Chiladze in 1973. It was translated into English by Donald Rayfield in 2012.

== Synopsis ==
A Man Was Going Down the Road begins with the Greek legend of Jason and the Golden Fleece and the consequences for the obscure kingdom of Colchis after the Greek Jason comes and abducts Medea. But it is also an allegory of the treachery and destruction that ensued when Russia, and then the Soviets, annexed Georgia, as well as Chiladze's interpretation of life as a version of the ancient Anatolian story of Gilgamesh, and a study of Georgian life, domestic and political, in which women and children pay the price for the hero's quests, obsessions and doubts.

== Plot ==
The novel is written in three parts, spanning generations. The first part, Aeëtes, tells the story of Phrixus and his upbringing by King AEetes, the king of Colchis. In his new land, Phrixos would always be an outsider "like a cuckoo's egg" and forever in debt to the people who saved him and reared him. This is also the tale of Jason, the Argonauts, and the Golden Fleece. Jason arrives from Greece to steal the golden wool, but kidnaps Medea, the daughter of King AEetes, as she drugs her father in order to also steal the golden fleece of the winged ram. Young and handsome, Jason is regarded as a hero, although a "wrongdoer".

Part II, Ukheiro, is of a warrior, who breaks his leg in battle. His wife Marekhi dies in childbirth and Ukheiro's 10-year-old daughter Popina looks after her father and the new-born boy, Parnaoz. While waiting for death – for he can no longer fight as a warrior – Ukheiro takes up embroidery. His son Parnaoz falls madly in love with Ino, the seventh daughter of black-eyed Malalo. But theirs is a troubled relationship, and he has a competitor. Parnaoz's sister Popina has a son, Popeye, whose father flees at news of the pregnancy. As Popeye grows, he too falls in the love with Ino. The rivalry between Parnaoz and his nephew Popeye is intense, and Parnaoz eventually leaves Colchis for Crete.

Part III, Parnaoz, is the story of Parnaoz's return to Colchis after about 10 years in Crete. But Ino has not yet married, and the rivalry between Parnaoz and Popeye continues. Parnaoz marries his childhood friend, Tina, but he "didn't care whom he married" for he was "looking for a refuge.. somewhere to hide from Ino." Tina and Parnaoz soon have a son, little Ukheiro, but Parnaoz now wants to leave his wife. "Parnaoz knew only one thing: whether he got together with Ino or not, he could never accept not being with her, or any substitute life offered, or anything from life." Interwoven in this section is also the tale of Icarus and Daedalus. In Greek mythology, father and son attempt to flee Crete with waxed and feathered wings. Icarus does not heed his father's warning, and flies too close to the sun. The heat melts the waxed wings, and he falls into the sea and drowns. What follows Parnaoz's disillusionment with his wife, and his constant pining for Ino, is the tragedy that comes from not heeding any warning, and from idealistic and obsessive love.

== Characters ==
=== Characters from mythology ===
- Aeëtes was a king of Colchis in Greek mythology, son of the sun-god Helios and the Oceanid Perseis (a daughter of Oceanus), brother of Circe and Pasiphaë, and father of Medea, Chalciope and Absyrtus. The name means "eagle" (aietos). His consorts were Idyia and either Asterodia the Oceanid, Neaera the Nereid. According to others, he was the brother of Perses, a king of Tauris, husband of his niece Hecate, and father of Medea, Chalciope and Absyrtus. Yet other versions make Aeëtes a native of Corinth and son of Ephyra, or else of a certain Antiope.
- Medea is a sorceress who was the daughter of King Aeëtes of Colchis, niece of Circe, granddaughter of the sun god Helios, and later wife to the hero Jason, with whom she had two children, Mermeros and Pheres. In Euripides's play Medea, Jason leaves Medea when Creon, king of Corinth, offers him his daughter, Glauce. The play tells of Medea avenging her husband's betrayal by killing their children.
- Absyrtus was in Greek mythology the son of Aeëtes and a brother of Medea and Chalciope. His mother is variously given: Hyginus calls her Ipsia, Hesiod and the Bibliotheca call her Idyia, Apollonius calls her Asterodeia, and others Neaera or Eurylyte. When Medea fled with Jason, she took her brother Absyrtus with her, and when she was nearly overtaken by her father, she murdered her brother, cut his body into pieces and strewed them on the road, so that her father might thus be delayed by gathering the limbs of his child. Tomi, the place where this occurred, was believed to have derived its name from temno (τέμνω, "cut").
- Jason was an ancient Greek mythological hero who was famous for his role as the leader of the Argonauts and their quest for the Golden Fleece. He was the son of Aeson, the rightful king of Iolcos. He was married to the sorceress Medea. Because he belongs to mythology, he may have existed before the Greek Dark Ages (1100–800 BC.) The people who wrote about Jason lived around 300 BC. Jason appeared in various literary works in the classical world of Greece and Rome, including the epic poem Argonautica and the tragedy Medea. In the modern world, Jason has emerged as a character in various adaptations of his myths, such as the 1963 film Jason and the Argonauts and the 2000 miniseries of the same name. Jason is also the main character in the British television series Atlantis.
- Minos he was the first King of Crete, son of Zeus and Europa. Every nine years, he made King Aegeus pick seven young boys and seven young girls to be sent to Daedalus' creation, the labyrinth, to be eaten by the Minotaur. After his death, Minos became a judge of the dead in the underworld. The Minoan civilization of Crete has been named after him by the archaeologist Arthur Evans. By his wife, Pasiphaë (or some say Crete), he fathered Ariadne, Androgeus, Deucalion, Phaedra, Glaucus, Catreus, Acacallis and Xenodice. By a nymph, Pareia, he had four sons, Eurymedon, Nephalion, Chryses and Philolaus, who were killed by Heracles in revenge for the murder of the latter's two companions; and by Dexithea, one of the Telchines, he had a son called Euxanthius. By Androgeneia of Phaistos he had Asterion, who commanded the Cretan contingent in the war between Dionysus and the Indians. Also given as his children are Euryale, possibly the mother of Orion with Poseidon, and Pholegander, eponym of the island Pholegandros.
- Icarus – In Greek mythology, Icarus (the Latin spelling, conventionally adopted in English; Ancient Greek: Ἴκαρος, Íkaros, Etruscan: Vikare) is the son of the master craftsman Daedalus, the creator of the Labyrinth. Often depicted in art, Icarus and his father attempt to escape from Crete by means of wings that his father constructed from feathers and wax. Icarus's father warns him first of complacency and then of hubris, asking that he fly neither too low nor too high, so the sea's dampness would not clog his wings or the sun's heat melt them. Icarus ignored his father's instructions not to fly too close to the sun, whereupon the wax in his wings melted and he fell into the sea. This tragic theme of failure at the hands of hubris contains similarities to that of Phaëthon.
- Daedalus was a skillful craftsman and artist. He is the father of Icarus, the uncle of Perdix and possibly also the father of Iapyx although this is unclear.

== Major themes ==
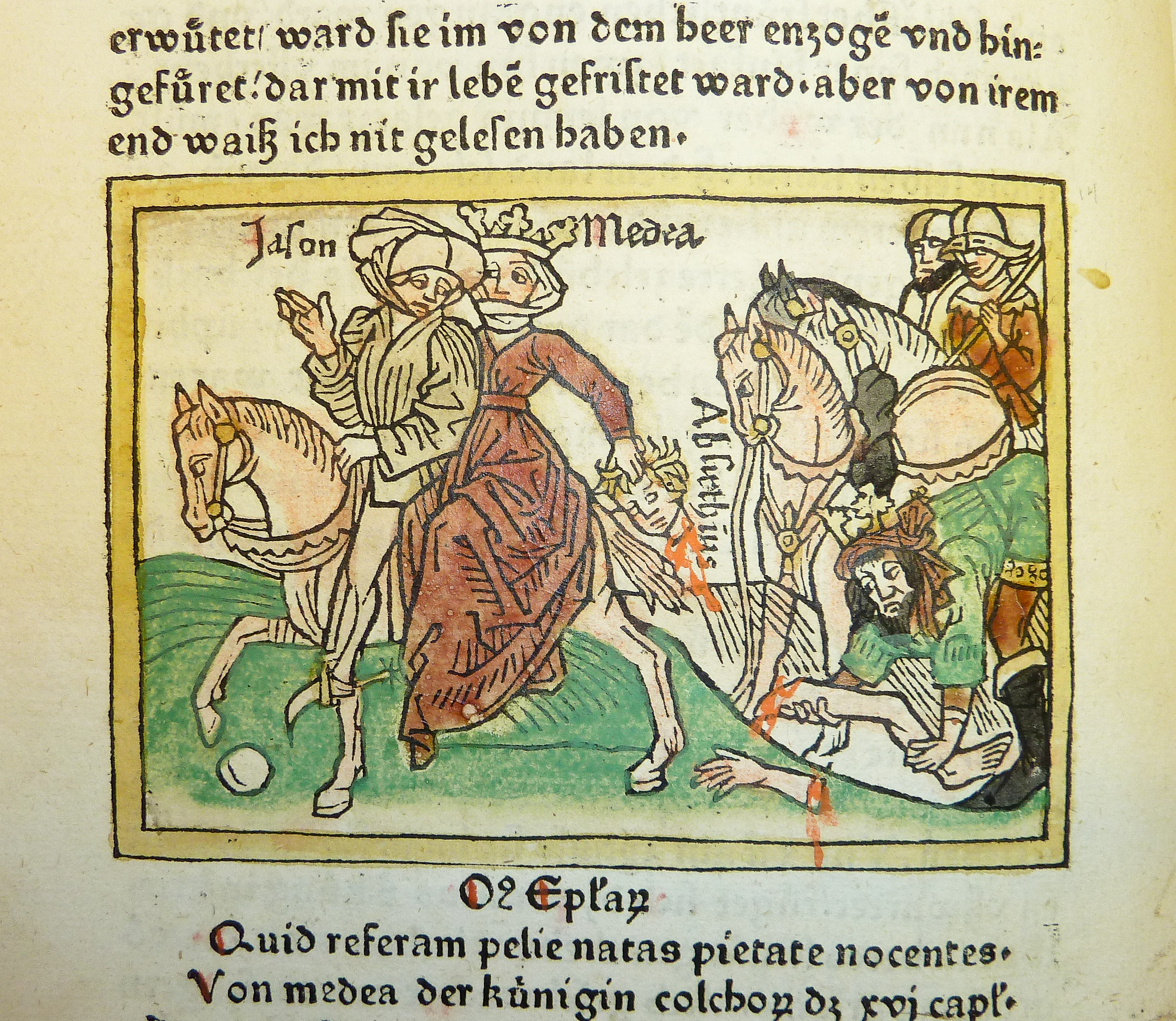
Woodcut illustration of the escape of Jason with Medea and the death of her brother Absyrtis – Penn Provenance Project

Chiladze wrote A Man Was Going Down the Road in the early 1970s while Georgia was still a part of the Soviet Union. The book is allegorical. In the story of how Colchis was overrun by outsiders – and native Colchians like Popeye were turned into informants and torturers – Chiladze is telling Georgia's story.

As Bochia talked, he too was amazed how everything took on a fairy-tale wonder and enchantment, things that hitherto only he had known that had been permanently deposited, together with countless other memories, in the depths of his heart and, perhaps, had thus lost their colour and meaning, like grandmother's wedding dress. But now, brought into the sunlight, taken out of the trunk, aired in the breeze, in front of so many curious grandchildren, it not only recovered its original softness and lightness, it reanimated its owner's intoxicating virginity, the quivering as her wedding was prepared. People's hearts swelled with pride, they choked on belated tears, and an equally belated regret distressed them, because they had so easily and casually forgotten such a fine, beautiful grandmother whose grave they could no longer find, if only to clear it of weeds and sit just for a minute at her feet (415–16).

— Otar Chiladze, A Man Was Going Down the Road
