= Armenian Encyclopedia =

Armenian Encyclopedia may refer to:

- Armenian Encyclopedia Publishing House
- Armenian Soviet Encyclopedia (1974-1987)
- Armenian Concise Encyclopedia (1990-2003)
