= Khudaverdyan =

Khudaverdyan (Armenian: Խուդավերդյան) is an Armenian surname, a patronymic surname derived from the given name Khydaverdy or variants, see "Khudayberdiev" for its etymology. Notable people with the surname include:

- Konstantin Khudaverdyan (1929–1999), Armenian historian
- Tigran Khudaverdyan (born 1981), Armenian businessman

== See also ==
- Khudaverdiyev
