= Georgians =

Caucasian ethnic group

Georgians ქართველები Kartvelebi
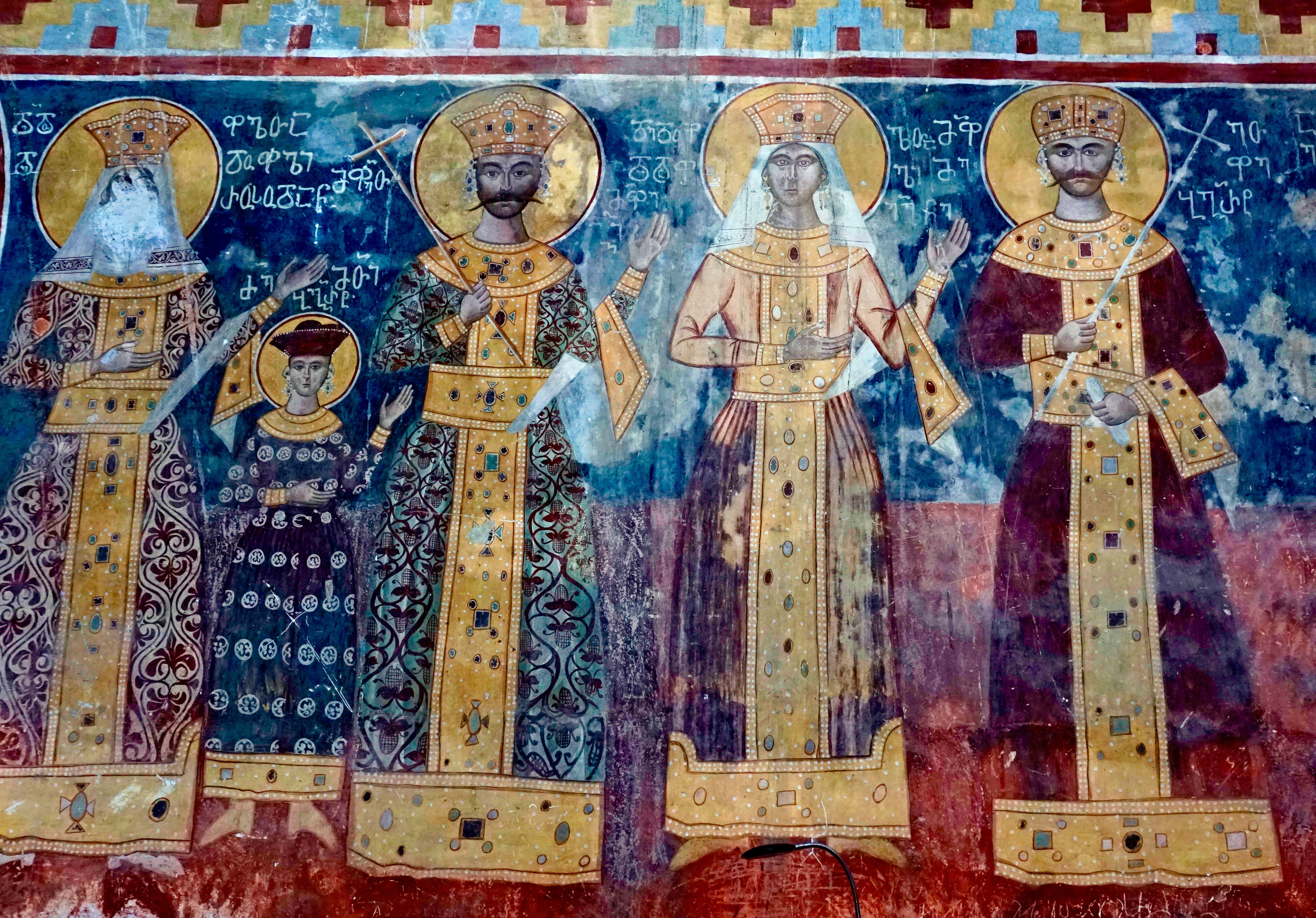
- Georgian kings and queens consort depicted on a Byzantine-influenced fresco (Note: The fresco was a demonstration of the ambitious imperial example on which the Georgian monarchs modeled themselves and competed in magnificence with those of the Byzantine Empire.) wearing Byzantine dress at the Gelati Monastery, UNESCO's World Heritage Site landmark.

Total population
- c. 5 million (Note: The total figure is merely an estimation; sum of all the referenced populations only.)

Regions with significant populations
- Georgia 3,304,075 (Note: Ethnic Georgians are 84.1% of Georgia's current population of 3.9 million. Data without the Russian-occupied territories of Georgia.) (more data)

Languages
- Georgian and other Kartvelian languages

Religion
- Predominant: Georgian Orthodoxy; Significant: Catholicism and Islam

The Georgians, or Kartvelians (Note: The term Kartveli, derived from Old Georgian Kartueli (ႵႠႰႧႭႳႤႪႨ), originally designated inhabitants of the Kingdom of Iberia and were natively known as Kartvelians, that stood at the political, cultural, religious and economic vanguard of the nation. Kartvelians, tracing their definitive appearance since post-Assyrian times, gradually became a dominant element in nation-building that would give its name to the whole country and people. After the Georgian unification, the term would come to signify all-Georgian enterprise, becoming absolute and universal.) (/kɑːrtˈvɛliənz/; Georgian: ქართველები, romanized: kartvelebi, pronounced [kʰaɾtʰʷelebi]), are a nation and Caucasian ethnic group native to present-day Georgia and surrounding areas historically associated with the Georgian kingdoms. Significant Georgian diaspora communities are also present throughout Russia, Turkey, Greece, Iran, Ukraine, the United States, and the European Union.

Georgians are ethno-linguistically separate from all of their neighboring nations and primarily speak Georgian, a Kartvelian language with no known relation to any other language family in the world. Georgians arose from Colchian and Iberian civilizations of classical antiquity; Colchis was interconnected with the Hellenic world, whereas Iberia was influenced by the Achaemenid Empire until Alexander the Great conquered it. In the early 4th century, the Georgians became one of the first to embrace Christianity. The vast majority of Georgians are Orthodox Christians, with most following their national Georgian Orthodox Church; there are also some historically Catholic and Muslim communities, as well as a significant number of irreligious Georgians. Located in the Caucasus, on the continental crossroads of Europe and Asia, the High Middle Ages saw Georgian people form a unified Kingdom of Georgia in 1008 AD, later inaugurating the Georgian Golden Age. This lasted until the kingdom was weakened and later disintegrated as the result of the 13th–15th-century invasions of the Mongols and Timur, the Black Death, the Fall of Constantinople, as well as internal divisions following the death of George V the Brilliant in 1346, the last of the great kings of Georgia.

Thereafter and throughout the early modern period, Georgians became politically fractured and were locked in conflict with much larger Muslim empires to its south, like the Ottoman Empire and successive dynasties of Iran. Georgians started looking for allies and found the Russians on the political horizon as a possible replacement for the lost Byzantine Empire "for the sake of the Christian faith". The Georgian kings and Russian tsars exchanged no less than 17 embassies, culminating in 1783 when Heraclius II of the eastern Georgian kingdom of Kartli-Kakheti forged an alliance with the Russian Empire. However, the Russo-Georgian alliance backfired as Russia was unwilling to fulfill the terms of the treaty, proceeding to annex Georgia in a piecemeal manner throughout the 1800s. Georgians reasserted their independence from Russia under the First Georgian Republic from 1918 to 1921 and finally in 1991 from the Soviet Union.

The Georgian nation was formed out of a diverse set of geographic subgroups, each with its characteristic traditions, manners, dialects and, in the case of Svans and Mingrelians, own regional languages. The Georgian language has its own unique writing system and extensive written tradition dating back to the 5th century. According to unofficial estimates from the State Ministry on Diaspora Issues of Georgia, there are about 5 million Georgians in the world.

== Etymology ==
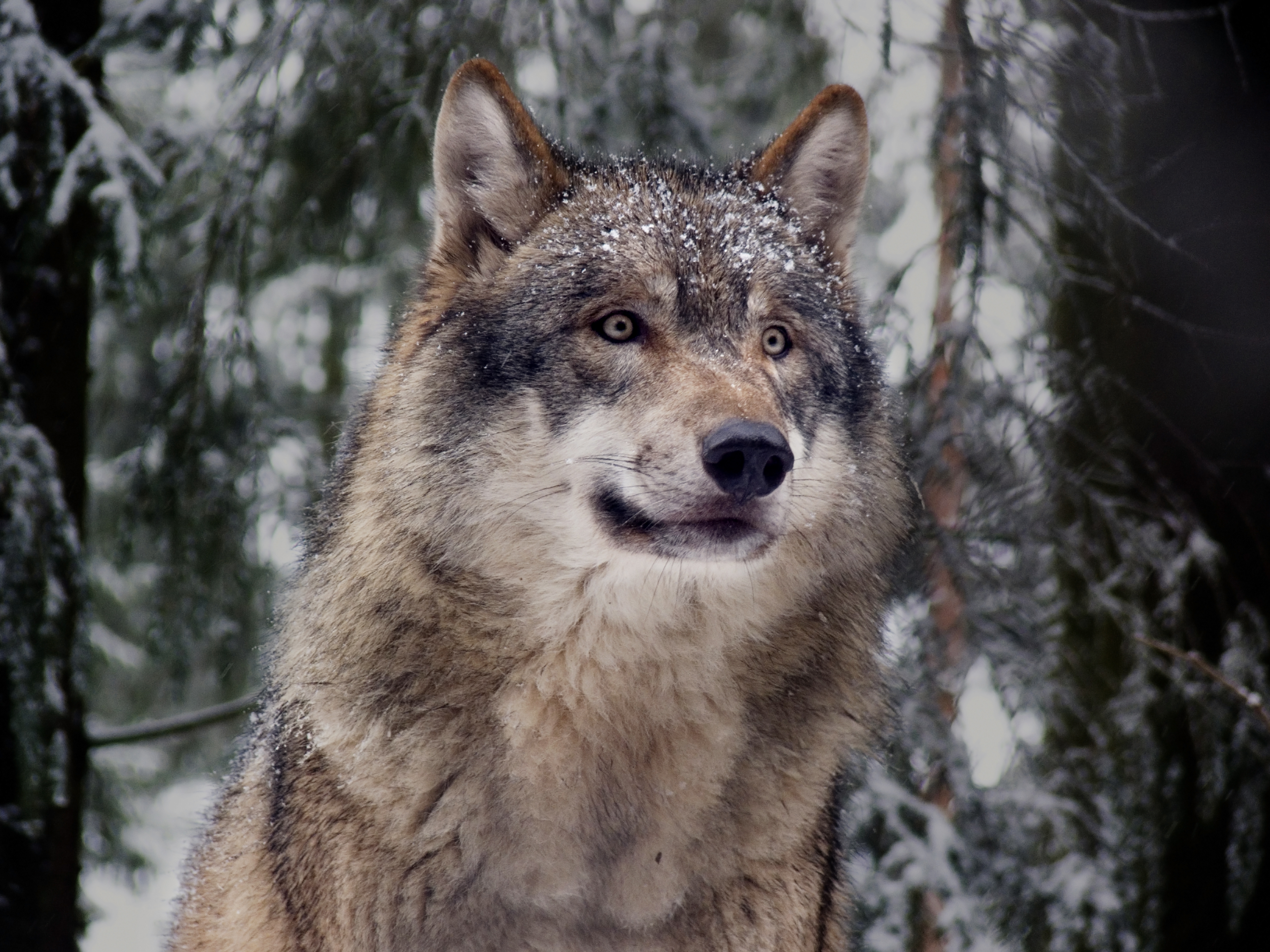
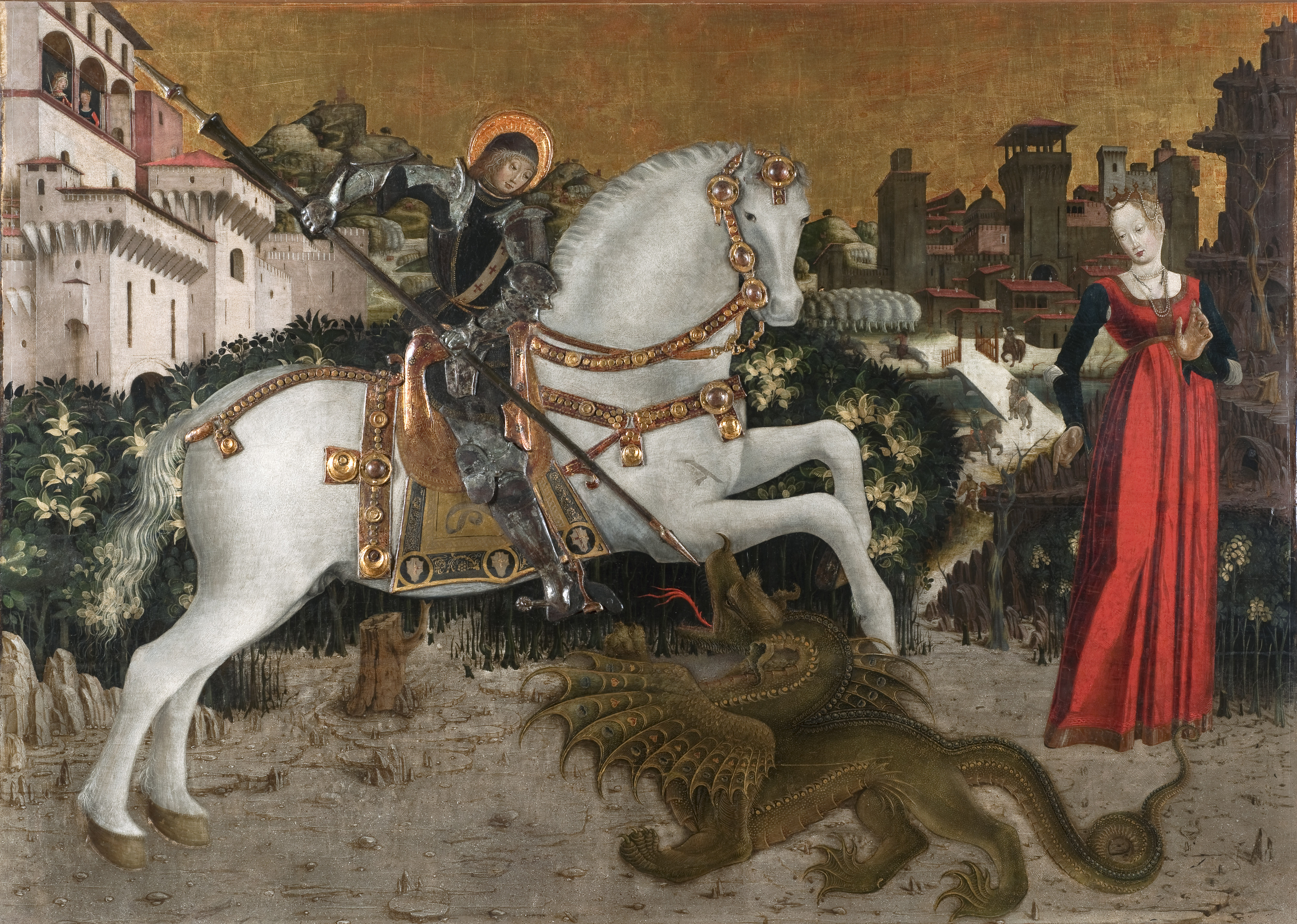
An exonymic term "Georgian" resulted from the merger of Persian designation "gurğ" (wolf), with the cult of Saint George popular among the Georgians. The saint's name played a definite role in the transformation of "gurğ/gorg" into "Georgia/Georgian".
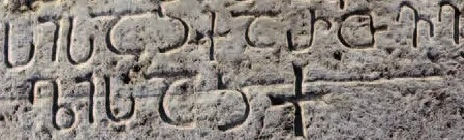
The earliest known example for an endonym "kartveli" (ႵႠႰႧႥႤႪႨ) was found as an archaeological artifact in the neighborhood of Umm Leisun, nearby Jerusalem.

Georgians call themselves Kartveli (ქართველი, pl. Kartvelebi ქართველები), their land Sakartvelo (საქართველო), and their language Kartuli (ქართული). According to The Georgian Chronicles, the ancestor of the Kartvelian people was Kartlos, the great-grandson of the Biblical Japheth. However, scholars agree that the word is derived from the Karts, the latter being one of the proto-Georgian tribes that emerged as a dominant group in ancient times. Kart probably is cognate with Indo-European gard and denotes people who live in a "fortified citadel". Ancient Greeks (Homer, Herodotus, Strabo, Plutarch etc.) and Romans (Titus Livius, Cornelius Tacitus, etc.) referred to western Georgians as Colchians and eastern Georgians as Iberians.

The term "Georgians" is derived from the country of Georgia. In the past, lore-based theories were given by the medieval French traveller James of Vitry, who explained the name's origin by the popularity of St. George amongst Georgians, while traveller Jean Chardin thought that "Georgia" came from Greek γεωργός ("tiller of the land"), as when the Greeks came into the region (in Colchis) they encountered a developed agricultural society.

However, as Alexander Mikaberidze adds, these explanations for the word Georgians/Georgia are rejected by the scholarly community, who point to the Persian word gurğ/gurğān ("wolf") as the root of the word. Starting with the Persian word gurğ/gurğān, the word was later adopted in numerous other languages, including Slavic and West European languages. This term itself might have been established through the ancient Iranian appellation of the near-Caspian region, which was referred to as Gorgan ("land of the wolves").

== History ==
=== Antiquity ===
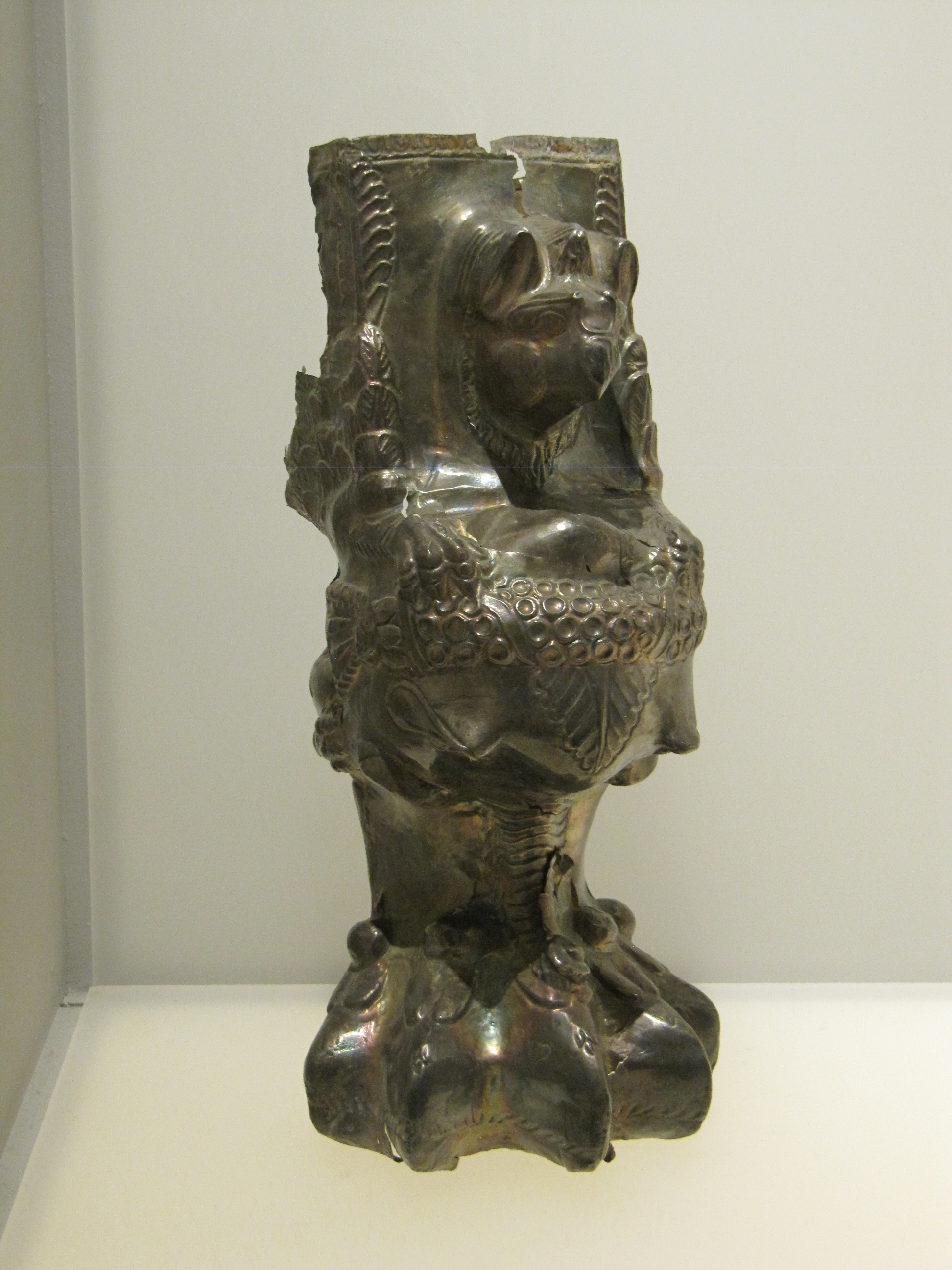
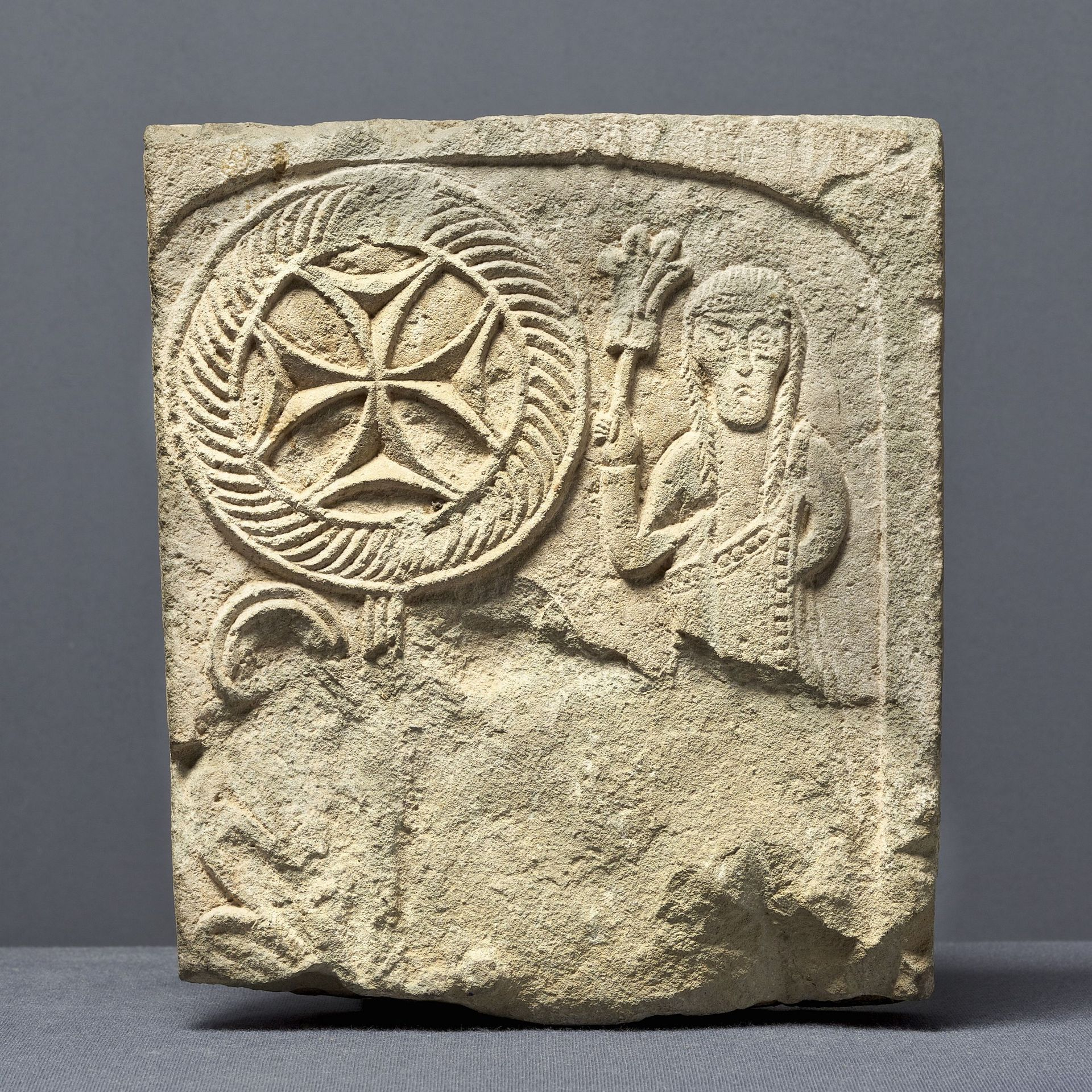
Claw foot of the Iberian royal throne found at Mount Bagineti, 2nd century AD. (left) The stele of Samtsevrisi depicting veneration of the Bolnisi cross by an Iberian nobleman wearing a Byzantine dress and holding flower insignia, 5th century AD.

Most historians, as well as anthropologists, archaeologists, and linguists, agree that the ancestors of modern Georgians inhabited the southern Caucasus and northern Anatolia since the Neolithic period. These peoples are usually referred to as Proto-Kartvelian tribes, including early groups such as Colchians and Iberians.

In antiquity, the ancient Greeks and Romans knew the Georgian peoples as Colchians and Iberians. Eastern Georgian tribes (Tibarenians/Iberians) formed their kingdom in the 7th century BCE, while western Georgian tribes (Colchians) established the kingdom of Colchis (c. 1350 BCE), predating the foundation of Kingdom of Iberia in the east.

The formation of these early kingdoms contributed to the consolidation of the Georgian nation. The Jewish historian Josephus mentions Georgians as Iberes, also called Thobel (Tubal). David Marshall Lang argued that the root Tibar gave rise to Iber, leading the Greeks to use the term Iberian for eastern Georgians.

Tribes such as Diauehi (in Assyria) and Taochi (in Greek sources) lived in northeastern Anatolia and are considered ancestors of the Georgians. Modern Georgians still refer to this region as Tao-Klarjeti, part of present-day Turkey, where some Georgian-speaking communities persist.

Colchians, first mentioned in the annals of Tiglath-Pileser I and Urartian king Sarduri II, included western Georgian tribes such as the Meskhetians, while Iberians (or Tiberians/Tiberanians) lived in eastern Georgia. Both played a crucial role in the ethnic and cultural formation of the Georgian nation. According to the scholar of the Caucasian studies Cyril Toumanoff:

Colchis appears as the first Caucasian state to have achieved the coalescence of the newcomer. Colchis can be justly regarded as a Georgian (West Georgian) kingdom… It would seem natural to seek the beginnings of Georgian social history in Colchis, the earliest Georgian formation.

In eastern Georgia, during the 6th–4th centuries BCE, Kartlian tribes consolidated power around Mtskheta, founding the Kingdom of Kartli (Iberia) under Pharnavaz I and establishing the Parnavazid dynasty.

Colchis later became the Roman province of Lazicum under Roman legati, while Iberia accepted Roman protection. By the 3rd century CE, the Laz people established the kingdom of Lazica (Egrisi), lasting until 562 CE.

The Kingdom of Iberia adopted Christianity under King Mirian III (traditionally 324), with St. Nino credited for the conversion. By the mid-4th century, both Lazica and Iberia were officially Christian, aligning with Byzantine Empire culture. Persian rule later introduced Zoroastrianism alongside Christianity in some regions.

King Vakhtang I Gorgasali restored Iberian statehood and promoted independence, though subsequent rulers were sometimes Persian vassals, and the kingdom was occasionally governed by Marzban. By the late 7th century, Byzantine-Persian rivalry declined, paving the way for Arab conquest.

=== Middle Ages ===
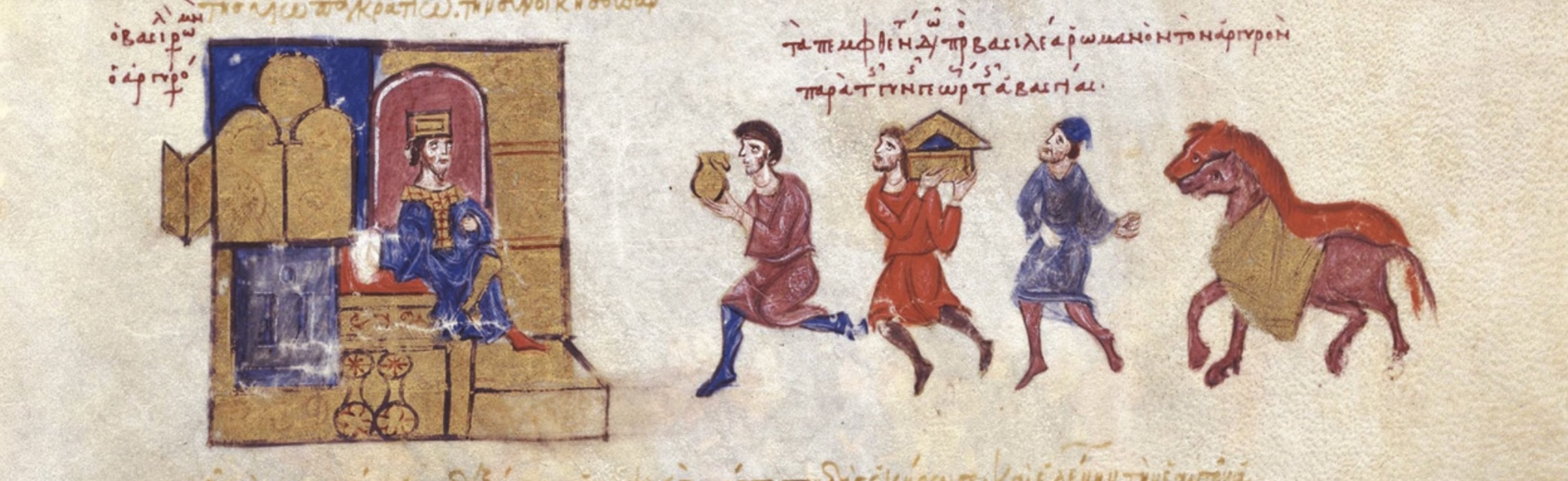
Georgians presenting gifts to Emperor Romanos III Argyros. The Skylitzes Chronicle.

In 645, Arabs invaded southeastern Georgia, initiating an extended period of Muslim domination that led to the emergence of semi-independent feudal states such as the Emirate of Tbilisi and the Principality of Kakheti. In contrast, western Georgia largely remained under the protection of the Byzantine Empire following the Lazic War.

The decline of centralized authority created conditions for the rise of the Bagrationi dynasty in the 9th century. Ashot I (r. 813–830) consolidated power in Tao-Klarjeti and extended his influence over Iberia, earning recognition from both the Abbasid Caliphate and the Byzantine Empire. Later, Adarnase IV succeeded in unifying most Georgian territories and was crowned King of the Iberians in 888.

In western Georgia, the Kingdom of Abkhazia gradually unified local tribes during the 8th century and expanded into Iberia in the 9th–10th centuries. However, persistent dynastic disputes, rival noble factions, and internal instability gradually weakened the Abkhazian monarchy.

Meanwhile, in southern Georgia, David III of Tao emerged as a dominant regional ruler, advocating for the political unification of Georgian territories. Recognizing the potential for consolidation, he supported the young Bagrat III, who held hereditary claims to multiple Georgian thrones. Through a combination of military campaigns, diplomatic alliances, and dynastic legitimacy, Bagrat III successfully unified the principal Georgian polities. In 1008, he was crowned as the first king of a unified Georgia, marking the establishment of a consolidated Georgian state that would later achieve significant cultural and political prominence.

During the 11th century, Georgia faced internal noble conflicts and Byzantine interference, but both the Georgian and Byzantine states opposed the expansion of the Seljuk Empire. After the Battle of Manzikert in 1071, Georgia assumed control over eastern Anatolia and led military campaigns against Turkish forces throughout the 1080s.

Georgia reached its political and cultural zenith in the 12th and early 13th centuries under the reigns of David IV (r. 1089–1125) and Tamar (r. 1184–1213), a period commonly referred to as the Georgian Golden Age.

David IV centralized royal authority, defeated Turkish forces at the Battle of Didgori in 1121, and abolished the Emirate of Tbilisi.

Tamar further strengthened the Georgian state, earning the title of "king of kings". She neutralized internal opposition, expanded Georgian territories into present-day Azerbaijan, Armenia, eastern Turkey, and northern Iran, and established the Empire of Trebizond as a vassal state.

The decline of the Georgian kingdom began after Jalal ad-Din captured Tbilisi in 1226, followed by the Mongol invasions. George V the Brilliant (r. 1314–1346) later restored political unity and revitalized Christian culture. However, subsequent Timurid invasions and persistent internal conflicts hindered full consolidation of the kingdom, ultimately contributing to its fragmentation in the 15th century.

=== Early modern history ===
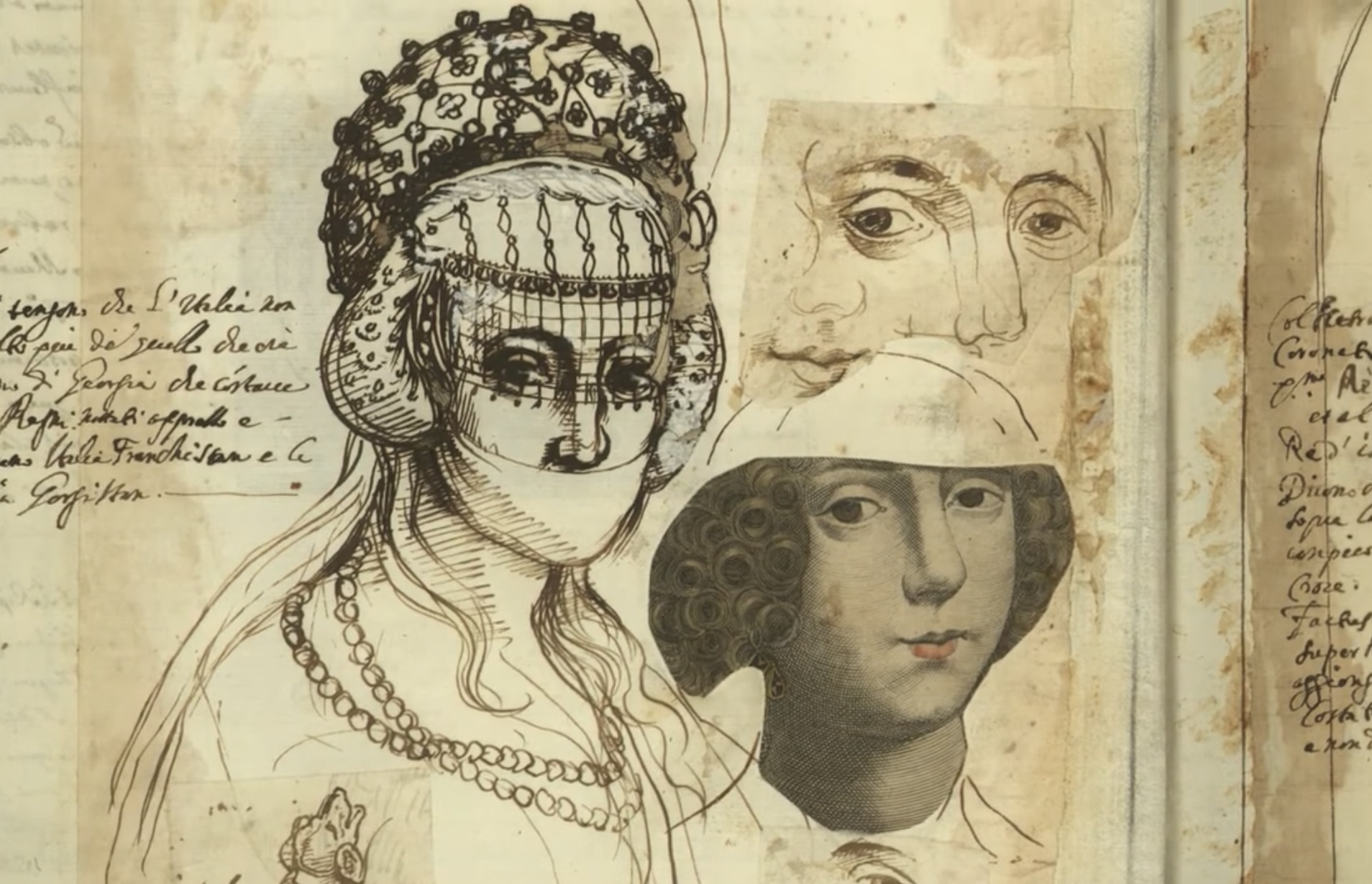
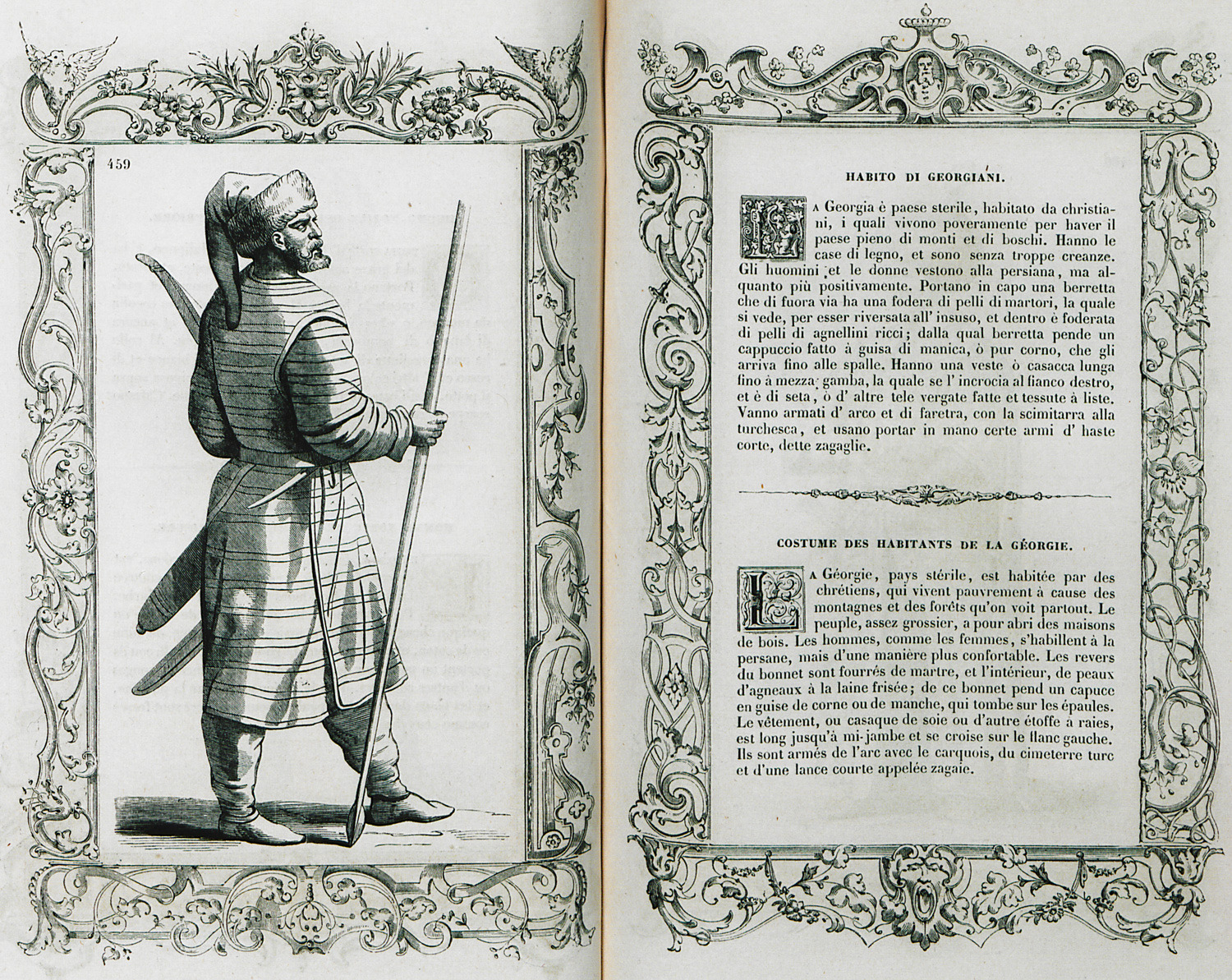
A Georgian woman, by Teramo Castelli; and a man, by Cesare Vecellio.

The Kingdom of Georgia collapsed into anarchy by 1466 and fragmented into three independent kingdoms and five semi-independent principalities. Neighboring empires exploited this division, and from the 16th century, Ottoman and Iranian forces dominated western and eastern Georgia, respectively. Georgian rulers sought ties with Russia: in 1649, the Kingdom of Imereti sent ambassadors, and Alexander III of Imereti swore allegiance to Tsar Alexis of Russia. Subsequent rulers also sought assistance from Pope Innocent XII but without success.

Vassal Georgian states occasionally rebelled. Continuous Ottoman–Persian Wars and deportations reduced Georgia’s population to 784,700 by the late 18th century. Eastern Georgia, under Iranian suzerainty since the Peace of Amasya, regained independence after Nader Shah’s death in 1747 and was reunited under Heraclius II.

In 1783, the Treaty of Georgievsk made Eastern Georgia a Russian protectorate, guaranteeing the Bagrationi dynasty’s rule in exchange for Russian control over foreign affairs.

Russia failed to defend Georgia in 1795 when Iran sacked Tbilisi. Although Russia launched a punitive campaign, it later annexed Eastern Georgia in 1801, abolished the Bagrationi dynasty, and ended the autocephaly of the Georgian Orthodox Church. Pyotr Bagration, a Bagrationi descendant, later became a prominent Russian general in the Napoleonic wars.

=== Modern history ===
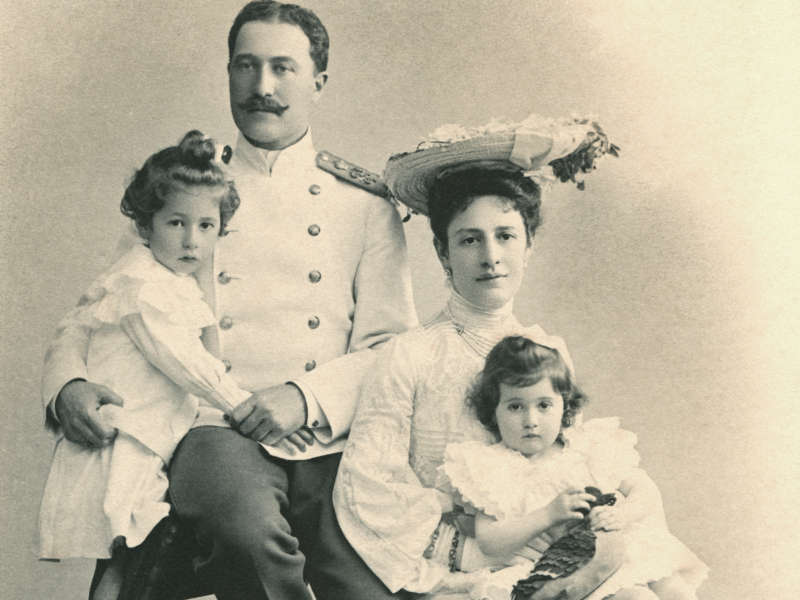
19th century Georgian noble family of General Solomon Makashvili, c. 1900.

Russian authorities sought to integrate Georgia into their empire, but early rule was arbitrary and insensitive to local laws and customs, provoking a conspiracy by Georgian nobles in 1832 and the 1841 Gurian revolt by peasants and nobles.

Many Georgians were upset by the loss of independence of the Georgian Orthodox Church. The Russian clergy took control of Georgian churches and monasteries, prohibiting use of the Georgian liturgy and desecrating medieval Georgian frescoes on various churches all across Georgia.

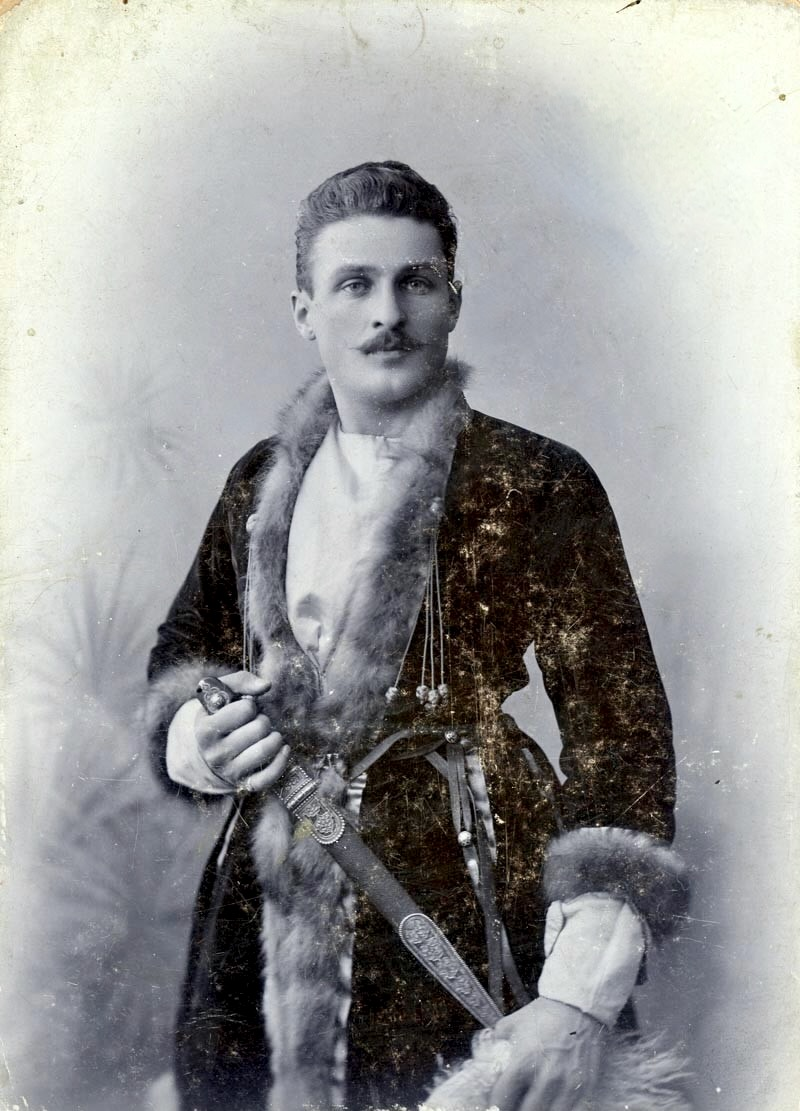
Georgian patriot and anti-Soviet campaigner Leo Kereselidze holding a traditional dagger, historically one of the key accessories of Georgian male attire.

From 1855 to 1907, Prince Ilia Chavchavadze led a Georgian patriotic movement, funding schools, supporting the national theatre, and founding the newspaper Iveria. His efforts, backed by intellectuals such as Giorgi Tsereteli, Ivane Machabeli, Akaki Tsereteli, Niko Nikoladze, Alexander Kazbegi, and Iakob Gogebashvili, revived national consciousness.

The late 19th century saw a Georgian literary revival. Chavchavadze excelled in poetry, novels, short stories, and essays. Akaki Tsereteli became known as "the immortal nightingale of the Georgian people." Alongside Niko Nikoladze and Iakob Gogebashvili, these figures were central to the modern Georgian cultural renaissance.

The Russian Revolution of October 1917 plunged Russia into a bloody civil war during which several outlying Russian territories declared independence. Georgia was one of them, proclaiming the establishment of the independent Democratic Republic of Georgia (DRG) on 26 May 1918. The new country was governed by the Social Democratic Party of Georgia, which established a multi-party system, in sharp contrast to the "dictatorship of the proletariat" established by the Bolsheviks in Russia. In February 1921, the Red Army invaded Georgia and after a short war occupied the country.

After Gorbachev’s perestroika, mass pro-independence protests began to emerge in Georgia from 1988 onward, led by prominent Georgian nationalist figures such as Merab Kostava and Zviad Gamsakhurdia. The following year, the brutal suppression by Soviet forces of a large, peaceful demonstration in Tbilisi on 4–9 April 1989 became a pivotal moment, severely undermining the legitimacy of continued Soviet rule in the country.

In October 1990, the first multi-party elections were held in Soviet Georgia, which were the first multi-party elections in the entire Soviet Union in which the opposition groups were registered as formal political parties. The Round Table—Free Georgia coalition, led by Zviad Gamsakhurdia, secured victory in this election and formed a new government. On 9 April 1991, shortly before the collapse of the Soviet Union, the Supreme Council of Georgia declared independence after a referendum held on 31 March.

== Genetics ==
=== Y-DNA ===
An FTDNA collection of Georgian Y-DNA suggests that Georgians have the highest percentage of Haplogroup G (39.9%) among the general population recorded in any country. Georgians' Y-DNA also belongs to Haplogroup J (32.5%), R1b (8.6%), L (5.4%), R1a (4.2%), I2 (3.8%) and other more minor haplogroups such as E, T, and Q.

== Culture ==
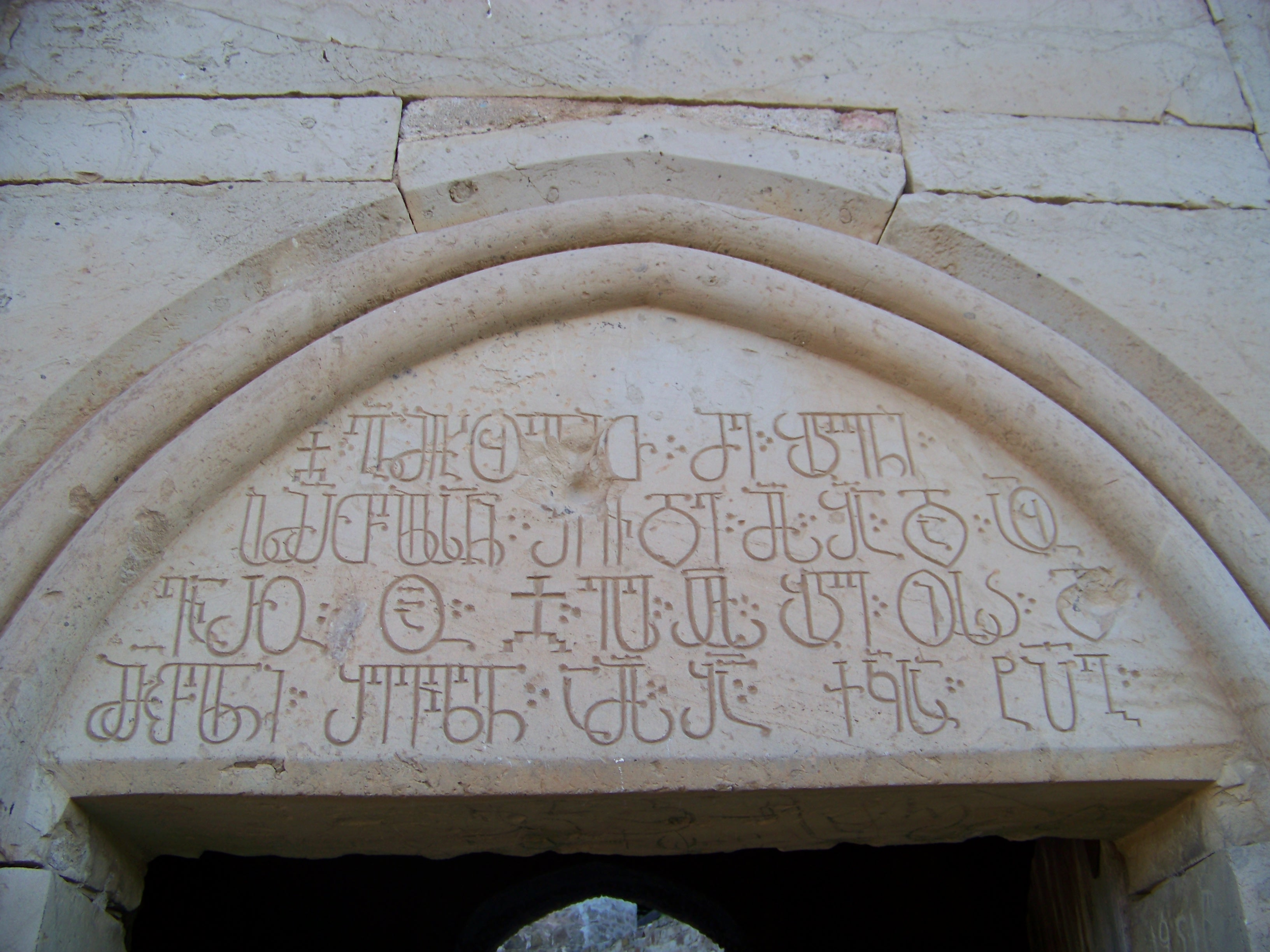
Georgian has been written in its own unique alphabet since the early 5th century.

=== Language and linguistic subdivisions ===
Georgian is the primary language for Georgians of all backgrounds, including those who speak other Kartvelian languages: Svans, Mingrelians, and the Laz. The language known today as Georgian is a traditional language of the eastern part of the country, which spread to most of present-day Georgia after the post-Christianization centralization in the first millennium CE. Today, Georgians, regardless of their ancestral region, use Georgian as their official language. The regional languages Svan and Mingrelian are languages of the west that were traditionally spoken in the pre-Christian Kingdom of Colchis but later lost importance as the unified Kingdom of Georgia emerged. Their decline is largely due to the capital of the unified kingdom, Tbilisi, being in the eastern part of the country known as the Kingdom of Iberia, effectively making the language of the east the official language of the Georgian monarch.

All of these languages comprise the Kartvelian language family, along with the related language of the Laz people, which has speakers in both Turkey and Georgia.

The Georgian language has at least 18 dialects, including Imeretian, Rachan, Lechkhumian, Gurian, Adjarian, Imerkhevian (in Turkey), Kartlian, Kakhetian, Ingiloan (in Azerbaijan), Tushetian, Khevsurian, Mokhevian, Pshavian, Tianetian, Mtiuletian-Gudamaqrian, Fereydanian (in Fereydunshahr and Fereydan, Iran), Meskhetian, and Javakhian.

=== Religion ===
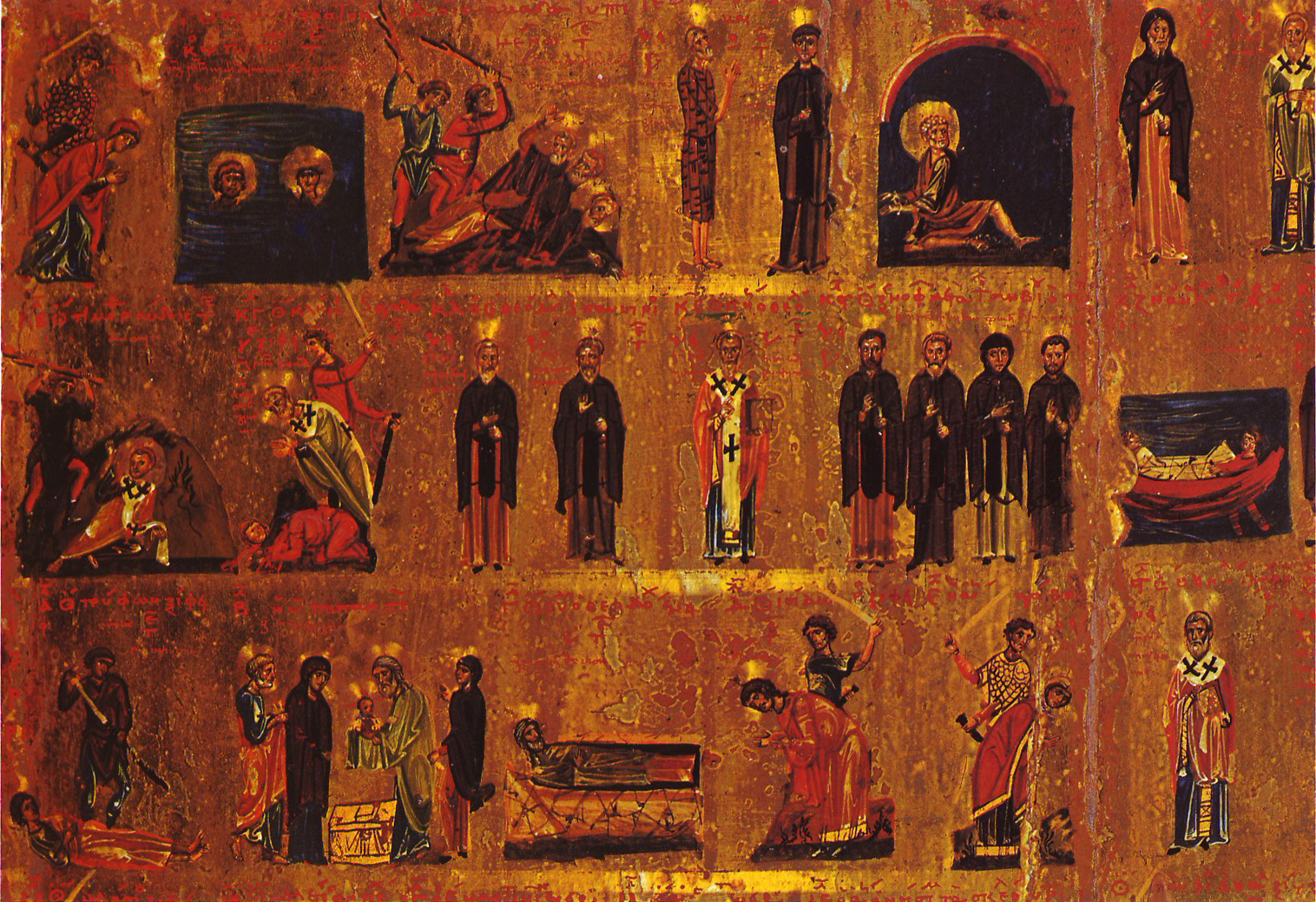
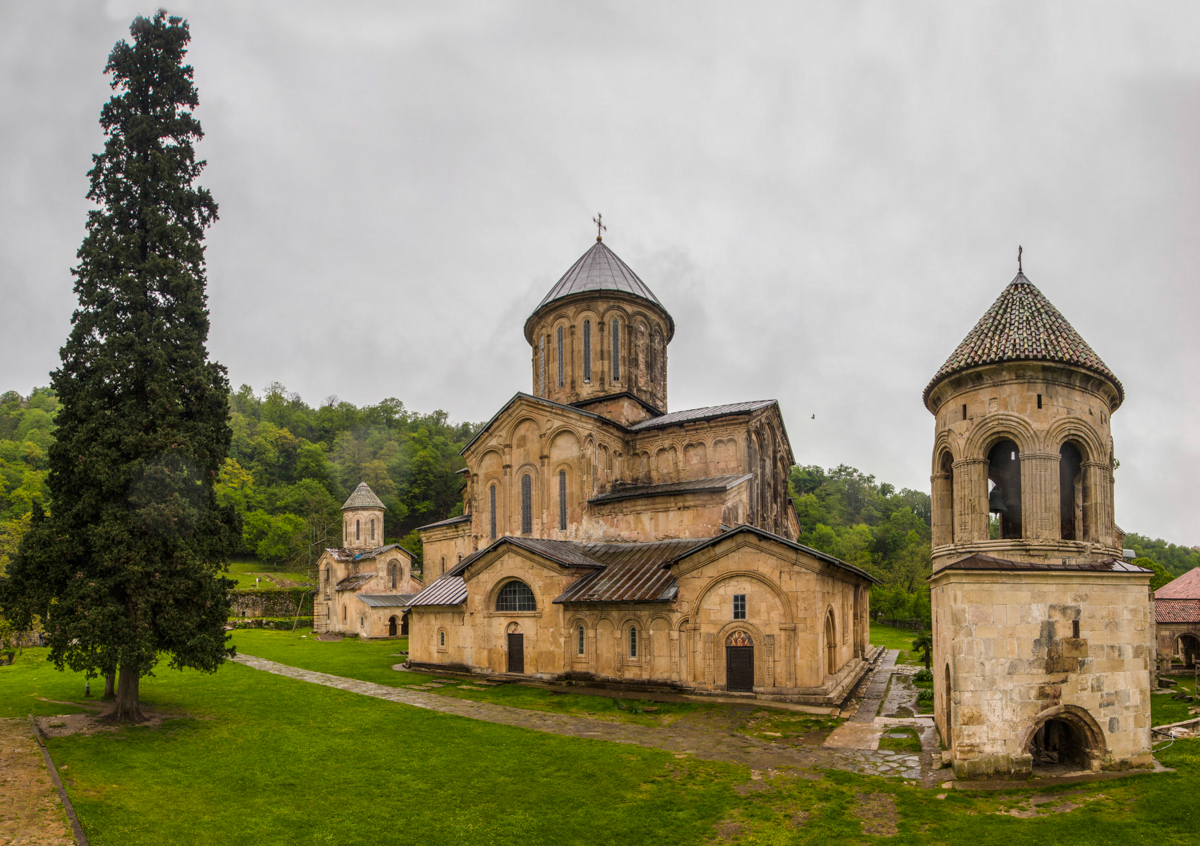
Detail of Menologium, showing saints and martyrs, painted by Georgian artist John Tohabi, 11th century tetraptych from Sinai. (left) Gelati Monastery, one of the most significant religious structures in Georgia, located near the former capital city of Kutaisi.

According to Orthodox tradition, Christianity was first preached in Georgia by the Apostles Simon and Andrew in the 1st century. It became the state religion of Kartli (Iberia) in 319 or 326. At the same time, in the first centuries A.D., the cult of Mithras, pagan beliefs, and Zoroastrianism were commonly practiced in Georgia. The conversion of Kartli to Christianity is credited to St. Nino of Cappadocia. Christianity gradually replaced all the former religions except Zoroastrianism, which become a second established religion in Iberia after the Peace of Acilisene in 378. The conversion to Christianity eventually placed the Georgians permanently on the front line of conflict between the Islamic and Christian world. Georgians remained mostly Christian despite repeated invasions by Muslim powers, and long episodes of foreign domination.

As was true elsewhere, the Christian church in Georgia was crucial to the development of a written language, and most of the earliest written works were religious texts. Medieval Georgian culture was greatly influenced by Eastern Orthodoxy and the Georgian Orthodox Church, which promoted and often sponsored the creation of many works of religious devotion. These included churches and monasteries, works of art such as icons, and hagiographies of Georgian saints.

Today, 83.9% of the Georgian population, most of whom are ethnic Georgian, follow Eastern Orthodox Christianity. A sizable Georgian Muslim population exists in Adjara. This autonomous Republic borders Turkey, and was part of the Ottoman Empire for a longer amount of time than other parts of the country. Those Georgian Muslims practice the Sunni Hanafi form of Islam. Islam has however declined in Adjara during the 20th century, due to Soviet anti-religious policies, cultural integration with the national Orthodox majority, and strong missionary efforts by the Georgian Orthodox Church. In the early modern period, converted Georgian recruits were often used by the Persian and Ottoman Empires for elite military units such as the Mameluks, Qizilbash, and ghulams. The Iranian Georgians are all reportedly Shia Muslims today, while Ingiloy (indigenous to Azerbaijan), Laz (indigenous to Turkey), Imerkhevians (indigenous to Turkey), and Georgians in Turkey (who descend from Georgian immigrants) are mostly Sunni Muslim.

There is also a small number of Georgian Jews, tracing their ancestors to the Babylonian captivity.

In addition to traditional religious confessions, Georgia retains irreligious segments of society, as well as a significant portion of nominally religious individuals who do not actively practice their faith.

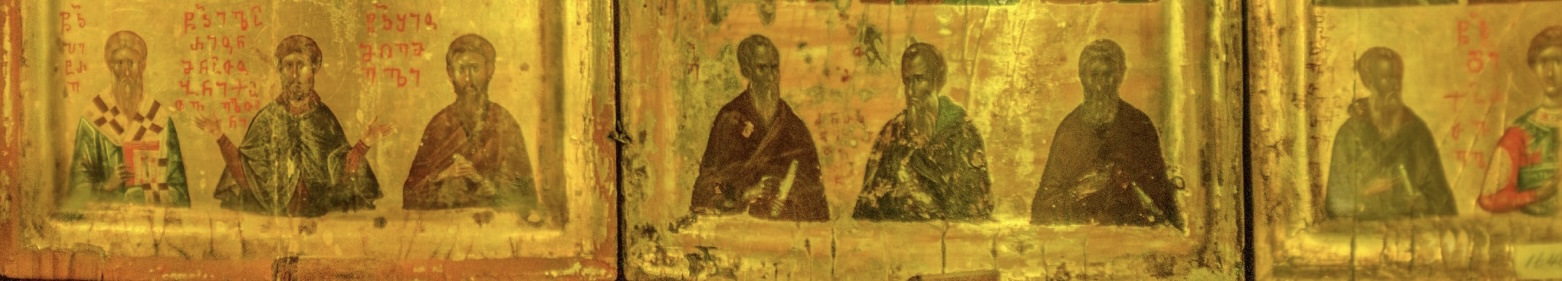
Peter the Iberian, Hilarion the Iberian, Shio of Mgvime, John the Iberian, Euthymius the Athonite, George the Hagiorite and David of Gareji on the 14th-century triptych titled as the "Radiant Georgians", kept at the Saint Catherine's Monastery on Mount Sinai.

=== Cuisine ===
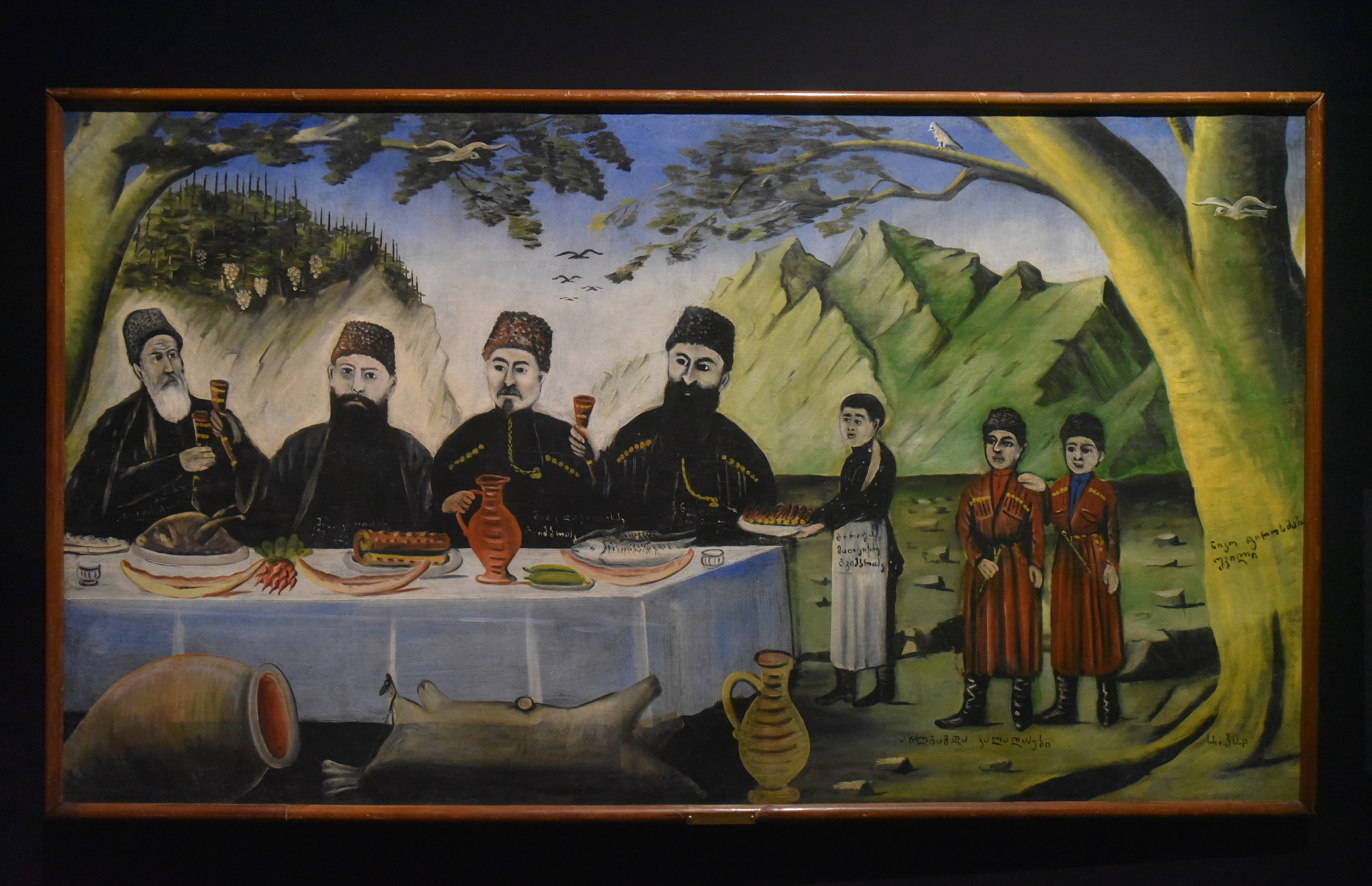
Georgian Supra, by Niko Pirosmani.

The Georgian cuisine is specific to the country; however, it also contains some influences from other European culinary traditions, as well as those from the surrounding Western Asia. Each historical province of Georgia has its own distinct culinary tradition, such as Megrelian, Kakhetian, and Imeretian cuisines. In addition to various meat dishes, Georgian cuisine also offers a variety of vegetarian meals.

The importance of both food and drink to Georgian culture is best observed during a Caucasian feast, or supra, when a huge assortment of dishes is prepared, always accompanied by large amounts of wine, and dinner can last for hours. In a Georgian feast, the role of the tamada (toastmaster) is an important and honoured position.

In countries of the former Soviet Union, Georgian food is popular due to the immigration of Georgians to other Soviet republics, in particular Russia. In Russia all major cities have many Georgian restaurants and Russian restaurants often feature Georgian food items on their menu.

=== Music ===
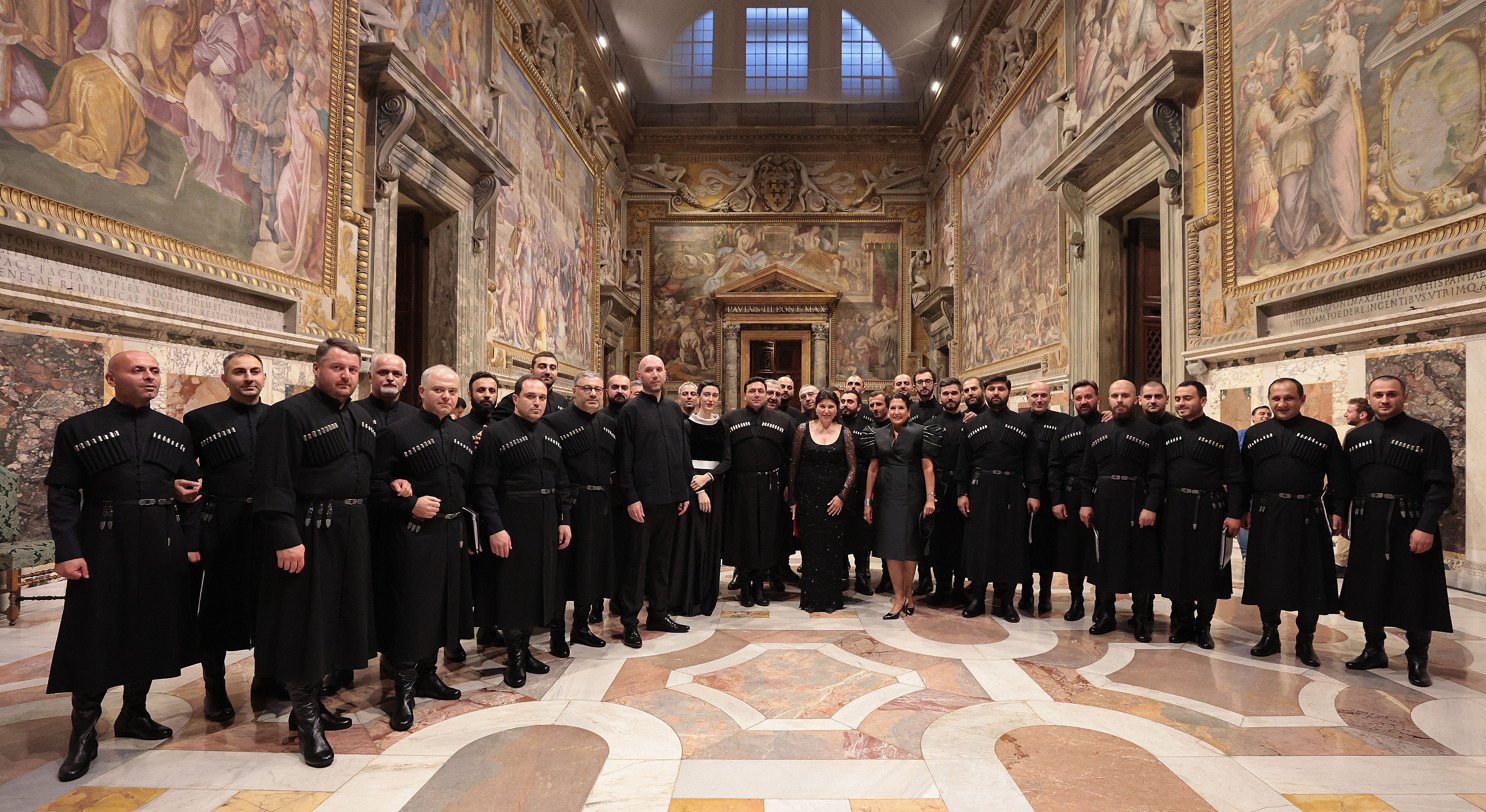
Georgian choir singers dressed in chokha at the Sistine Chapel.

Georgia has a long-established tradition of polyphonic singing, often regarded as one of the earliest polyphonic cultures in the Christian world. The country’s folk repertoire is usually divided into fifteen or sixteen regional musical dialects. In eastern Georgia (Kartli, Kakheti, Mtiuleti) table songs typically feature a sustained drone in the bass with two ornamented upper voices; the best-known example is "Chakrulo". Western regions (Imereti, Svaneti, Racha, Mingrelia, Guria, Adjara) preserve various forms of contrapuntal polyphony. Gurian singing is noted for its highly developed three- and four-part textures and the characteristic Krimanchuli, a local variety of yodeling.

The origins of Georgian polyphony are generally considered pre-Christian. Common features include ostinato patterns, drone techniques and the use of sharp dissonances. Dimitri Arakishvili identified the characteristic C–F–G sonority as the "Georgian Triad". Georgian polyphonic singing was among the first on the list of Masterpieces of the Oral and Intangible Heritage of Humanity in 2001. Georgian polyphonic singing was relisted on the Representative List of the Intangible Cultural Heritage of Humanity in 2008. It was inscribed on the Intangible Cultural Heritage of Georgia registry in 2011.

Georgian scale systems often rely on combinations of perfect fourths and fifths, producing interval structures that diverge from Western equal temperament. Non-tempered intonation has survived most consistently in Svaneti.

From early gramophone recordings preserved by Anzor Erkomaishvili to the emergence of large Soviet-era choirs and postwar ensembles such as Rustavi and Georgian Voices, Georgian polyphony has gained international visibility. From the 1960s onward, groups like Orera, and later The Shin, incorporated traditional material into popular and jazz-influenced idioms.

Research on Georgian traditional music has been shaped by scholars including Dimitri Arakishvili, Zakaria Paliashvili, and later ethnomusicologists. Important contributions by foreign researchers such as Siegfried Nadel have also influenced the field. The establishment of the International Research Centre for Traditional Polyphony in 2003 reinforced Georgia’s role in international polyphony studies.

=== Dance ===
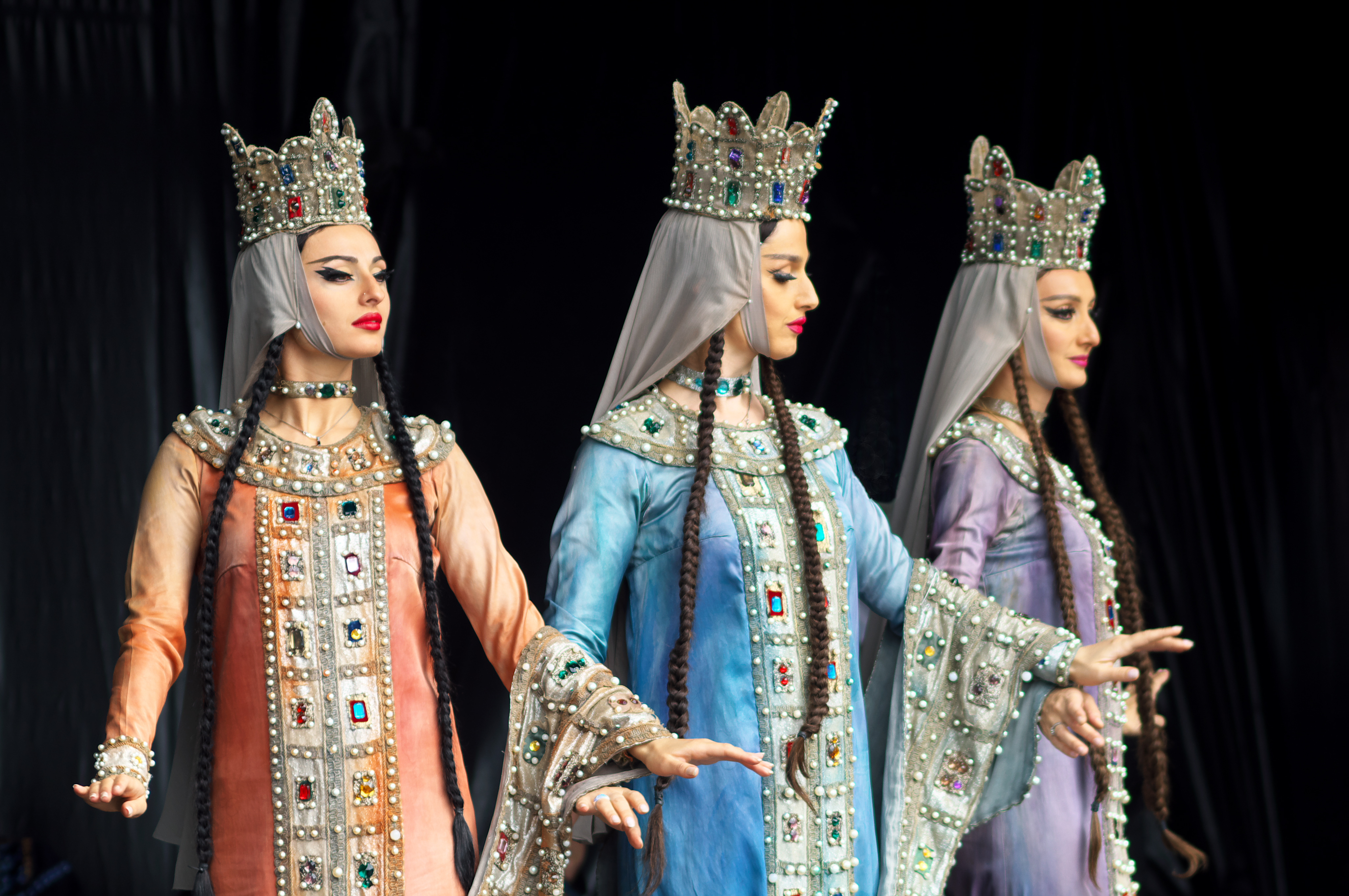
Samaia, a Georgian folk dance, is performed by three women and is a representation of Queen Tamar and her glory.

The folk dances of the Georgian people have an ancient history, as evidenced by numerous historical sources and archaeological findings.

Georgian tribes inhabited the eastern part of the Black Sea coast several centuries before the adoption of Christianity. The works of the ancient Greek geographer Strabo contain vivid descriptions of the pagan rituals of the Georgians, which included elements of dance. The arrival of Christianity introduced significant changes into the life of the population; however, many rituals were preserved and adapted to the new religion. Within these rituals, dance gradually assumed a leading role, while the religious content diminished. In this way, Georgian dances developed into an integral element of folk artistic culture.

It is known that by the 4th century BCE, secular music was widespread among Georgian tribes. The Colchian tribes began their battles with martial songs and dances.

During the medieval period, dance became increasingly professionalized, and performances were frequently held in the palaces of kings and feudal lords. At this time, solo and paired dances underwent significant development, and canonical dance movements became firmly established.

Georgian dance employs several means of self-expression. Young men seek to demonstrate strength, agility, and bravery. Male choreography is characterized by sharp and vigorous movements, including turns, leaps, jumps, and steps performed on the toes or knees. In contrast, the female dance is distinguished by smoothness and grace.

=== Literature ===
A 12th-century epic poem, The Knight in the Panther's Skin by Shota Rustaveli was written in Middle Georgian.

The earliest known Georgian literary work, The Martyrdom of the Holy Queen Shushanik by Iakob Tsurtaveli, was composed between 476 and 484 CE. It belongs to the genre of hagiographies.

In the 9th and 10th centuries, Christian theological literature flourished alongside a growing sense of Georgian national identity, exemplified by "Praise and Exaltation of the Georgian Language" by John Zosimus.

David IV's unification of Georgia in the 11th century marked a golden age for culture. Byzantine-influenced Christian literature thrived, and secular literature emerged, drawing on Georgian folklore as well as Persian and Arabic traditions. Heroic epics, love tales, and knightly adventures became prominent, with poetry as the dominant form.

The reign of Queen Tamar (AD 1184–1213) marked an important stage of medieval Georgian literature. This period witnessed a flourishing of literary production, with Shota Rustaveli's epic poem, "The Knight in the Panther's Skin" (Vepkhistqaosani), emerging as a masterpiece. A chivalric romance, it is considered one of the most significant works of Georgian literature, the poem narrates the adventures of Avtandil, a knight sent by Queen Tinatin on a quest to find another mysterious knight. The story unfolds with twists, culminating in a double wedding.

Following Queen Tamar's reign, Georgia's political fragmentation and foreign invasions led to a decline in literary output.

The 17th and 18th centuries saw a resurgence in literary activity. Kings like Teimuraz I and Archil II contributed to the field. This period produced notable works like The Book of Wisdom and Lies by Sulkhan-Saba Orbeliani, alongside works by David Guramishvili and Bessarion Gabashvili.

In the 19th century, Romanticism dominated Georgian literature under Alexander Chavchavadze, Grigol Orbeliani, and Nikoloz Baratashvili. The following generation, influenced by the "Tergdaleulebi" movement, emphasized realism and social issues, with writers such as Ilia Chavchavadze, Akaki Tsereteli, Alexander Kazbegi, and Vazha-Pshavela.

In the early 20th century, Kutaisi became a center for the symbolist "Blue Horns" group, including Paolo Iashvili, Grigol Robakidze, Giorgi Leonidze, Titsian Tabidze and Galaktion Tabidze.

This vibrant literary activity was interrupted by the Stalinist purges of the 1930s, which silenced many writers who were unwilling to conform to socialist realism.

Prominent 20th-century prose writers include Mikheil Javakhishvili, Konstantine Gamsakhurdia, Nodar Dumbadze, and Otar Chiladze.

== Geographic subdivisions and subethnic groups ==
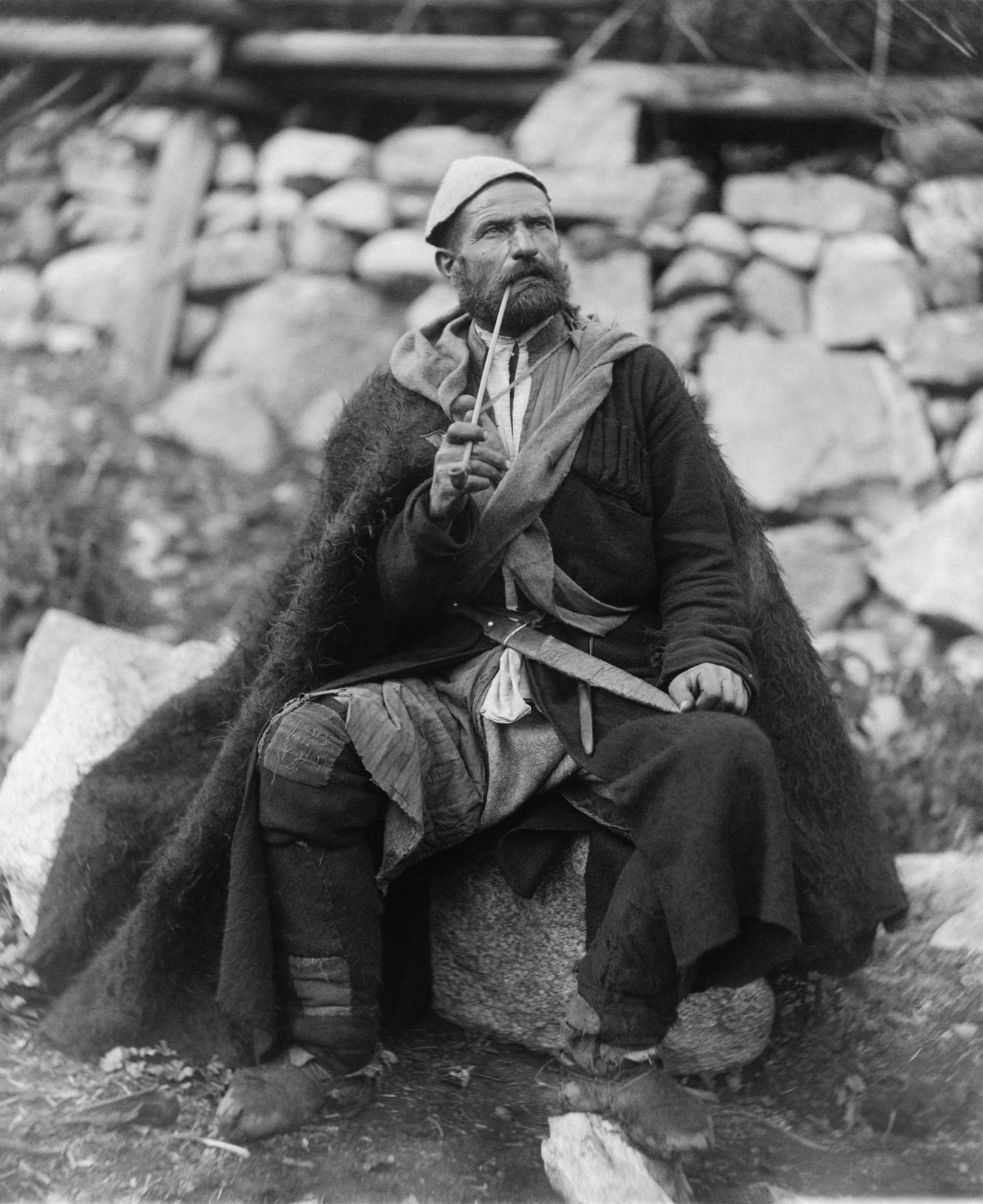
Svan peasant in Mestia, c. 1888.

=== Geographical subdivisions ===
The Georgians have historically been classified into various subgroups based on the geographic region which their ancestors traditionally inhabited.

Even if a member of any of these subgroups moves to a different region, they will still be known by the name of their ancestral region. For example, if a Gurian moves to Tbilisi (part of the Kartli region) he will not automatically identify himself as Kartlian despite actually living in Kartli. This may, however, change if substantial amount of time passes. For example, there are some Mingrelians who have lived in the Imereti region for centuries and are now identified as Imeretian or Imeretian-Mingrelians.

Last names from mountainous eastern Georgian provinces (such as Khevsureti, etc.) can be distinguished by the suffix –uri (ური), or –uli (ული). Most Svan last names typically end in –ani (ანი), Mingrelian in –ia (ია), -ua (უა), or -ava (ავა), and Laz in –shi (ში).

Name	Name in Georgian	Geographical region	Dialect or Language
Adjarians	აჭარელი achareli	Adjara	Adjarian dialect
Gurians	გურული guruli	Guria	Gurian dialect
Imeretians	იმერელი imereli	Imereti	Imeretian dialect
Javakhians	ჯავახი javakhi	Javakheti	Javakhian dialect
Kakhetians	კახელი kakheli	Kakheti	Kakhetian dialect
Kartlians	ქართლელი kartleli	Kartli	Kartlian dialect
Khevsurians	ხევსური khevsuri	Khevsureti	Khevsurian dialect
Lechkhumians	ლეჩხუმელი lechkhumeli	Lechkhumi	Lechkhumian dialect
Mingrelians	მეგრელი megreli	Samegrelo	Mingrelian language
Meskhetians	მესხი meskhi	Meskheti (Samtskhe)	Meskhian dialect
Mokhevians	მოხევე mokheve	Khevi	Mokhevian dialect
Mtiuletians	მთიული mtiuli	Mtiuleti	Mtiuletian-Gudamaqrian dialect
Pshavians	ფშაველი pshaveli	Pshavi	Pshavian dialect
Rachians	რაჭველი rachveli	Racha	Rachan dialect
Svans	სვანი svani	Svaneti	Svan language
Tushs	თუში tushi	Tusheti	Tushetian dialect

The 1897 Russian census (which accounted people by language), had Imeretian, Svan and Mingrelian languages separate from Georgian. During the 1926 Soviet census, Svans and Mingrelians were accounted separately from Georgian. Svan and Mingrelian languages are both Kartvelian languages and are closely related to the national Georgian language.

==== Outside modern Georgia ====
Laz people also may be considered Georgian based on their geographic location and religion. According to the London School of Economics' anthropologist Mathijs Pelkmans, Lazs residing in Georgia frequently identify themselves as "first-class Georgians" to show pride, while considering their Muslim counterparts in Turkey as "Turkified Lazs".

Subethnic groups	Georgian name	Settlement area	Language (dialect)	Number	Difference(s) from mainstream Georgians (other than location)
Laz people	ლაზი lazi	Lazeti (Turkey)	Laz language	250,000	Religion: Muslim majority, Orthodox minority
Fereydani	ფერეიდნელი pereidneli	Fereydan (Iran)	Fereydanian dialect	100,000+	Religion: Muslim
Chveneburi	ჩვენებური chveneburi	Black Sea Region (Turkey)	Georgian language	91,000–1,000,000	Religion: Muslim
Ingiloy people	ინგილო ingilo	Saingilo (Azerbaijan)	Ingiloan dialect	12,000	Religion: Muslim majority, Orthodox minority
Imerkhevians (Shavshians)	შავში shavshi	Shavsheti (Turkey)	Imerkhevian dialect		Religion: Muslim

==== Extinct Georgian subdivisions ====
Throughout history Georgia also has extinct Georgian subdivisions.

Name	Name in Georgian	Geographical location	Dialect or language
Dvals	დვალი dvali	Georgia (Racha and Khevi regions) and Russia (North Ossetia)	Dval language

== See also ==
- List of Georgians
- Demographics of Georgia (country)
- Georgian Americans
- Peoples of the Caucasus

== Bibliography ==
- Asatiani, Nodar (2009). History of Georgia. Tbilisi: Publishing House Petite. ISBN 978-9941-9063-6-7.
- Stephen H. Rapp Jr.; P. Crego (2018). Languages and Cultures of Eastern Christianity: Georgian. Taylor & Francis. ISBN 9781351923262.
- Allen, W.E.D. (1970). Russian Embassies to the Georgian Kings, 1589–1605. Hakluyt Society. ISBN 978-1-4094-4599-9.
- Burney, Charles; Lang, David Marshall (2001). The Peoples of the Hills - Ancient Ararat and Caucasus. London: Phoenix Press. ISBN 1 84212 252 5.
- Eastmond, Anthony (2010). Royal Imagery in Medieval Georgia. Penn State Press.
- Dalby, A. (2002). Language in Danger; The Loss of Linguistic Diversity and the Threat to Our Future. Columbia University Press. ISBN 9780231129008.
- Suny, Ronald Grigor (1994). The Making of the Georgian Nation. Indiana University Press. ISBN 978-0253209153.
- Nana Bolashvili; Andreas Dittmann; Lorenz King; Vazha Neidze (2018). National Atlas of Georgia. Steiner Verlag. p. 138. ISBN 978-3-515-12057-9.
- Mikaberidze, Alexander (2015). Historical Dictionary of Georgia (2nd ed.). Rowman & Littlefield. ISBN 978-1-4422-4146-6.
- Lang, David Marshall (1966). The Georgians. Thames & Hudson.
- Fisher, William Bayne; Avery, P.; Hambly, G. R. G.; Melville, C. (1991). The Cambridge History of Iran. Vol. 7. Cambridge: Cambridge University Press. ISBN 978-0-521-20095-0.
- Rayfield, Donald (2013). Edge of Empires: A History of Georgia. Reaktion Books. ISBN 978-1789140590.
- Rapp, Stephen H. Jr. (2016). The Sasanian World Through Georgian Eyes, Caucasia and the Iranian Commonwealth in Late Antique Georgian Literature. Routledge.
- Toumanoff, Cyril (1963). Studies in Christian Caucasian History. Georgetown University Press.
- Mariam Lortkipanidze; Otar Japaridze; David Muskhelishvili; Roin Metreveli (2012). History of Georgia in four volumes, vol. II - History of Georgia from the 4th century to the 13th century. Tbilisi: National Academy of Sciences of Georgia. ISBN 978-9941-19-585-3.
- David Braund (1994). Georgia in Antiquity: A History of Colchis and Transcaucasian Iberia, 550 BC–AD 562. Oxford: Clarendon Press. ISBN 0-19-814473-3.
- Javrishvili, David L. (1958). Georgian Folk Dances. Tbilisi: State Publishing House "Sabchota Sakartvelo".
