= Alaverdi =

Alaverdi or Allaverdy may refer to:

- Alaverdi (expression), a word used during Georgian supra
- Alaverdi, Armenia, a town in the province of Lori, Armenia
- Alaverdi Monastery, a Georgian Eastern Orthodox monastery in the region of Kakheti, Georgia (country)
- HMCS Allaverdy (Fy 06), a patrol boat in the Royal Canadian Navy

== See also ==
- Alivardi Khan (1671–1756), Nawab of Bengal, 1740–1756
- Allahverdi (disambiguation)
