= Armenian Encyclopedia Publishing House =

Publishing house in Yerevan, Armenia

The Armenian Encyclopedia Publishing House (Armenian: «Հայկական հանրագիտարան» հրատարակչություն, romanized: «Haykakan hanragitaran» hratarakch'ut'yun), formerly the main editorial office of the Armenian Encyclopedia (Armenian: Հայկական հանրագիտարանի գլխավոր խմբագրություն, romanized: Haykakan hanragitarani glkhavor khmbagrut'yun) is a publishing house in Yerevan that was established in 1967 and published the Armenian Soviet Encyclopedia in 1974–1986 and other encyclopedias in Armenian language later.

It was founded as a department of the Institute of History of the Armenian Academy of Sciences under the presidency of Viktor Hambardzumyan.

The AE publishing house also edited a children's encyclopedia, Who is it? What is it? (Armenian: Ո՞վ է, Ի՞նչ է) in 4 volumes (1984–87), the Russian-Armenian Polytechnical Dictionary (1988) and a Traveler's Encyclopedia (1990).

Since Armenian independence (1991) publications include titles on topics of such current-day issues such as the first Nagorno-Karabakh War, the Armenian Question and the Armenian diaspora.

== Heads ==
- Viktor Hambardzumyan (1967—1974)
- Abel Simonyan (1974—1979)
- Makich Arzumanyan (1979—1988)
- Konstantin Khudaverdyan (1988—1999)
- Hovhannes Aivazyan (since 1999)

== Creative Commons licensing ==
On 30 September 2011, the owner of "Armenian Encyclopedia" Publishing House SNCO and "School of Information Technologies" Foundation signed a cooperation agreement, which allowed the content of a number of Armenian encyclopedias to be in open circulation on the basis of Creative Commons BY-SA 3.0 or higher licenses used in Wikimedia projects. The following encyclopedias are subject to this contract:

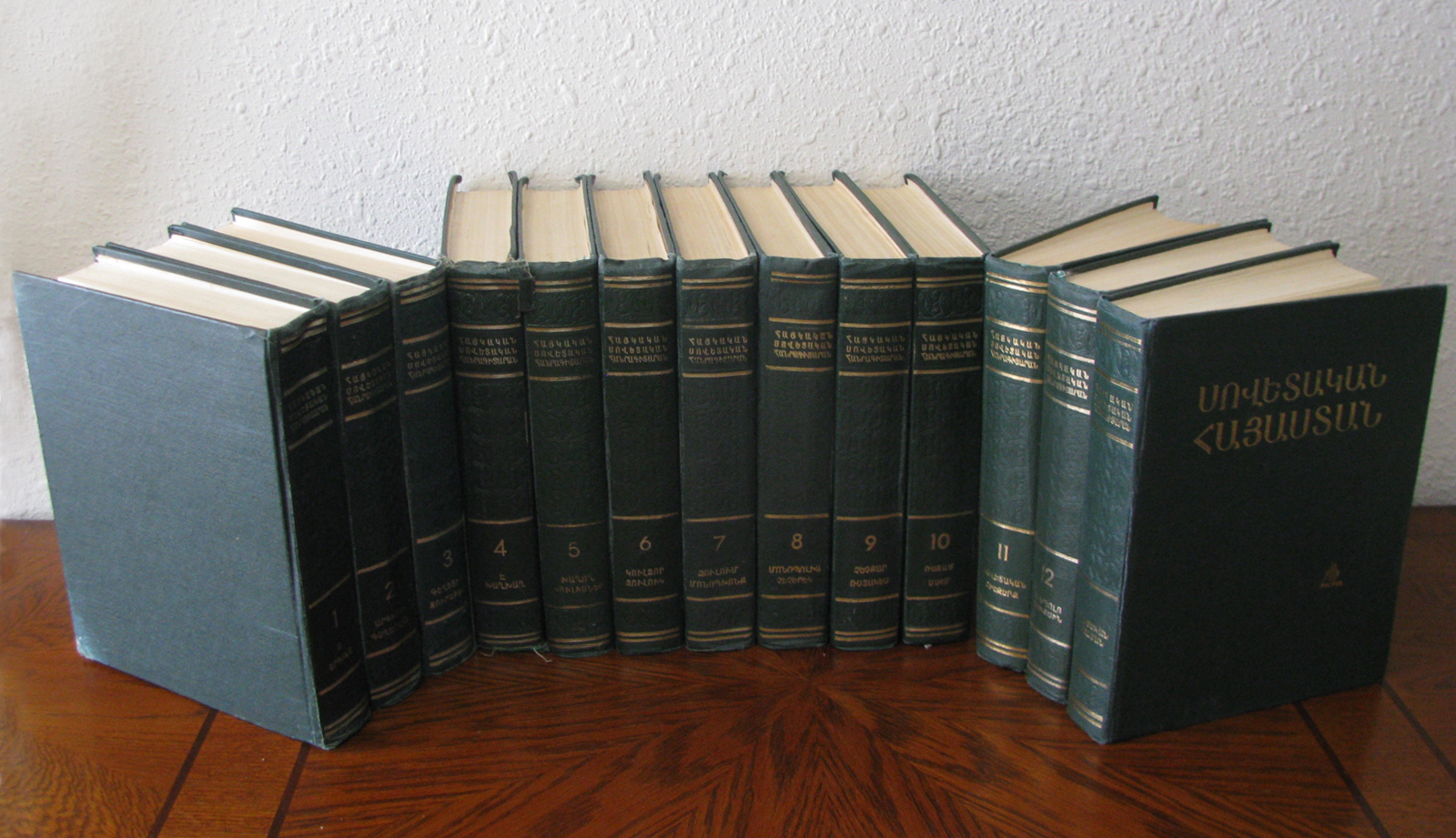
The twelve volume set of the Soviet Armenian Encyclopedia and the supplementary volume, Soviet Armenia.

- Armenian Soviet Encyclopedia, 13 volumes, ch. ed. 1974-1987
- Armenian Concise Encyclopedia, 4 volumes, chapter editor, 1990-2003
- Armenian Question, 1 volume, head of the Armenian Encyclopedia ed. 1996
- Nature of Armenia, Armenian Encyclopedia ed. 2006
- Who is who? Armenian biographical encyclopedia, 2 volumes, Armenian Encyclopedia ed. 2005-2007
- Karabakh Liberation War 1988-1994 encyclopedia, Armenian Encyclopedia ed. 2004
- Great School Encyclopedia, 4 volumes, Armenian Encyclopedia ed. 2008-2010
- Armenian Diaspora Encyclopedia, 1 volume, Armenian Encyclopedia ed. 2003
- Armenian Diaspora Encyclopedia 2003 (djvu, Wikisource)
- Christian Armenia Encyclopedia, 1 volume, Chapter of the Armenian Encyclopedia. ed. 2002
- Christian Armenia Encyclopedia 2002 (djvu, Wikisource)

== Series ==
Name	Year	Volumes
Armenian Concise Encyclopedia	1990–2003	4
A children's encyclopedia Voskeporik (Golden Belly)	1993–1999	3
The Armenian Question	1996	1
Armenian Diaspora Organisations	2001	1
The Armenian Church. Hierarchical Sees and Dioceses	2001	1
Christian Armenia Encyclopedia	2002	1
The War of Karabakh. 1988–1994	2005	1
Family Encyclopedia Series	1997–	3

== See also ==
- Great Soviet Encyclopedia
