= Alaverdi (expression) =

Georgian expression related to toasting

Alaverdi (Georgian: ალავერდი) is a Georgian expression and practice related to the tradition of ritualized toasting at a supra (feast). It can refer to a competitive toasting round or a directive from the toastmaster (tamada) to the next speaker.

== Etymology ==
The term is derived from Turkish and means "if God will".

== Usage and function ==
The use of alaverdi is a key element in managing the structure and flow of a Georgian supra.

=== As a toast competition ===
Alaverdi can be a ritualized toast competition among the men at the table. The tamada begins by proposing a toast on a specific topic. Other men must then modify and elaborate on this topic in subsequent toasts. The tamada symbolically grants his power of speech to another participant, who becomes the temporary tamada and the center of attention.

In formal contexts, the competition is to determine "who is the best" speaker. The head tamada judges the winner of a round based on the toast's originality, formulation, and the approval it received from the table. The winner is then given the right to speak second in the following round. In informal settings, the basic structure of alternation is followed without the direct competition.

=== To manage drinking order ===
A tamada can use the expression alaverdi to directly control the order of drinking. By saying to someone, ალავერდი შენთანა ვარ alaverdi, shentana var ("I am alaverdi with you"), the tamada designates that person to deliver their toast and drink immediately after him.

This is often done for specific reasons:

- When a toast is particularly special to an individual at the table, giving them the opportunity to speak first. For example, if the toast is to a guest, the tamada might call on the person who invited the guest to be alaverdi so they can provide more context for the others.
- To draw a person who has become withdrawn or stopped participating back into the group. This action forces the person to speak and rejoin the activity, which is done for the "unity of the table".

== Social context ==
The practice of alaverdi is closely tied to concepts of masculinity in Georgian culture. Table rhetoric is considered an important sign of masculinity, and men who cannot participate are considered "unmanly". The power of words demonstrated during the competition is seen as a sign of masculinity.

== See also ==
- Georgian culture

== Sources ==
- Holisky, Dee Ann (1989). "The rules of the supra or how to drink in Georgian". The Annual of the Society for the Study of Caucasia. 1: 22–40.
- Kotthoff, Helga (1995). "The social semiotics of Georgian toast performances: Oral genre as cultural activity". Journal of Pragmatics. 24 (4): 353–380. doi:10.1016/0378-2166(94)00063-K.
