= Allahverdiyev =

Allahverdiyev (masculine, Azerbaijani: Allahverdiyev) or Allahverdiyeva (feminine, Azerbaijani: Allahverdiyeva) is a Russian language-influenced patronymic surname derived from the given name Allahverdi with the Russian patronymic suffix '-ev'. Notable people with the surname include:

- Aladdin Allahverdiyev (born 1947), Azerbaijani scientist
- Ayan Allahverdiyeva (born 2005), Azerbaijani chess player
- Elnur Allahverdiyev (born 1983), Azerbaijani footballer
- Elnur M. Allahverdiyev (born 1978), Member of the National Assembly of Azerbaijan
- Jalal Allakhverdiyev (1929–2017), Azerbaijani mathematician
- Mahaddin Allahverdiyev (born 1962), Soviet Azerbaijani sport wrestler
- Museyib Allahverdiyev (1909–1979), Soviet Army officer
- Rafael Allahverdiyev (1945–2009), Azerbaijani politician

== See also ==
- Alaverdyan
