= Tamada =

Toastmaster of a Georgian supra or feast

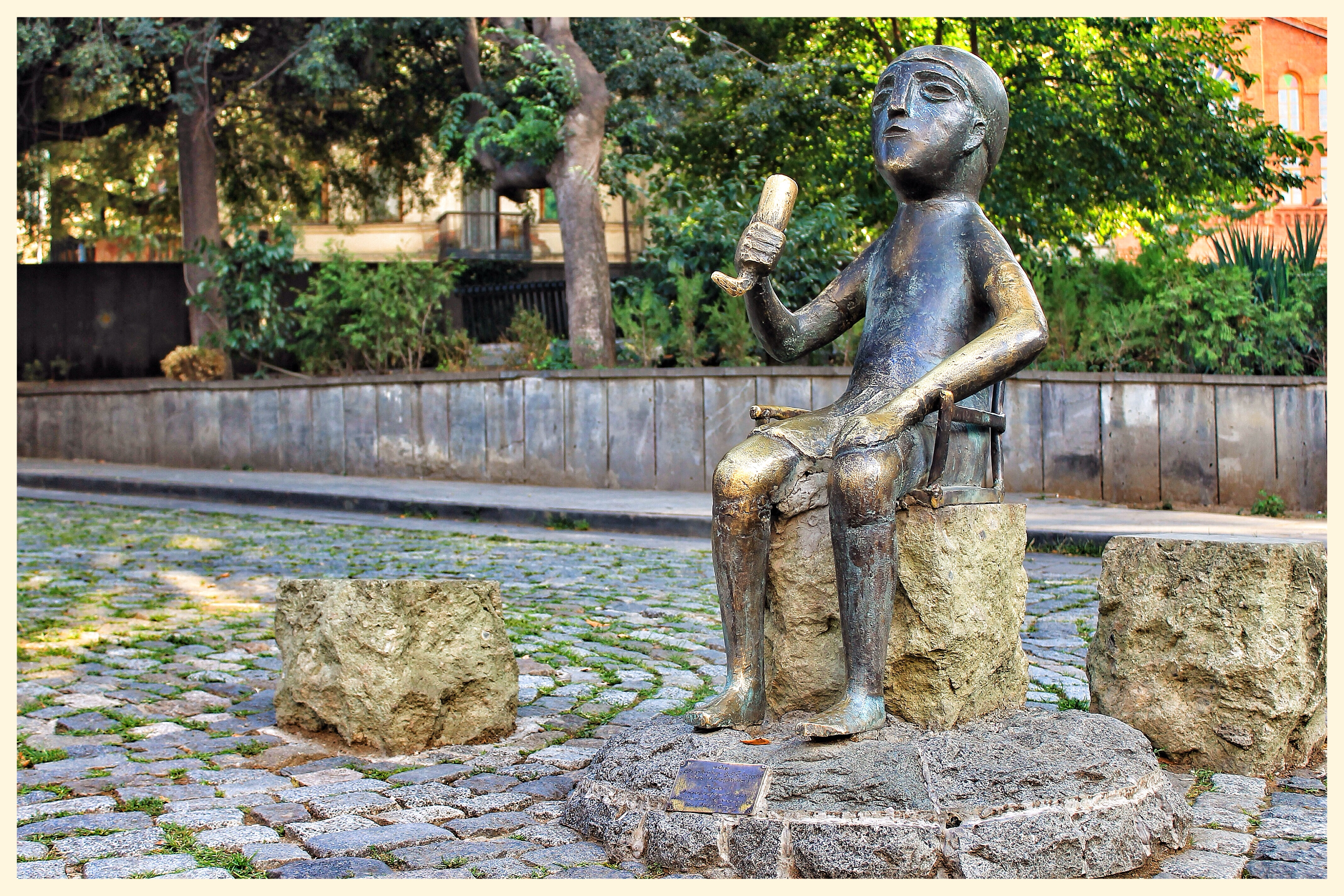
The sculpture of a man holding a horn in Tbilisi modeled on an ancient Colchian statuette affectionately monikered as "tamada".

A tamada (Georgian: თამადა) is a Georgian toastmaster at a Georgian supra (feast) or at a wedding, corresponding to the symposiarch at the Greek symposion or to the thyle at the Anglo-Saxon sumbel.

All supras, regardless of size, feature a tamada, or toastmaster: one person who introduces each toast. Georgians like to say that the tamada is dictator of the table, but it would be more appropriate to compare him to a leader or even to a teacher. Tamada traditionally ought to be eloquent, intelligent, smart, sharp-witted and quick−thinking, with a good sense of humor − since very often some of the guests might try to compete with him on the toast-making. At the Georgian table, a tamada is considered to help bridge the gap between past, present and future, toasting ancestors and descendants as well as the other guests at the table. A toast can be proposed only by a tamada; the rest are to develop the idea. Some toasts take a traditional form; for example, for some toasts all men have to stand up and drink wine in silence. In many cases, however, the guests vie to say something more original and emotional than the previous speaker, and the whole process grows into a sort of oratory contest.

Historically, the tamada had more control over the table than he does today. For example, members of the supra were supposed to ask permission before leaving the table and the party. If they got the permission they could be toasted by the tamada and other members before leaving. If the first toast is to the tamada, it is proposed by someone else, generally by the host, who proposes the nomination of the tamada.

== Choosing a tamada ==
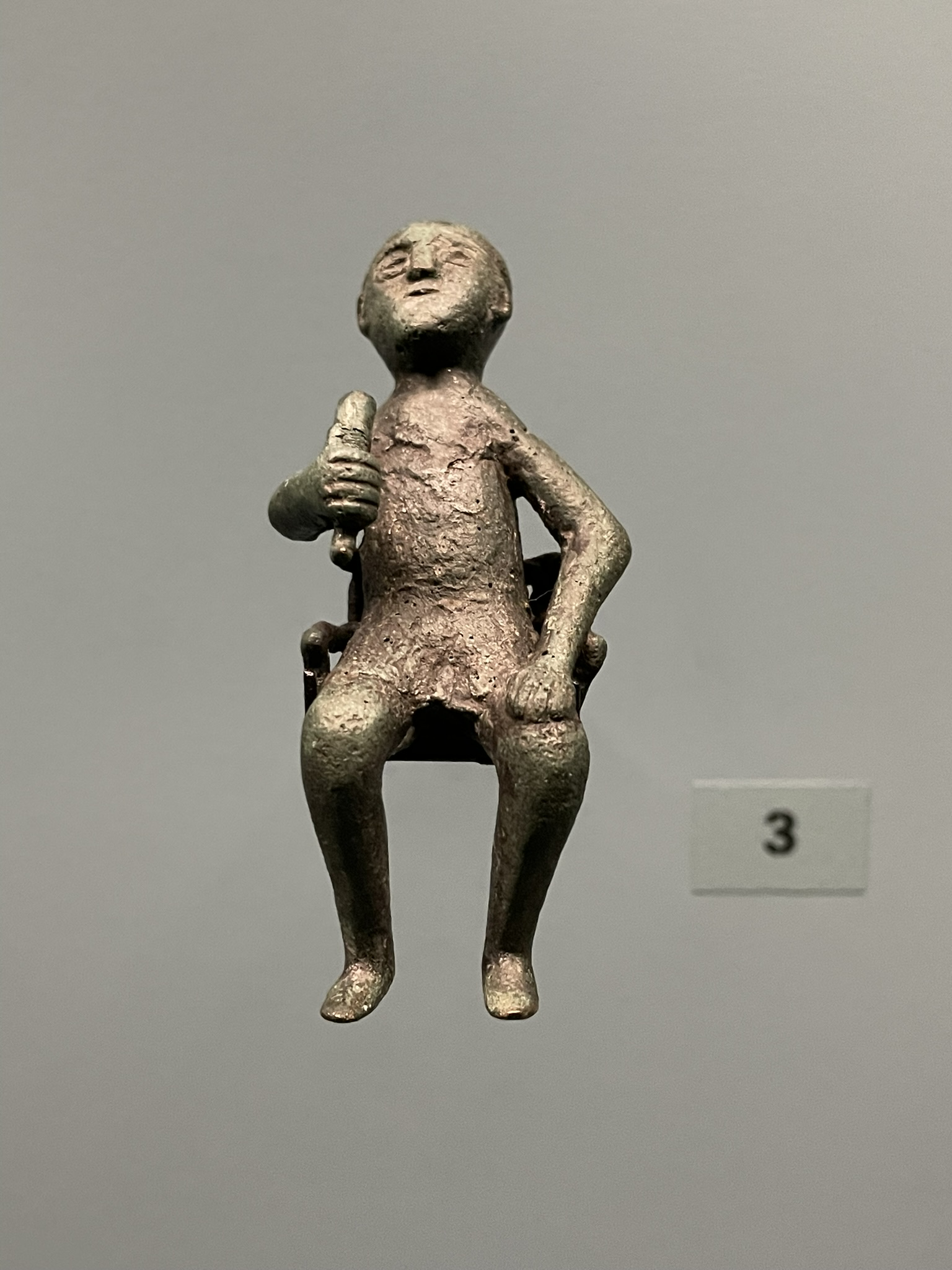
Bronze statue from the 7th century BC discovered during archaeological excavations in the city of Vani. This statue is the statue of a Tamada, a toastmaster.

If the supra is very small, in someone's home with only a few guests, the role of tamada won't be specially assigned, but rather simply assumed by the head of the household. At very large occasions, such as wedding or funeral banquets, the tamada is chosen in advance by the family, who ask a relative or friend who is known to be a good tamada to lead the supra. At mid-size occasions, however, the people of the table themselves choose the tamada.

The choice depends on several factors. There may be a senior person at the table to whom the role naturally falls. In some groups there will be one man who regularly is the tamada because he enjoys it and is good at it. Sometimes groups of friends who gather frequently will rotate the responsibility of being tamada. In many cases, when it comes time to choose, one person – often the oldest member of the table – will propose a candidate for tamada by saying something like, “Kote should be our tamada, shouldn't he?”. Others express agreement and, if Kote raises no serious objections, the person who first suggested the choice raises his glass and proposes the first toast to the tamada – “Kotes Gaumarjos” (to Kote). The supra participants do the same. The newly toasted tamada initiates new toasts from then on.

If the candidate refuses to be tamada, then the people at the table propose someone else as tamada, until someone at the table agrees to be tamada, and the first toast is drunk to him.

If the tamada has been chosen in advance by the family, the senior member of the family will initiate the drinking by proposing the first toast to the tamada directly, without any preceding discussion. Following the proposal of this first toast, each member of the supra toasts the tamada with a fixed phrase or two and drinks his glass. On this toast people drink quite quickly, almost in unison, and without any verbal elaboration on the theme of the toast. Some frequently heard phrases on this first toast include “Kotes Gaumarjos” (to Kote), where Kote is the name of the person who will be tamada, or “Kargad chaatarebinos es supra” ("May he lead this supra well”, or “May he cause us to have a good time”).

There is only one common circumstance where the first toast is not to the tamada, and that concerns usually small, less formal supras where the host himself is tamada. In that case, the host simply assumes the role, as noted above, and proposes the first toast to a particular theme (discussed below).

== Qualities of a good tamada ==
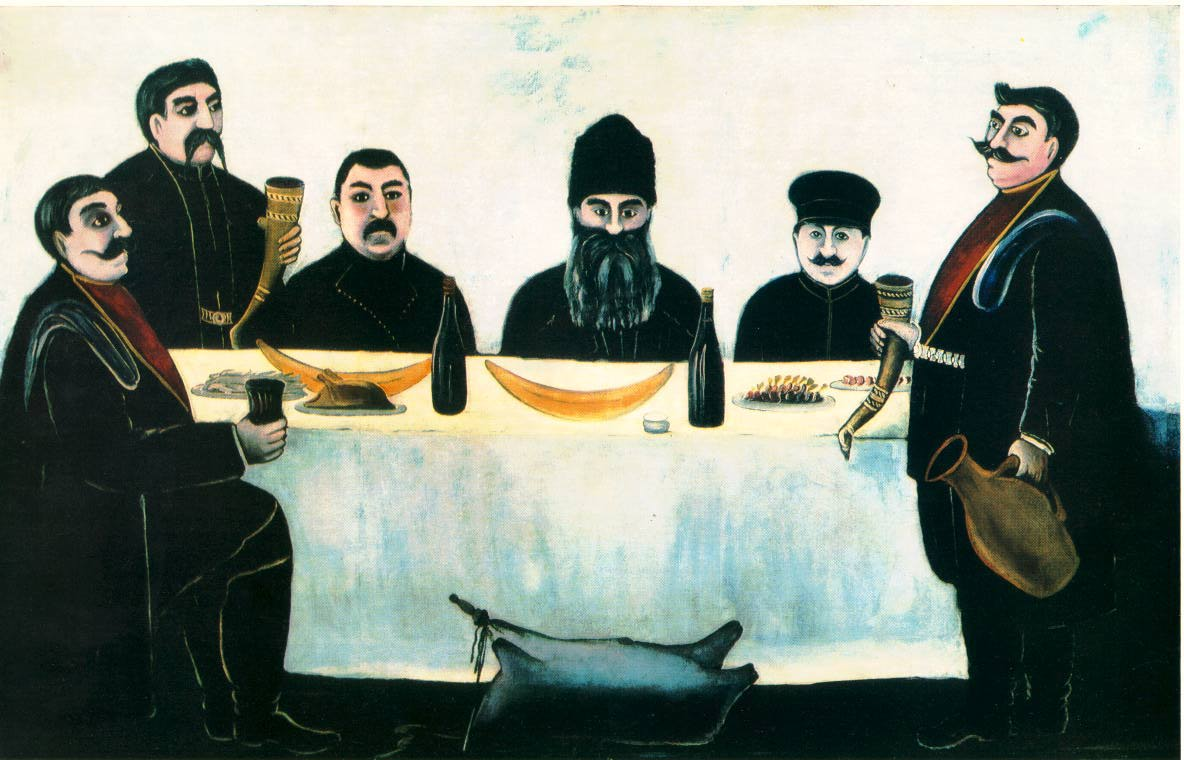
Begos' friends by Niko Pirosmani. A tamada holding a kantsi (horn) and introducing a toast at a keipi (festive supra)

A good tamada is selected for his possession of a number of special qualities. First of all, a good tamada is one who is good with words, who speaks clearly and cleverly, who can say in an original way things which are heard over and over again at every supra. The best tamadas are extemporaneous poets.

Secondly, a good tamada must be able to organize well, as he is almost entirely in charge of the entertainment. He has to decide which toasts to drink when, and how often to propose new toasts, so that a good rhythm is established. He has to orchestrate singing or dancing, if there is such, between stretches of toasting, so people stay attentive and entertained. This relates closely to a third quality of a good tamada: sensitivity. The tamada should have a good feel for the mood of the table and try to maintain a pleasant upbeat atmosphere in which all members are participating. The table should have a kind of unity, said one Georgian, which is the responsibility of the tamada. He should notice if certain members begin to pay less attention and draw them back, perhaps with a special toast or by making them “alaverdi”.

He should be able to sense how much people have drunk, and increase or decrease the pace of the toasting as needed. (In general, the pace of toasting is faster earlier in the evening and slows down once everyone reaches a certain level of inebriation.) Part of this includes recognizing when the guests are at the proper level of inebriation for him to propose more abstract or emotional toasts. If the tamada knows the people at the supra well, he will be able to tailor his toasts to the guests, encouraging them to have a good time.

Fourthly, a good tamada has to be somewhat forceful in order to get people to pay attention to the toasting and to get everyone to drink each toast. This gets harder as the evening wears on and some people would rather talk than toast. Last, but not at all least, a good tamada must also be a good drinker; the tamada is expected to empty his glass on each toast, but it is considered disgraceful for him to actually get drunk.

Both the tamada and the other guests are expected to propose a toast to every person at the Georgian table. Every speaker tries to distinguish the most interesting, original and praiseworthy features of a person toasted. The Georgians do not consider this flattery, but a way to encourage the good traits. They believe when a person is told that he is kind and honest he will find it difficult to do evil; when he is told he is generous he will try not to be greedy.
