= Khudayberdiev =

Khudayberdiev (feminine: Khudayberdieva) and variants is a Russian-language-style patronymic surname derived from the given name Khudaiberdi/Khudaberdi/Khudaverdi composed from Persian khuda, "lord", "god" (loaned in some other languages) and Turkcic verdi/berdi, "he gave", i.e., meaning "given by God", similar to Allahverdiyev, etc. The native form of the patronymic is Qudayberdiuli and variants (Khudayberdi + patronymmic suffix -uli, -ogly, etc.)

Notable people with the surname include:

- Abibilla Kudayberdiev
- Elizaveta Khudaiberdieva
- Halima Xudoyberdiyeva
- Jakhongir Khudayberdiev
- Mahmud Khudoiberdiyev
- Serdar Hudaýberdiýew
- Shakarim Qudayberdiuli
- Shamsiddin Khudoyberdiev
- Xushnud Xudayberdiyev

== See also ==
- Khudaverdiyev
