= Keipi =

A keipi (Georgian: ქეიფი) or festivity supra is a traditional banquet feast in Georgia.

== History ==
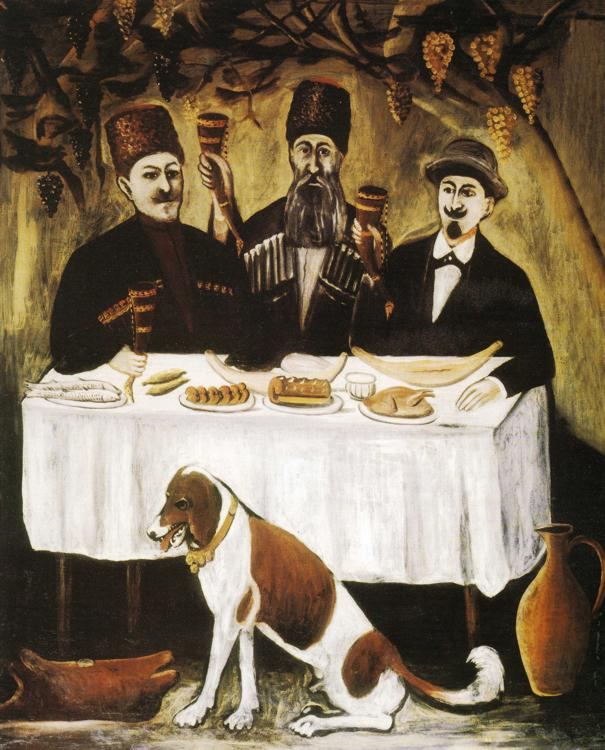
"The keipi of three noblemen", by the Georgian naïve artist Pirosmani.

In ancient Georgia, a keipi would be held in the spring for all the village to attend. The women of the village would ensure that the food was constantly replenished as a tamada, or toastmaster, gives a toast. Tradition dictates that no participant could touch their wine bowl until the toast was finished.

== Rules and habits ==
In his book, Vintage: The Story of Wine, Hugh Johnson notes that at some keipi there may be 20 or more toasts, with spaces between to ensure that no one gets overly intoxicated since the constant threat of invasion called for everyone in the village to be sober enough to fight. He goes on to mention that "The Georgian custom is to drain the wine bowl, then throw away the last drops. They are the number of your enemies."

A tamada arranges breaks from time to time. The thing is that there are special toasts which according to the ritual should be accompanied by a song or a verse. Songs have always accompanied the Georgians in joy and sorrow, in battle and labour. Old Georgian drinking−songs are melodious, polyphonic and rather complicated. Some of them don't need any accompaniment. The choir of men creates musical background. Modern drinking−songs are usually performed to the accompaniment of the guitar or the piano. Special drinking songs and wedding songs (if it is a wedding party) as well as chants full of humour, sung by guests during the course of the party contest.

If there is enough room at the party you may take part in folk dances. In these dances and at the table men ought to be gentlemen and try to be very polite and respect the ladies. Of course, no songs and dances accepted at “khelehi” (funeral banquets).

== See also ==
- traditional Georgian feast - Supra
- Georgian burial banquet - Kelekhi
