= Alaverdyan =

Alaverdyan, Alaverdian, or Alahverdian is an Armenian patronymic surname. It is derived from the given name Allahverdi, similar to some other surnames introduced in the Russian Empire. Notable people with the surname include:

- Khristofor Alaverdyan (1895–1942) Soviet general
- Larisa Alaverdyan
- Nairuhi Alaverdyan, Azerbaijani Soviet folk singer and dancer
- Natalia Alaverdian, Belgian fashion businesswoman
- Nicholas Alahverdian, American sex offender and child welfare activist
