= Allahverdi =

Allahverdi is a male given name and a surname literally meaning "given by Allah". It is semantically equivalent to the Christian names Theodotus (Greek: Θεόδοτος) and Bogdan. People with this name include:

== Given name ==
- Allah Verdi Mirza Farman Farmaian (1929–2016), Qajar prince
- Allahverdi Afshar, Iranian painter, active from 1815 until after 1825
- Allahverdi Baghirov (1946–1992), Azerbaijani officer, former leader of Azerbaijani Popular Front Party, head coach of FK Qarabağ and National Hero of Azerbaijan
- Allahverdi Dehghani (born 1968), Iranian politician
- Allahverdi Khan (Armenian) (died 1662), Safavid military officer of Armenian origin
- Allahverdi Khan (c. 1560–1613), Iranian general and statesman of Georgian origin

== Surname ==
- Javad Allahverdi, Iranian football player

== See also ==
- Alaverdyan
- Allahverdiyev
- Alaverdi, Armenia
