= Konstantin Khudaverdyan =

Armenian historian

Konstantin Sureni Khudaverdyan (1929, Yerevan – 1999, Yerevan) was an Armenian historian, Doctor of History, Professor (1974), academic of the International Academy of Sciences of Nature and Society. From 1988 to 1999 he was the editor-in-chief of Armenian Soviet Encyclopedia.

== Biography ==
Khudaverdyan finished the Yerevan State University in 1951. From 1974 to 1988 he was the head of Modern public history department of Institute of history of Armenian Academy of Sciences. Khudaverdyan's works are dedicated to the Armenian culture, inter-ethnic relations, Armenian genocide and related issues.

Khudaverdyan is an author of university textbooks, "History of Armenian People" research (8 volumes, co-author), "The Armenian Genocide under the light of decades" (co-author, in Russian, 1995) and other books, over 120 publications.

== Sources ==
- Armenian Concise Encyclopedia, ed. by Konstantin Khudaverdyan, Vol. 2, pp. 539–540
