= Armenian Soviet Encyclopedia =

Armenian language encyclopedia

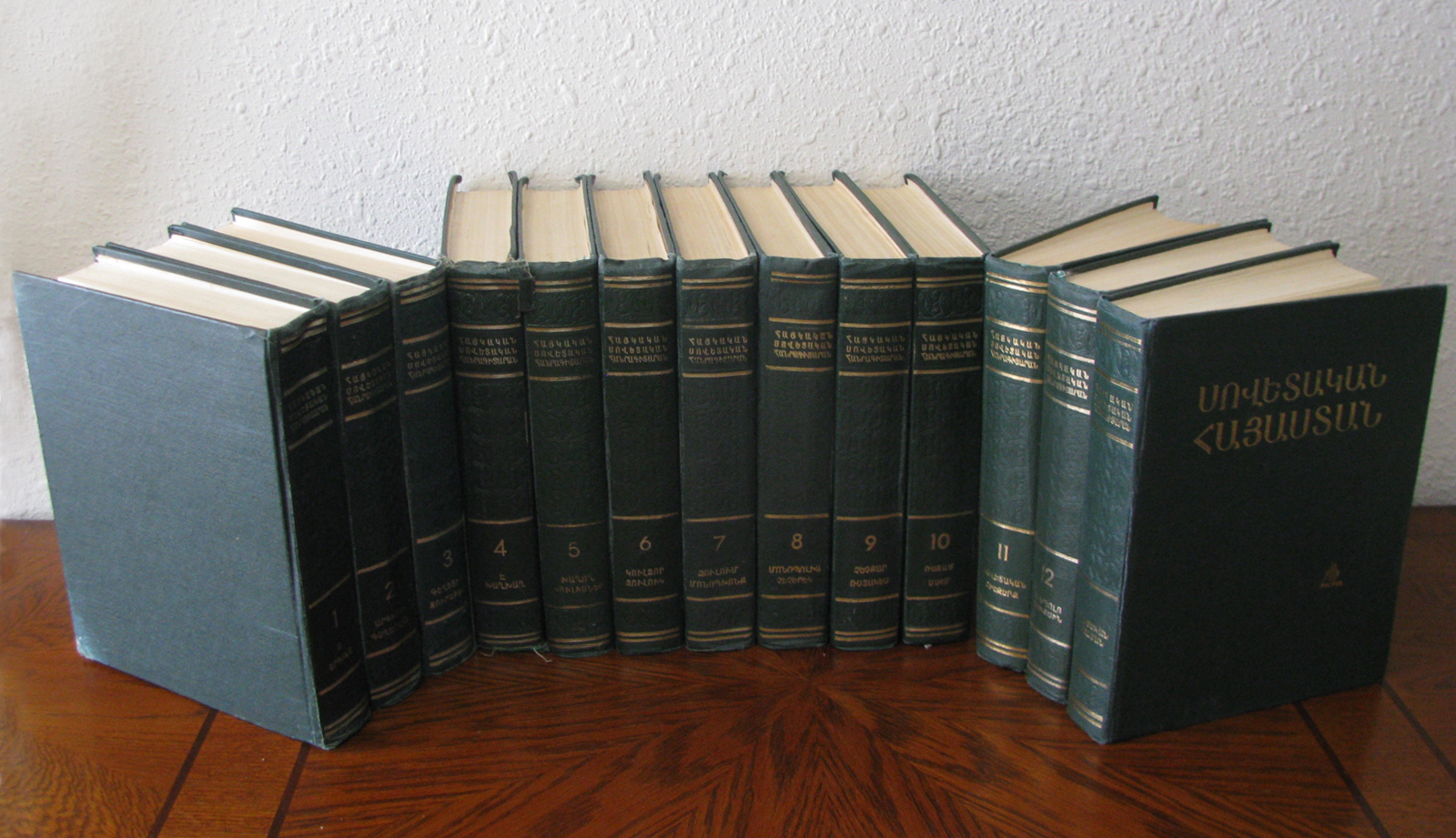
- Set of all Armenian Soviet Encyclopedias published between 1974-1986
- Language: Armenian
- Subject: General
- Genre: Reference encyclopaedia
- Publisher: Armenian Encyclopedia Publishing House
- Publication date: 1974-1987
- Publication place: Armenian SSR; USSR
- OCLC: 10431241

Armenian Soviet Encyclopedia (also rendered Soviet Armenian Encyclopedia; Armenian: Հայկական սովետական հանրագիտարան, Haykakan sovetakan hanragitaran; ASE) is the first general encyclopedia in the Armenian language. It was published in 1974-1987 by the main editorial office of the Armenian Encyclopedia. It consists of 12+1 volumes, published under the direction of the President of the Academy of Sciences of the Armenian SSR Viktor Ambartsumian. In 2011, it was licensed under the Creative Commons BY-SA 3.0 free license.

Although it reflected the government's Marxist–Leninist viewpoint, is in the most comprehensive encyclopedia in the Armenian language to this day. Each volume was published in 100,000 copies.

== History ==
In 1964, the Central Committee of the Communist Party of Armenia issued a resolution on the publication of the Armenian Soviet Encyclopedia. In 1965, the Council of Ministers of the Armenian SSR issued a resolution on the creation of a special editorial office for this purpose.

In 1967, the main editorial board of the Armenian Encyclopedia (now the Armenian Encyclopedia Publishing House) was established. It was created under the auspices of the President of the Academy of Sciences of the Armenian SSR Viktor Ambartsumian.

The ASE was published in 1974-1987, one volume per year. The chairman of the editorial board of the ASE was Viktor Ambartsumian, the chief editors were Viktor Ambartsumian (volume 1), Abel Simonyan (volumes 2-4) and Makich Arzumanyan (volumes 5-13). 7200 authors participated in the creation of the ASE. It was printed by the Hakob Megapart Printing House.

In 2011, the state non-profit Armenian Encyclopedia Publishing House, which owns the rights to the ASE, allowed its distribution under the Creative Commons BY-SA 3.0 free license.

== Structure ==
The ASE consists of 12 main volumes and a supplementary volume about Armenian SSR. It includes 38,767 articles, 15,263 images and 858 maps. The ASE was published using a special encyclopedic font created for it.

Volume	Year	Names	Articles	Pages	Images	Maps	Number of copies
1	1974	Ա-ԱՐԳԻՆԱ	3,442	720	1,294	75	100,000
2	1976	ԱՐԳԻՇՏԻ-ԳԵՂԵՐՎԱՆ	3,503	720	1,798	75	100,000
3	1977	ԳԵՂԵՑԻԿԸ-ԶՈՒՐԱԲՅԱՆ	3,509	720	1,726	53	100,000
4	1978	Է-ԽԱՂԽԱՂ	3,451	720	1,228	53	100,000
5	1979	ԽԱՂՈՂ-ԿՈՒԼԻՍՆԵՐ	3,694	720	1,326	68	100,000
6	1980	ԿՈՒԼԶՈՐ-ՁՈՒԼՈՒԿ	3,108	720	1,097	64	100,000
7	1981	ՁՈՒԼՈՒՄ-ՄՈՆՈՊԽՈՆՔ	3,250	720	1,436	46	100,000
8	1982	ՄՈՆՈՊՈԼԻԱ-ՉԵՉԵՐԵԿ	3,145	720	1,274	70	100,000
9	1983	ՉԵՉՔԱՐ-ՌՍՏԱԿԵՍ	3,185	720	1,046	60	100,000
10	1984	ՌՍՏԱՄ-ՍՍՀՄ	2,009	736	1,065	61	100,000
11	1985	ՍՈՎԵՏԱԿԱՆ-ՏԻԵԶԵՐՔ	2,970	720	958	67	100,000
12	1986	ՏԻԵՊՈԼՈ-ՖՈՒՔՍԻՆ	3,501	752	1,015	96	100,000
TOTAL (1–12)	1974–1986	Ա-ՖՈւՔՍԻՆ	38,767	8,688	15,263	858	1,200,000
13	1987	ՍՈՎԵՏԱԿԱՆ ՀԱՅԱՍՏԱՆ		688			
