= Supra (feast) =

Traditional Georgian feast

A supra (Georgian: სუფრა [supʰɾa]) is a traditional Georgian feast and a part of Georgian social culture. There are two types of supra: a festive supra (ლხინის სუფრა, [lxinis supʰra]), called a keipi; and a sombre supra (ჭირის სუფრა, [tʃʼɪrɪs sʊpʰra]), called a kelekhi, which is always held after burials.

The traditions of supra, as an important part of Georgian social culture, were inscribed on the UNESCO Intangible Cultural Heritage of Georgia list in 2017.

== Etymology ==
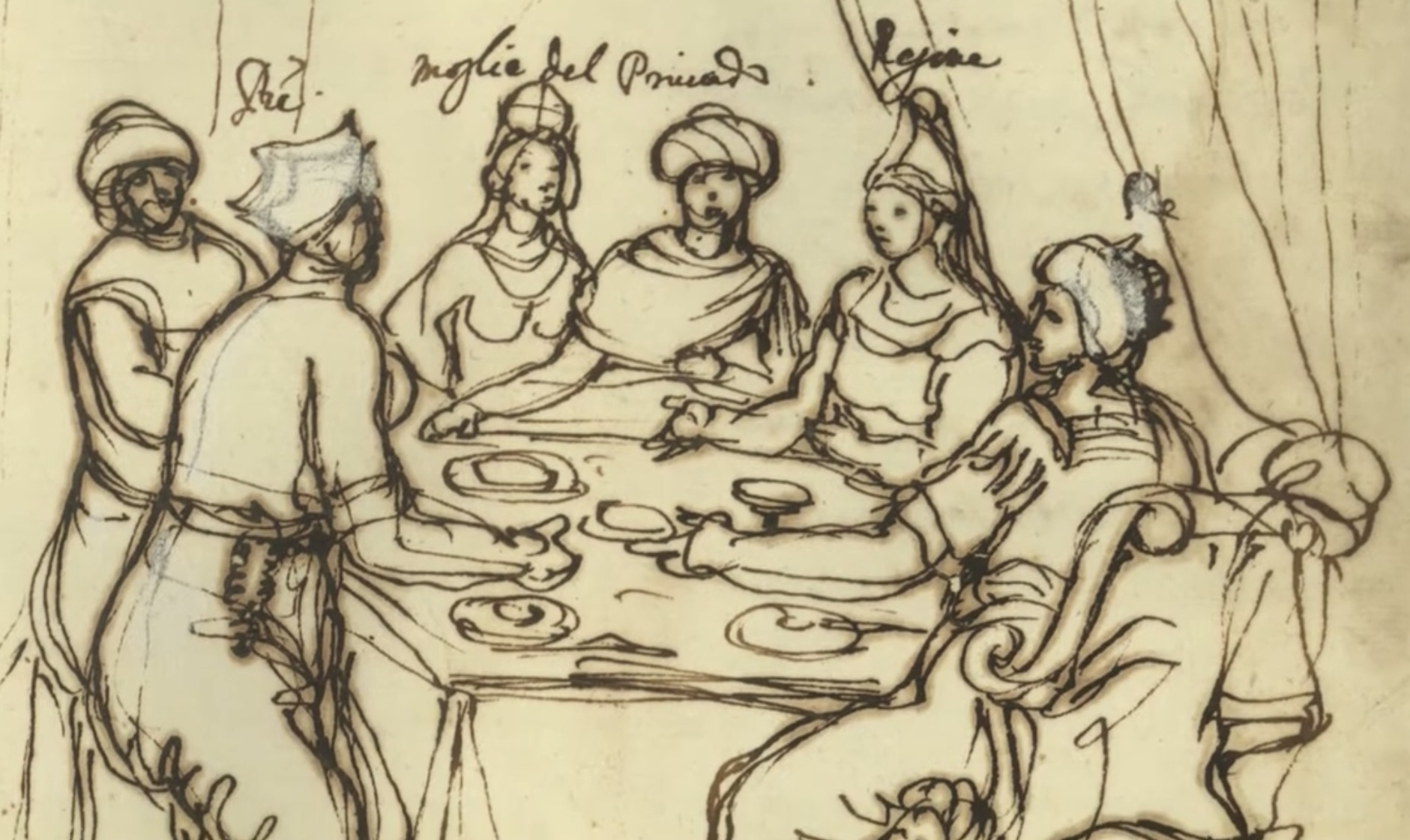
Georgian royalty at a feast, 17th-century drawing by Teramo Castelli

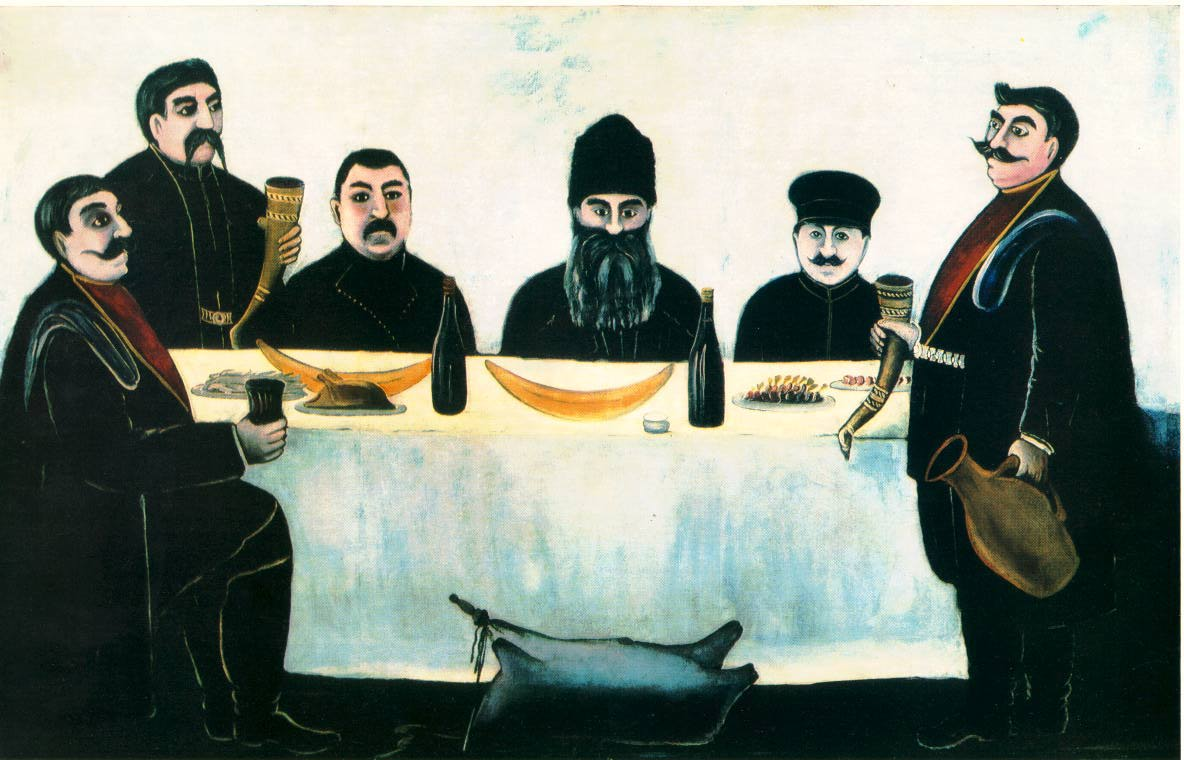
Begos' friends by Niko Pirosmani, painted in the 1910s. A tamada holding a kantsi (horn) and introducing a toast at a keipi (festive supra)

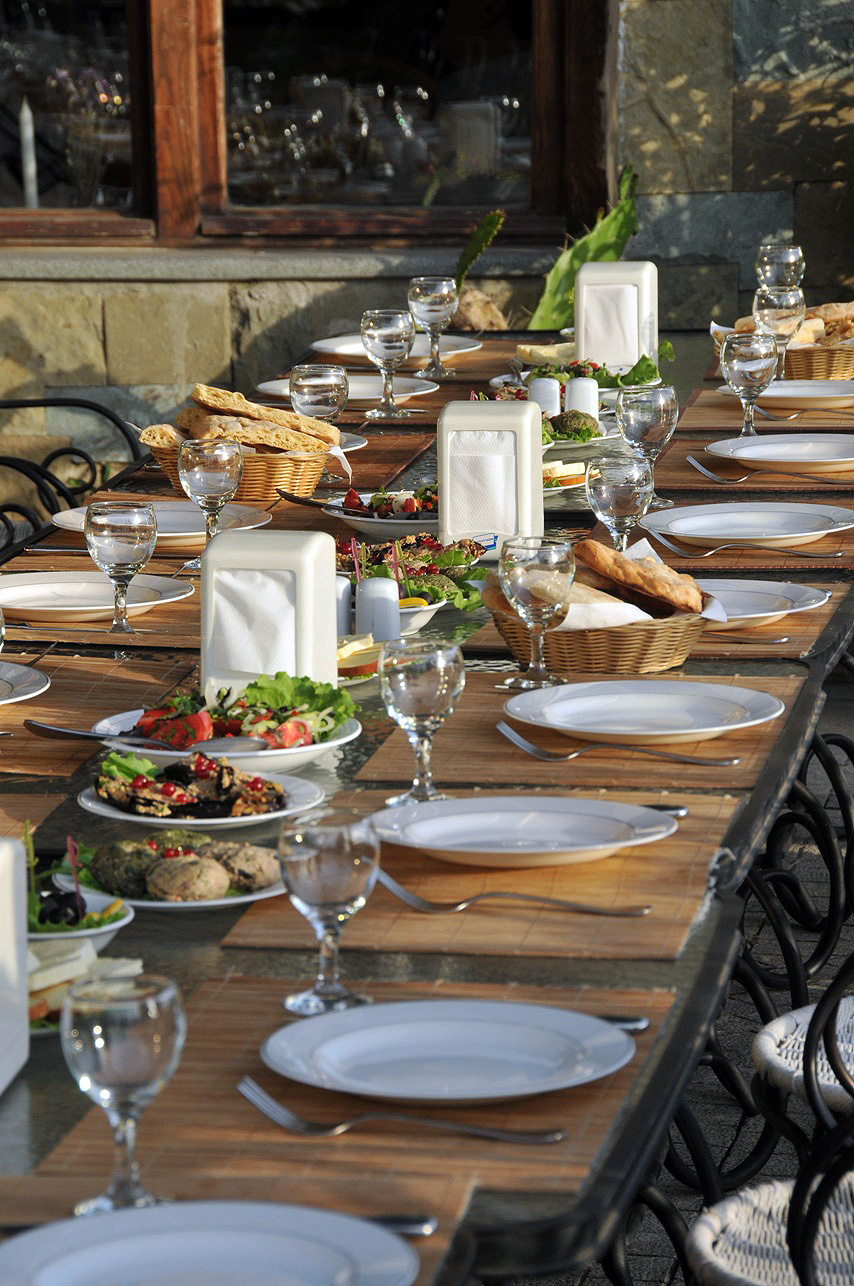
Readying for a supra at a Georgian restaurant in Tbilisi

In Georgian, "supra" literally means "table-cloth". The word was borrowed from the Persian word sofre (also meaning "table-cloth"), in turn an old borrowing from Arabic (سفره). The Persian word was also borrowed into Turkish (among other languages) as sofra. The Georgian court in Tiflis (present-day Tbilisi), situated within the Kingdom of Kartli, incorporated a substantial portion of ceremonial practices and terminology from Safavid traditions during the era of Safavid overlordship; it was within this historical epoch that the term found its way into the Georgian vocabulary.

== History ==
While feasting and indulging in wine are documented in the notable works of Georgian courtly literature such as The Knight in the Panther's Skin and Amiran-Darejaniani, as well as in early travel accounts, the tradition of the toastmaster and the practice of making toasts in a form similar to contemporary customs are noticeably absent during those periods. The Georgian terms for "toastmaster," namely tamada and t’olumbaši, respectively of Circassian and Turkish origin (Turkish: tulumbaş), do not appear in historical records until the 19th century. Additionally, the term "supra" itself, referring to the banquet, is not found, at least as a term for the feast; in the medieval Georgian translation of Ferdowsi's Shahnameh ("The Book of Kings"), supra solely denotes the tablecloth or dining table, mirroring its Persian source, sofre, in the original text. The Georgian expressions for feasting in pre-Tsarist times are identified as nadimi and p’uroba (derived from p’uri meaning "bread," commonly used to encompass all types of food served at a meal).

Historian John R. Perry contends that the origin of the Georgian custom and the term "supra" can be traced to the influence exerted by Safavid Iran. The Georgian courtiers of the Safavid shahs were influenced by both the Safavid drinking party, referred to as "sohbat" or companionship, and the more formal banquet, known as "sofre," which included a ritual conducted by a master of ceremonies, adapting these elements to their domestic usage. The Safavid iteration of drinking parties, characterized by ritual features, was shaped by the cultural impact of Inner Asian steppe nomads, specifically Mongol and Turkic peoples. Perry notes that while the contemporary Iranian sofre has evolved into a more restrained form, the Georgian supra has retained its bibulous Inner Asian traditions in the Caucasus region, serving as a lasting legacy of Safavid suzerainty. The Georgian adaptation of the Safavid version may have, in turn, influenced the analogous Russian practice of toasting in the aftermath of the Russian annexation of Georgia.

According to the philologist Levan Bregadze, the earliest occurrence of the Georgian term for "toast," sadγegrdzelo (literally meaning "for long life"), can be traced back to a mid-19th century poem by Grigol Orbeliani, inspired by a work of the Russian poet Vasily Zhukovsky composed in the aftermath of the Napoleon's invasion of Russia. Bregadze posits that the contemporary version of the Georgian supra finds its roots in the early 19th century, following the Russian annexation of Georgia, and had become widespread across the entire territory that constitutes present-day Georgia by the end of the 19th century.

Large public meals are never held in Georgia without a supra; when there are no tables, the supra is laid on the ground.

== Rules ==
Regardless of size and type, a supra is always led by a tamada, or toastmaster, who introduces each toast during the feast. The tamada is elected by the banqueting guests or chosen by the host. A successful tamada must possess great rhetorical skill and be able to consume a large amount of alcohol without showing signs of drunkenness.

During the meal, the tamada will propose a toast, and then speak at some length about the topic. The guests raise their glasses, but do not drink. After the tamada has spoken, the toast continues, often in a generally counter-clockwise direction (to the right). The next guest who wishes to speak raises their glass, holds forth, and then drains their glass. If a guest does not wish to speak, they may drink from their glass after some words that particularly resonate to them.

Eating is entirely appropriate during toasts, but talking is frowned upon. Once everyone who wishes to speak on the theme has done so, the tamada proposes a new toast, and the cycle begins again. Some popular traditional themes include toasts to God, Georgia, family, the Mother of God, various saints, friends, ancestors, and so on. The theme of each toast is up to the tamada, who should be able to tailor his or her toasts to the occasion.

A keipi toast is called sadghegrdzelo (სადღეგრძელო, [sadɣɛɡrdzɛlɔ]), while a kelekhi toast is called a shesandobari (შესანდობარი, [ʃɛsandɔbarɪ]).

== See also ==
- List of dining events
