= National Agency for Cultural Heritage Preservation of Georgia =

Government agency of Georgia (country)

- საქართველოს კულტურული მემკვიდრეობის დაცვის ეროვნული სააგენტო
- Coat of Arms of Georgia

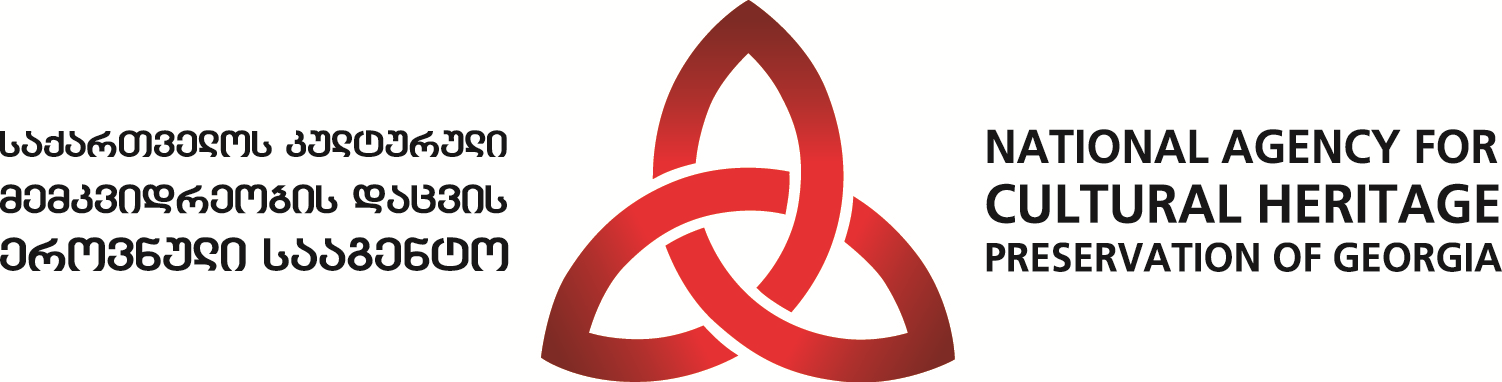
- Logo of the Agency

Agency overview
- Formed: 2008
- Headquarters: 27 Atoneli Street, Tbilisi, Georgia 0105
- Agency executives: Nikoloz Vacheishvili, Director General; Ina Avaliani, Deputy Director General; Ivane Vashakmadze, Deputy Director General
- Website: heritagesites.ge

The National Agency for Cultural Heritage Preservation of Georgia (Georgian: საქართველოს კულტურული მემკვიდრეობის დაცვის ეროვნული სააგენტო, sak'art'velos kulturuli memkvidreobis datsvis saagento) is a government agency in Georgia responsible for preservation, protection, research and promotion of cultural heritage of the country. The agency was established in 2008, bringing several major heritage monument complexes of national and global significance in Georgia under its umbrella. The agency is headed by the Director General, a position occupied by the art historian Nikoloz Vacheishvili since November 2008.

== Components ==
The monument complexes united under the National Agency for Cultural Heritage Preservation of Georgia are:

- Greater Mtskheta Archaeological Museum-Reserve — a series of monuments and archaeological sites in and around the town of Mtskheta, which are inscribed as a UNESCO World Heritage Site.
- Vardzia Historical-Architectural Museum-Reserve — the cave town and monasteries in Vardzia.
- Uplistsikhe Historical-Architectural Museum-Reserve — the cave town in Uplistsikhe.
- Ksani Valley Historical-Architectural Museum-Reserve — the historical monuments in the Ksani River valley.
- Petra-Tsikhisdziri Archaeological-Architectural Museum-Reserve — ruins of the fortified Roman town of Petra at Tsikhisdziri.
- Gonio-Apsaros Archaeological-Architectural Museum-Reserve — archaeological complex of Gonio, including the ancient fortress of Apsaros.
- Kldekari Historical-Architectural Museum-Reserve — ancient and medieval fortification systems of Kldekari.
- Nokalakevi Architectural-Archaeological Museum-Reserve — ruins of ancient and medieval town of Nokalakevi.
- Archaeological Museum-Reserve of Guria — archaeological museum and ruined monastic complexes in the region of Guria.
- Didi Liakhvi Valley State Museum-Reserve — monuments of the Greater Liakhvi River valley.
- Kutaisi Historical-Architectural Museum-Reserve — monuments in and around Kutaisi, including the UNESCO World Heritage sites, Gelati monastery and Bagrati cathedral.
- Stepantsminda History Museum — a history museum in Stepantsminda.
- Borjomi Local History Museum — a history museum in Borjomi.
- Niko Pirosmanishvili State Museum — a museum centered on the works of the Georgian painter Niko Pirosmanishvili (1862–1918) in Mirzaani.

The wider tasks of the agency include preservation, protection and promotion of museums, reserves, moveable and immoveable monuments and sites of the Georgian cultural heritage throughout both Georgia and beyond the country, archaeological expeditions, as well as development and implementation of cultural, education and tourist programs to popularize the Georgian cultural heritage. The agency has also been involved in negotiations with foreign governments over the protection of Georgian cultural heritage in respective countries, such as Turkey and Cyprus.

== List ==
↑ Element inscribed in the UNESCO Lists

#	Item	Date inscribed	Comment	Media
1	Georgian polyphonic singing ↑	17 November 2011	Inscribed in 2008 on UNESCO's Representative List of the Intangible Cultural Heritage of Humanity (originally proclaimed in 2001).	
2	Kvevri ↑	17 November 2011	Large egg-shaped earthenware vessels used for the fermentation, storage, and ageing of traditional Georgian wine. Inscribed in 2013 on UNESCO's Representative List of the Intangible Cultural Heritage of Humanity.	Georgian kvevri
3	Traditional kvevri wine-making method ↑	27 March 2012	Inscribed in 2013 on UNESCO's Representative List of the Intangible Cultural Heritage of Humanity.	Kvevri jugs buried in a Georgian winery
4	Dedaena, an introduction to Georgian for children	25 March 2013	Dedaena, literally, "a mother tongue", a children's primer compiled and published in 1876 by Iakob Gogebashvili	Dedaena, a 1912 edition
5	Traditional dance Perkhuli	25 March 2013	A predominantly male folk round dance, with as many as 20 versions.	Georgian dancers performing Perkhuli in 1965
6	Berikaoba	25 March 2013	An improvised masqueraded folk theatre, stemming from a pre-Christian festivity of fertility and rebirth.	A 1991 Soviet stamp dedicated to Berikaoba.
7	Kakhetian Mravalzhamieri	25 March 2013	A polyphonic folk song Mravalzhamieri ("polychronion") from the region of Kakheti.	
8	"Urban" Mravalzhamieri	25 March 2013	An urban version of Mravalzhamieri from Tbilisi.	
9	Children's literary magazine Dila	25 November 2013	A popular children's literary magazine founded in 1928 as Oktombreli and renamed in 1947 as Dila ("The Morning").	
10	Traditional dance Khorumi	25 November 2013	A traditional war dance, originally from the region of Adjara.	Khorumi dance performed by the Sukhishvili Georgian National Ballet
11	Meskhetian cheese Tenili	25 November 2013	Originally from the region of Meskheti, Tenili is made of threads of rich cow's or sheep's milk cheese briefly brined before being pressed into a clay pot.	Tenili cheese
12	"Makeup Anointment", an annual Shota Rustaveli Theatre and Film University students induction ceremony	5 January 2014	An annual induction ceremony of the Tbilisi-based Shota Rustaveli Theatre and Film University freshmen held at Marjanishvili Memorial Museum in Kvareli, a tradition established in 1974.	
13	Literary magazine Tsiskari	5 January 2014	The Georgian-language literary magazine Tsiskari ("The Dawn"), founded in 1852.	The September 1852 issue of Tsiskari.
14	Technology and culture of the Lagidze Waters	5 January 2014	The Lagidze Waters are a popular brand of soft drinks established by Mitropane Lagidze in 1887.	At a Lagidze Waters restaurant.
15	Chidaoba, a Georgian wrestling style ↑	25 September 2014	A Georgian folk wrestling style. Inscribed in 2018 on UNESCO's Representative List of the Intangible Cultural Heritage of Humanity.	Traditionally-dressed Georgian folk wrestlers. A c. 1899 photo by Aleksandr Yermakov.
16	Dambalkhacho	25 September 2014	A variety of fermented curd from the highland province of Pshavi.	Dambalkhacho
17	Living culture of three writing systems of the Georgian alphabet ↑	20 March 2015	Inscribed in 2016 on UNESCO's Representative List of the Intangible Cultural Heritage of Humanity.	The Jruchi Gospels, a 10th-century Georgian manuscript.
18	Chuniri	20 March 2015	A bowed folk musical instrument from the region of Svaneti.	Chuniri at a museum in Tbilisi.
19	Svan hat	20 March 2015	Traditional technology of felted wool hat making from Svaneti, one of important elements of the Svan cultural identity.	A man wearing a traditional Svan hat.
20	Svan cuisine: P'etvraal	20 March 2015	A Svanetian variety of khachapuri, a traditional Georgian dish of cheese-filled bread, but with added millet flour to its cheese filling.	
21	Svan cuisine: Kubdari (Kubed)	20 March 2015	A meat filled pastry, a signature dish of Svaneti.	Kubdari
22	Svan cuisine: Svanuri marili or Lushnu Jim	20 March 2015	Svanetian salt, a traditional spicy salt blend.	
23	Svan cuisine: Tashmijabi	20 March 2015	A cream of potatoes and cheese mixed with corn flour from Svaneti.	
24	Tradition of learning Vepkhistqaosani by heart	7 October 2015	The tradition of learning and reciting the 12th-century national epic Vepkhistqaosani ("The Knight in the Panther's Skin") by Shota Rustaveli, composed of some 1,500 stanzas, was widespread among the Georgians, especially young women, and survived into the 21st century.	Vepkhistqaosani, a 1712 printed edition.
25	Tradition of use of medicinal mineral springs in Upper Svaneti	15 October 2015	The mineral springs of Mugviri, Artskheeli, Kakhrld, Legab, Seti, Kvedilash, and Shdegi have been used for medicinal purposes for several centuries.	
26	Traditional technique of making the Svanetian folk instrument Changi	15 October 2015	Changi is a Svanetian version of an ancient harp-like instrument with at least six strings.	Changi at a museum in Tbilisi.
27	Tradition of wood carving in Svanetian architecture and household items	15 October 2015	Pieces of vernacular architecture and churches in highland Svaneti are richly adorned with ornate wood carving, a tradition going back to the Middle Ages.	The Lashkheti church door, an example of the 10th-century wood carving art.
28	Literary magazine Gantiadi	15 October 2015	Gantiadi ("The Daybreak"), a Georgian literary magazine established in Kutaisi in 1915.	
29	Technology of Kakhetian Churchkhela	7 November 2015	Churchkhela made in Georgia's wine-making region of Kakheti is a particularly popular variety of this traditional Georgian candle-shaped candy, strings of nuts that are repeatedly dipped in concentrated grape juice.	Strings of churchkhela in Kakheti.
30	Kakhetian hat	7 November 2015	A felted hat from the region of Kakheti.	A Kakhetian man with a jug of wine, painted by R. Gvelesiani, 1883.
31	Kakhetian bread "dedas puri"	7 November 2015	Dedas puri ("mother's bread") is a Kakhetian type of tonis puri, baked in a specific bakery.	Types of bread baked at a traditional Georgian bakery.
32	Tradition of pottery in Vardisubani	7 November 2015	The village of Vardisubani is the principal center of traditional pottery in Kakheti.	
33	Svan funeral ritual with zari	16 March 2016	Zari (zär) is a funeral chant from Svaneti, bearing traces of pre-Christian tradition.	
34	Tradition of falconry	27 October 2016	Old Georgian tradition of falconry, bazieroba.	Hunting with goshawk in Kakheti, 1979.
35	Supra, a traditional Georgian feast	29 March 2017	Supra, a traditional Georgian feast and an important part of Georgian social culture.	A Feast of Three Noblemen, a painting by Pirosmani, 1905.
36	Traditional culture and manufacturing technology of blue tablecloth	9 June 2017	Traditional Georgian cotton tablecloths painted in various shades of blue, known from at least the 17th century.	A blue tablecloth at a folk art museum in Tbilisi.
37	Georgian folk medicine	23 August 2017	Georgian folk medicine and traditions associated with its use	
38	Twenty-six-century-long tradition of the Georgian–Jewish relations	13 April 2018	The Jewish presence in Georgia is regarded to have begun with their exodus during the Babylonian captivity in 6th century BC.	Israel's 60th independence day celebration in Tbilisi, Georgia, in 2007.
39	Tskhavati pottery	13 April 2018	Tradition of pottery from the village of Tskhavati.	
40	Georgian silk	12 June 2018		Tbilisi National Silk Museum.
41	Ulami in the Ksani valley	10 August 2018	Tradition of voluntary collective work in the rural Shida Kartli area.	
42	Isindi, Tskhenburti, Kabakhi, Marula	31 August 2018	Types of Georgian horseback mounted team sports.	
43	Georgian corn	7 September 2018		
44	Preparing Abkhazian and Mingrelian adjika	20 November 2018		Adjika
45	Tradition of Khachapuri in Georgia	22 January 2019	On 22 January 2019 With the order of The CEO of National agency for cultural heritage of Georgia, Nikoloz Antidze, The Georgian tradition of Khachapuri pastries was given the status of Intangible cultural heritage of Georgia. The initiators of this were LTD "Gunda", led by Nana Dolidze and Levan Qoqiashvili. Currently the same people are working on to make UNESCO proclaim Tradition of Khachapuri as an Intangible cultural heritage of Humanity. On the behalf of Gastronomic Association of Georgia, the 27th of February was announced as the National Khachapuri Day, to celebrate Georgia's timeless signature pastry as well as to promote its recognition internationally.	
46	Tradition of women councils in Georgia	12 February 2019		
47	Lelo burti	6 March 2019	A type of Georgian horseback mounted team sport.	
48	Traditional Georgian ferry	6 March 2019		
49	Chokha wearing tradition	9 June 2020		Abkhaz and Georgian generals wearing Chokha
50	The oldest traditional method of brewing beer in the mountains of Georgia	9 June 2020		

== See also ==
- Intangible Cultural Heritage of Georgia
