= Georgian dance =

Type of dance

The Georgian dance (Georgian: ქართული ცეკვა), commonly known as Kartuli, is the traditional dance of Georgia. It stems from military moves, sports games, and dances celebrated during holidays in the Middle Ages. The dance was popularized by the founders of the Georgian National Ballet, Iliko Sukhishvili, and his wife, Nino Ramishvili.

Two folk dances, Perkhuli and Khorumi, are on the Intangible Cultural Heritage of Georgia list.

== History ==
The folk dances of the Georgian people have an ancient history, as evidenced by numerous historical sources and archaeological findings.

Georgian tribes inhabited the eastern part of the Black Sea coast several centuries before the adoption of Christianity. The works of the ancient Greek geographer Strabo contain vivid descriptions of the pagan rituals of the Georgians, which included elements of dance. The arrival of Christianity introduced significant changes into the life of the population; however, many rituals were preserved and adapted to the new religion. Within these rituals, dance gradually assumed a leading role, while the religious content diminished. In this way, Georgian dances developed into an integral element of folk artistic culture.

It is known that by the 4th century BCE, secular music was widespread among Georgian tribes. The Colchian tribes began their battles with martial songs and dances.

During the medieval period, dance became increasingly professionalized, and performances were frequently held in the palaces of kings and feudal lords. At this time, solo and paired dances underwent significant development, and canonical dance movements became firmly established.

== Types of Georgian dance ==
=== Kartuli ===
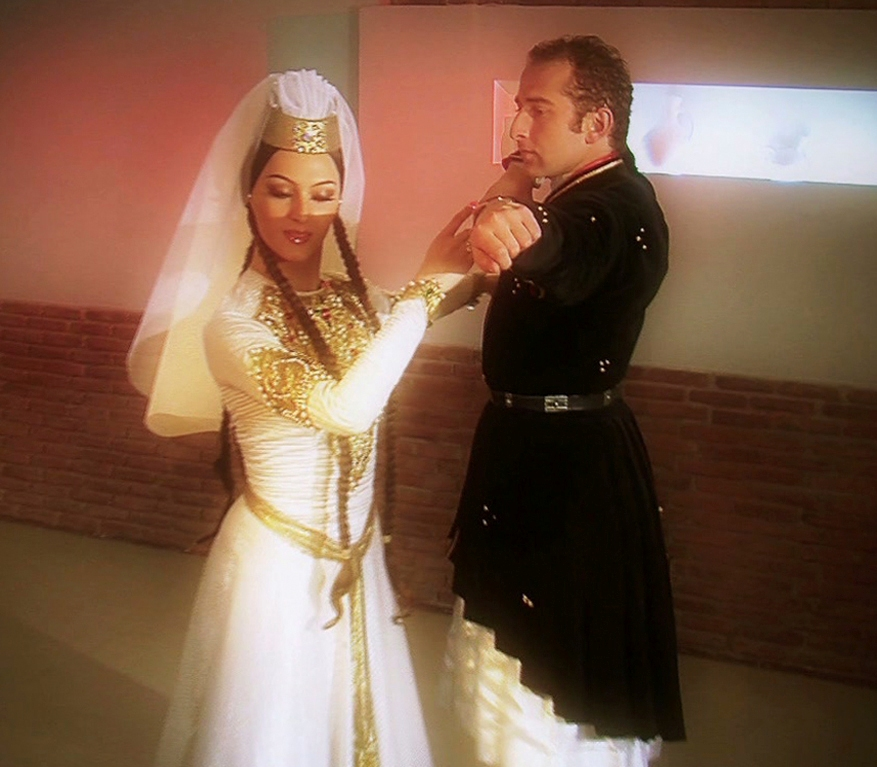
Kartuli

Kartuli (ქართული) dance is a romantic, or wedding dance, performed by a couple. During the dance, the man is not allowed to touch the woman and must keep a certain distance. The man's upper body is motionless at all times. It shows that even in love, men must control their feelings. The man focuses his eyes on his partner as if she were the only woman in the whole world. The woman keeps her eyes downcast at all times and glides on the rough floor as a swan on the smooth surface of a lake. There have been only a few great performers of Kartuli including Nino Ramishvili, Iliko Sukhishvili, Iamze Dolaberidze, and Pridon Sulaberidze.

=== Khorumi ===
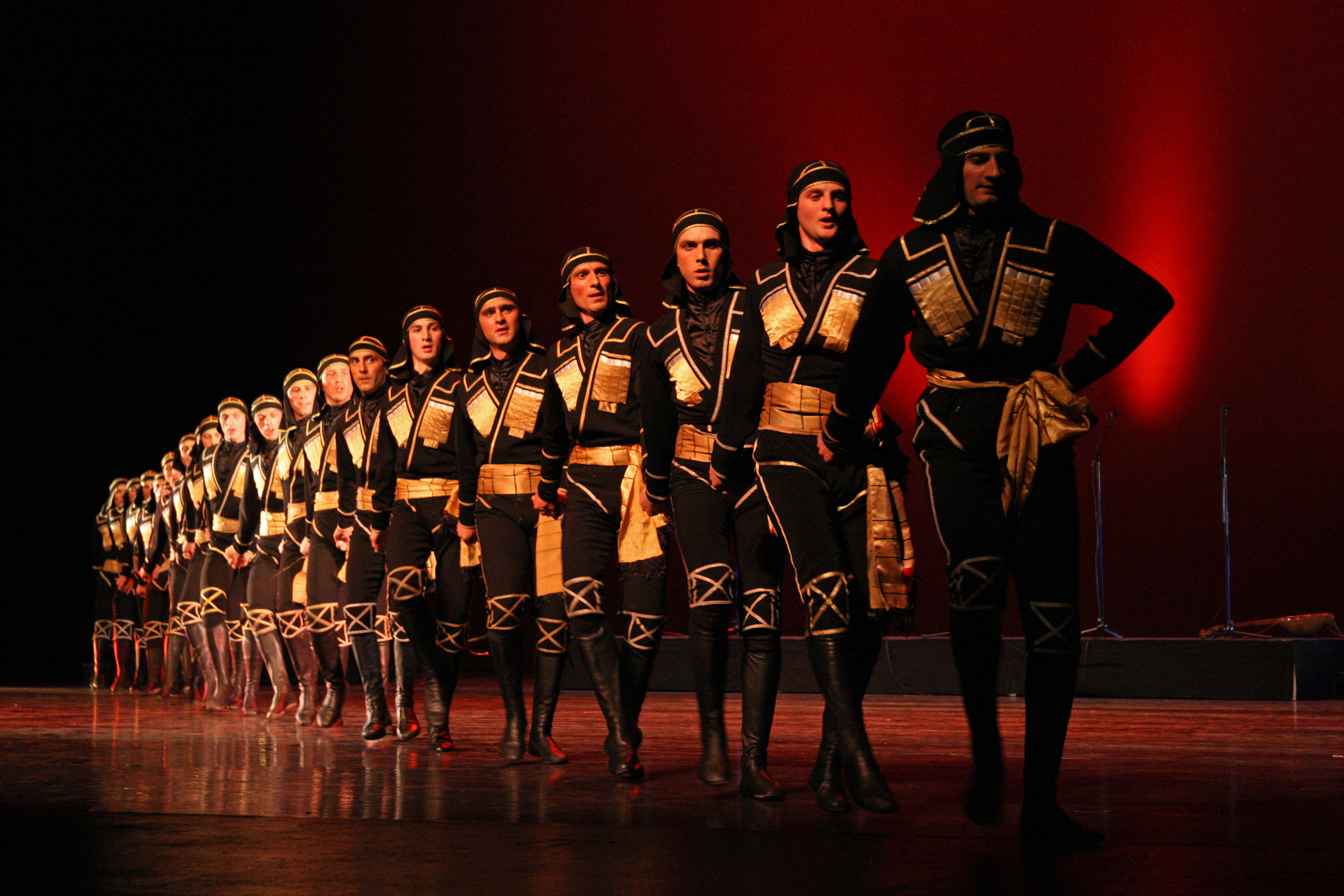
Khorumi

Khorumi (ხორუმი) is a war dance originating in Guria, southwestern Georgia, and is based on the numerous invasions of the country. The dance was originally performed by only a few men. However, over time it has grown. In today's version of Khorumi, 30-40 dancers can participate, as long as the number is odd. The dance has four parts: searching for a campsite, the reconnoiter of the enemy camp, the fight, and the victory and its celebration. It is strong and simple but distinctive movements and precise lines create a sense of awe. The dance portrays the themes of search war, the celebration of victory, and the courage and glory of Georgian soldiers. Khorumi is traditionally accompanied by instruments and is not accompanied by clapping. Drum (doli) and the bagpipe (chiboni) are two key instruments to accompany Khorumi. Another unique element of Khorumi is that it has a specific rhythm, based on five beat meter (3+2).

=== Acharuli ===
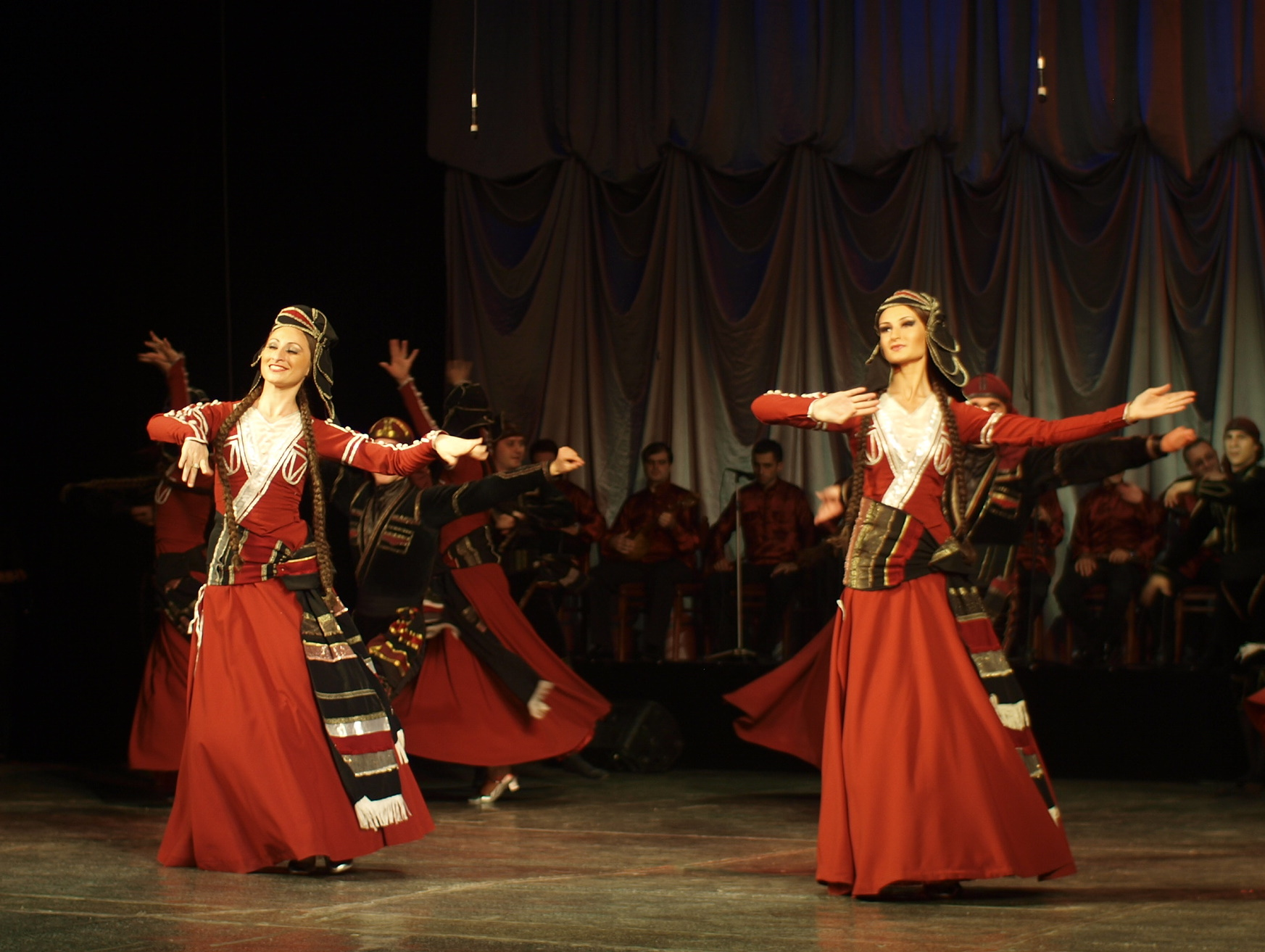
Acharuli

Acharuli (აჭარული) is a bright and cheerful dance that originates from the Adjara region of Georgia. It portrays playful flirtation between men and women. The mood of the dance is relaxed, joyful, and lively, with dancers wearing colorful costumes, predominantly featuring the color red. Unlike the Kartuli dance, the interaction between men and women in Acharuli is more relaxed and informal.

=== Partsa ===
Partsa (ფარცა) is a fast pace dance originating in Guria and is characterized by its rhythm, festive mood, and colorfulness. Partsa mesmerizes the audience with not only speed and gracefulness, but also with "live towers".

=== Kazbeguri ===
Kazbeguri (ყაზბეგური) originated in the Kazbegi Municipality in Caucasus Mountains of Georgia. The dance was created to portray the cold and rough climate of the mountains, shown through the vigor and the strictness of the movements and foot stomping. This dance is performed mainly by men. Costumes are long black coloured shirts, black trousers, pairs of black boots, and black headgear. Musical instruments include bagpipes, panduri, a changi, and drums.

=== Khanjluri ===
Khanjluri (ხანჯლური) is based on the idea of competition and war. In this dance, shepherds, dressed in red chokhas (traditional men's wear) compete with each other in dagger skills and in performing complicated movements. One performer replaces another, and courage and skill are showcased. Since Khanjluri involves daggers and knives, it requires tremendous practice on the part of the performers.

=== Khevsuruli ===
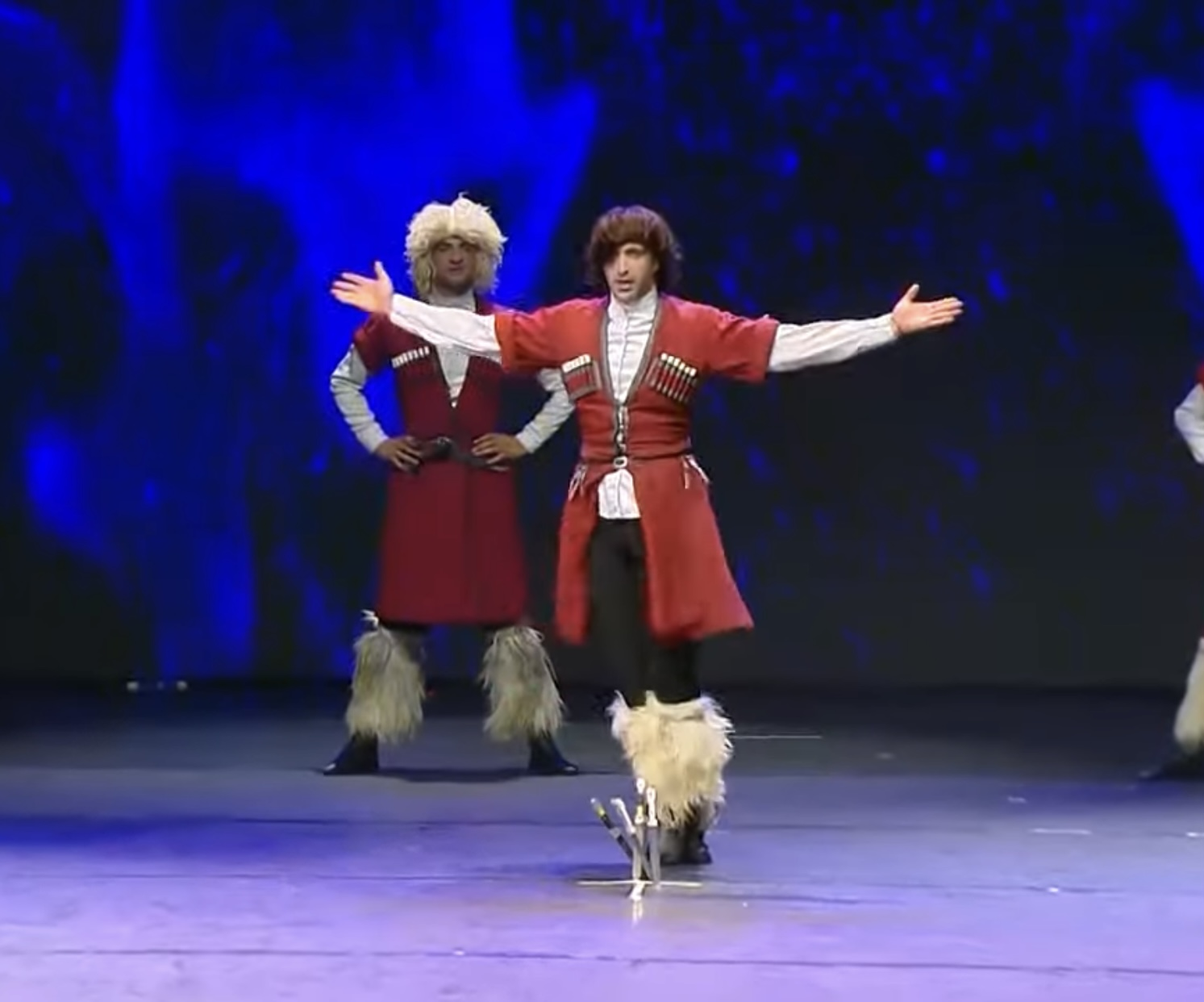
Khanjluri

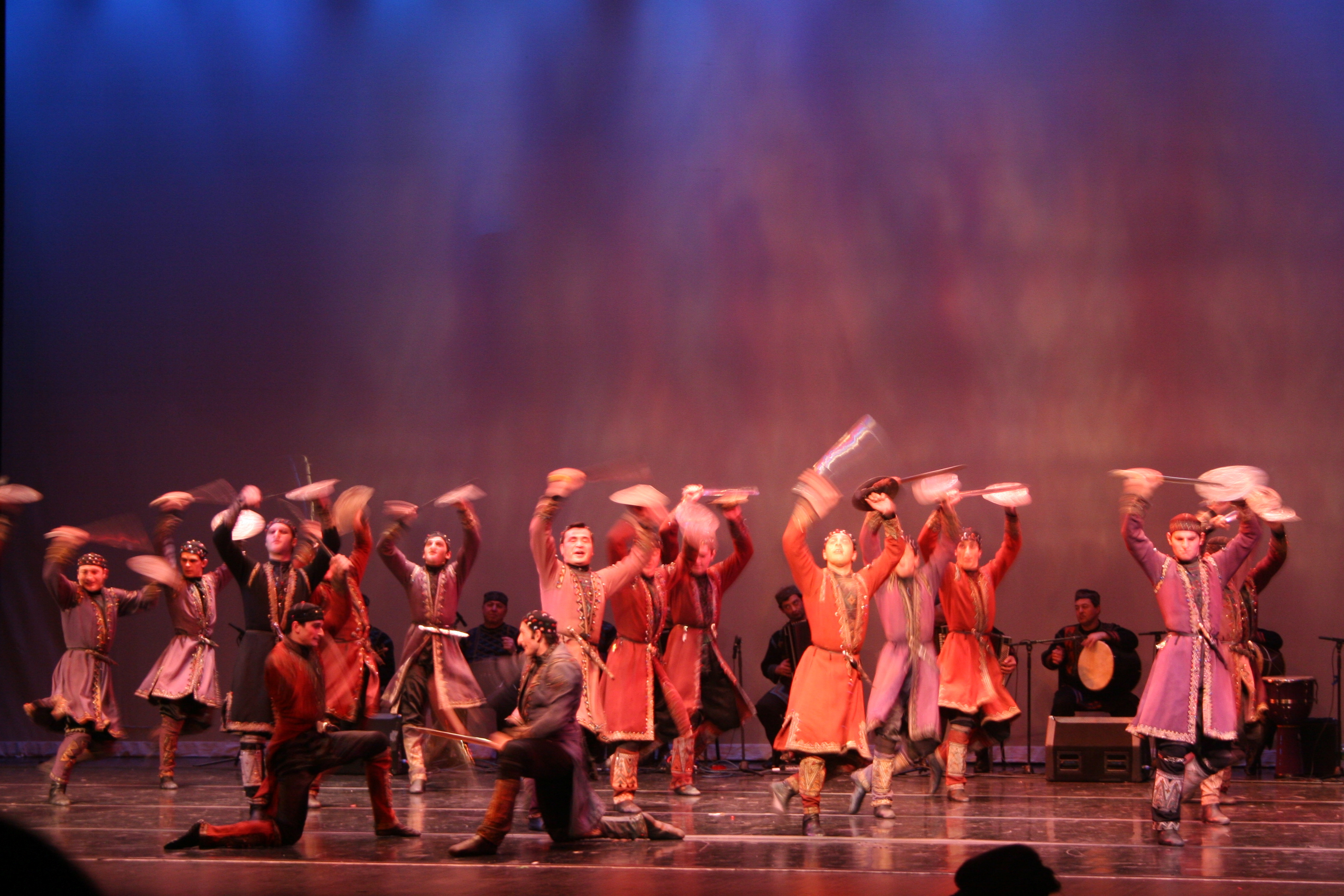
Khevsuruli

Khevsuruli (ხევსურული) is a mountain dance that involves themes of love, courage, respect for women, toughness, competition, skill, beauty, and colorfulness. The dance starts with a flirting couple. Unexpectedly, another young man appears, also seeking the hand of the woman. Vigorous fighting between the two men and their supporters ensues. The quarrel is stopped temporarily by the woman's veil. Traditionally, when a woman throws her head veil between two men, all disagreements and fighting halts. However, as soon as the woman leaves the scene, the fighting continues. The young men from both sides attack each other with swords and shields. On some occasions, one man has to fight off 3 attackers. At the end, a woman comes in and stops the fighting with her veil once again. However, the finale of the dance is open—–meaning that the audience does not know the outcome of the fighting. Khevsuruli is very technical and requires intense practice and utmost skill in order to perform the dance without hurting anyone.

=== Mtiuluri ===
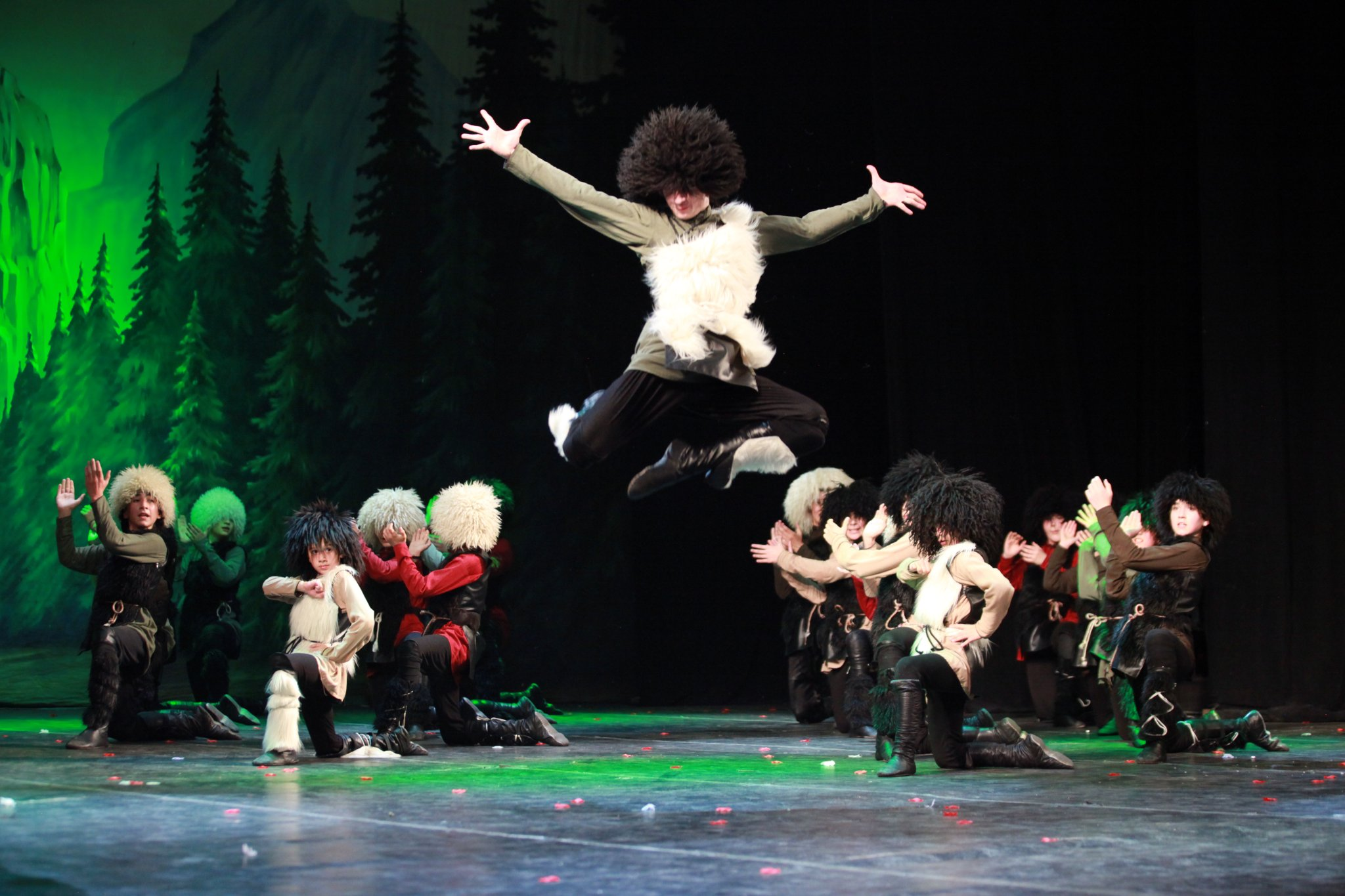
Mtiuluri

Mtiuluri (მთიულური) is a mountain dance being, similarly to Khevsuruli, based on competition. However, in this dance, the competition is mainly between two groups of young men and is a celebration of skill and art. At first, groups compete in performing complicated movements. Then, next piece, the woman's dance, is followed by an individual dancer's performance of amazing "tricks" on their knees and toes. At the end, everyone dances a beautiful finale. This dance is reminiscent of a festival in the mountains.

=== Simdi and Khonga ===
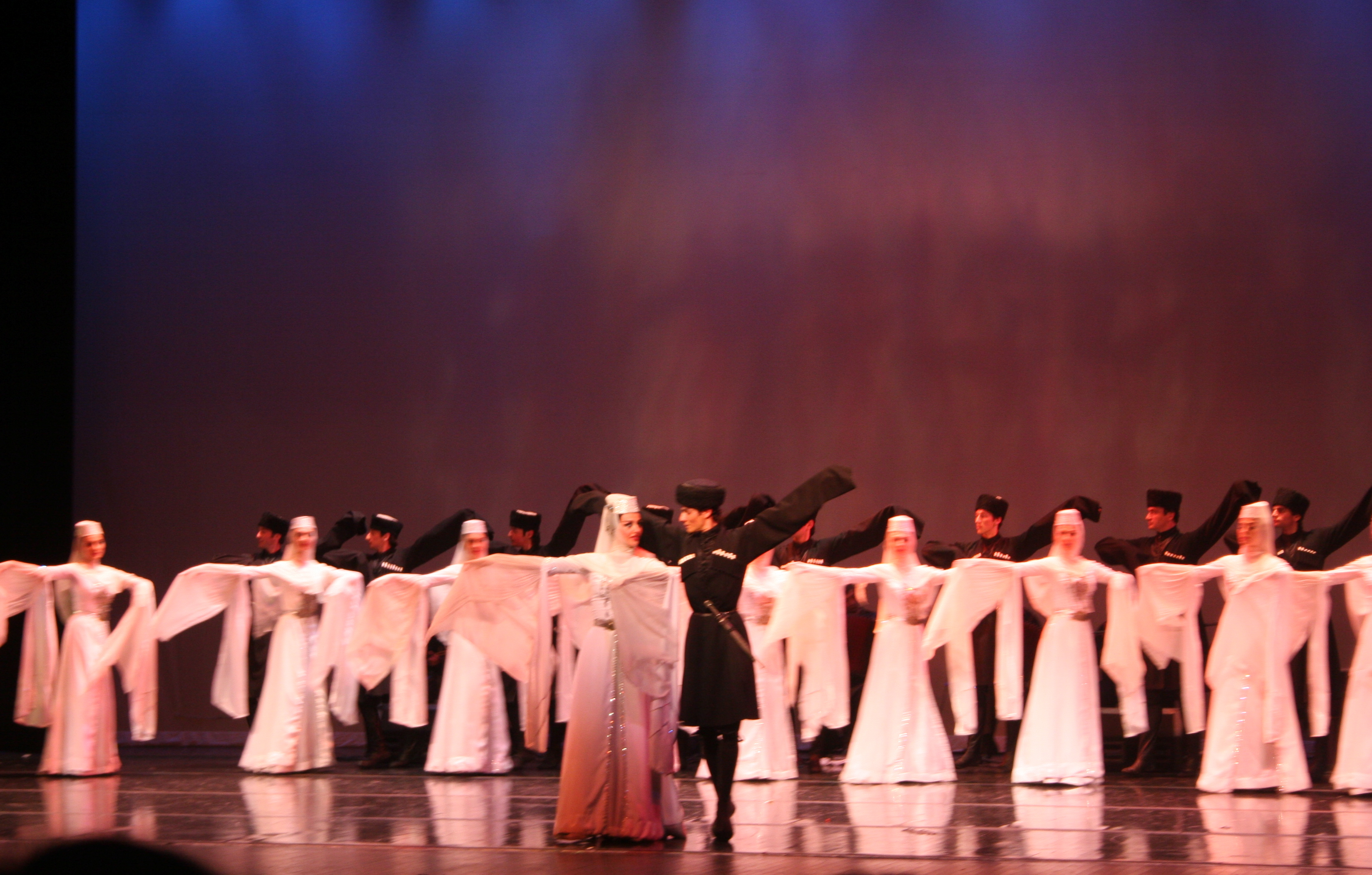
Simdi

Simdi (სიმდი) and Khonga (ხონგა) are Georgian folk dances. The costumes in both dances have distinctive long sleeves. The headwear of both the women and the men are exceptionally high. However, in Khonga or Invitation Dance (Georgian Wedding Dance), men dance on demi-pointe, entirely on the balls of their feet. Khonga is performed by a few dancers and is characterized by the grace and softness of the movements. Simdi is danced by many couples. The beauty of Simdi is in the strict graphic outline of the dance, the contrast between black and white costumes, the softness of movements, and the strictness of line formations.

=== Kintouri and Shalakho ===
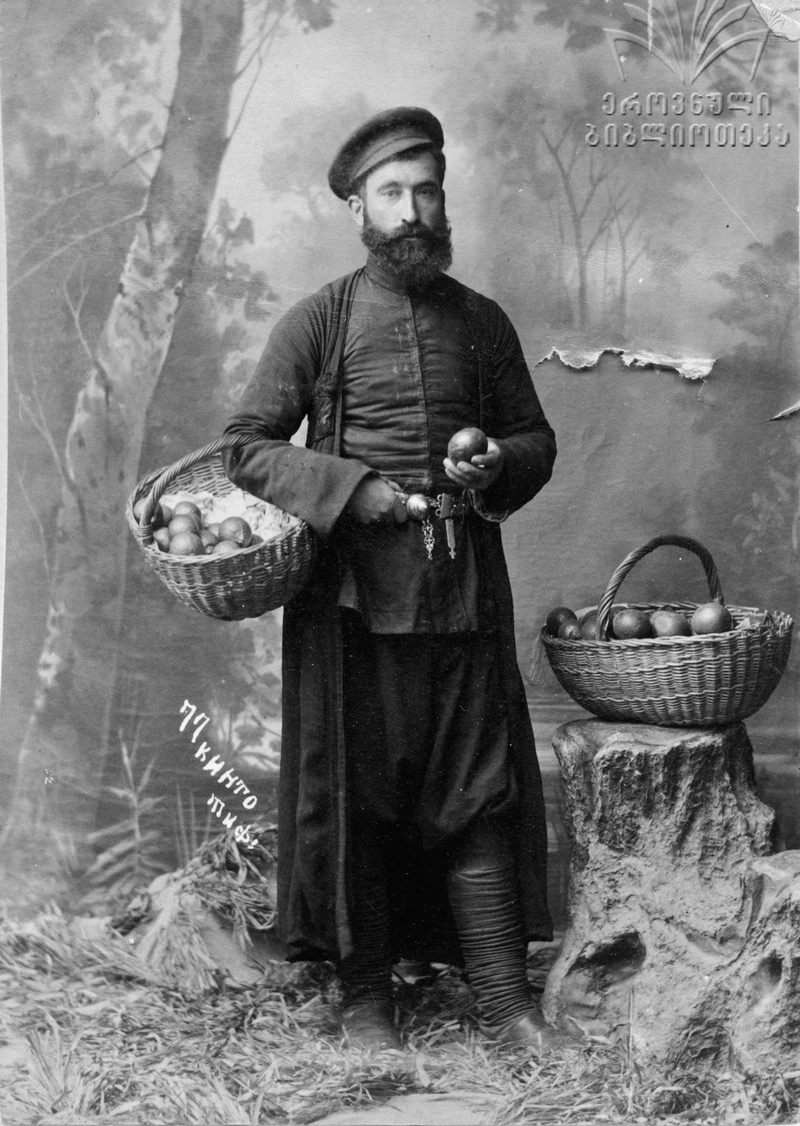
A kinto holding a basket of fruit, photo by Alexander Roinashvili (photo from 1898 or before)

Kintouri (კინტოური) and Shalakho (შალახო) are dances that portrays the city life of old Tbilisi. The dance is named after "Kintos" who were small merchants in Tbilisi. They wore black outfits with baggy pants and usually carried their goods on their heads around the city. When a customer chose goods, a kinto would take the silk shawl hanging from his silver belt and wrap the fruits and vegetables in them to weigh. Kintos were known to be cunning, swift, and informal. Such characteristics of Kinto are well shown in Kintouri. The dance is light natured.

=== Samaia ===
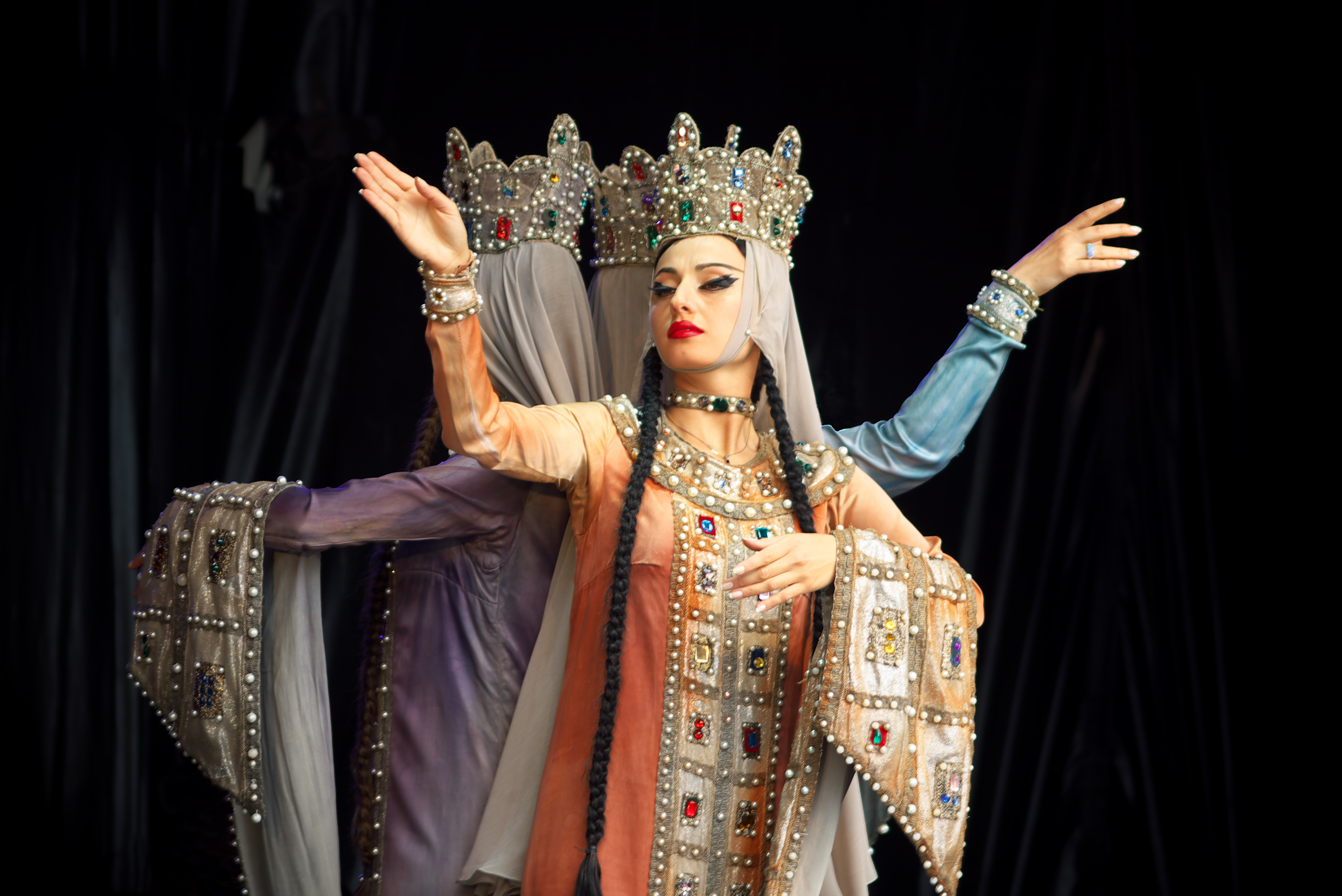
Samaia performed by a female Sukhishvili ensemble

Samaia (სამაია) is performed by three women and was originally considered to be a Pagan dance. However, today's Samaia is a representation of Tamar of Georgia who was the first empress of Georgia, and reigned in 12th-13th centuries. There are only 4 frescos that retain the image of Empress Tamar. Simon Virsaladze based the costumes of Samaia on the Empress's clothing on those frescos. In addition, the trinity idea in the dance represents Tamar of Georgia as a young princess, a wise mother and the powerful empress. All these three images are united in one harmonious picture. The simple but soft and graceful movements create an atmosphere of beauty, glory and power that surrounded the Empress's reign.

=== Jeirani ===
Jeiriani (ჯეირანი), meaning gazelle, is a dance that tells the story of a hunt, incorporating classical ballet movements and a hunting scene. It was choreographed by Nino Ramishvili for the Georgian National Ballet.

=== Karachokheli ===
Karachokheli (ყარაჩოხელი) were the ordinary craftsman of Georgia. They typically wore black chokha (traditional men's wear). They were known for hard work yet a carefree life, as well as a love of Georgian wine and beautiful women, all of which are well represented in the dance.

=== Davluri ===
Davluri (დავლური) is a city dance, but unlike Kintouri and Karachokheli, it portrays the city aristocracy. The dance is similar to Kartuli. However, the movements in Davluri are less complicated and the male/female relationship is less formal. The dance is performed by many couples and, with the music and colorful costumes, simulates an aristocratic feast on stage.

=== Mkhedruli ===
Mkhedruli (მხედრული), based on the word Mkhedari (მხედარი), means cavalryman, is a dance that begins in a raging tempo, becoming more and more violent. The legs of the cavalryman imitate the fast movements of the horse, while their body and arm movements impersonate the battle with an enemy.

=== Parikaoba ===
Parikaoba (ფარიკაობა) is warrior dance from Khevsureti in northeast Georgia, where a girl enters, looking for her beloved. He appears only to encounter others, precipitating an energetic battle with his sword and shield. When the girl throws down her headdress, the men stop, only to renew their battle soon after.

== Gallery ==
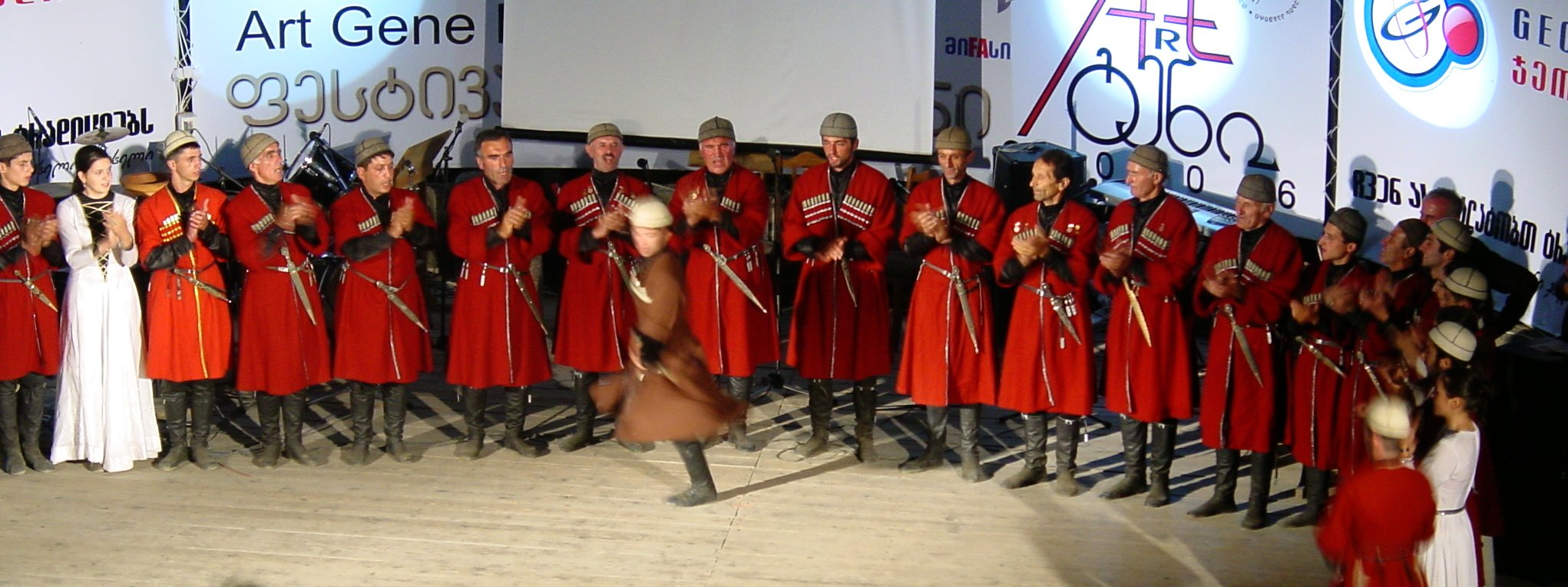
Svanuri

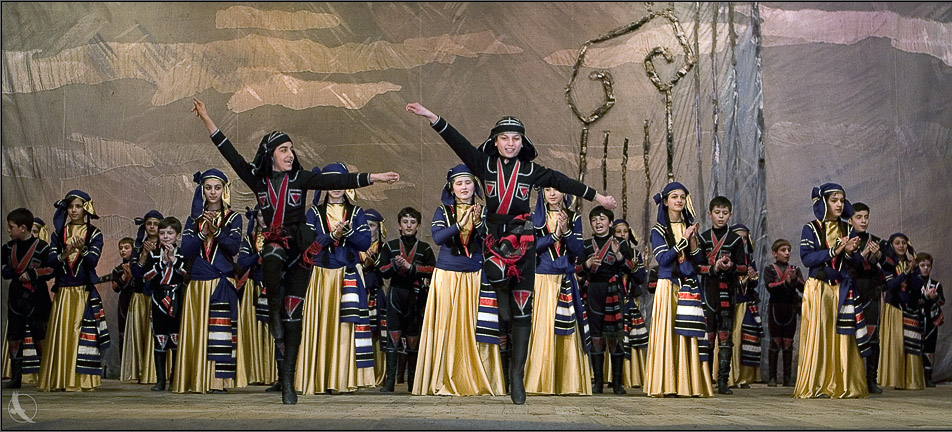
Acharuli

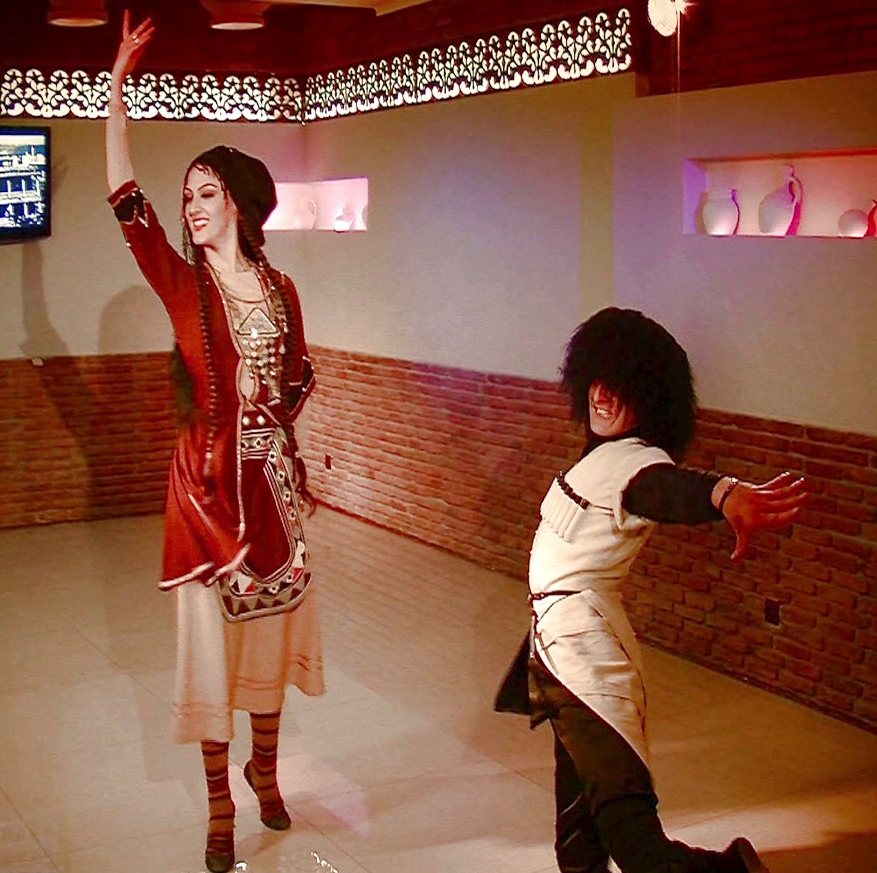
Mtiuluri

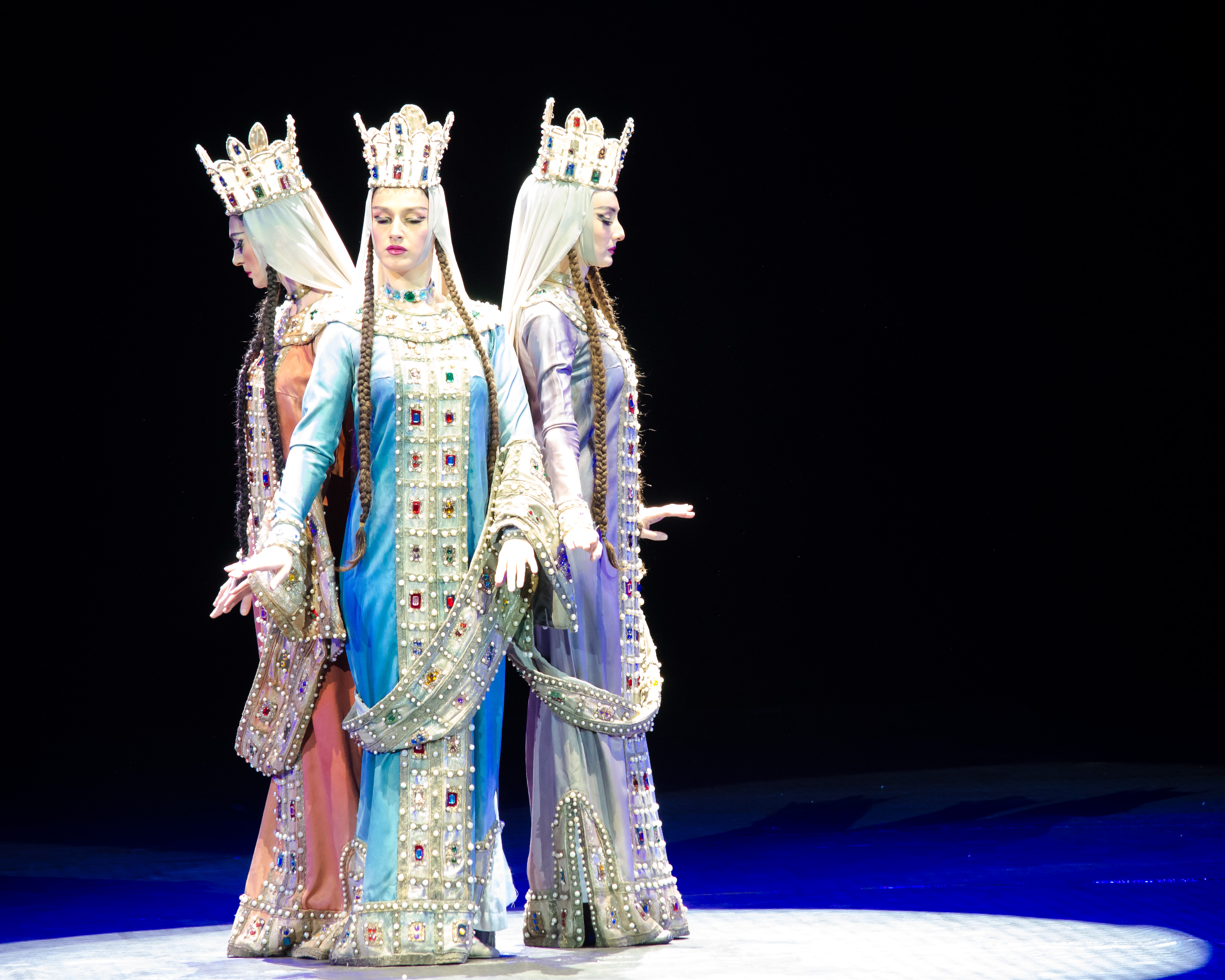
Samaia

== See also ==
- Sukhishvili Georgian National Ballet
- Khorumi

== Bibliography ==
- Javrishvili, David L. (1958). Georgian Folk Dances. Tbilisi: State Publishing House "Sabchota Sakartvelo".
