= Maria Perini =

Maria I. Perini
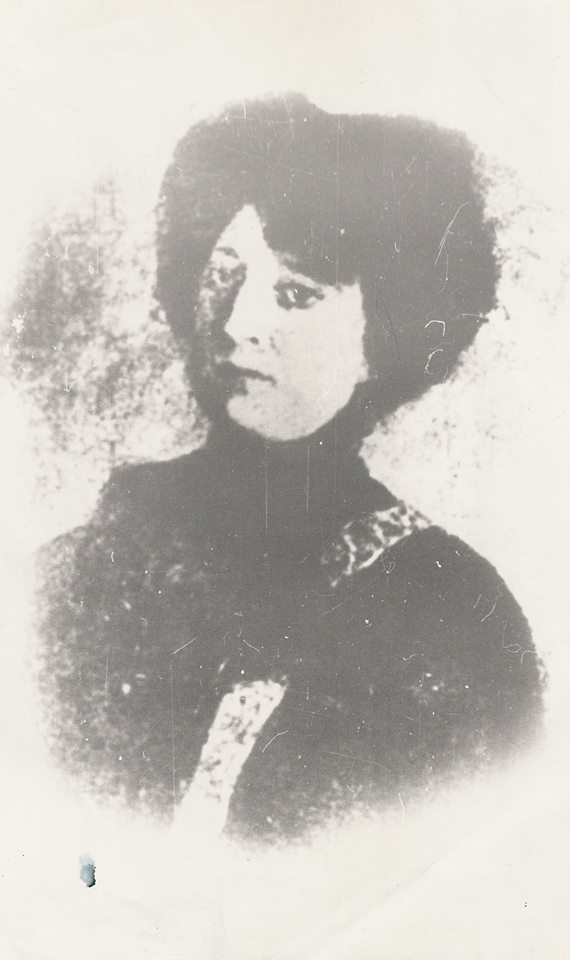
- Maria Perini
- Born: March 10, 1873; Turin, Italy
- Died: January 1, 1939 (aged 65); Nice, France
- Occupation: Ballet dancer
- Known for: Teacher of many famous Georgian dancers
- Spouse: Henryk Hryniewski

Maria I. Perini (March 10, 1873 - 1939) was an Italian ballet teacher. In 1916, she opened the first private ballet studio in the Tbilisi State Academy of Arts and went on to teach many of the famous Georgian dancers including Dimitri and Irina Aleksidze, Maria Bauer, Soliko Virsaladze, Nino Ramishvili, Iliko Sukhishvili, Vakhtang Chabukiani, Elene Chikvaidze, Maria Kazinets, and Elene Gvaramadze. Her methods of teaching classical dance laid solid foundations for developing Georgian ballet. She was married to the Polish-Georgian artist Henryk Hryniewski.

Perini's students described her as a dedicated instructor who established and developed classical ballet in Tbilisi, contributing positively to their childhood experiences.

== Biography ==
=== Early life and education ===
Perini was born in Northern Italy and graduated from Turin Royal Opera ballet school. She performed alongside such well-known dancers as Virginia Zucchi, P. Lenian, and Enrico Cecchetti.

=== Career ===
In 1891, Perini was invited to perform at the Tbilisi Opera Theatre as soloist. She was the first to perform 32 fouetté turns for the Georgian audience and demonstrated virtuoso performance of ballet moves.

From 1897 to 1907, she was prima ballerina at the Tbilisi Opera and Ballet Theatre, followed by pedagogical and concert activities.

In 1916, she opened the first private ballet and classical dance studio in the Tbilisi State Academy of Arts building (the former House of Arshakuni) at Griboedovi street in Tbilisi. An impressive ballet production of Coppeliaby Delibes and a dance act from The Blue Birdby Maeterlinck were staged. The studio raised many masters of Georgian ballet, including Vakhtang Chabukiani, founders of the Georgian National Ballet theater Iliko Sukhishvili and Nino Ramishvili, Tamar Chabukiani, and Simon Virsaladze.

In 1922, the Academy of Arts of Georgia was founded in a house of merchant Arshakun, on the Commandant Street. Until 1937, the wing of this building served as workshop of Henryk Hryniewski, an artist, professor of the academy, and as Maria's ballet studio.

Hryniewski, a native of Poland, got art education in Florence, and upon returning to Georgia became founder of the Tbilisi Academy of Arts, together with D. Chubinashvili, Iakob Nikoladze, Eugene Lanceray, A. Kalgin and others.

In 1920, the studio was renamed “Ballet School of the State Theatre”. Perini was appointed as director, while Nicholas Sergeyev, ballet master at the Saint Petersburg Opera Theatre, was invited as pedagogue. The tuition fee was not high, although kids from needy families were taught for free. In 1925, the studio presented a performance by students; poet Ioseb Grishashvili wrote:

“Student girls rushed around. You could see Perini’s caring hand in their dancing, as well as Sergeev’s and Arbatov’s artistic taste. Four proficient ballet artists girls were outstanding: L. Chikvaidze, L. Begtabegishvili, M. Bauer, L. Gvaramadze. Exceptional was Vakhtang Chabukiani with his passion, technique and temperament, who definitely has bright future ahead.”

In 1927, the arts department of the National Committee for Education initiated an evening dedicated to 30 years anniversary of Maria Perini's artistic and pedagogical work. The Opera Theatre hosted the performances of The Magic Lake and other choreographic etudes.

In 1936, Perini attended and was impressed by the premiere of the first Georgian ballet, staged by her student, Vakhtang Chabukiani. The same year she was nominated as the Honored People's Artist of Georgian Soviet Republic, and was preparing for the occasion, but the Soviet authorities opted not to award Perini, a foreign citizen, with this prestigious status.

=== Great Purge ===
In 1937, Perini's son, Ferdinand Inochenz, who lived in Bryansk with his spouse and two kids, was exiled as part of the Great Purge. Also exiled was the spouse of Perini's daughter, an engineer at the metallurgy factory in Taganrog. The fate of Perini's daughter is unknown. Also in 1937, Hrynewski was exiled to Siberia at the age of 68. He did not return. Hrynewski did not have children or relatives succeeding him, and his rich archives and art legacy was almost entirely lost.

Perini was also forced to leave the Soviet Union and sold everything she had to move first to Turin and then to Nice, where her sister had a guesthouse. Perini died the following year in Nice.
