= Mkhedruli (disambiguation) =

Mkhedruli is the current Georgian script.

Mkhedruli (Georgian: მხედრული, literally, "of horseman") may also refer to:

- Mkhedruli, a Georgian dance
- "Mkhedruli", a Georgian folk song
