= Simd (dance) =

Ossetian folk dance created by Georgians

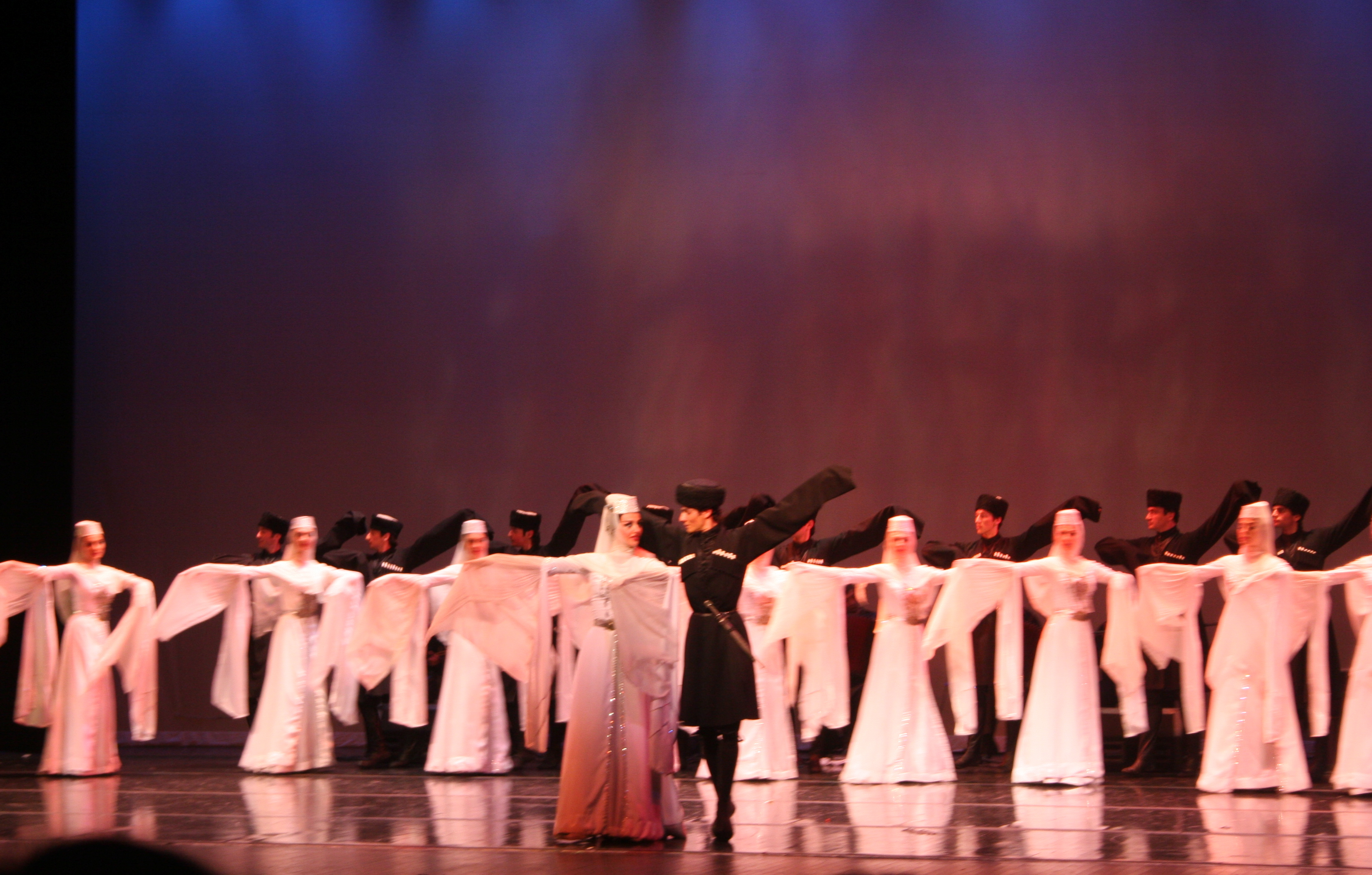
- Simd performed by Sukhishvili Ensemble
- Medium: Dance
- Originating culture: Ossetian

The Simd (Iron Ossetic: симд) is an Ossetian folk group dance. Time signature 4/4, 2/4. The beauty of Simd is in the strict graphic outline of the dance, the contrast between black and white costumes, the softness of movements, the strictness of line formations, and the harmony created by all of the above.

In South Ossetia there is the State song and dance ensemble "Simd".

== See also ==
- Georgian dance
