= Henryk Hryniewski =

Polish-Georgian painter, graphic artist, and illustrator

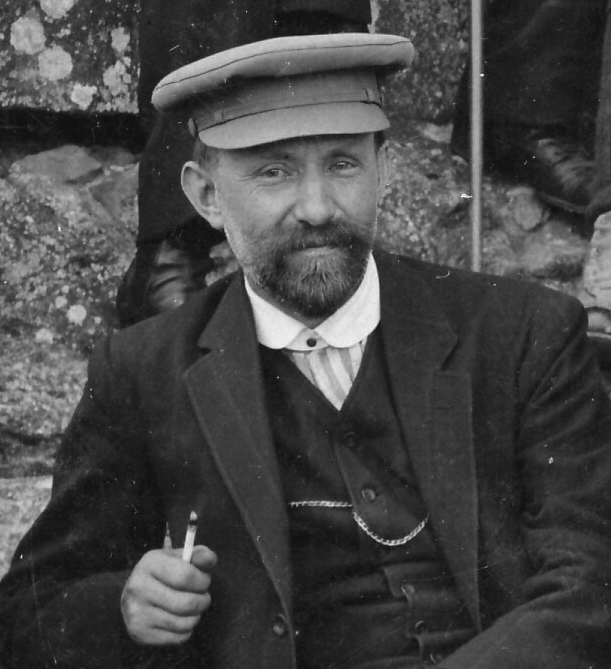
Henryk Hryniewski, June 1914

Henryk Hryniewski (Georgian: ჰენრიხ ჰრინევსკი; Russian: Генрих Викторович Гриневский; 22 November 1869 – 4 March 1937) was a Polish-Georgian painter, graphic artist, and illustrator. He was also known as a scholar and an educator of traditional Georgian architecture. He was arrested and executed during Joseph Stalin’s Great Purge. Few of his original work survive.

Hryniewski was born into a family of an exiled Polish patriot in the western Georgian city of Kutaisi, then part of the Russian Empire. From 1895 to 1898, he studied art and architecture at Florence and Karlsruhe. In 1898, he settled in Tiflis (Tbilisi) where he painted and taught. He directed the Tiflis Arts School from 1918 and 1921 and helped transform it into the Georgian Academy of Fine Arts, of which he became a professor in 1922 and vice-rector in 1927.

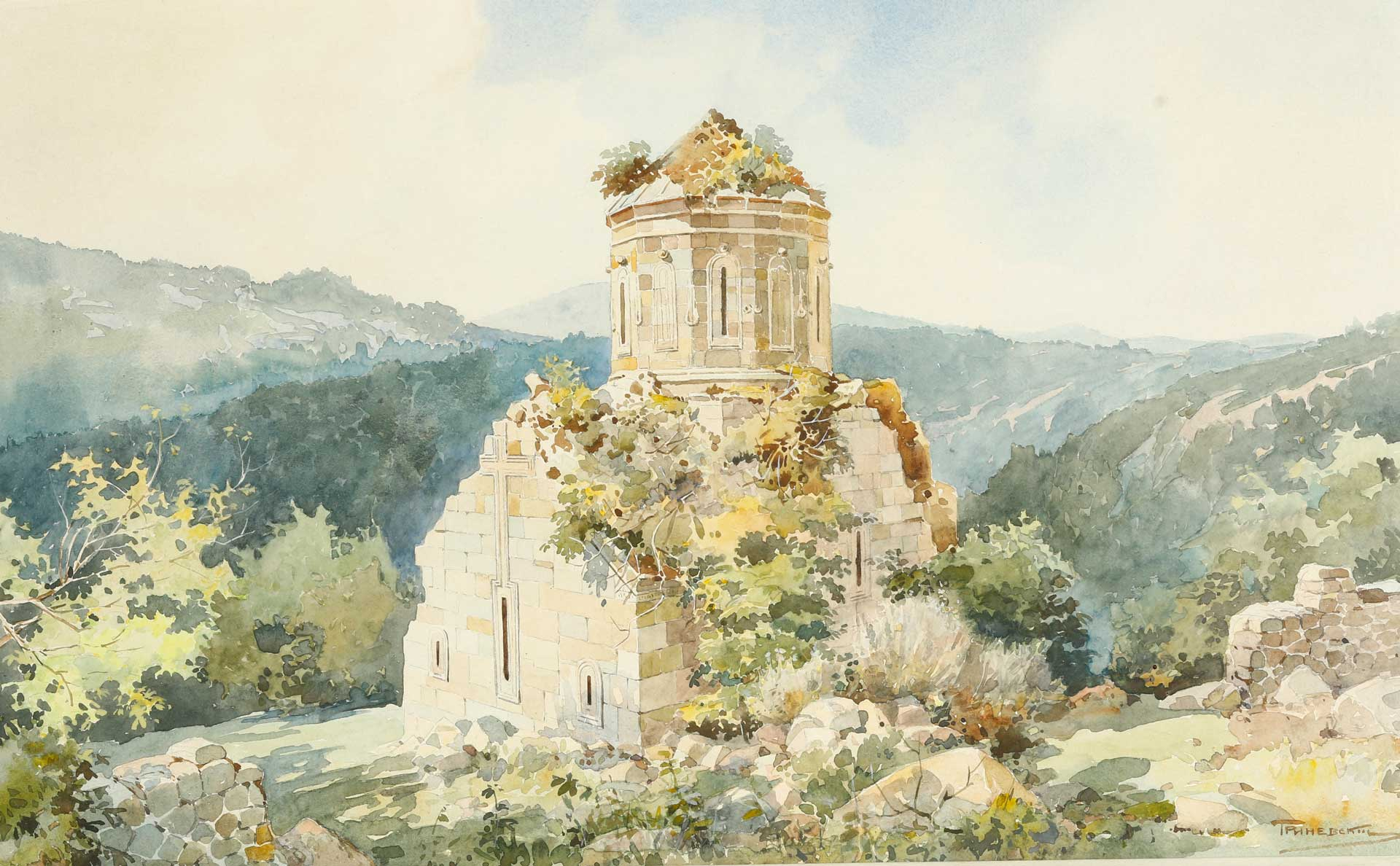
"Bieti Church", depiction of the eponymous ruined Georgian Orthodox Church by Hryniewski, 1901

Hryniewski was involved in the major cultural projects of the time; he was instrumental in organizing a museum of the history of Tbilisi and was a member of a special commission for protection of the city's cultural heritage. He studied Georgian folk and church architecture and produced "Old Architecture of Georgia," an album of aquarelles, as well as a comprehensive analysis of traditional Georgian ornate art and a textbook on linear perspectives and theory of shadows. Hrynievski’s illustrations regularly appeared in the Georgian press and in editions the works of leading Georgian writers, especially those of Ilia Chavchavadze. He also created an iconostasis for the Kashveti Church of St. George and coauthored the project of the Georgian Bank of Nobility office (presently the National Parliamentary Library of Georgia). He opposed a program of ideological reforms in the Tbilisi State Academy of Arts (formerly the Tbilisi Academy of Fine Arts) pushed for by the Soviet authorities. Hryniewski was arrested and shot in a 1937 repression wave. NKVD officers destroyed his studio and a large number of his works. Hryniewski’s wife Maria Perini (1873-1939), an Italian dancer and a founder of the first ballet studio in Tbilisi was immediately exiled from Georgia after her husband’s arrest.
