= Nino Ramishvili =

Georgian ballet dancer and ballet master (1910–2000)

- Born: 19 January 1910; Tiflis, Russian Empire
- Died: 6 September 2000 (aged 90); Tbilisi, Georgia
- Occupations: Ballet dancer, choreographer
- Known for: Co-founder of Sukhishvili Georgian National Ballet
- Awards: Hero of Socialist Labor; People's Artist of the USSR; Shota Rustaveli Prize

Nino Shalvovna Ramishvili (Georgian: ნინო შალვას ასული რამიშვილი; 19 January 1910 – 6 September 2000) was a Soviet and Georgian ballet dancer, choreographer, and co-founder of the Sukhishvili Georgian National Ballet. She was a recipients of the titles People's Artist of the Georgian SSR in 1953, People's Artist of the USSR in 1963, and Hero of Socialist Labour in 1990.

== Career ==
From 1922 to 1927, Ramishvili studied at the ballet school of Maria Perini in Tbilisi.

From 1927 to 1936, she was the soloist of the ballet theater Paliashvili, where she performed in productions of Abesalom and Eteri, Daisi, The Tale of Shota Rustaveli, Keto and Kote, and Tsisana.

In 1945, together with her husband Iliko Sukhishvili, Ramishvili founded the Sukhishvili Georgian National Ballet, initially called the Georgian State Dance Company, where she became soloist and dance teacher until 1972.

In 1972, she became chief choreographer of the Sukhishvili Georgian National Ballet.

The Georgian National Ballet has been represented by world's many well-known impresarios and companies. The Georgian National Ballet has appeared at the Albert Hall, The Coliseum, The Metropolitan Opera, Madison Square, and dozens of famous venues. In 1967, La Scala welcomed them - it is the first and the only time a folklore group was given a chance to perform there. The curtain was lifted 14 times, a record. The costumes were designed by Simon (Soliko) Virsaladze (1908-1989).

== See also ==
- Roziya Karimova
- Guli Hamroyeva
