= Perkhuli =

Georgian folk dance

Perkhuli (Georgian: ფერხული) is a Georgian predominantly male folk round dance. Of at least 20 versions of the dance, "multi-level" perkhuli is one of the most popular forms, performed by a group of dancers standing on the other group's shoulders, with music in 3/4 time. Another version of perkhuli consists of slow and fast rounds, danced to music in 4/4 time. The northwestern mountainous region of Svaneti is particularly rich in the perkhuli repertoire.

The dance was inscribed on the Intangible Cultural Heritage of Georgia list in 2013.

== See also ==
- Georgian dance
