= Nikoloz Vacheishvili =

Georgian art scholar, politician

Nikoloz (Nika) Vacheishvili (Georgian: ნიკოლოზ ვაჩეიშვილი) (born 26 May 1968 in Tbilisi) is a Georgian art scholar, politician and the former Minister of Culture, Heritage Preservation and Sport in the Cabinet of Georgia. He was appointed to the position after the reformation of the Cabinet by Prime Minister Lado Gurgenidze on 30 January 2008. Vacheishvili left the position in October 2008 when the new premier Grigol Mgaloblishvili appointed diplomat Grigol Vashadze as the Culture Minister, as part of a minor reshuffle of the Cabinet. He served as Director General of the National Agency for Cultural Heritage Preservation of Georgia from November 2008 until his resignation on 18 January 2013.
