= Bieti Monastery =

- Location within Georgia

Religion
- Affiliation: Georgian Orthodox
- Ecclesiastical or organisational status: Active

Location
- Location: Bieti, South Ossetia/Shida Kartli, Georgia
- Coordinates: 42.190361°N 44.216255°E

Architecture
- Type: hall church

The Bieti Monastery (Georgian: ბიეთის მონასტერი, romanized: bietis monast'eri) is a half-ruined medieval Georgian Orthodox monastery in the historical Shida Kartli region, located near the village of Bieti in what is now the disputed territory of South Ossetia. It is built in a hall church plan and partially carved into rock. The church is inscribed on the list of Georgia's Immovable Cultural Monuments of National Significance. There is another medieval Georgian church known as Bieti situated in Samtskhe-Javakheti in southern Georgia.

The monastery lies on a wooded cliff in the upper Mejuda valley, a tributary of the Greater Liakhvi. Based on its architectural features and paleography of the church inscription, the building is dated to the 9th century. In historical literature it is first mentioned by Prince Vakhushti of Kartli in his 1745 Description of the Kingdom of Georgia as a functioning monastery with an abbot residing there.

The Bieti monastery is a hall church design, with a non-projecting apse. It is built of limestone and cobblestone and faced with sandstone slabs. The northern part of the church is cut into the adjacent rock in two tiers. A long, narrow and now-damaged annex on the south is contemporaneous with the church, while a wide hall at the southern end is a late medieval construction. Nearby are monks' cells and a refectory. The eastern façade bore an inscription in the medieval Georgian asomtavruli script, commemorating Ioane, son of Bakur Qanchaeli, "the lord and patron of this holy church". Another inscription, engraved on a small stone adjacent to the carved cross, mention Vache and Beshken, probably members of the same Qanchaeli family. Both inscriptions were, in 1912, brought for safekeeping in Tbilisi, where they are preserved at the Georgian National Museum.
