= Khorumi =

Type of dance

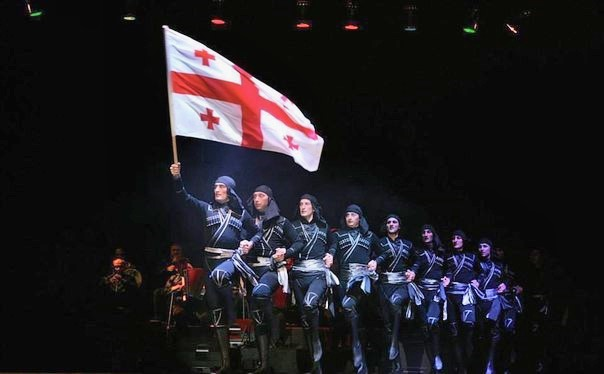
Khorumi dance performed by the Sukhishvili Georgian National Ballet

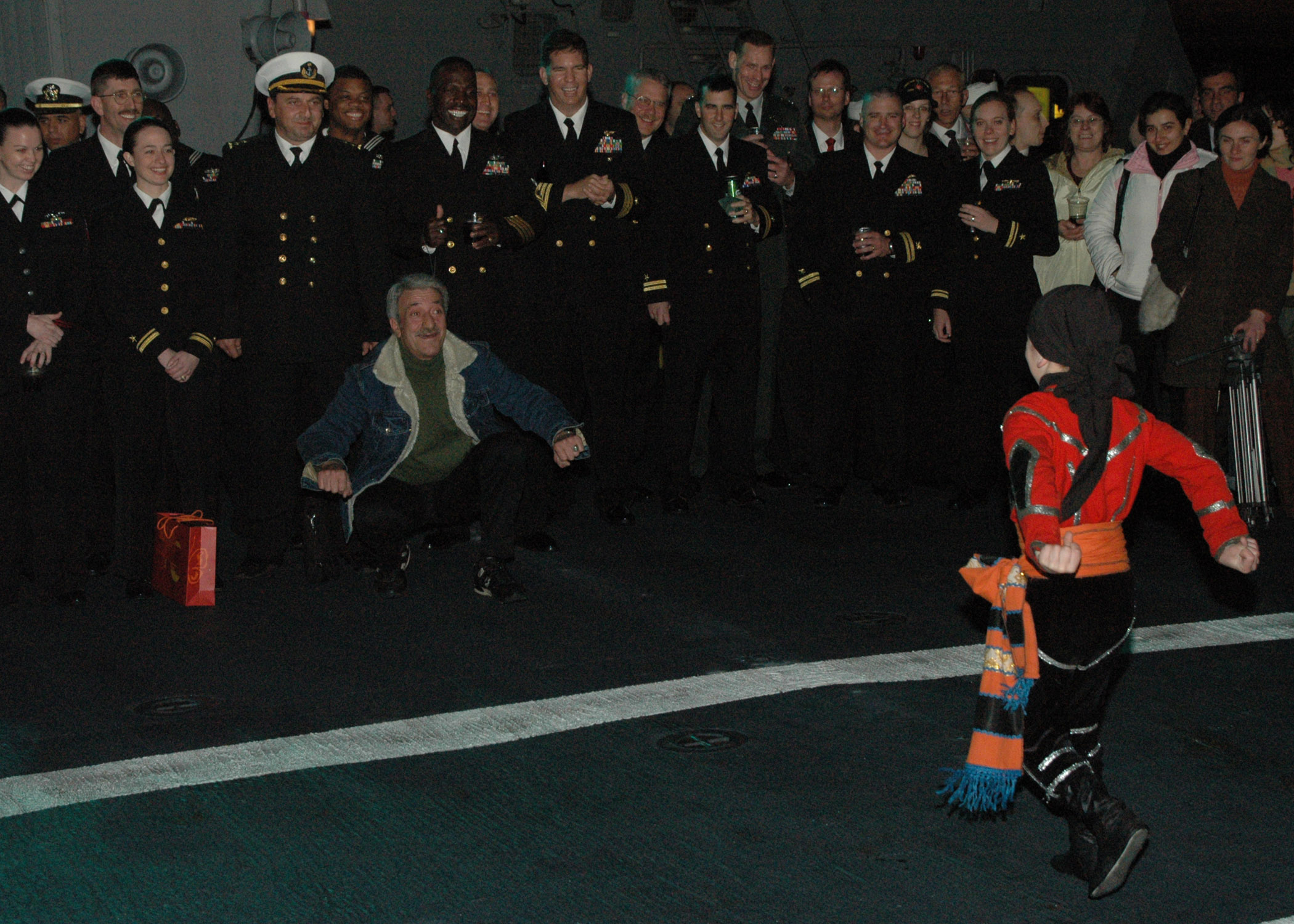
Sailors watch Georgian dancer perform a Khorumi dance

The Khorumi (Georgian: ხორუმი) is a war dance that originated in the region of Adjara, which is located in the southwestern region of Georgia. The dance was originally performed by only a few men. However, over time it has grown in scale. In today's version of the Khorumi, 30 to 40 dancers can participate. The dance was inscribed on the Intangible Cultural Heritage of Georgia list in 2013.

Although the number of performers changed, the content of the dance is still the same. The dance brings to life the Georgian army of the past centuries. A few men who are searching the area for a campsite and enemy camps perform the initial "prelude" to the dance. Afterwards, they call the army onto the battlefield. The exit of the army is quite breathtaking. Its strength, simple but distinctive movements and the precision of lines create a sense of awe on stage. The dance incorporates in itself the themes of search, war, and the celebration of victory as well as courage and glory of Georgian soldiers. Since Georgia has seen many wars throughout its history, Khorumi is a call from the past and reminds us that in order to have peace, we must be ready for war.

== Musical features ==
Unlike the bulk of Georgian traditional dances, which are usually accompanied by choral polyphonic singing and clapping, Khorumi is traditionally accompanied by instruments, and is not accompanied by clapping. Drum (doli) and the bagpipe (chiboni) are two key instruments to accompany Khorumi. Another unique element of Khorumi is that it has a specific rhythm, based on five beat meter (3+2).

== See also ==
- Georgian dance
