= Razzoq Hamroyev =

Uzbek actor (1910–1981)

- Born: November 30, 1910; Tezguzar, Syr-Darya Oblast, Russian Empire
- Died: 5 May 1981 (aged 70); Tashkent, Uzbek SSR, Soviet Union
- Education: Uzbekistan State Institute of Arts and Culture
- Occupations: Actor; theater director; pedagogue
- Years active: 1932–1980
- Children: Javlon Hamroyev; Guli Hamroyeva

Razzoq Hamroyev (Note: Uzbek: Razzoq Hamroyev; Russian: Раззак Хамробоевич Хамраев, romanized: Razzak Khamroboyevich Khamrayev) (30 November 1910 – 5 May 1981) was a Soviet and Uzbek actor, theater director and pedagogue. People's Artist of the USSR (1969). Laureate of the Stalin Prize, second degree (1948).

== Biography ==
Razzoq Hamroyev was born on 15 May 1910 in Tezguzar. He graduated from school in Tezguzar. After graduating from the Tashkent Male Institute of Education in 1930, he left for distribution to Namangan, where he began to teach the Uzbek language and literature. At school, he organized a drama club, where he was a director and an actor at the same time.

Since 1931 – one of the organizers, actor, director, chief director (since 1934), artistic director of Namangan Musical Drama and Comedy Theatre named after Ali-Shir Nava'i.

In 1940 he studied at the directing courses at the Moscow Art Theatre.

From 1946 to the end of his life, he was an actor, director, and chief director (1959–1976) of the Uzbek Theater of Musical Drama and Comedy named after Mukimiy.

He staged performances in other theaters of the Uzbek SSR.

Since 1945 he starred in movies. He was member of the Union of Cinematographers of the Uzbek SSR.

In 1954, he graduated from the directing faculty of the Tashkent State Institute of Theatrical Art named after Alexander Nikolayevich Ostrovsky (now Uzbekistan State Institute of Arts and Culture).

Since 1954, he taught at the Tashkent State Institute of Theatrical Art named after Alexander Nikolayevich Ostrovsky, taught the course of directing (since 1978 – professor).

He was a member of the All-Union Communist Party of Bolsheviks (since 1945), Deputy of the Supreme Soviet of the Uzbek Soviet Socialist Republic of the 7th convocation.

Razzoq Hamroyev died on May 5, 1981 in Tashkent. He was buried at the Chigatai Memorial Cemetery.

=== Family ===
- Son – Javlon Hamroyev (1934–1997), actor. People's Artist of the Uzbek SSR (1975).
- Daughter – Guli Hamroyeva (b. 1946), ballet dancer, teacher. People's Artist of the Uzbek SSR (1983).
- Grandson – Bekzod Hamroyev (b. 1960), actor of the Uzbekfilm studio. Honored Artist of Uzbekistan (2012).
- Grandson – Ulug‘bek Hamroyev (b. 1970), cameraman, clip maker.
- Granddaughter – Nodira Hamroyeva (b. 1985), ballerina. Honored Artist of Uzbekistan (2010).

== Awards ==
- People's Artist of the Uzbek SSR (1950)
- Stalin Prize, second degree (1948)
- Order of the Badge of Honour (1950)
- People's Artist of the Uzbek SSR (1951)
- Order of the Red Banner of Labour (18 March 1959)
- People's Artist of the USSR (10 January 1969)
- State Hamza Prize (1970)
- Order of Friendship of Peoples (1980)
- Order of Outstanding Merit (Uzbekistan) (2003 – posthumously)
