= Çeng =

Musical instrument

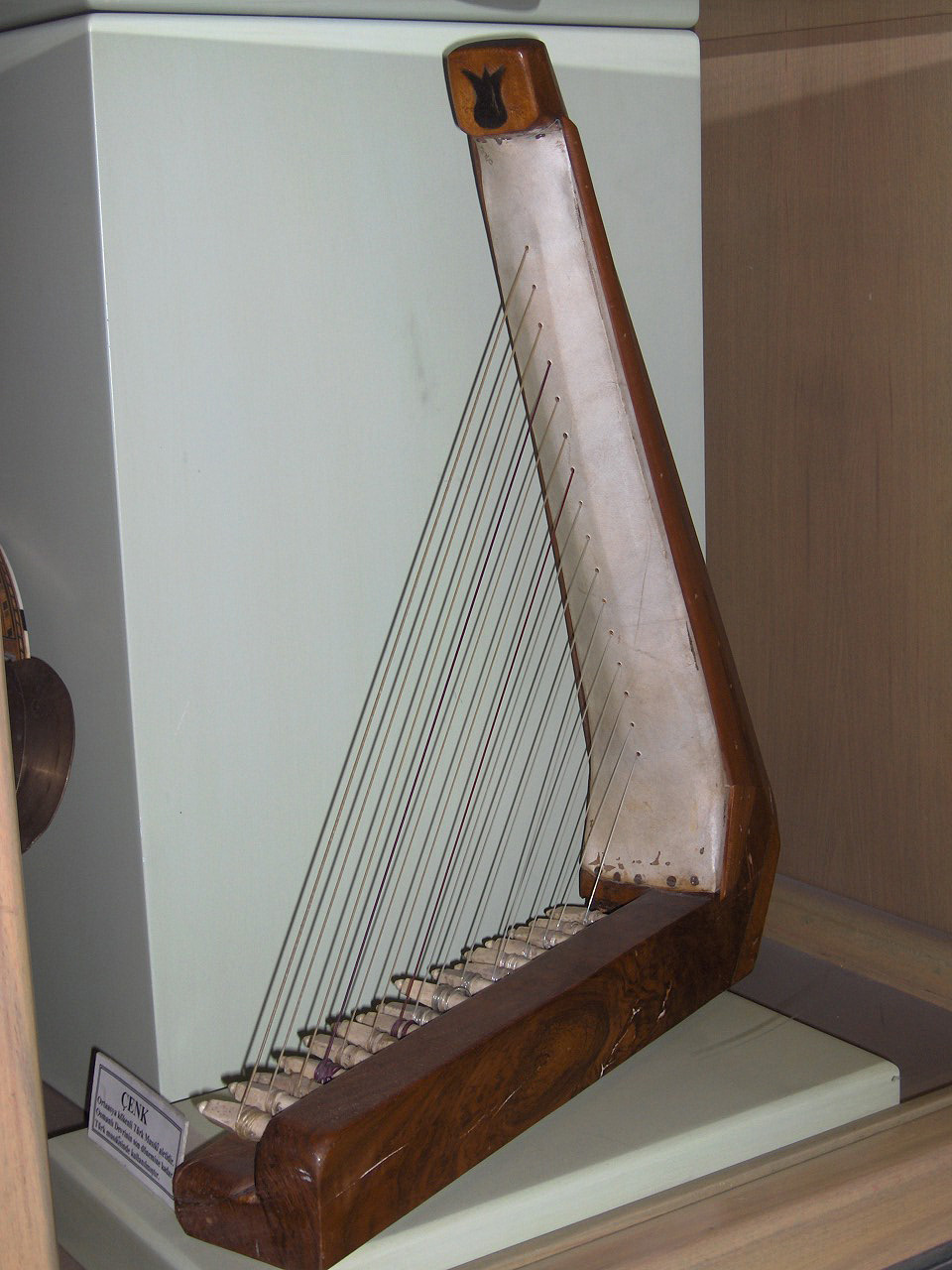
- Classification: string instrument
- Hornbostel–Sachs classification: 322.12 (Angular open harp)

Related instruments
- Çeng; Konghou; Harp; Chang (instrument)

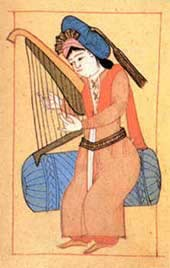
Miniature of an Ottoman çeng

The çeng is a Turkish harp. It was a popular Ottoman instrument until the last quarter of the 17th century.

The ancestor of the Ottoman harp is thought to be an instrument seen in ancient Assyrian tablets. While a similar instrument also appears in Egyptian drawings.

The çeng belongs to the family of instruments known in organology as "open harps", which are further divided into the "bow harps" and the "square harps". The çeng is in the latter groups.

== History ==
Early accounts of square harps are from 6000 years ago in the Middle East.

The origin of the Ottoman çeng was the Iranian çeng. But in Istanbul, the instrument gained certain features. The Persian manuscript, Kenzü't-Tuhaf, written in the 14th century, gives a good deal of information on the çeng. But the poetical work of the 15th-century poet Ahmed-i Dâî titled Çengname put the çeng in a very privileged place among the other Ottoman instruments. This was because no such work had ever been written – poetically or prosaically – about any other Ottoman instrument. Besides the "market paintings", which were made by folk painters outside the palace for European travelers, most of which are to day in European museums, there are many miniatures depicting the çeng along with other instruments, in albums such as the Sehinsahname, the Süleymanname, the Album of Ahmed I and the Surnâme-i Hümâyûn. A careful examination of these reveals the following:

1. The çeng was played by both men and women.
2. Miniatures depicting the çeng show it accompanying talks by poets and learned men than on the stage.
3. Though it is difficult to speak of a standard size of çeng, it becomes clear that there were two sizes of the instrument. The first, the "kucak çengi" (lap çeng) was small and played indoors, seated. The second was the "açık hava çengi", which was quite large and played standing up. The kucak çengi was played with the pegboard on the player's left knee; the açık hava çengi rested on a long foot that went between the player's legs, and tied around the waist by a belt attached to the lower part of its body (that is, the resonator).
4. The çeng's resonator was constructed in two ways, either curved or straight. While the curved resonator is encountered in Iranian, Arab, Uygur, Chinese and even Japanese miniatures, the straight resonator appears only in Ottoman miniatures.

Possibly, when the Ottomans adopted the çeng that came from Iran, another closed harp descended from the Phoenician harp was in use in the Byzantine period. After the Iranian-derived Ottoman çeng was abandoned, the above-mentioned triangular harp was in use in Istanbul, especially in some homes in the Pera district. The fact that in miniatures this instrument, which we can claim was never played in the palace, is shown in the hands of women in palace attire, is not difficult to explain. The market painters were not like the palace artists, who were closely familiar with palace life. For this reason, elements of palace life were mixed with those of outside life.

== Changi ==
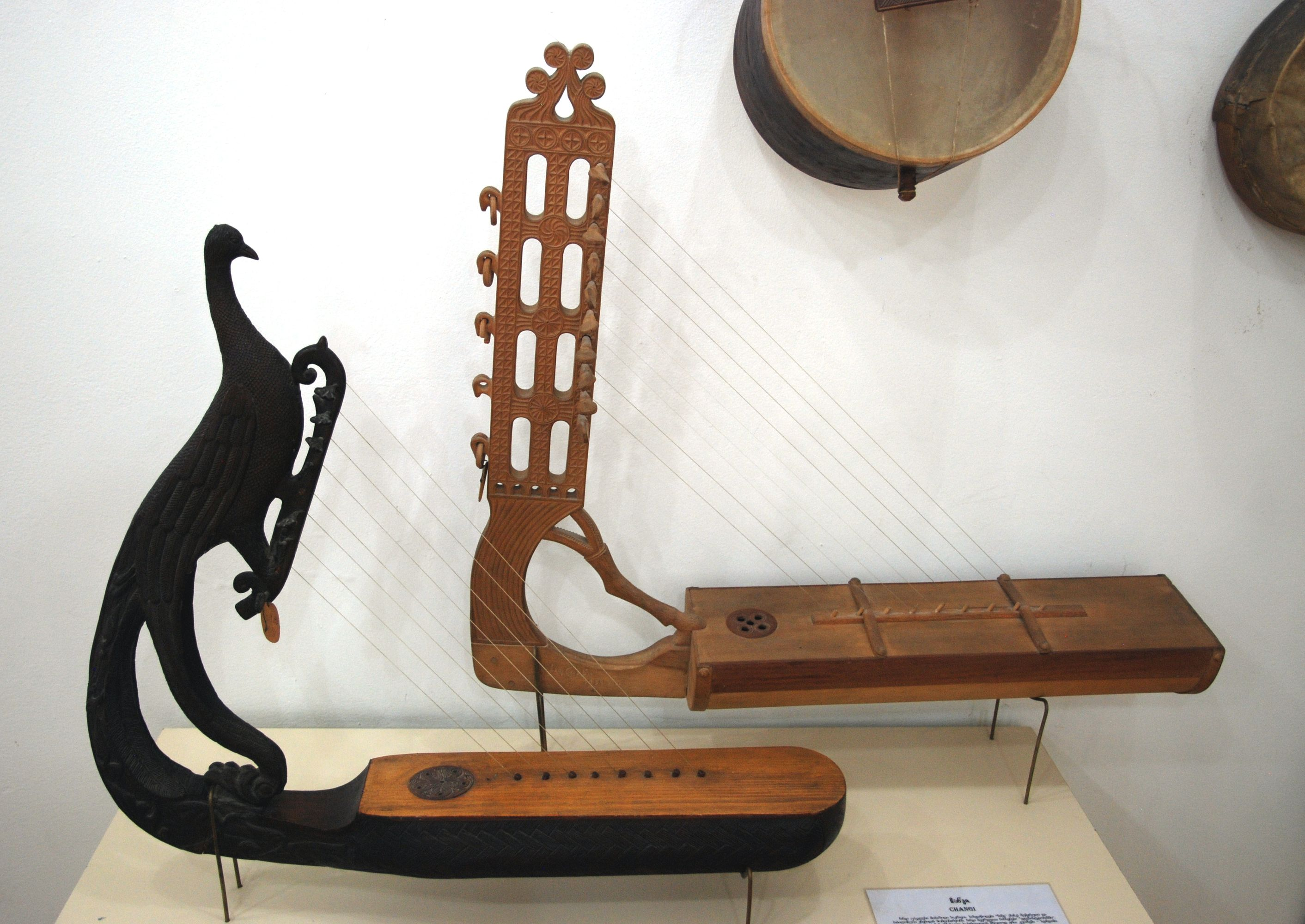
Changi

A Georgian traditional instrument called the changi (Georgian: ჩანგი) is preserved only in one region of Georgia: the Svaneti (western Svanetian Changi mountainous part). The changi consists of two main parts: body and supplementary elements, which are represented by keys and tuners. The body consists of horizontal and vertical parts. The horizontal part the resonator is made out of a long hollowed tree and has the shape of a semi-cylinder. Plate of about 4 mm with a small curvature in the middle is nailed onto it. The plate has six notches for buttons to fasten the strings, they are fastened at the same distance from the sides of the resonator. The vertical part is straight and flat. It has holes for the tuners. The tip of the vertical part is inserted into the horizontal part forming a right angle. On both parts small wooden sticks are nailed parallel to the strings. The changi is mainly made of softwood; the most popular material is fir, but sometimes pine is used. The changi has 6 or 7 strings. The tuning of a six-string Changi is "fa", "sol", "la", "si", "do", "re". The seven-string changi has the same tuning but its scale begins with "mi". Special proportions are kept by changi "Deer" the instrument makers when designing changi. It is mostly played by women and is generally used for accompaniment. Solo songs are often accompanied with it. But melodies performed on this instrument represent the transcription of Svanetian national "Saperkhulo" (a dance) melodies not the original instrumental music. Only one changi is used while accompanying solo melodies. Nevertheless, combining chuniri and changi into ensembles was quite frequent. The changi is quite popular in Svaneti. It was considered to be the instrument of "sorrow". According to the sayings, it was often played to comfort a person in his grief. There is a legend connected with Changi that tells us the story of an old man whose son was killed in a war and who found an expression of his grief in a sad melody of his changi. The changi, in the Svanetian language, is also called in Svanetian changi "Shimekvshe", which means a broken arm. The Svanetian changi is recognized to be one of the most ancient string instruments. It has existed since the 4th century B.C. It is worthy of note that one of the most ancient nations, the Sumerians, who lived in western Asia and are thought to have been closely connected with the ancestors of the Georgians, with ties of kinship, had a similar instrument that looked like the Svanetian harp. There is a supposition about the origin of the changi, according which it must have been originated from a bow. This weapon is not a particular nation's invention. Thus, the changi could have been invented independently in different nations. The instruments similar to Changi were widespread in many ancient Eastern counties: in Egypt, Shumereti, Babylon, Iran, China, Greece, etc.

- Tuning of the six-stringed changi: f – g – a – h – c1 – d1.
- Tuning of the seven-stringed changi: e – f – g – a – h – c1 – d1.

The traditional technique of making a Svanetian changi was inscribed on the Intangible Cultural Heritage of Georgia list in 2015.

== Ayumaa ==
Triangular harp of Abkhazia similar to the Georgian changi, with 14 horsehair strings. Formerly it was widespread as an instrument on which singers played their own accompaniments.

== Duadastanon ==
Triangular harp of Ossetia with a hollowed body and arc-shaped neck usually terminating in a curved horse's head (or an aurochs's head). The instrument has 12 diatonically tuned horsehair strings of which eight (treble) are white and four (bass) black. The duadastanon was regarded as the instrument of heroes and only men were allowed to play it, accompanying the recitation of the Nart epic tales, as weIl as lyrical, love and children's songs.

== Tor-sapl-yukh ==
A horizontal angular harp belonging to the Mansi people. The body is hollowed out of a piece of wood, one end of it is bent upwards forming a neck, sometimes adorned with a carved bird's head. It has from five to nine (usually eight) strings producing a diatonic scale, played by plucking.

== Modern times ==
In the late 20th century, instrument makers and performers began to revive the çeng, with newer designs incorporating advanced tuning mechanisms such as those found on the kanun. Tone bending is also possible, by pressing on the string behind the bridge. Whereas the soundbox on the old çeng was on the upper part of the instrument, modern instruments have the soundbox on the lower part.

In 1995, Fikret Karakaya, a kemençe player from Turkey, made a çeng using the descriptions in the masnavi "Çengname" by the Turkish poet Ahmed-i Dai, and from Iranian and Ottoman miniatures from the 15th and 16th centuries. He presently plays and records with the instrument.

The second çeng in Turkey was recently made by Mehmet Soylemez, an instrument maker and master's degree graduate student at Istanbul Technical University, for Şirin Pancaroğlu, the primary harpist of Turkey. She has started to explore this ancient instrument and will soon record with it.

In the United States, New England Conservatory of Music ethnomusicology professor Robert Labaree plays and records with the instrument.

== See also ==
- Konghou
- Music of Egypt
