= Guli Hamroyeva =

Uzbek ballerina

- Born: Guli Razzoqovna Hamroyeva; December 2, 1946; Tashkent, Uzbek SSR, USSR
- Died: April 16, 2023 (aged 76)
- Occupations: ballet artist, actress, ballet teacher

Guli Razzakovna Khamrayeva (Uzbek: Guli Razzoqovna Hamroyeva; born on December 2, 1946, Tashkent – April 16, 2023) was a ballet artist and educator whose career was based at the A. Navoi Opera and Ballet Theater (Tashkent). She was awarded the title of People's Artist of the Uzbek SSR in 1983.

== Biography ==
She was the daughter of the actor Razzoq Hamroyev. In 1966, she graduated from the Tashkent Choreographic School with a degree in "ballet artist" and was subsequently accepted into the ballet troupe of the Navoi Opera and Ballet Theater.

She performed leading roles in productions such as "The Fountain of Bakhchisarai" (Zarema), "Don Quixote" (Kitri), "Esmeralda", "Spartacus" (Aegina), "Lyubovniy talisman" (Chundari), "Giselle" (Myrtha), "Swan Lake" (Spanish Dance, Odette-Odile), "Cinderella" (Stepmother), "Ispanskiye miniatyuri" (Spanish Woman), "Carmen" (Carmen), "Le Corsaire" (Gulnara), "Priklyucheniya Nasreddina", "Cleopatra" (Cleopatra), and "Ojivshiye miniatyuri" (Kanizak). She also appeared in the films "Dilorom" (Dilorom) and "Semurg" (Parizod). A film titled "Boléro" (1995) was dedicated to the life and art of the ballerina.

In 2001, she graduated from the Tashkent State Higher School of Choreography and National Dance with a degree in "director-choreographer". She served as a ballet director from 2000 to 2002 and, from 2002 onwards, as a pedagogical rehearsal coach at the theater. Since 2002, she has been the rector of the Tashkent State Higher School of National Dance and Choreography (now the State Academy of Choreography of Uzbekistan). She died on April 16, 2023, at the age of 76.

== Family ==
- Her husband was ballet artist Vadim Gellert (born in 1967), a Merited Artist of the Republic of Uzbekistan.
- Her daughter Nadira Khamraeva – is a ballet artist, Honored Artist of Uzbekistan.
- Guzal - works in the fashion industry and lives in Italy.

== See also ==
- Roziya Karimova
