= Roziya Karimova =

Uzbek ballet dancer

- Born: Roziya Zaripovna Karimova; March 18, 1916; Kazan, Russian Empire
- Died: March 15, 2011 (aged 94); Tashkent, Uzbekistan
- Occupations: ballet dancer, choreographer, actress, singer
- Awards: Honored Artist of the Uzbek SSR (1942); People's Artist of the Uzbek SSR (1950); Laureate of the State Hamza Prize; Order of "Respected by the People and Homeland"; Order of the "Badge of Honor" (May 31, 1937); Two Medals "For Distinguished Labour" (1951 and 1959); Order of “El-xurmati”

Roziya Zaripovna Karimova (born March 18, 1916, in Kazan, Russian Empire — March 15, 2011, in Tashkent, Uzbekistan) was a Soviet and Uzbek ballet artist, singer, actress, choreographer, performer of Uzbek folk dances, art historian, scholar, and writer. She was awarded the title of People's Artist of the Uzbek SSR in 1950.

== Biography ==
She was born in 1916 in the city of Kazan of the Russian Empire in the family of a Tatar merchant. In 1929, she entered the preparatory department of the Fergana Medical Technical School, where she actively participated in amateur artistic activities and led a club. In 1930, due to her outstanding performances in amateur events, she was directed to the theater studio of the Samarkand Theater by the order of the Council of People's Commissars of the Uzbek SSR. She studied and worked there simultaneously. Later, the theater from Samarkand was transferred to Tashkent and became the Uzbek Academic Theater of Opera and Ballet, named after Alisher Navoi. She was an artist of this theater through her entire creative career.

In 1937, for her performance of folk dances during the Moscow Arts Decade, she was awarded the Order of the Badge of Honor. In 1939, for her artistic service to the workers of the Great Fergana Canal, she was awarded the "Medal for Labor Valor". In 1942, for her performances in the operas "Davron ata", "Меч Узбекистана", "Leyli and Majnun," and "Gulsara," she was given the title of Honored Artist of the Uzbek SSR.

During the Great Patriotic War, as part of the artists from Uzbekistan, she performed concerts in hospitals and on the front lines for the Red Army soldiers. In 1943, as part of a group of Uzbekistan's masters, she participated in a solemn concert in front of the heads of the anti-Hitler coalition, Roosevelt, Churchill, and Stalin in Tehran.

In 1950, for her contributions to Uzbek art and on the occasion of the 25th anniversary of the Uzbek SSR, she was awarded the honorary title of People's Artist of the Uzbek SSR. In 1951 and 1959, she was awarded the Medal "For Distinguished Labour". She was a laureate of international awards and the author of 17 books and textbooks on the history and theory of Uzbek dance.

She died on 15 March 2011, in Tashkent.

== Awards and titles ==
- Honored Artist of the Uzbek SSR (1942)
- People's Artist of the Uzbek SSR (24 February 1950)
- State Hamza Prize (1983)
- Order of the Badge of Honor (31 May 1937)
- Medal "For Distinguished Labour" (6 December 1951 and 18 March 1959)
- "El-yurt hurmati" ordeni (27 August 1998)

== See also ==
Guli Hamroyeva
