= Iliko Sukhishvili =

Georgian dancer and choreographer (1907–1985)

- ილიკო სუხიშვილი
- Born: 4 April 1907; Mejvriskhevi, near Gori, Tiflis Governorate, Russian Empire
- Died: 24 March 1985 (aged 77); Tbilisi, Georgian SSR, Soviet Union
- Resting place: Didube Pantheon, Tbilisi
- Occupations: Dancer, choreographer
- Years active: 1924–1985
- Spouse: Nino Ramishvili (m. 1930)
- Children: Tengiz Sukhishvili

Ilia "Iliko" Ilias dze Sukhishvili (Georgian: ილიკო სუხიშვილი; 4 April 1907 – 24 March 1985) was a Georgian dancer and choreographer who, together with his wife Nino Ramishvili, founded the Georgian State Dance Company (today the Sukhishvili Georgian National Ballet) in 1945. A People's Artist of the USSR, he served as the ensemble's principal dancer and artistic director for the rest of his life and is regarded as one of the founders of Georgian stage folk dance.

== Early life and career ==
Sukhishvili was born on 4 April 1907 in the village of Mejvriskhevi, near Gori in what was then the Tiflis Governorate of the Russian Empire. He trained in Georgian folk dance and at the Tbilisi ballet school of Maria Perini, and from 1926 danced with the Tbilisi Opera and Ballet Theatre, where he later became a soloist and ballet-master. In the early 1930s he further studied in Moscow, working at the Bolshoi Theatre as an assistant to the ballet-master Kasian Goleizovsky. In 1935 he won a medal as a laureate of a world festival of folk-dance performers held in London, and from 1939 to 1941 he was a soloist of the Alexandrov Ensemble.

== Georgian State Dance Company ==
In 1945 Sukhishvili and Nino Ramishvili founded the Georgian State Dance Company, the ensemble now known as the Sukhishvili Georgian National Ballet. Drawing on Georgian folk tradition, Sukhishvili choreographed many of the dances that became the company's signature repertoire and remained its artistic director and chief choreographer until his death. Under the couple's direction the ensemble toured internationally and performed in dozens of countries, becoming one of the best-known folk-dance companies in the world.

== Awards and honours ==
- Order of the Badge of Honour (1937)
- Honored Artist of the Georgian SSR (1943)
- People's Artist of the Georgian SSR (1948)
- Stalin Prize, First Class (1949)
- People's Artist of the USSR (1958)
- Order of Lenin (1981)
- Shota Rustaveli State Prize of the Georgian SSR (1973)
- Honorary Citizen of Tbilisi (1981)

== Personal life ==
Sukhishvili was married to the dancer and choreographer Nino Ramishvili (1910–2000), with whom he founded and led the ensemble. Their son, Tengiz Sukhishvili (1938–2007), and later their grandson Iliko Sukhishvili Jr. (born 1972) went on to direct the company. Sukhishvili died in Tbilisi on 24 March 1985 and was buried at the Didube Pantheon.
