= Gandagana =

Gandagana (Georgian: განდაგანა) is a popular Georgian folk song and a traditional dance from the Adjara region. It is a significant piece of Georgian cultural heritage, often performed in a traditional dance style called Acharuli Gandagana.

== Description ==
The lyrics center on two lovers who are forced to separate by their families and societal conventions, expressing their unfulfilled longing and heartache. The haunting refrain "Tarnanani ninano" in the chorus is said to echo an "eternal farewell" between the lovers. It is an example of Georgian vocal polyphony, a musical tradition recognized as a Masterpiece of the Oral and Intangible Heritage of Humanity by UNESCO.

== Versions ==
"Gandagana" has gained immense modern popularity through various covers and remixes.

- Traditional Version: The Basiani Ensemble and similar folk groups perform authentic renditions, showcasing the song's traditional beauty.
- Karmate Version: A well-known version was created by the Turkish folk band Karmate, which released it as a Turkish song on their album Nayino.
- Trap Remix (Also Known as Acharuli Gandagana): The song is most famous online in its "trap remix" versions and has gone viral for its catchy beat and was used in various internet videos and dance performances.

== Lyrics ==
Georgian	English Translation
Gogov gogov kiskisa Ak chamodi ʒklis pirsa Ʒkali masvi kokita Gamaǯgeni kocnita Tarnanani ninano Ʒkals napoti Cmaohkonda Alvisi xis camona tvali Dadek napotomiambe Sayvarlis semonatvali Tarnanani ninano Naliaze me ver eval Kibis uku debelio Me ikedan verçamoval Şhenze çuuxutebelio Tarnanani ninano Taroze makvs xuti vaşli Sami şhen şiginaxeo Baxçaşi rom pipinebdi Pancridan diginaxeo	Girl, girl giggling (giggling) Come here to the water's edge Make me drink water with his jug, Feed me with kisses Tarnanani ninano The water has turned from the poplar tree, was taking the chip away. Stop stream; Tell me what my beloved said! Tarnanani ninano I can not go to the warehouse; without imposing stairs. I can't get down from there; Without holding you .. Tarnanani ninano I have five apples on the shelf, I kept the three for you You were spinning four in the garden; I saw you through the window

== See also ==
- Georgian cultural heritage
