= Bieti church =

Church in Akhaltsikhe, Georgia

Bieti church of the Mother of God
- ბიეთის ღვთისმშობლის ეკლესია
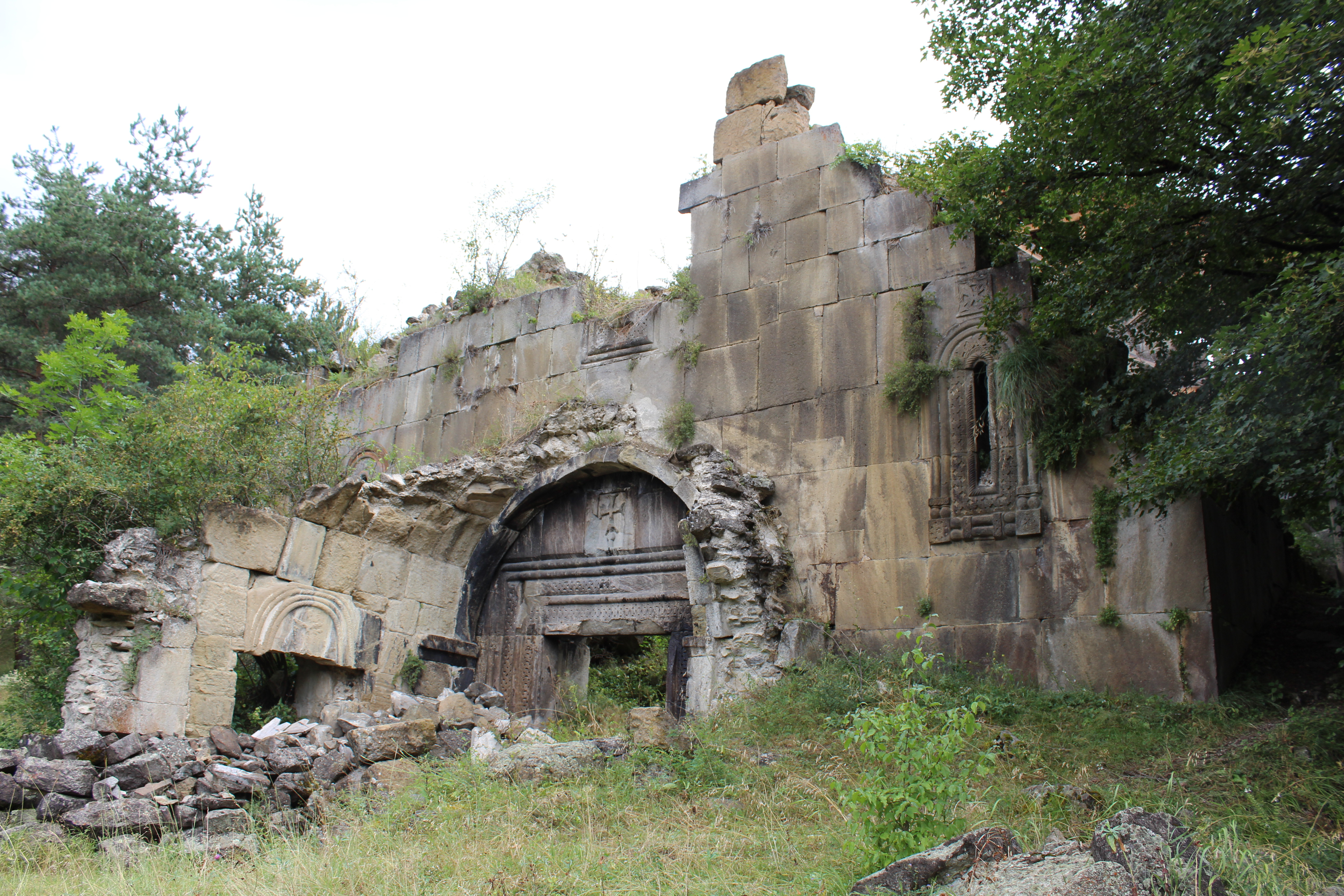
- Ruins of the Bieti church.
- Interactive map of Bieti church of the Mother of God
- Location: Akhaltsikhe Municipality, Mtskheta-Mtianeti, Georgia
- Coordinates: 41.743056°N 43.105833°E
- Type: Cross-in-square church (ruined)

The Bieti church of the Mother of God (Georgian: ბიეთის ღვთისმშობლის ეკლესია, romanized: bietis ghvtismshoblis ek'lesia) is a ruined Georgian Orthodox church in the Akhaltsikhe Municipality in Georgia's south-central region of Samtskhe-Javakheti. Dated to the latter half of the 14th century, the Bieti church was built in a domed cross-in-square plan. After the dome collapsed in 1930, only the conch of the sanctuary and pastophoria remained standing. After some preparatory cleaning and conservation works, reconstruction was commenced in 2019. The church is inscribed on the list of Georgia's Immovable Cultural Monuments of National Significance. There is another medieval Georgian church known as Bieti situated in what is now the disputed territory of South Ossetia.

== History ==
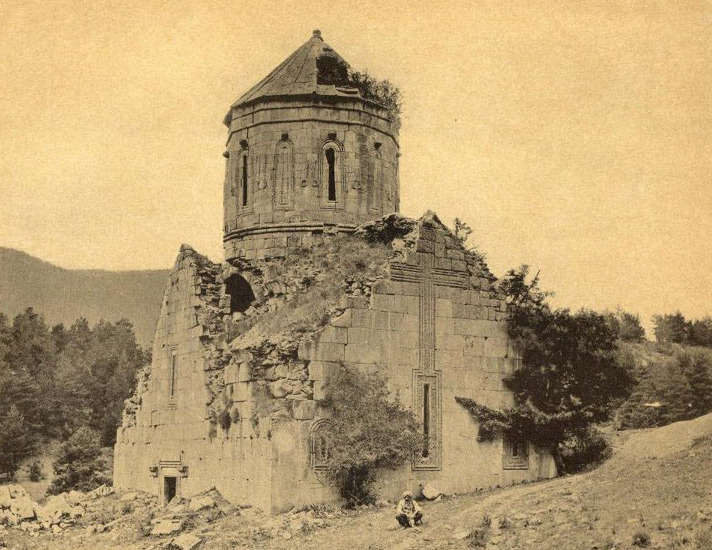
The Bieti church photographed by Dmitry Yermakov c. 1899.

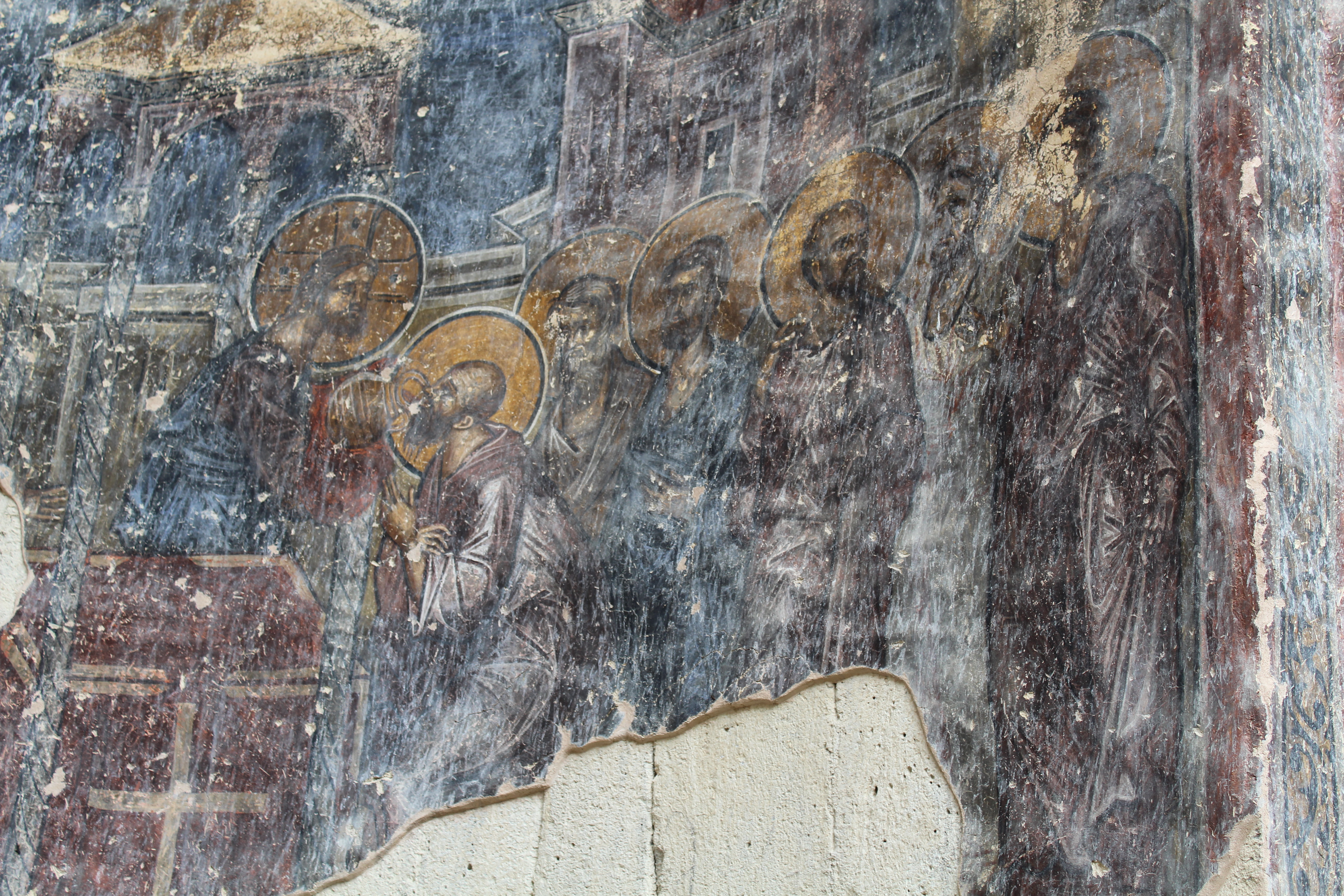
Fragments of the wall paintings.

The Bieti church is located on the territory of a now-extinct eponymous village in the Tsinaubani gorge, some 2 km north of the modern village of Gurkeli in the Akhaltsikhe Municipality in Samtskhe-Javakheti. Judging from the style, the church might have been built in the late 14th century. A chapel was annexed to the north by the certain Zaal Tokhasdze in 1493. The area was part of the medieval province of Samtskhe, which became largely Muslim during the Ottoman rule between 1578 and 1829. The church lapsed in oblivion and was brought to scholarly attention only in the late 19th century by Dimitri Bakradze and Ekvtime Taqaishvili. Already heavily damaged, the building fell to ruin after the dome collapsed in 1930. After some preliminary cleaning and conservation works at the church, a major reconstruction program was launched in 2019 and is projected to be completed in three years.

== Layout ==
The Bieti church, measuring 11.8 × 17.7 m, was built of dressed stone in a cross-in-square plan, with the centrally located and outsized dome and semicircular apse with the deep bema. The dome, all of the arches and vaults as well as the upper part of the apse have collapsed, their ruins filling up the interior. Only the conch of the sanctuary and the pastophoria survive. The eastern wall still retains fragments of medieval frescoes influenced by the late Byzantine Palaeologan art. The outer walls were decorated with stone carvings and bore inscriptions in the medieval Georgian asomtavruli script. One of them, now lost, commemorated the construction of the chapel in 1493. The art historian Vakhtang Beridze classifies the church as belonging to a group of the domed churches of medieval Samtskhe, which also includes Sapara, Zarzma, and Chule.
