= Simon Virsaladze =

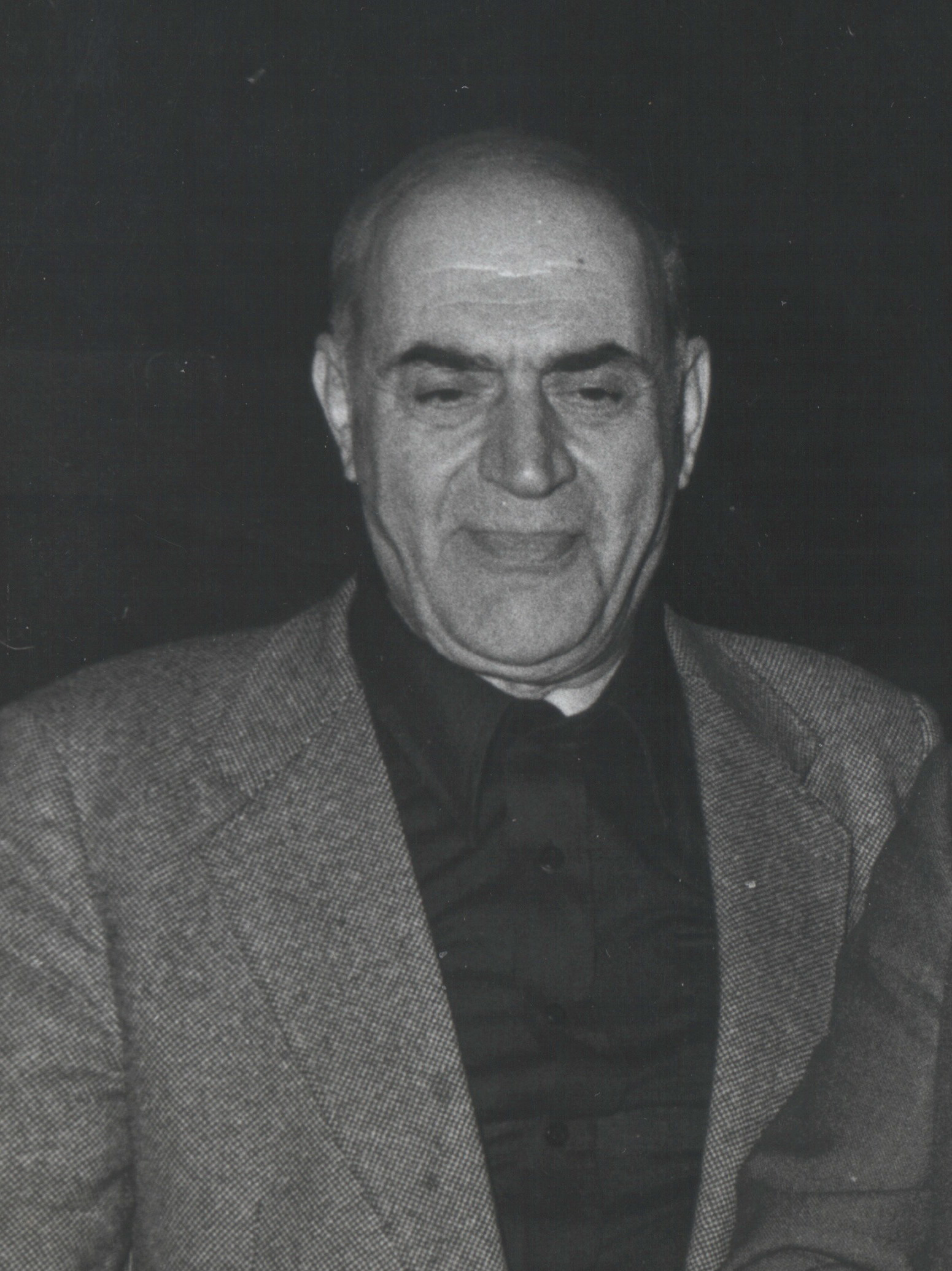
Simon Virsaladze at the end of the 1970s in Rome.

Simon (Soliko) Virsaladze (Georgian: სოლომონ(სოლიკო) ვირსალაძე; 13 January 1909 – 7 February 1989) was a Georgian and one of the Soviet Union's leading designers of ballet, film and opera. He also worked as collaborator with the founders of Georgian National Ballet company, Iliko Sukhishvili and Nino Ramishvili, in the creation of classic Georgian costumes.

== Life and career ==
He was born in Tbilisi on 13 January 1909. As a child he studied both ballet and art, and although he went on to design for plays, operas, and films it is as a ballet designer that he made his name. He was chief designer for the Zacharia Paliashvili Theatre for Opera and Ballet in Tbilisi (1932–1936) and designed Vakhtang Chabukiani's The Heart of the Hills (1938) for the Kirov in Leningrad, where he eventually became chief designer (1945–1962). He also designed for the Maly Theatre Ballet and the Novosibirsk Theatre. He was chief designer of the Bolshoi Ballet in Moscow from 1964 until his death. He collaborated with Vakhtang Chabukiani on many productions in Tbilisi and Kirov, but he was best known internationally as Yury Grigorovich's designer, having collaborated on all of his major ballets. For Yury Grigorovich he designed The Stone Flower (1957), Legend of Love (1961), The Sleeping Beauty (1965 and 1973), The Nutcracker (1966), Spartacus (1968), Swan Lake (1969), Ivan the Terrible (1975), Angara (1976), Romeo and Juliet (1979), The Golden Age (1982), and Raymonda (1984). He also designed Sergeyev's Raymonda (Kirov, 1948), Swan Lake (Kirov, 1950), and The Sleeping Beauty (Kirov, 1952) and Vainonen's The Nutcracker (Kirov, 1954).

American reviewers, writing of touring Soviet productions, praised Virsaladze's designs for their grand scale, tastefulness, sensitivity to period and style and for often furthering the action of the ballet.

He received the USSR State Prize in 1977 and the Shota Rustaveli Prize in 1989.

He died in Tbilisi on 7 February 1989.

== See also ==
- Virsaladze, Georgian surname
