= Sukhishvili Georgian National Ballet =

Professional state dance company in Georgia

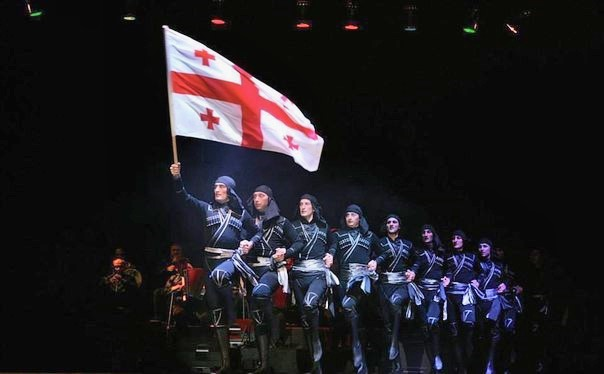
Khorumi dance performed by the Sukhishvili Georgian National Ballet

The Georgian National Ballet (Georgian: ქართული ეროვნული ბალეტი, romanized: kartuli erovnuli balet'i) is the first professional state dance company in Georgia. Founded by husband and wife Iliko Sukhishvili and Nino Ramishvili in 1945, it was initially named as the Georgian State Dance Company.

The Georgian National Ballet has performed at the Albert Hall, The Colosseum, The Metropolitan Opera and Madison Square Garden, among others. In 1967, the dance company performed at La Scala, reportedly the first and the only time a folklore group was given a chance to perform on its stage.

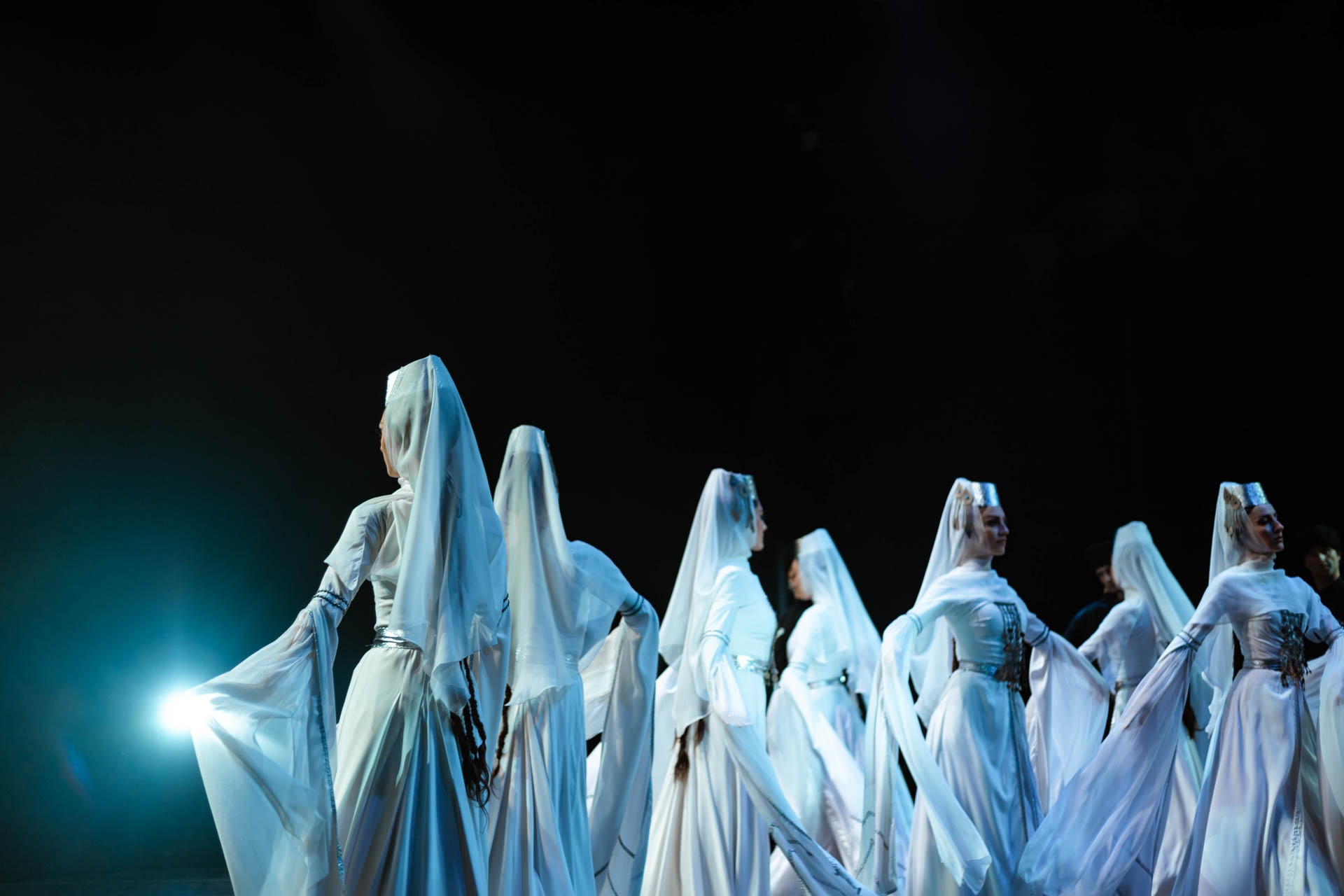
Sukhishvili in Poland, 2023

The costumes were designed by Simon (Soliko) Virsaladze from 1908–1989. Currently, the founders' son Tengiz Sukhishvili is the artistic director and general manager of the Georgian National Ballet. His spouse, Inga Tevzadze, is also a former dancer, now a ballet master. Iliko Sukhishvili Jr. is a chief choreographer of the Georgian National Ballet today. Nino Sukhishvili (the granddaughter of Iliko and Nino) is a deputy-manager and costume designer.

The Georgian National Ballet has seventy dancers and a small orchestra. The dance company also owns a school, which provides dance lessons to children and adolescents. In 2020, the School of the Georgian National Ballet began offering online lessons in response to the COVID-19 pandemic.

A performance by the Georgian National Ballet's dancers in which the female dancers, wearing long skirts, appeared to glide across the floor was an inspiration for writer Terry Nation in creating the Daleks for the television series Doctor Who.
