= List of Intangible Cultural Heritage elements in Georgia =

The United Nations Educational, Scientific and Cultural Organization (UNESCO) defines intangible cultural heritage elements as non-physical traditions and practices performed by a people. As part of a country's cultural heritage, they include celebrations, festivals, performances, oral traditions, music, and the making of handicrafts. The term "intangible cultural heritage" is formally established by the Convention for the Safeguarding of the Intangible Cultural Heritage, which was drafted in 2003 and took effect in 2006. Inscription of new heritage elements on the UNESCO Intangible Cultural Heritage Lists for their protection and safeguarding is determined by the Intergovernmental Committee for the Safeguarding of Intangible Cultural Heritage, an organization established by the convention. Georgia ratified the Convention on 18 March 2008.

Starting from 2011, 76 items were inscribed on the national registry of Georgia's Intangible Cultural Heritage (Georgian: არამატერიალური კულტურული მემკვიდრეობა, romanized: aramat'erialuri k'ult'uruli memk'vidreoba) as of October 2025. Five of them have been placed on the UNESCO Intangible Cultural Heritage Lists.

== Intangible Cultural Heritage of Humanity ==
UNESCO's Intangible Cultural Heritage of Humanity consists of three lists.

+ Transnational element

=== Representative List ===
This list aims to represent the intangible cultural heritage of Georgia worldwide and bring awareness to its significance.

Intangible Cultural Heritage elements recognized by UNESCO
Name	Media	Year	No.	Description
Georgian polyphonic singing		2008	00008	
Ancient Georgian traditional Qvevri wine-making method		2013	00870	
Living culture of three writing systems of the Georgian alphabet		2016	01205	
Chidaoba, wrestling in Georgia		2018	01371	
Georgian wheat culture: traditions and rituals		2025	02335	
