= Musical instruments of Georgia =

List of a country's musical instruments

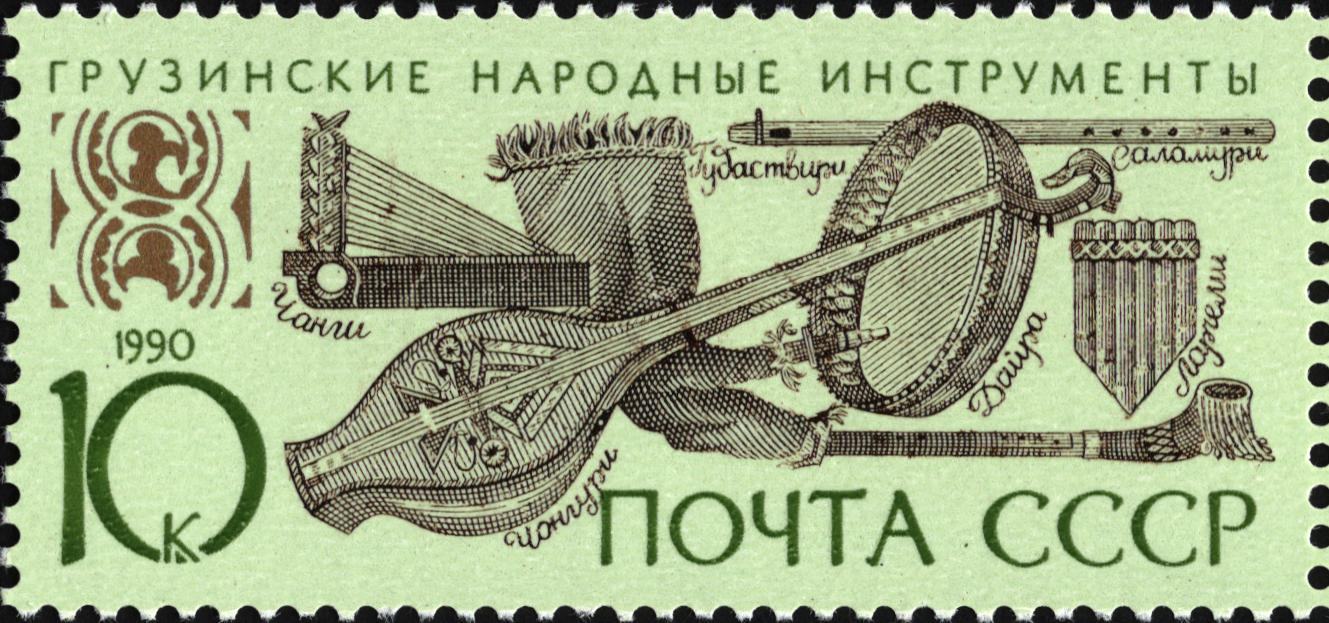
Soviet postage stamp depicting traditional musical instruments of Georgia.

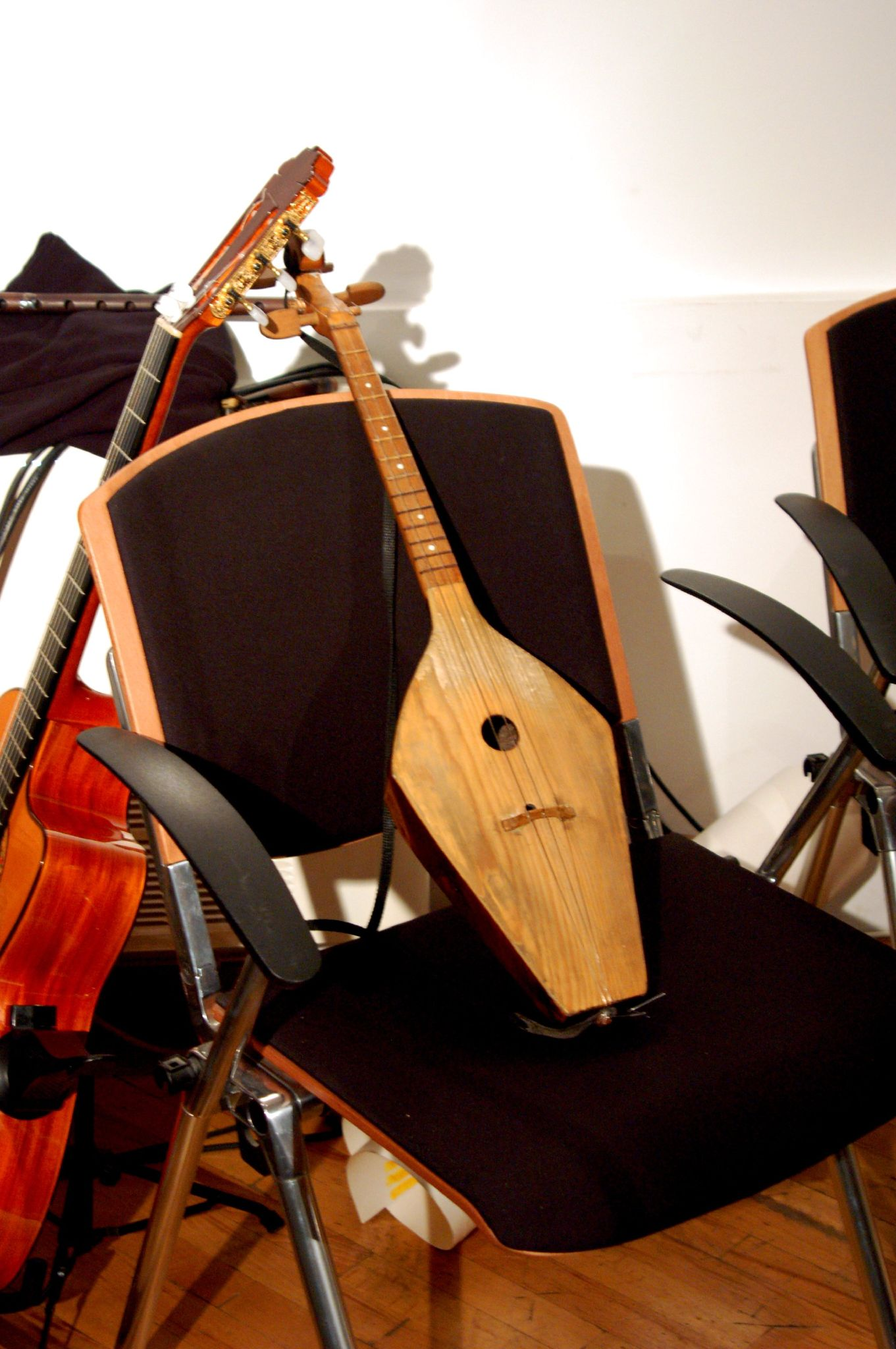
Panduri, a Georgian traditional instrument.

A rich variety of musical instruments are known from Georgia. Among the most popular instruments are blown instruments, like the soinari, known in Samegrelo as larchemi (Georgian panpipe), stviri (flute), gudastviri (bagpipe), string instruments like changi (harp), chonguri (four stringed unfretted long neck lute), panduri (three stringed fretted long neck lute), bowed chuniri, known also as chianuri, and a variety of drums. Georgian musical instruments are traditionally overshadowed by the rich vocal traditions of Georgia, and subsequently received much less attention from Georgian (and Western) scholars. Dimitri Arakishvili and particularly Manana Shilakadze contributed to the study of musical instrument in Georgia.

== List of instruments ==
Wind instruments

Larchemi (Georgian: ლარჩემი) / Soinari (Georgian: სოინარი) - ancient Georgian pan-pipe style instrument.

Salamuri (Georgian: სალამური) - a Georgian wind instrument resembling a recorder, widespread across regions.

Pilili (Georgian: პილილი) - small pipe instrument used in regions such as Adjara.

Gudastviri (Georgian: გუდასტვირი) / Stviri (Georgian: სტვირი) - Georgian droneless double-chantered bagpipe.

Duduki (Georgian: დუდუკი) - a double-reed wind instrument found in Georgia.

Zurna (Georgian: ზურნა) - loud conical-bore reed instrument used for festive/outdoor occasions.

Brass wind instruments

Sankeri (Georgian: სანკერი) - a bugle-like brass instrument in Georgian tradition.

String instruments

Panduri (Georgian: ფანდური) - a three-string plucked fretted lute from eastern Georgia.

Chonguri (Georgian: ჩონგური) - long fretless four-string lute from western Georgia.

Chuniri (Georgian: ჭუნირი) / Chianuri (Georgian: ჭიანური) - bowed string instrument from the mountains of Georgia.

Changi (Georgian: ჩანგი) - a harp-like string instrument from the Svaneti region.

Percussion instruments

Doli (Georgian: დოლი) - double-headed drum used widely in Georgian folk music.

Daira (Georgian: დაირა) - frame drum (similar to tambourine) used across Georgia.

Tsintsila (Georgian: ცინცილა) - small cymbals used in folk ensembles.

Diplipito (Georgian: დიპლიბიტო) - lesser-known percussion (membranophone) in Georgian tradition.

Georgian Accordion

Garmoni (Georgian: გარმონი) - diatonic button accordion introduced into Georgian folk tradition in the 19th–20th centuries.
