= Music of Georgia (country) =

The music of the country of Georgia is primarily known for arguably the earliest polyphonic tradition of the Christian world. Situated on the border of Europe and Asia, Georgia is also the home of a variety of urban singing styles with a mixture of native polyphony, Middle Eastern monophony and late European harmonic languages. Georgian performers are well represented in the world's leading opera troupes and concert stages.

== Folk music ==
Adila da Ali-phasha
A sample from Georgian Voices' Adila da Ali-phasha

The folk music of Georgia consists of at least fifteen regional styles, known in Georgian musicology and ethnomusicology as "musical dialects". According to Edisher Garaqanidze, there are sixteen regional styles in Georgia. These sixteen regions are traditionally grouped into two, eastern and western Georgian groups.

The Eastern Georgian group of musical dialects consists of the two biggest regions of Georgia, Kartli and Kakheti (Garakanidze united them as "Kartli-Kakheti"); several smaller north-east Georgian mountain regions, Khevsureti, Pshavi, Tusheti, Khevi, Mtiuleti, Gudamakari; and a southern Georgian region, Meskheti. Table songs from Kakheti in eastern Georgia usually feature a long drone bass with two soloists singing the top two parts. Perhaps the best-known example of music in Kakhetian style is the patriotic "Chakrulo", which was chosen to accompany the Voyager spacecraft in 1977. Known performers from the north-eastern region Khevsureti are the singers Dato Kenchiashvili and Teona Qumsiashvili (-2012).

The Western Georgian group of musical dialects consists of the central region of western Georgia, Imereti; three mountainous regions, Svaneti, Racha and Lechkhumi; and three Black Sea coastal regions, Samegrelo, Guria, and Achara. Georgian regional styles of music are sometimes also grouped into mountain and plain groups. Different scholars (Arakishvili, Chkhikvadze, Maisuradze) distinguish musical dialects differently, for example, some do not distinguish Gudamakari and Lechkhumi as separate dialects, and some consider Kartli and Kakheti to be separate dialects. Two more regions, Saingilo (in the territory of Azerbaijan) and Lazeti (in the territory of Turkey) are sometimes also included in the characteristics of Georgian traditional music.

=== Traditional vocal polyphony ===
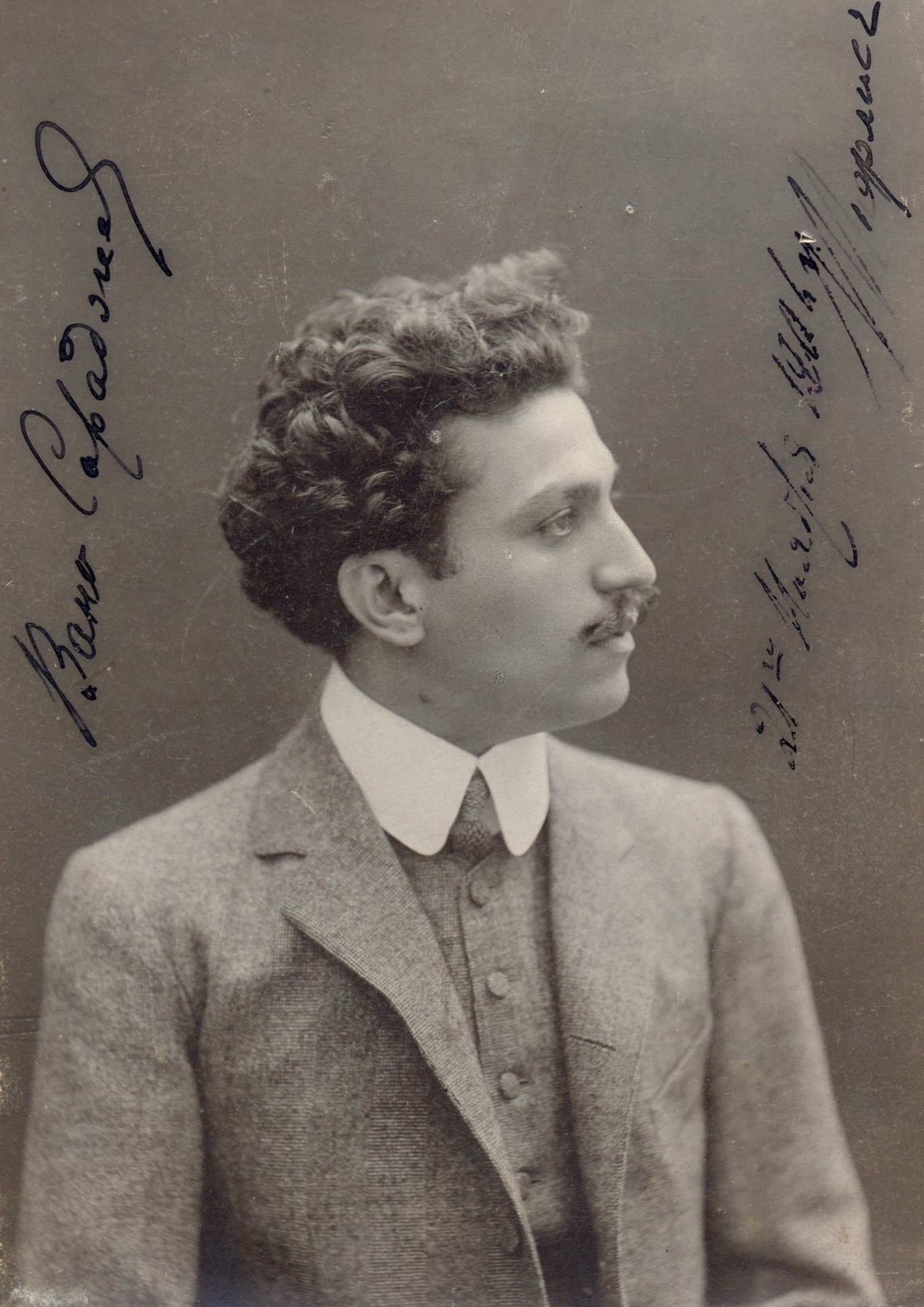
Vano Sarajishvili, known as the "Georgian Nightingale", began his musical career as part of a folk ensemble.

Georgian folk music is predominantly vocal and is widely known for its rich traditions of vocal polyphony. It is widely accepted in contemporary musicology that polyphony in Georgian music predates the introduction of Christianity in Georgia (beginning of the 4th century AD). All regional styles of Georgian music have traditions of vocal a cappella polyphony, although in the most southern regions (Meskheti and Lazeti) only historical sources provide the information about the presence of vocal polyphony before the 20th century.

Vocal polyphony based on ostinato formulas and rhythmic drone are widely distributed in all Georgian regional styles. Apart from these common techniques, there are also other, more complex forms of polyphony: pedal drone polyphony in Eastern Georgia, particularly in Kartli and Kakheti table songs (two highly embellished melodic lines develop rhythmically free on the background of pedal drone), and contrapuntal polyphony in Achara, Imereti, Samegrelo, and particularly in Guria (three and four part polyphony with highly individualized melodic lines in each part and the use of several polyphonic techniques). Western Georgian contrapuntal polyphony features the local variety of the yodel, known as krimanchuli.

Both east and west Georgian polyphony is based on wide use of sharp dissonant harmonies (seconds, fourths, sevenths, ninths). Because of the wide use of the specific chord consisting of the fourth and a second on top of the fourth (C-F-G), the founder of Georgian ethnomusicology, Dimitri Arakishvili called this chord the "Georgian Triad". Georgian music is also known for colorful modulations and unusual key changes.

Georgian polyphonic singing was among the first on the list of Masterpieces of the Oral and Intangible Heritage of Humanity in 2001. Georgian polyphonic singing was relisted on the Representative List of the Intangible Cultural Heritage of Humanity in 2008. It was inscribed on the Intangible Cultural Heritage of Georgia registry in 2011.

=== Scales and tuning system ===
There are different, sometimes conflicting views on the nature of Georgian scales. The most prevalent is the view expressed by Vladimer Gogotishvili, who suggested distinguishing diatonic scales based on a system of perfect fourths and those based on a system of perfect fifths. A system based on perfect fourths is mostly present in Eastern Georgia, but scales based on perfect fifths are spread wider, both in eastern and particularly western Georgia, as well as in Georgian Christian chants. In East Georgian table songs the scale system is based on a combination of the systems of fourth and fifth diatonic scales. In such songs the principle of the fourth diatonic scale is working above the pedal drone, and the system of the fifth diatonic is working under the pedal drone. Because of the peculiarity of the scale system based on perfect fifths, there is often an augmented octave in Georgian songs and church-songs. As in many traditional musical systems, tuning of Georgian scales is not based on the Western classical equally tempered 12-tone tuning system. The fifth is usually perfect, but the second, third and fourth are different from Classical intervals, producing a slightly compressed (compared to most European music) major second, a neutral third, and a slightly stretched fourth. Likewise, between the fifth and the octave come two evenly spaced notes, producing a slightly compressed major sixth and a stretched minor seventh.

Because of the strong influence of Western European music, present-day performers of Georgian folk music often employ Western tuning, bringing the seconds, fourths, sixths, and sevenths, and sometimes the thirds as well, closer to the standard equally tempered scale. This process started from the very first professional choir, organized in Georgia in 1886 (so called "Agniahsvili choro"). From the 1980s some ensembles (most notably the Georgian ensembles "Mtiebi" and "Anchiskhati", and the American ensemble Kavkasia) have tried to re-introduce the original non-tempered traditional tuning system. In some regions (most notably in Svaneti) some traditional singers still sing in the old, non-tempered tuning system.

=== Social setting ===
Singing is mostly a community activity in Georgia, and during big celebrations (for example, weddings) all the community is expected to participate in singing. Traditionally, top melodic parts are performed by individual singers, but the bass can have dozens or even hundreds of singers. There are also songs (usually more complex) that require a very small number of performers. Out of them the tradition of "trio" (three singers only) is very popular in western Georgia, particularly in Guria.

Georgian folk songs are often centered around banquet-like feasts called supra, where songs and toasts to God, peace, motherland, long life, love, friendship and other topics are proposed. Traditional feast songs include "Zamtari" ("Winter"), which is about the transient nature of life and is sung to commemorate ancestors, and a great number of "Mravalzhamier" songs. As many traditional activities greatly changed their nature (for example, working processes), the traditional feast became the harbor for many different genres of music. Work songs are widespread in all regions. The orovela, for example is a specific solo work song found in eastern Georgia only. The extremely complex three and four part working song naduri is characteristic of western Georgia. There are a great number of healing songs, funerary ritual songs, wedding songs, love songs, dance songs, lullabies, traveling songs. Many archaic songs are connected to round dances.

Contemporary Georgian stage choirs are generally male, though some female groups also exist; mixed-gender choirs are rare, but also exist. (An example of the latter is the Zedashe ensemble, based in Sighnaghi, Kakheti.) At the same time, in village ensembles mixed participation is more common, and according to Zakaria Paliashvili, in the most isolated region of Georgia, Upper Svaneti, mixed performance of folk songs were a common practice.

=== Performance practices ===
Georgian vocal polyphony was maintained for millennia by village singers, mostly local farmers. From the end of the 19th century to the beginning of the 20th century a great number of gramophone recordings of Georgian village singers were made. Anzor Erkomaishvili was paramount in recovering these recordings and re-issuing them on a series of CDs. Despite the poor technical quality of the old recordings, they often serve as the model of high mastery of the performance of Georgian traditional songs for contemporary ensembles.

During the Soviet period (1921–1991), folk music was highly praised, and revered folk musicians were awarded with governmental prizes and were given salaries. At the same time some genres were forbidden (particularly Christian church-songs), and the tendency to create huge regional choirs with big groups singing each melodic part damaged the improvisatory nature of Georgian folk music. Also, singing and dancing, usually closely interconnected in rural life, were separated on a concert stage. From the 1950s and the 1960s new type of ensembles (Shvidkatsa, Gordela) brought back the tradition of smaller ensembles and improvisation.

Since the 1970s, Georgian folk music has been introduced to a wider audience in different countries around the world. The ensembles Rustavi and later Georgian Voices were particularly active in presenting rich polyphony of various regions of Georgia to western audiences. Georgian Voices performed alongside Billy Joel, and the Rustavi Choir was featured on the soundtrack to Coen Brothers' 1998 film, The Big Lebowski. During the end of the 1960s and 1970s an innovative pop-ensemble Orera featured a mixture of traditional polyphony with jazz and other popular musical genres, becoming arguably the most popular ensemble of the Soviet Union in the 1970s. This line of fusion of Georgian folk polyphony with other genres became popular in the 1990s, and the Stuttgart-based ensemble The Shin became a popular representative of this generation of Georgian musicians.

By the mid-1980s, the first ensembles of Georgian music consisting of non-Georgian performers had started to appear outside of Georgia (first in USA and Canada, later in other European countries). This process became particularly active after the dissolution of the Soviet Union, when the Iron Curtain disappeared and travel to the Western countries became possible for Georgians. Today it is a common practice for Georgian ensembles and traditional singers to visit Western countries for performances and workshops.

=== Study of Georgian folk music ===
The 1861 article by Jambakur-Orbeliani and the 1864 article by Machabeli are considered as the first published works where some aspect of Georgian folk music were discussed. Earlier works (like the 18th century "Dictionary of Georgian Language" by Sulkhan-Saba Orbeliani, and "Kalmasoba" by Prince Ioane of Georgia) discussed Georgian church singing traditions only.

Dimitri Arakishvili and Zakaria Paliashvili are considered the most influential figures of study of Georgian folk music. Arakishvili published several standard books and articles on Georgian singing traditions, musical instruments, scales, and is widely considered as "founding father" of Georgian ethnomusicology.

Grigol Chkhikvadze and Shalva Aslanishvili, born during the last years of the 19th century, received professional education in Russia and became important figures of the study of Georgian traditional music. The historian Ivane Javakhishvili published an influential work on the history of Georgian music, which is still considered as the most comprehensive work on historical sources on Georgian music. Otar Chijavadze, Valerian Magradze, Kakhi Rosebashvili, Mindia Jordania, Kukuri Chokhonelidze were the first Georgian scholars that were educated in Georgia and contributed to the study of different aspect of Georgian folk music. From the end of the 20th century a new generation of Georgian ethnomusicologists appeared, among them Edisher Garakanidze, Joseph Jordania, Nato Zumbadze, Nino Tsitsishvili, Tamaz Gabisonia, Nino Makharadze, David Shugliashvili, Maka Khardziani.

Apart from Georgian scholars, non-Georgian musicians and scholars also contributed to the study of Georgian traditional music. Among them were German and Austrian scholars Adolf Dirr, Robert Lach, Georg Schunemann, and Siegfried Nadel, who were able to record and study traditional songs from Georgian war prisoners during the first World War. Siegfried Nadel published a monograph about Georgian music, where he proposed that Georgian polyphony possibly contributed to the emergence of European professional polyphony (this idea was developed by Marius Schneider for several decades). Russian musicians Mikhail Ippolitov-Ivanov and Nikolai Klenovsky also contributed to the early study of Georgian folk music. Russian scholar Steshenko-Kuftina contributed a highly revered monograph on Georgian panpipe. After the fall of the Soviet Union a number of Western Scholars started working on Georgian folk music, mostly on different aspects the traditional polyphony. Among them are Carl Linich, Stuart Gelzer, Susanne Ziegler, Simha Arom, Polo Vallejo, John A. Graham, Lauren Ninoshvili, Caroline Bithell, and Andrea Kuzmich.

In the 21st century Georgia has become one of the international centers of the study of the phenomenon of traditional polyphony. In 2003 the International Research Centre for Traditional Polyphony was established (director Rusudan Tsurtsumia). The tradition of biannual conferences and symposia started in Georgia in the 1980s. These symposia are drawing leading experts of traditional polyphony to Georgia.

== Urban music ==
In the context of Georgian musical tradition, Urban Music mainly refers to specific regional musical styles with Georgian influences, especially in the capital, Tbilisi. Perhaps the most prominent style of Urban Georgian Music is the duduk or duduki. The “duduki (in Georgian), also known as balaban, yasti balaman, and duduk (in Azerbaijan) and mey or ney (in Turkish), is a double-reed aerophone with a cylindrical bore, widely used in the Middle East and Transcaucasia, mostly in ensembles.” While duduki refers to an individual instrument or ensemble, this one musical tradition itself encapsulates a variety of other Georgian musical traditions and styles, such as the dasta (ensembles which are often hired for celebratory events). The duduki dasta has a number of influences, including “Azeri-Persian, Turkish, and Armenian derivation.”

The duduki, as well as other Georgian musical traditions, has a number of influences. For example, from the second part of the 19th century, European classical music, based on parallel thirds and triadic harmonies, became popular in Georgia. Opening of the opera in 1850 had a profound influence on Georgian urban societies and soon new styles of music became very popular. Two of the European styles of Georgian Urban Music include: (1) a cappella choral singing in three vocal parts, and (2) solo (or three-part) singing with the accompaniment of musical instruments (usually a guitar, or a piano).

Georgia, as a nation, having been “at the crossroads of Europe and Asia in contact with Greek, Roman, Byzantine, and Persian civilization,” as well as having, early on, adopted Christianity and developed long-standing cultural “links with the Islamic world,” has a vast array of cultural origins. Thus, Georgia’s Urban musical traditions are not simply influenced by immediately surrounding regions, or just the cultural import of European classical music, but, rather, a vast assortment of different cultures and traditions from a wide variety of temporal-historical contexts.

== Professional music ==
Thou Art a Vineyard
Shen Khar Venakhi sung by a Georgian choir

Professional music in Georgia existed at least from the 7-8th centuries, when Georgian composers started translating Greek orthodox Christian chants, adding harmonies to the monophonic melodies, and also were creating original chants. It is widely accepted, that polyphony in Georgian church-singing came from the folk tradition. Georgian church-music has many parallels with Georgian traditional music, although some elements of folk musical style were never used in church-singing (for example, the very long drones of eastern Georgian table songs, or the yodel of Western Georgian counterpoint. In some regions Christian chants have clear elements of pre-Christian traditions as well. Scholars usually distinguish two styles of Georgian church-singing: eastern Georgian and western Georgian. Both styles are based on similar principles, particularly the "simple mood" of singing, but in some western Georgian church-singing styles (particularly in so-called "Shemokmedi school") the polyphonic mastery and the use of sharp dissonances reaches its climax. The study of church-singing was strictly forbidden in the Soviet Union, but after the fall of the Soviet Union this became one of the most actively researched spheres of Georgian musicology.

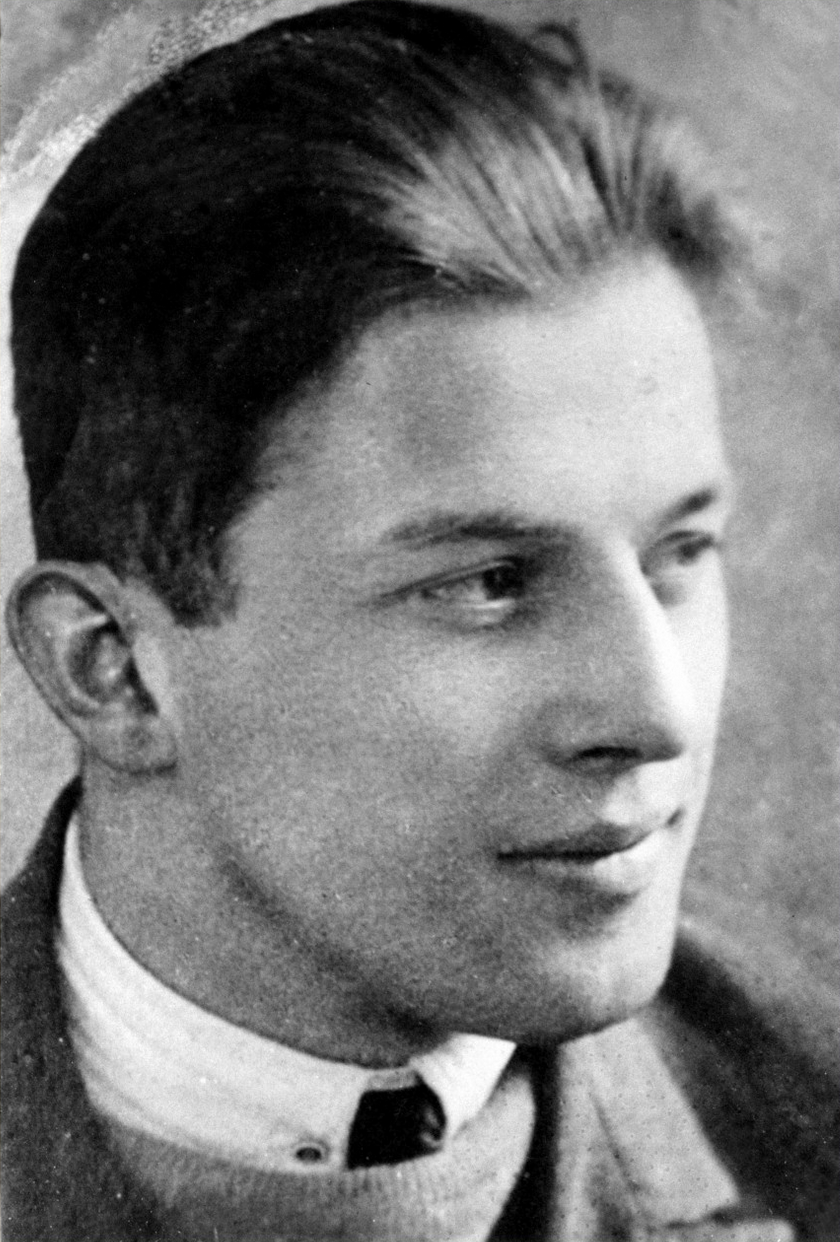
Evgeni Mikeladze, leading Georgian conductor executed by the Soviets

The so-called "new Georgian professional musical school" started in the second half of the 19th century. It was based on European classical musical language and classical musical forms (opera, symphony, etc.). The greatest representatives of this school of Georgian composers (Zakaria Paliashvili, Dimitri Arakishvili, Niko Sulkhanishvili) merged European musical language with the elements of Georgian traditional harmony and polyphony. Among the composers of the later period were Andria Balanchivadze (brother of George Balanchine), Aleksandre Machavariani, Shalva Mshvelidze, Otar Taktakishvili. 20th century urban pop music also received significant contributions from the likes of Giorgi Tsabadze. The most prominent contemporary Georgian composer was the late Antwerp-based Giya Kancheli.

Georgia-born violinist Lisa Batiashvili enjoys an international reputation.

=== Traditional musical instruments ===
A wide variety of musical instruments are known from Georgia. Among the most popular instruments are: wind instruments such as the soinari, known in Samegrelo as larchemi (Georgian panpipe), stviri (flute), gudastviri (bagpipe), the Georgian accordion, string instruments like the changi (harp), chonguri (four stringed unfretted long neck lute), panduri (three stringed fretted long neck lute), bowed chuniri, known also as chianuri, plus a variety of drums and percussive instruments. Georgian musical instruments are traditionally overshadowed by the rich vocal traditions of Georgia, and subsequently received much less attention from Georgian (and Western) scholars. Dimitri Arakishvili and particularly Manana Shilakadze contributed to the study of musical instrument in Georgia

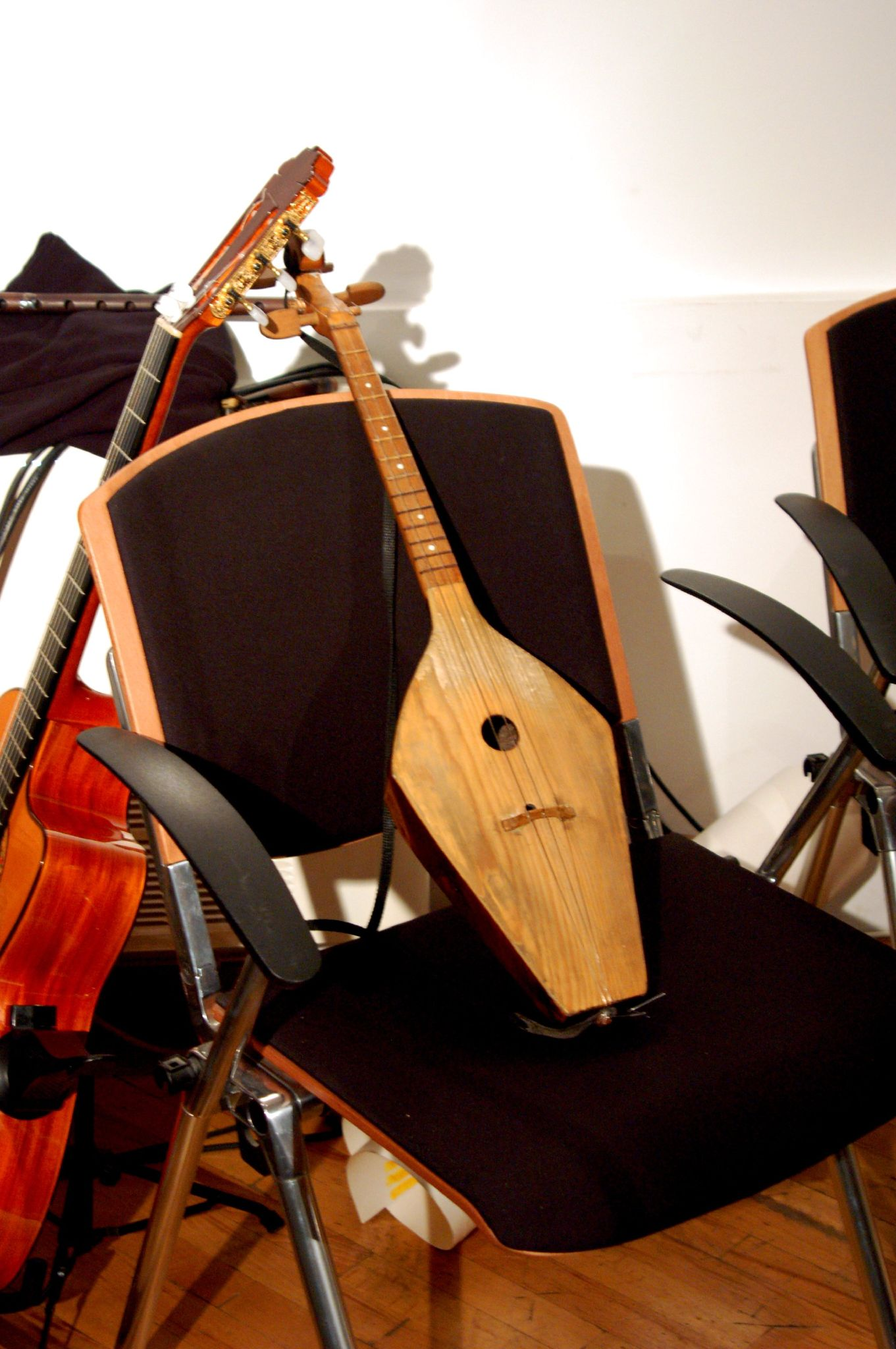
Panduri, a Georgian traditional instrument.

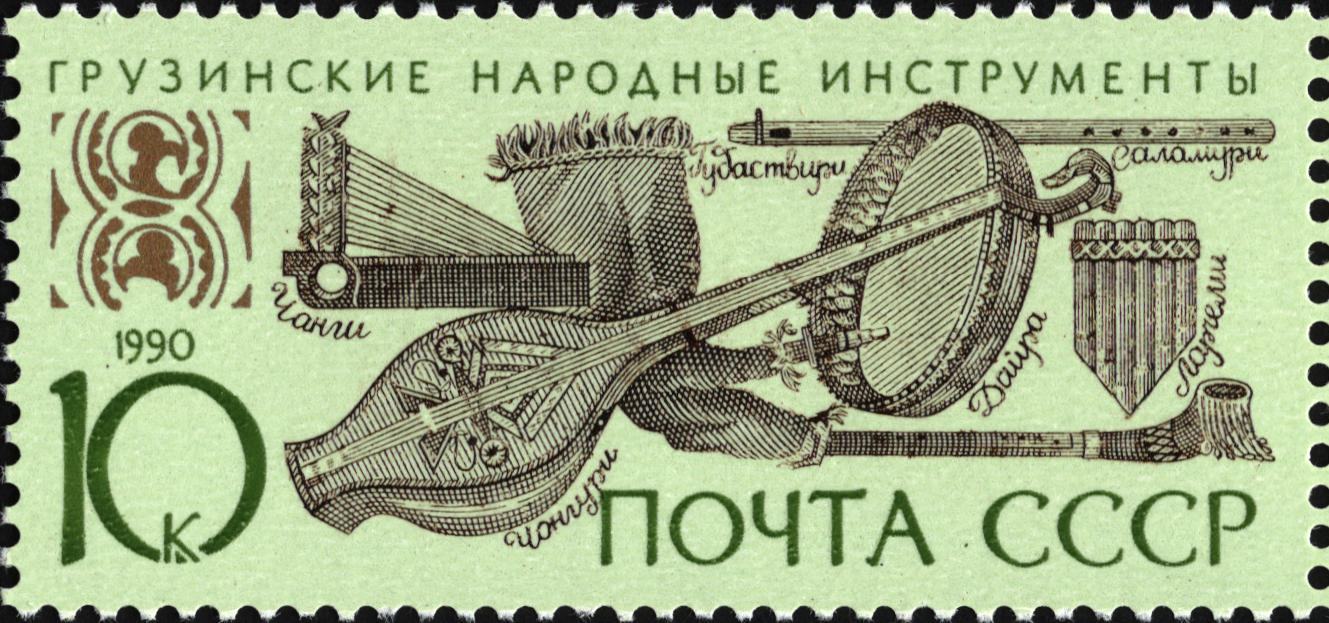
Soviet postage stamp depicting traditional musical instruments of Georgia.

==== Chuniri-chianuri ====
Only the mountain inhabitants of Georgia preserve the bowed Chuniri in its original form. This instrument is considered to be a national instrument of Svaneti and is thought to have spread in the other regions of Georgia from there. Chuniri has different names in different regions: in Khevsureti, Tusheti (Eastern mountainous parts) its name is Chuniri, and in Racha, Guria (western parts of Georgia) "Chianuri". Chuniri is used for accompaniment. It is often played in an ensemble with Changi (harp) and Salamuri (flute). Both men and women played it. Accompaniment of solo songs, national heroic poems and dance melodies were performed on it in Svaneti. Chuniri and Changi are often played together in an ensemble when performing polyphonic songs. More than one Chianuri at a time is not used. The Chianuri is traditionally kept in a warm place.

Often, especially in rainy days it was warmed in the sun or near fireplace before using, in order to emit more harmonious sounds. This fact is acknowledged in all regions where the fiddlestick instruments were spread. That is done generally because dampness and wind make a certain effect on the instrument's resonant body and the leather that covers it. In Svaneti and Racha people even could make a weather forecast according to the sound produced by Chianuri. Weak and unclear sounds were the signs of a rainy weather.

The instrument's side strings i.e. first and third strings are tuned in fourth, but the middle (second) string is tuned in third with the lowest string and second with the top string. It was a tradition to play Chuniri late in the evening the day before a funeral. For instance, one of the relatives (man) of a dead person would sit down in open air by the bonfire and play a sad melody. In his song (sang in a low voice) he would remember the life of the deceased person and the lives of ancestors of the family. Most of the songs performed on Chianuri are connected with sad occasions. There is an expression in Svaneti that "Chuniri is for sorrow". However, it can be used at parties as well.

The Abkharza is a two-string musical instrument which is played by a bow. It is thought to have spread through Georgia from the region of Abkhazia. Mostly the Abkharza is used as an accompaniment instrument. There are performed one, two or three part songs and national heroic poems on it. Abkharza is cut out of a whole wood piece and has a shape of a boat. Its overall length is 480mm. its upper board is glued back to the main part. On the end it has two tuners.

== See also ==
- Iavnana
- Polyphony
- Choral singing
- Caucasus
- Georgia in the Eurovision Song Contest
- Suliko
- International Research Centre for Traditional Polyphony
- Tbilisi State Conservatory
- Rustavi Ensemble
- Tsintskaro
- Chakrulo
