= Naduri =

Naduri (Georgian: ნადური) is a category of Georgian polyphonic work song from the western Georgian provinces of Guria and Adjara (Achara), traditionally sung by men while hoeing or weeding the fields. The genre takes its name from the nadi, a communal work party at which the songs were performed; a household that organised a hoeing without a nadi was considered inhospitable, and villages without resident naduri singers would invite them in from neighbouring settlements.

Most field naduris of the Guria-Adjara region are sung in four parts and are performed antiphonally between two competing half-choirs, an organisation that ethnomusicologists have called "an unusual phenomenon in world musical folklore" because of the placement of the principal drone in the middle, rather than at the bottom, of the texture. Together with the rest of the Georgian polyphonic repertoire, naduri singing is part of Georgian polyphonic singing as inscribed in 2001 (re-proclaimed 2008) on UNESCO's Representative List of the Intangible Cultural Heritage of Humanity.

== Name and classification ==
The Georgian word naduri is an adjective derived from nadi, the traditional Gurian institution of co-operative agricultural labour in which neighbours gathered to hoe, weed or harvest a single household's field in exchange for hospitality. The nadi both organised the work and turned it, in the words of Cal Performances' programme note on the State Folk Ensemble of Georgia, "into a festival, where old fertility rites could continue to be celebrated".

Naduri is classified by Georgian ethnomusicologists as a sub-genre of samushao simgera (work song) and is the principal four-part contrapuntal genre of western Georgia, alongside the Kakhetian namgluri (sickle song) of the east.

== Musical structure ==
=== Voice parts ===
A fully developed Gurian or Adjarian field naduri requires at least six singers on each side of the antiphon, distributed across four parts:

- Bani (bass) - a melodically active lowest voice sung by a group of singers, a fifth below the central drone.
- Shemkhmobari - a pedal drone in the middle of the texture, sung by a group of singers. It is the only bass during the three-part opening of the song and is joined from below by bani once the song moves into its four-part section.
- Tkma (also mtkmeli or, specifically in naduri, momchivani) - the lead melodic voice, sung by a single singer. It moves typically a major second below the shemkhmobari and is the only voice that carries the meaningful text; all other parts sing on voice-specific nonsense syllables.
- Krimanchuli or gamqivani - the highest voice, a yodel sung in forced falsetto by a single singer, built on wide melodic leaps (most often through the interval of a fifth) and on a fixed correspondence between vowel and pitch.

The placement of the shemkhmobari pedal in the middle of the texture is the distinctive structural feature of the genre and the principal reason that Georgian musicologists treat naduri as a separate type within Gurian-Adjarian polyphony.

=== Form ===
The song opens in three parts, without bani. After a section of indeterminate length the lowest voice enters a fifth below the central drone, transforming the song into four-part polyphony; Georgian terminology designates the four-part section by the name gadaktseuli naduri (lit. "transformed naduri"). The bass typically drops out again near the end, so that the song finishes in the same three-part texture in which it began.

=== Antiphonal performance ===
Field naduris are performed as alternating exchanges between two equal half-choirs, an organisation given several local names: gadabmuli in Adjara when the second choir enters before the first has finished, gakidebuli simgera ("chase-singing"), and the pan-Georgian orpiruli ("two-sided"). The exchange takes the form of a friendly competition known in Adjara as gadakideba, in which each part of one choir is matched against the corresponding part of the other; the contest often continued into the toast-telling of the evening meal that followed the day's work.

== Performance context ==
Naduri is sung outdoors during fieldwork - classically during the hoeing of maize but also during weeding and grape harvesting. According to descriptions collected from the Guria-Adjara tradition, a full naduri could last over an hour and involve as many as two hundred singers. The tempo is variable: the song begins slowly and accelerates as the work proceeds, with the rhythm of the hoe stroke following the rhythm of the music rather than the reverse. Field naduris are described in the ethnomusicological literature as "the longest and most sophisticated antiphonal work songs" of the Georgian repertoire and number in the dozens of distinct named pieces (for example Chochkhatura, a Gurian naduri included in the recording and concert repertoire of the State Folk Ensemble of Georgia).

== Texts ==
In keeping with the use of nonsense syllables for the three accompanying parts, the meaningful text of a field naduri is carried by the momchivani alone, and its lyrics often have no connection to the agricultural work being performed; surviving texts include lyric, narrative and humorous subjects.

== Recognition ==
Naduri is mentioned by name in UNESCO's description of Georgian polyphonic singing, where it is offered as the principal example of a Georgian work-song genre that "incorporates the sounds of physical effort into the music". The genre has been brought to international concert audiences by ensembles such as the Rustavi Ensemble and Basiani (the State Folk Ensemble of Georgia), the latter performing naduri settings at venues including the Concertgebouw in Amsterdam, Lincoln Center, and the Aldeburgh Festival in England.

== See also ==
- Georgian polyphonic singing (covered in Music of Georgia (country))
- Krimanchuli (covered in Music of Georgia (country))
- Chakrulo
- Mravalzhamieri
- Work song
- Antiphon
