= Erkomaishvili =

Erkomaishvili is a surname. Notable people with the surname include:

- Anzor Erkomaishvili (1940–2021), Georgian singer, composer, and folk music researcher
- Artem Erkomaishvili (1887–1967), Georgian traditional chanter
