= Mtiebi =

Mtiebi is a Georgian singing ensemble performing traditional vocal polyphony.

Ensemble Mtiebi was formed in 1980 by Edisher Garakanidze (1957–1998), noted Georgian ethnomusicologist, scholar and performer. The ensemble was formed as a reaction to the increasing modernisation of the performance practices of Georgian traditional music, in order to reconstruct the traditional performance practice of Georgian villagers. The principles of the ensemble became: (1) to bring back the natural unity of singing and dancing (which was and still is disconnected in most of the contemporary Georgian folk ensembles), (2) to recover the tradition of the live improvisation on stage, including improvising poetry in traditional poetic competitions, (3) to present the traditional choreographic movements instead of the professionally developed staged dances.

Garakanidze did not organize the ensemble from seasoned singers of Georgian traditional songs. Instead he taught Georgian songs to his friends. Mtiebi members were often visiting villages, participating in village traditional celebrations. Despite their closeness to the village performance practices, Mtiebi did not try to emulate villagers and for a long time they were performing without traditional clothes.

Mtiebi toured extensively in European countries and in the United States, organizing performances and workshops. After the death of Edisher Garakanidze in 1998, his son Gigi became a leader of Mtiebi. Children's ensemble "Amer-Imeri" was established by Garakanidze (together with Nato Zumbadze), and today former Amer-Imeri singers comprise a new generation of Mtiebi. Although initially Mtiebi was an all-male ensemble, in Ameri-Imeri both boys and girls were taught Georgian songs and dance, and new generation of Mtiebi is a mixed ensemble.

Mtiebi had a profound influence on the development of the performance practices of Georgian traditional music. Female ensemble "Mzetamze" was established as a female counterpart of Mtiebi, based on similar principles. Ensemble "Anchiskhati" is another ensemble that was affected by the principles of Mtiebi. Performance principles of Mtiebi affected foreign ensembles of Georgian music as well, among them trio "Kavkasia" (USA-Canada), choirs "Darbazi" (Canada) "Marani" (France) as well as"Maspindzeli" and "Chela" choirs and "Buska" ensemble (UK). Mtiebi is widely regarded in Georgia as the first ensemble of the new generation that established the principles of village performance of Georgian traditional music and dance on a stage. Documentary film "Mtiebi" was produced in 1988 (director, Dimitri Gugunava).

== Discography ==
List of CDs and DVDs issued by Mtiebi during 1996-2010

== See also ==
Music of Georgia
