= Chuniri =

Bowed musical instrument of Georgia

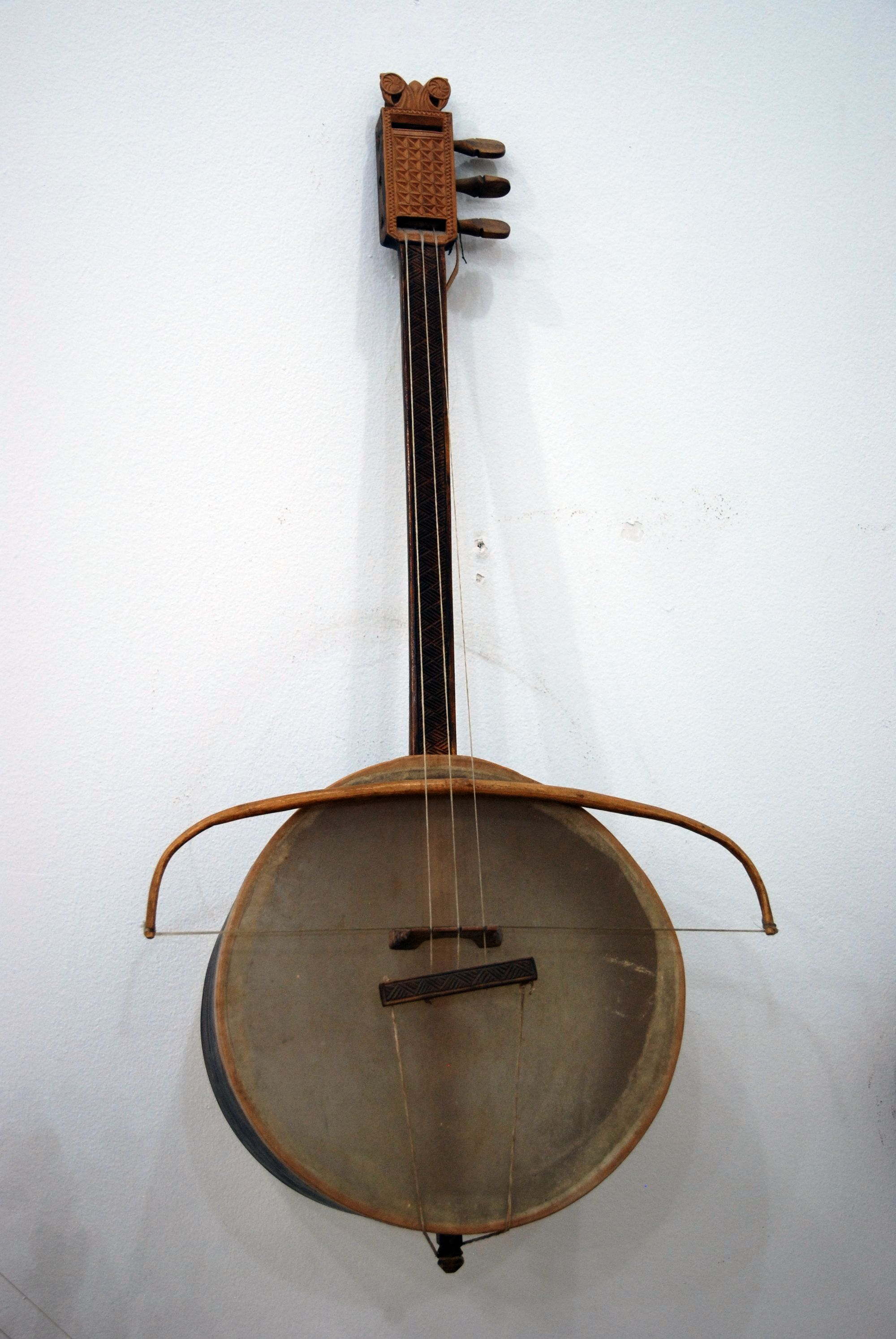
- Other names: Chianuri
- Classification: Bowed string instrument

The chuniri (Georgian: ჭუნირი, romanized: ch'uniri) is a bowed musical instrument of Georgia.

== History ==
Only the mountain inhabitants of Georgia preserve the bowed chuniri in its original form. This instrument is considered to be a national instrument of Svaneti and is thought to have spread in the other regions of Georgia from there. Chuniri has different names in different regions: in Khevsureti, Tusheti (Eastern mountainous parts) its name is chuniri, and in Racha, Guria (western parts of Georgia) chianuri. Chuniri is used for accompaniment. It is often played in an ensemble with changi (harp) and salamuri (flute). Both men and women played it.

Accompaniment of solo songs, national heroic poems and dance melodies were performed on it in Svaneti. Chuniri and changi are often played together in an ensemble when performing polyphonic songs. More than one Chianuri at a time is not used.

Chianuri is kept in a warm place. Often, especially in rainy days it was warmed in the sun or near fireplace before using, in order to emit more harmonious sounds. This fact is acknowledged in all regions where the fiddlestick instruments were spread. That is done generally because dampness and wind have a certain effect on the instrument's resonant body and the leather that covers it. In Svaneti and Racha people even could make a weather forecast according to the sound produced by chianuri. Weak and unclear sounds were the signs of a rainy weather.

The instrument's side strings i.e. first and third strings are tuned in fourth, but the middle (second) string is tuned in third with the lowest string and second with the top string. It was a tradition to play Chuniri late in the evening the day before a funeral. For instance, one of the relatives (man) of a dead person would sit down in open air by the bonfire and play a sad melody. In his song (sang in a low voice) he would remember the life of the deceased person and the lives of ancestors of the family. Most of the songs performed on Chianuri are connected with sad occasions. There is an expression in Svaneti that "chuniri is for sorrow". However, it can be used at parties as well.

== See also ==
- Chuurqin
- igil
- Morin khuur
- Apkhyarta
