= Anzor Erkomaishvili =

Georgian singer (1940–2021)

- ანზორ ერქომაიშვილი
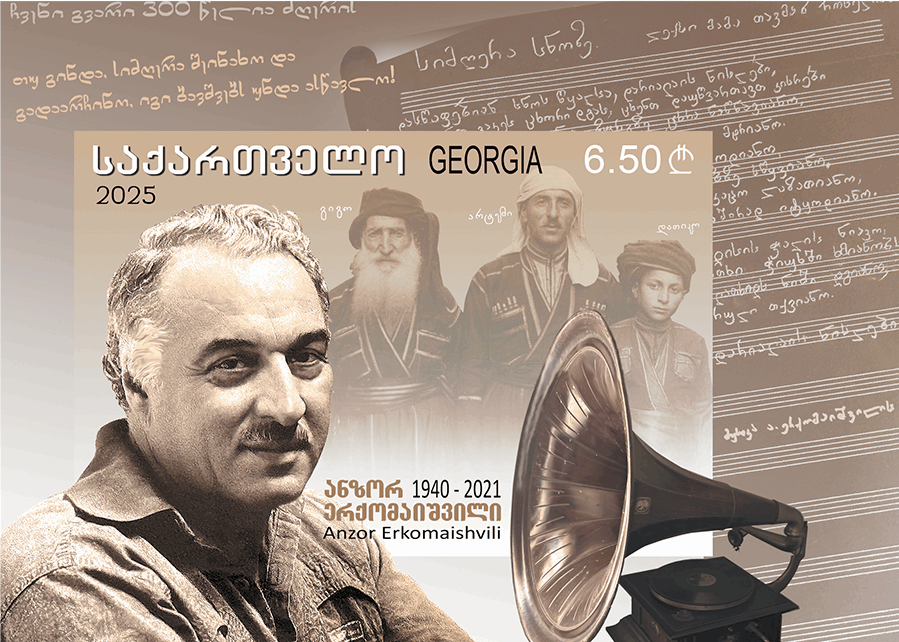
- Erkomaishvili on a 2025 stamp of Georgia
- Born: August 10, 1940; Batumi, Georgian Soviet Socialist Republic
- Died: March 21, 2021 (aged 80); Tbilisi, Georgia
- Education: Tbilisi State Conservatoire
- Occupations: Singer, composer, music researcher
- Relatives: Artem Erkomaishvili (grandfather)

Anzor Erkomaishvili (Georgian: ანზორ ერქომაიშვილი; 10 August 1940 – 31 March 2021) was a Georgian singer, composer, and music researcher. From 1968 until his death, he was director of the Rustavi Ensemble.

== Biography ==
Erkomaishvili was born on 10 August 1940, in Batumi, (then part of the Georgian Soviet Socialist Republic), to a family with a longstanding musical tradition. His grandfather was the Georgian folk singer Artem Erkomaishvili. He graduated from the Tbilisi State Conservatoire in 1969. Still being a student, he began collecting and transcribing the polyphonic Georgian folk repertoire, particularly from the province of Guria. In 1968, he founded the Rustavi Choir which toured throughout Georgia and abroad for decades.

Erkomaishvili's work on researching, compiling and safeguarding the folk singing legacy earned him many awards, including the title of Meritorious Artist of Georgia (1969), Ivane Javakhishvili and Shota Rustaveli national prizes, Order of Honor and Presidential Order of Excellence (2020), Honorary Citizenship of Tbilisi (2014) and others. In 2008, he was elected to the Parliament of Georgia for the ruling United National Movement party from the single-mandate district of Ozurgeti, but he resigned his parliamentary position in March 2009. He published memoirs and books on Georgian folk music.

Erkomaishvili died on 31 March 2021, aged 80, at a hospital in Tbilisi, from COVID-19. He was buried at the Mtatsminda Pantheon in Tbilisi.
