= Makharadze =

Makharadze (Georgian: მახარაძე) is a Georgian surname which may refer to:

- Makharadze brothers, one of the Georgian horsemen in Wild West shows
- Filipp Makharadze, Georgian bolshevik
- Kakhi Makharadze, Georgian footballer
- Avtandil Makharadze, Georgian actor
- Kote Makharadze, Georgian actor and sports commentator
- Mikheil Makharadze, Georgian politician and historian
- Gueorgui Makharadze, Georgian diplomat
- Zauri Makharadze, Ukrainian footballer of Georgian origin
- Ozurgeti, a former name of that city
