= International Research Center for Traditional Polyphony =

The International Research Center for Traditional Polyphony (IRCTP or Polyphonic Center) is an academic organization focused on the study of the phenomenon of traditional vocal polyphony. It is a part of Tbilisi Vano Sarajishvili State Conservatory. Establishment of IRCTP was announced during the First International Symposium of Traditional Polyphony in 2002, and it was logistically established by the order of the Rector of Tbilisi State Conservatory in February 2003. Its director is Rusudan Tsurtsumia. The head of its International Bureau is Joseph Jordania. Central activity of the Polyphonic Center is organizing biannual symposia, with subsequent publication of the presented papers, fostering dissemination of the knowledge on human musical cultures and establishing close professional contacts between ethnomusicologists interested in study of the phenomenon of traditional choral singing.

== History ==
Georgia has been known among ethnomusicologists as the country with extremely rich traditions of vocal polyphony since the 1920s. Study of vocal polyphony has been one of the central issues for Georgian ethnomusicology from the second half of the 19th century. In 1972 Union of Composers of Soviet Union organized the conference dedicated to traditional polyphony in Georgia (this was the very first conference in the world, fully dedicated to traditional polyphony). The ongoing series of biannual conferences dedicated to the problems of traditional polyphony, with the wide participation of the experts from Soviet Union, Europe and America, were organized in 1984, 1986 and 1988. The following conference (scheduled in 1990) was initially postponed and later canceled due to the political instability in post-soviet Georgia. The series of biannual conferences on traditional polyphony were revived in 1998 and 2000, leading to the organizing of the First International Symposium on Traditional Polyphony in 2002. The first symposium was preceded by proclamation of Georgian traditional polyphony among the Masterpieces of the Oral and Intangible Heritage of Humanity by UNESCO in 2001. Representative of UNESCO attended the symposium, providing support of UNESCO. The Polyphonic Centre has been supported during the recent years by the Presidents of Georgia, Eduard Shevardnadze and Mikhail Saakashvili. For several years the Polyphonic Centre was also supported by the Japanese government. There has been a steady increase in interest towards the study of traditional polyphony (choral singing) during the recent years. In the 1970s there were two initial conferences organized on this subject, in the 1980s four conference, in the 1990s three conferences, and during the first decade of the 21st century nine conferences had been organized in several countries (apart from Georgia, in Taiwan in 2002, in Austria in 2005 and 2008, in Portugal in 2007). A centre for the study of European traditional polyphony was established at Vienna University in 2005, and the study group on multipart music of ICTM was established in 2009 and organized a conference in Sardinia, Italy in 2010. The earliest international organization to dedicate its activity entirely to study of traditional choral singing was Polifonies Vivante, organized in France during the 1991-1994 by Simha Arom.

== International symposia ==
International symposia on the problems of traditional polyphony had been organized biannually from 2002. The last one was held on September 26 - October 1, 2016. All of them had been organized in late September - early October, at the Tbilisi State Conservatory. The geography of representation of scholars from different countries of the world had been steadily increasing. A group of international expert-ethnomusicologists, including Simha Arom from France, Dieter Christensen from the United States, Franz Fodermayr from Austria, Polo Vallejo from Spain, had been participating in virtually every symposia, together with ethnomusicologists from different countries (including experts from China, Japan, Australia, Canada, eastern and western Europe, Turkey, Egypt. The general program of the symposia is stable and contains twelve themes, covering wide range of research topics, including problems of vocal and instrumental polyphony, folk and church music, regional styles, elements of musical language, social and gender aspects, history, links with popular musical styles. Participating scholars are traditionally provided by the hosts with hotel accommodation, internal transport and food during the Symposium. In 2010 for the first time a special theme was added (vocal polyphony is Asia). 2012 symposium (September 24–29) had the special theme comparative research in traditional polyphony, 2014 Symposium main theme was Polyphony in Minority Music (September 22–26, 2014), and 2016 symposium was dedicated to the geographic dynamics of traditional polyphony (September 26 - October 1, 2016). Next symposium is planning to a later date: October 29 - November 3, 2018.

== Publications ==
The most important publication of the IRCTP is the proceedings of the biannual symposia. They are usually prepared under the editorship of Rusudan Tsurtsumia and Joseph Jordania. All the papers of the previous symposia are freely available on the website of the IRCTP on both Georgian and English languages

Bulletins are another periodic publication of the IRCTP Centre also published several collections of the articles, including Seventeen Arguments on Georgian Polyphony and numerous audio and video materials.

- Gabisonia, Tamaz. (2013). "Traditional Polyphony of the Maasai" (PDF). Bulletin of the International Research Center for Traditional Polyphony. 15. International Research Center for Traditional Polyphony, Tbilisi Vano Sarajishvili State Conservatory – via polyphony.ge.
- Gabisonia, Tamaz. (2013). "Traditional Polyphony of the Maasai" (PDF). Bulletin of the International Research Center for Traditional Polyphony. 15. International Research Center for Traditional Polyphony, Tbilisi Vano Sarajishvili State Conservatory – via archive.org.

== See also ==
- Traditional music
