= Mravalzhamieri =

Georgian folk song

Mravalzhamieri (Georgian: მრავალჟამიერი) is a Georgian folk song, the title and the one-word text of which can be translated as "[may you live] a many life". It is a popular and widespread toasting song, with dozens of different versions from the countryside of both eastern and western parts of Georgia. There are also several variants of "urban" Mravalzhamieri, originally from Tbilisi. Mravalzhamieri is typically sung in three-voice polyphony, in which two highly improvised melodic parts are developed on the background of a pedal drone in a free metre. The Mravalzhamieri version from the region of Kakheti, and that known as "urban" (k'alak'uri) were inscribed on the Intangible Cultural Heritage of Georgia list in 2013. Mravalzhamieri is also a Georgian name of the Christian chant Polychronion.
