= Joseph Jordania =

Australian-Georgian musicologist

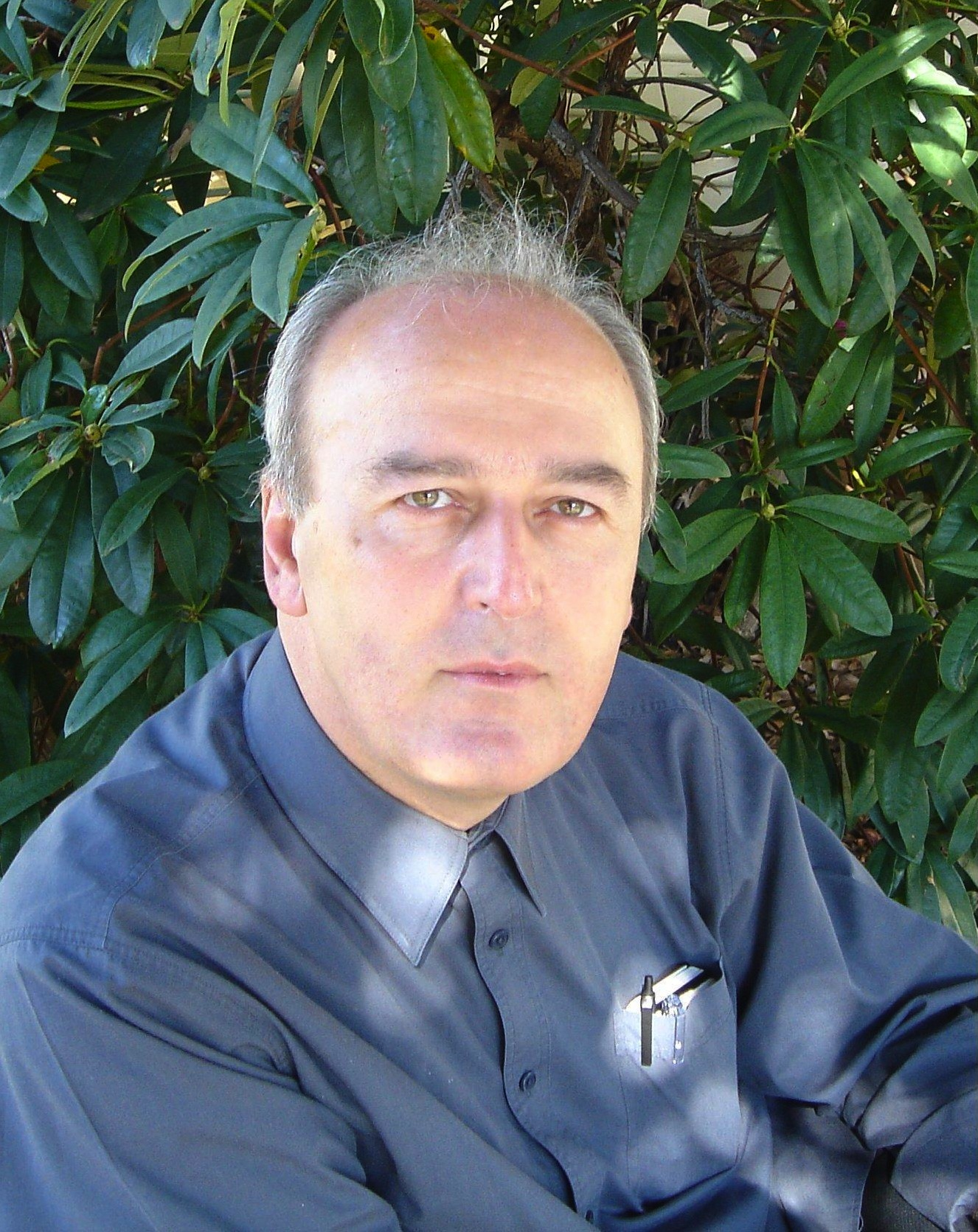
- Joseph Jordania in 2011
- Born: February 12, 1954 (age 72); Tbilisi, Georgian SSR, Soviet Union (now Georgia)
- Education: Tbilisi State Conservatory, Tbilisi State University
- Known for: The original model of the origins of choral singing in the context of human evolution; Notion of the "Battle trance"; Aposematic model of human evolution
- Awards: Fumio Koizumi Prize for ethnomusicology (2009), Centenary Medal of Australia (2003)
- Scientific career
- Fields: ethnomusicology, evolutionary musicology, evolutionary psychology, speech pathology
- Workplaces: University of Melbourne
- Doctoral advisor: Grigol Chkhikvadze
- Website: Joseph Jordania Website

Joseph Jordania (Georgian იოსებ ჟორდანია, born February 12, 1954, and also known under the misspelling of Joseph Zhordania) is an Australian–Georgian ethnomusicologist and evolutionary musicologist and professor. He is an Honorary Fellow of the Melbourne Conservatorium of Music at the University of Melbourne and the Head of the Foreign Department of the International Research Centre for Traditional Polyphony at Tbilisi State Conservatory. Jordania is known for his model of the origins of human choral singing in the wide context of human evolution and was one of founders of the International Research Centre for Traditional Polyphony in Georgia.

Jordania's academic interests include study of worldwide distribution of choral polyphonic traditions, origins of choral singing, origins of rhythm, origins of human morphology and behaviour, cross-cultural prevalence of stuttering, dyslexia and acquisition of phonological system in children, study of the cognitive threshold between animal and human cognitive abilities. His primary expertise is Georgian and Caucasian traditional music and vocal polyphony.

== Career ==
Jordania was born in Georgia (former Soviet Union). He received a BA degree in ethnomusicology from Tbilisi State Conservatory in 1978. During 1979–1983 he was elected as the President of the Board of Creative Youth of Tbilisi. In 1982 he received his PhD degree in musicology–ethnomusicology from Tbilisi Theatrical Institute, and served as lecturer, senior lecturer, assistant professor, and professor at the Department of Georgian Traditional Music at Tbilisi State Conservatory. For one year (in 1984) he served as a dean of the Faculty of Musicology. In 1991 he received the title D.Mus from Kiev Conservatory. From 1988 until 1995 Jordania was the head of the Musical Sector of the Centre of the Mediterranean Studies at the Tbilisi State University. He published his first monograph on choral polyphony in 1989. In 1984 he was instrumental in organizing the conference "Problems of Folk Polyphony". This conference became the beginning of the series of biannual international conferences (1984, 1986, 1988, 1998, 2000) and symposia (2002, 2004, 2006, 2010, 2012, 2014, 2016, 2018, 2020) on traditional polyphony, and led to establishing the International Research Centre for Traditional Polyphony at Tbilisi State Conservatory in 2003.

In 2009, in recognition of "his contribution to systematic analysis of folk polyphonies of the world, proposing a new model for the origins of traditional choral singing in a broad context of human evolution" Jordania was awarded the Fumio Koizumi Prize for ethnomusicology.

== Bibliography ==
=== Books ===
- Georgian Traditional Polyphony in the International Context of Polyphonic Culture (the Problem of Origins of Polyphony). Tbilisi State University Press (in Russian with English Summary. 1989)
- Who Asked the First Question? The Origins of Human Choral Singing, Intelligence, Language and Speech (Logos, 2006)
- Why do People Sing? Music in Human Evolution (Logos, 2011)
- Tigers, Lions and Humans: History of Rivalry, Conflict, Reverence and Love (Logos, 2014)
- Choral Singing in Human Culture and Evolution (Lambert Academic Publishers, 2015)
- Behind Jim Corbett's Stories: An Analytical Journey to 'Corbett's Places' and Unanswered Questions Together with Priyvrat Gadhvi, Preetum Gheegawo, Manfred Waltl, and Fernando Quevedo de Oliveira (Logos, 2016).
- A New Model of Human Evolution: How Predators Shaped Human Morphology and Behaviour (Lambert Academic Publishers, 2017)
- Behind Jim Corbett's Stories: Volume 2 Together with Preetum Gheerawo, Manfred Waltl, Ali Akhtar, Priyvrat Gadhvi, Fernando Quevedo de Oliveira (Logos, 2020)
- The Human Story Behind Scientific Discovery (Logos, 2020)
- Essays on Evolution of Music, Future of Education, Human Morphology and Behavior. (ELIva Press, 2024)

=== Articles and essays ===
- Jordania, J. (1980). "Original Forms of Harmony and Polyphony in Georgian Folk Songs". Musiikki. 4: 215–227 (in Finnish).
- Zhordania, J. (1984) Georgian Folk-Singing: Its Sources, Emergence and Modern Development (International Social Science Journal, Paris, UNESCO, 1984, volume 36, #3, Migration. Pages 537–549. In English, French, Spanish, Arabian, Chinese, Russian)
- Jordania, J. (1985) Problem of Emergence of Three-Part Drone Polyphony in Georgian Folk Music In J. Jordania (Ed.), Problems of Traditional Plyphony. Pg. 21–24. Problems of Traditional Polyphony Tbilisi: Sabchota Sakartvelo. (in Russian with English summary)
- Jordania, Joseph (1987). "Perspective of Comparative Study of Folk Polyphony". Sabchota Xelovneba. 3: 67–73.
- Jordania, J. (1988) Origins of Polyphony and the Problem of Geneses of Articulated Speech In J. Jordania (Ed.) Proceedings of the conference Problems of Traditional Polyphony. Pg. 21–24. Tbilisi State University Press (In Russian with English summary)
- Jordania, Joseph (1988). "Folk Polyphony, Ethnogenesis and Race Genesis". Sovietskaia Etnografia (in Russian and English). 2: 23–33.
- Jordania, J. (1989) Re-assessment of Musical Traditions of Ancient Middle Eastern Peoples: The Problem of Polyphony In I. Zemtsovsky (Ed.) Folk music: History and Typology. Pg. 75–80. Leningrad: Leningrad State Institute of Theatre, Music and Cinema Press (In Russian)
- Jordania, J. (1992) Problem of Indo-Europeans in the Light of Musical Data In Matsne, Bulletin of the Academy of Science of Georgia, Serial of History, Ethnography and Arts History, 3:42–55 (in Georgian with Russian summary)
- Jordania, J. (1997) Perspective of Interdisciplinary Research of Part-Singing Phenomenon In Christoph-Hellmut Mahling and Stephan Munch (Eds.) in Ethnomusicology and Historical Musicology – Common Goals, Shared Methodologies?. p. 211–216. Tutzing: Verlegt Bei Hans Schneider
- Jordania, J. (2000) Question Intonation, Speech Pathologies, and the Origins of Polyphony In Rusudan Tsurtsumia (Ed.) Proceedings of the International Conference “Problems of Traditional Polyphony”, held in Tbilisi, Georgia, 10–15 November 1998. Pg. 143–155. Tbilisi State Conservatory (in Georgian with extended English Summary),
- Jordania, J. (2000) "Georgia" and "North Caucasia" In Timothy Rice, James Porter and Chris Goertzen (Eds) Garland Encyclopedia of World Music. Vol. 8 Europe. Pg. 826–849, and 850–865. New York: Garland Publishing, 2000.
- Jordania, J. (2001) The Incidence of Stuttering among Chinese: Preliminary Investigation In Speech, Language and Hearing Association News, volume 5, Issue 2, April–May, pg. 2–3, Singapore, 2001.
- Jordania, J. (2001) Moral Models and Ethics in the Study of the Origins of choral Polyphony In Rusudan Tsurtsumia (Ed.) Proceedings of the International Conference “Problems of Traditional Polyphony”, held in Tbilisi, Georgia, 10–15 November 1998
- Sheree Reese with Joseph Jordania (2001). Stuttering in the Chinese Population in Some South-East Asian Countries: A Preliminary Investigation on Attitude and Incidence (American Speech Pathology Association online conference)
- Jordania, Joseph (2005) Interrogo Ergo Cogito: Responsorial Singing and the Origins of Human Intelligence (proceedings of the International Symposium on Traditional Polyphony, held in Tbilisi, Georgia in 2004). International Research Center for Traditional Polyphony of Tbilisi State Conservatory
- Jordania, Joseph (2009). "Times to Fight and Times to Relax: Singing and Humming at the Beginnings of Human Evolutionary History". Kadmos. 1: 272–277. doi:10.32859/kadmos/1/252-276. S2CID 162571333.
- Jordania, Joseph (2010). Music and Emotions: humming in Human Prehistory proceedings of the International Symposium on Traditional Polyphony, held in Tbilisi, Georgia in 2008. International Research Center for Traditional Polyphony of Tbilisi State Conservatory
- Jordania, J. (2010). Georgian Traditional Polyphony in Comparative Studies: History and Perspectives. In Rusudan Tsurtsumia & Joseph Jordania (Eds) Echoes from Georgia: Seventeen Arguments on Georgian Polyphony. Pg. 229–248. New York: Nova Science
- Brown, Steven, and Joseph Jordania. (2011). Universals in the world’s musics. Psychology of Music. Published online on December 15th, 2011.
- Jordania, J. (2011). "Sexual Selection or Natural Selection?" Kadmos, 3:400-411.
- Jordania, J. (2012). Social Factor in Traditional Polyphony: Definition, Creation, and Performance. In: Ignazio Macchiarella (ed.), Multipart music: A specific mode of musical thinking, expressive behaviour and sound. Materials of the ICTM Polyphony Study Group conference, held in Sardinia, Italy, in 2010. Pg: 163-175 Nota, Udine (ISBN 9788861630925)
- Jordania, J. (2015) "New Interdisciplinary Approach to the Study of the Origins of Traditional Polyphony". Musicology: Journal of the Institute of Musicology of SASA (Serbian Academy of Science and Arts), Vol 18, Belgrade, Pg. 77-9.
- Jordania, J. (2020). "Distribution of Singing in Arboreal and Terrestrial Species, with Implications for the Origins of Singing Behavior among Humans" Academia Letters 2020
- Jordania, J. (2021). "Can there be an Alternative Evolutionary Reason Behind the Peacock's Impressive Train?". Academia Letters, September, 2021, ".
- Jordania J. (2024) "Music as aposematic signal: predator defense strategies in early human evolution". Front Psychol. Jan 16;14:1271854. doi: 10.3389/fpsyg.2023.1271854.
- Jordania, J. (2026). "Three evolutionary functions of human music: predator defense, obtaining food, preparation for war". Frontiers in Psychology, Vol 17-2026, 15 July. https://doi.org/10.3389/fpsyg.2026.1858054.
