= Artem Erkomaishvili =

Georgian chanter (1887–1967)

- არტემ ერქომაიშვილი
- Born: 26 October 1887; Makvaneti, Kutaisi Governorate, Caucasus Viceroyalty, Russian Empire
- Died: 2 February 1967 (aged 79); Makharadze, Georgian SSR, Soviet Union
- Occupations: Singer, Chanter
- Known for: Folklore

Artem Erkomaishvili (Georgian: არტემ ერქომაიშვილი) (26 October 1887 - 2 February 1967) was a Georgian traditional chanter.

Erkomaishvili was named an Honored Art Worker of Georgia in 1951. In 1966 he recorded a selection of chants in the Shemokmedi style at the Tbilisi State Conservatory. As he was the last surviving chanter practicing the tradition, he was recorded singing all three voices of the chants, which were then mixed together using overdubbing.

The recordings are considered an invaluable document of the Shemokmedi style, as without them it would likely have been lost, chanting being prohibited during the Soviet era. Some of the recordings were remastered and released for sale in 2016.

Erkomaishvili was born in Makvaneti and died in Makharadze.
