= Kavkasia =

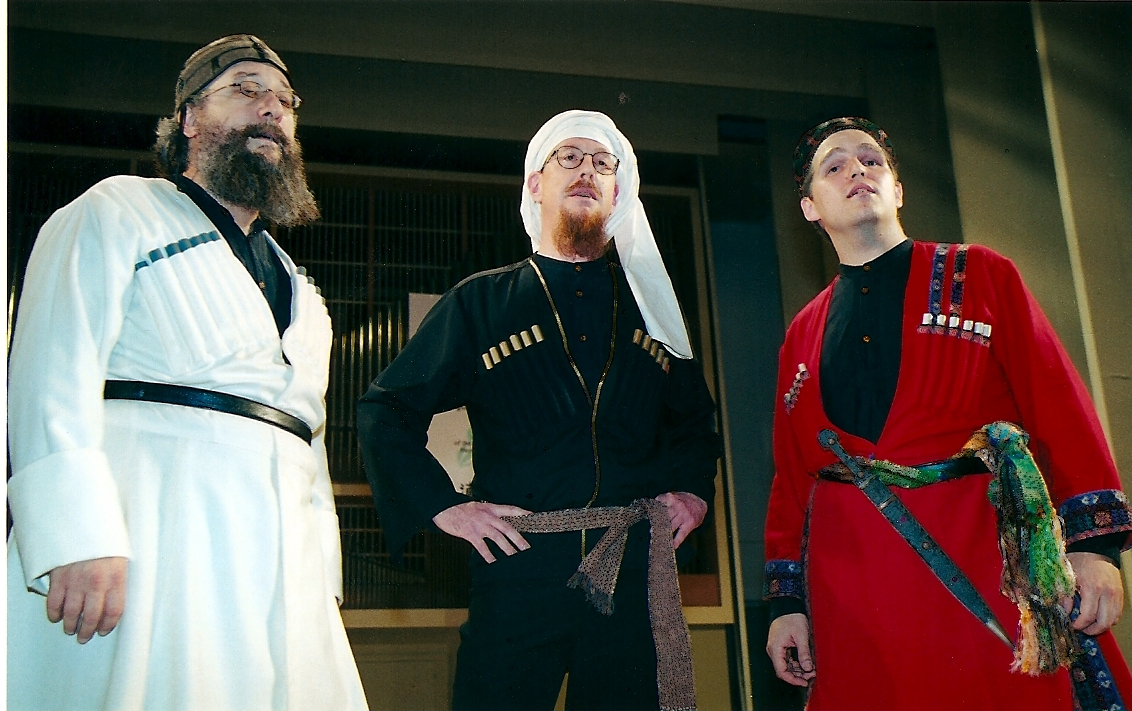
Trio Kavkasia (L-R: Alan Gasser, Stuart Gelzer, Carl Linich.

Trio Kavkasia is a U.S. trio performing traditional vocal polyphony from Georgia.

Trio Kavkasia (Georgian word for Caucasus) was formed in 1994 by Alan Gasser, Stuart Gelzer and Carl Linich, three Americans who together have more than sixty years of experience singing the traditional music of Georgia.

They sing concerts and lead workshops in North America, and they have made several extended visits to Georgia to study with singers there, both in professional ensembles and in remote villages. In 1997 each of them was made a State Prize Laureate and was awarded the Silver Medal of the Georgian Ministry of Culture "for profound knowledge of the folk music of Georgia and his role in its popularization around the world."

== Discography ==
- Songs of the Caucasus 1995 (published by Well-Tempered Productions)
- O Morning Breeze 2001 (published by Naxos World)
- The Fox and the Lion 2006 (published by Traditional Crossroads)

== See also ==
Music of Georgia
