= Apkhyarta =

Bowed long-neck lute from Abkhazia

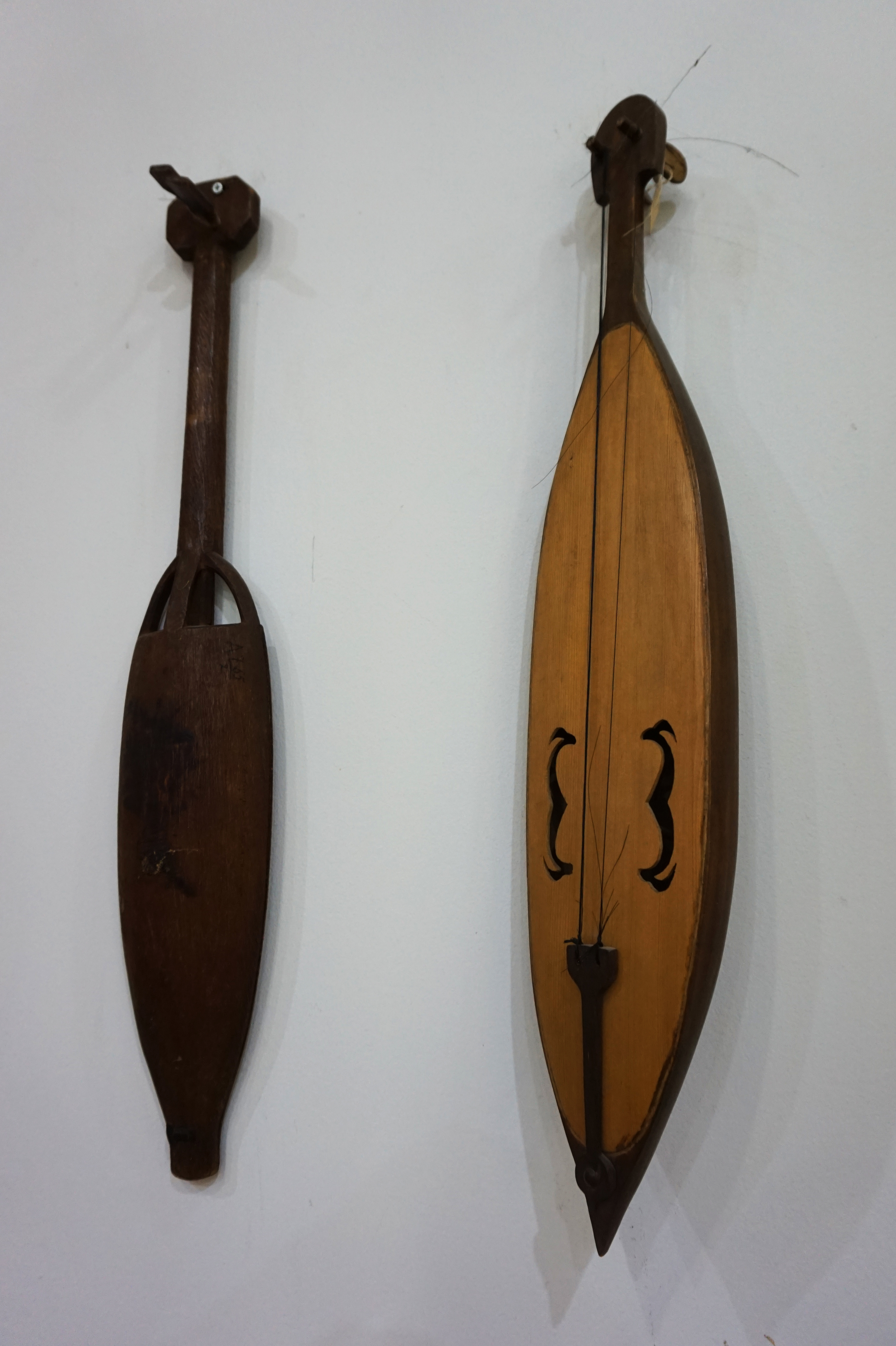
- Other names: Ap'hyartsa
- Classification: Bowed string instrument

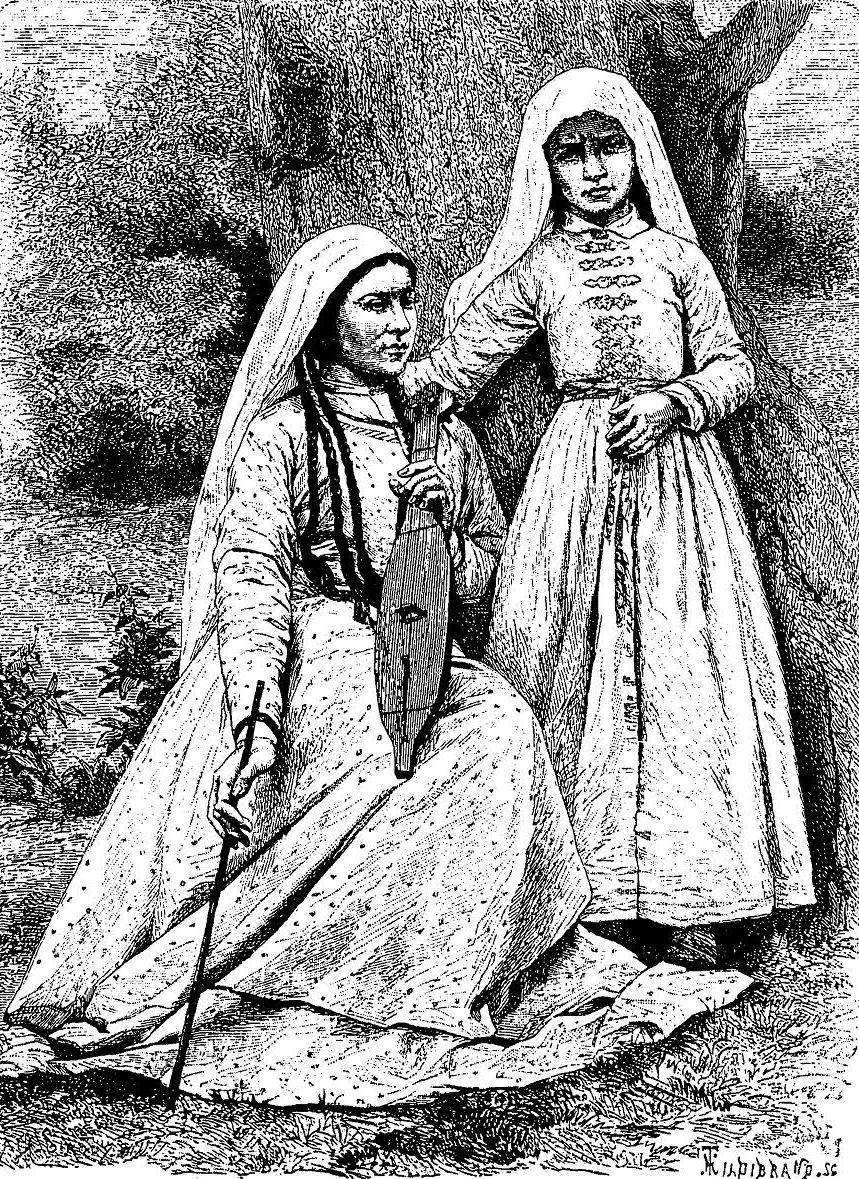

The Apkhyarta (Ap'hyartsa) is a bowed long-neck lute from Abkhazia. It has 1-2 strings and is played in Abkhazia. Also called Ap’hyartsa, it comes with a narrow spindle-shaped frame, played with a bow and usually carved from alder wood.

== See also ==
- Shichepshin
- Dala fandyr
- Chuurqin
- igil
- Morin khuur
