= Rustavi Ensemble =

Folk music ensemble

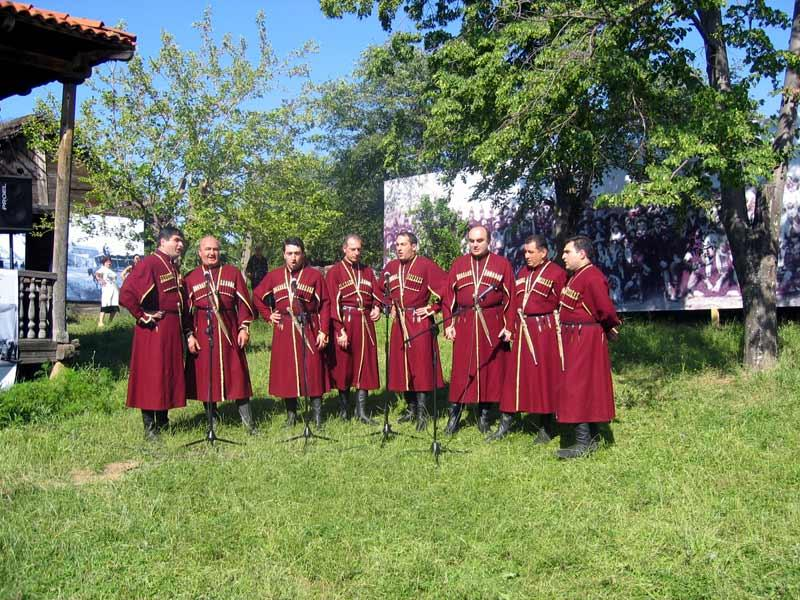
The Rustavi Ensemble performing in 2005

The Rustavi Ensemble, or the Georgian State Academic Ensemble, is a Georgian folk music ensemble that was created in 1968 by Anzor Erkomaishvili, a singer and folklorist from a distinguished Georgian musical lineage that goes back seven generations. Since its formation Rustavi has successfully toured more than 50 countries around the world.

== Overview ==
Songs and dances for work and war, elaborate costumes, the unique Georgian style of polyphonic singing and rich voices characterize the Rustavi Choir. The choir focuses on sacred hymns with their overlapping, continuously moving harmonies. Rustavi is also performing national and diverse traditional dances.

Erkomaishvili's vision was to break through ethnic boundaries of regional styles while performing ethnographically authentic music from all of Georgia. The Rustavi's performance style synthesizes the powerful, rough-hewn sound characteristic of the traditional regional folk choirs with a newer, cleaner, more finely-honed aesthetic whose orientation is towards concert presentation – nowadays on an increasingly international scale.

While striving to preserve, and in some cases recreate, authentic voicings and vocal timbres, the Rustavi singers have simplified the complex scales used by the earlier choirs in order to create firmer, more brilliant harmonies. The use of a smaller number of singers for certain songs has also helped to clarify their musical structure.

== Awards ==
The UNESCO Pacha Prize has been awarded in 2001 to the Rustavi State Academic Ensemble of Singing and Dancing for the safeguarding and promotion of Georgian polyphonic singing in the Republic of Georgia.

== Recordings and performances ==
In August 1997, Rustavi performed a set of seventeen songs at the BBC Proms in London, under the direction of Erkomaishvili.

In 1998, the group recorded the CD Mirangula under the name Rustavi Folk Choir, which has allowed for a wider appreciation of their music outside Georgia. This CD included the folk love song Tsintskaro which has had some popularity globally. The compilation record Georgian Voices sought to emulate the success of Le Mystère des Voix Bulgares by recording what could be sold to the Western world as a male version of the popular Bulgarian State Television Female Vocal Choir.

In September 2025, Rustavi performed again at the BBC Proms in the Royal Albert Hall, London., as a part of a programme with mandolinist Avi Avital, that featured music from some of the countries that border the Black Sea. Following this event, Rustavi also performed in Hastings, Sussex and in Warsaw, Poland.
