= Georgian accordion =

Button
- Classification: Free reed aerophone

Related instruments
- Piano accordion; Harmonica

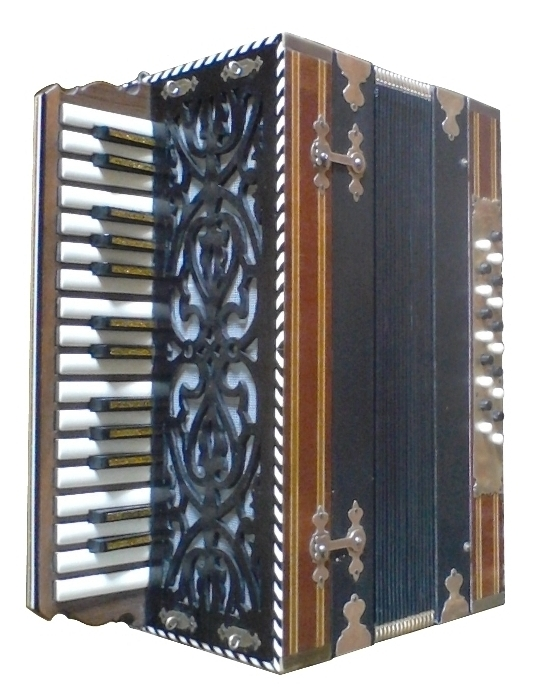
Georgian accordion

The Georgian accordion or Georgian Garmoni (Georgian: ქართული გარმონი) is a traditional musical instrument of Georgia. It is especially popular in Tusheti and in Racha. Garmonis can be diatonic or chromatic. This instrument has been modified in the music of different peoples. The result of such adaptation are its varieties disseminated in the Caucasus – Caucasian garmoni, Azerbaijani garmoni, Asian garmoni, Ossetian iron-kandzal-pandir, Adyghean and Kabardyno-Balkarian pshine, Dagestanian komuz, etc. In the Caucasus, the garmoni was introduced in the 19th century.

There are three types of Georgian garmoni:

1. early – the so-called Tushetian garmoni;
2. miniature (buzika, tsiko-tsiko)
3. late – the so-called bass garmoni.

Garmoni can be of different sizes depending on the type and individual customer's request.

== History ==
The Georgian accordion was created in the second half of the 19th century, presumably by German colonists who lived in Georgia since 1818. They were made individually in workshops.

== Structure ==
Tushetian garmonis are typically 35 cm high, 17 cm wide; the sizes of tsiko-tsiko are 10 cm / 4 cm, those of bass garmoni are 40 cm / 20 cm.

== Types ==
Tushetian garmonis are especially popular in the East Georgian mountainous regions, specifically in Tusheti. This type of Georgian garmoni was created relatively early. Tushetian garmonis can be both diatonic and chromatic, having different bass systems. These garmonis typically have 19 basses, however there also are the ones with 12, 11 and 8 basses. As a rule, the Tushetian garmoni has 18 diatonic keys. Accordingly, chromatic instruments have 12 additional semitone keys. Bass systems can also be diatonic or chromatic. The Tushetian garmoni has a characteristic appearance, but there also are Tushetian garmonis with different designs. Most Georgian garmonis have an interesting shutter mechanism – a hook and a loop inside the body. It opens when the instrument is moved forward and closes when moved back. Miniature diatonic pocket garmonis (tsiko-tsiko and buzika/muzika), which are visually similar to Georgian traditional garmonis, are found in Kartli-Kakheti, East Georgian mountainous regions, and Racha. Buzika is a little bigger than Tsiko-tsiko, and as a rule, they both have one diatonic octave and 2-3 basses; in some cases they have no bass at all. A later type of Georgian garmoni is the so-called Bass garmoni. It likely originated as a development of Tushetian garmoni. Unlike the Tushetian garmoni, the bass garmoni has 80 basses, and so its name implies multiplicity of basses. This type of garmoni is larger in size and has 21 diatonic and 14 semitone keys. Its keys are wider as compared to Caucasian garmoni. Tusherian and miniature garmonis have different playing techniques. The technique for Tushetian garmoni is similar in Tusheti and Racha. However, the Tushetian style of playing is more ornamented and melismatic.

== Repertoire ==
Music performed on traditional garmonis include dance melodies, lyrical love songs, epic and humorous songs, and more rarely, travelers' songs and dirges. In the round dance "Korbeghela," the garmoni does not follow the melody, but instead has the function of bass. It should be mentioned that in the music of some ethnographic regions, the garmoni has replaced traditional instruments (such as the panduri, chianuri, chiboni). It has become an ensemble instrument in urban areas. Unlike the instruments introduced from abroad (mandolin, guitar, dududki, zurna), the garmoni underwent serious changes in Georgia, acquiring an original form and appearance.

== See also ==
- Music of Georgia (country)
