= Chakrulo =

Georgian polyphonic choral folk song

A 1957 recording of "Chakrulo" performed by the Georgian State Folk Song and Dance Ensemble.

Chakrulo (Georgian: ჩაკრულო, transliterated: chak'rulo) is a Georgian polyphonic choral folk song. It is a three-part song from the region of Kakheti, dramatising preparations for a battle. It is characterised by two highly ornamented individual vocal parts over a choral foundation.

When Georgian vocal polyphony was recognized by UNESCO, as an Intangible Heritage masterpiece in 2001, "Chakrulo" was cited as a prime example. "Chakrulo" was one of 27 musical compositions included on the Voyager Golden Records that were sent into space appended to Voyager 2 on 20 August 1977, and Voyager 1 on 5 September 1977.

== See also ==
- UNESCO Intangible Cultural Heritage Lists
- Music of Georgia (country)
