= Larchemi =

Ancient Georgian wind instrument

- Classification: wind
- Hornbostel–Sachs classification: Edge-blown aerophones (The player blows against the sharp rim at the upper open end of a tube)

Playing range
- sixth

Related instruments
- panpipes

The larchemi (Georgian: ლარჭემი), or soinari (Georgian: სოინარი), is an ancient Georgian musical instrument of the panpipe family. It is known as "larchemi" in Samegrelo and "soinari" in Guria, but there is no difference in the instrument; those in Guria may be smaller. The larchemi was in the past found also in Abkhazia, Imereti and Lazeti (where it was called ostvinoni). By 1958, when it was studied by Kakhi Rosebashvili, it had largely disappeared.

The larchemi consists of a row of six reed pipes. Two bass pipes in the middle are tuned a second apart; the other pipes are tuned in thirds from them. The instrument can be played by two performers, who take three pipes each.
