= Pan flute =

Musical instrument, typically made from bamboo

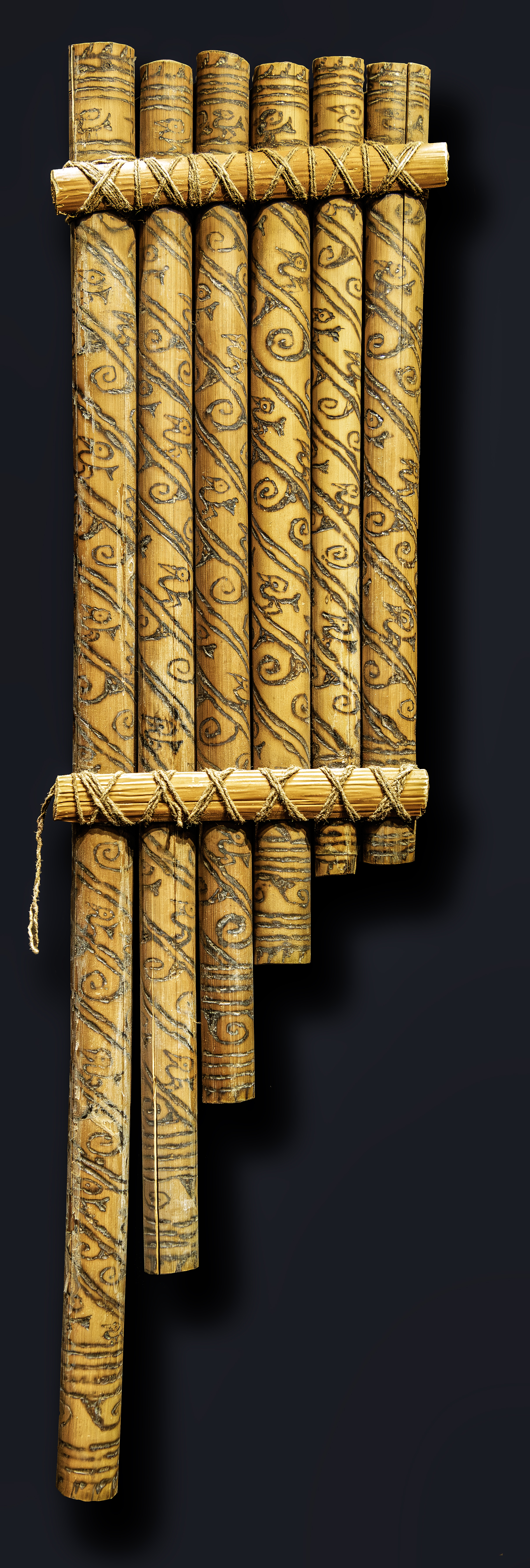
The siku is an Andean pan flute

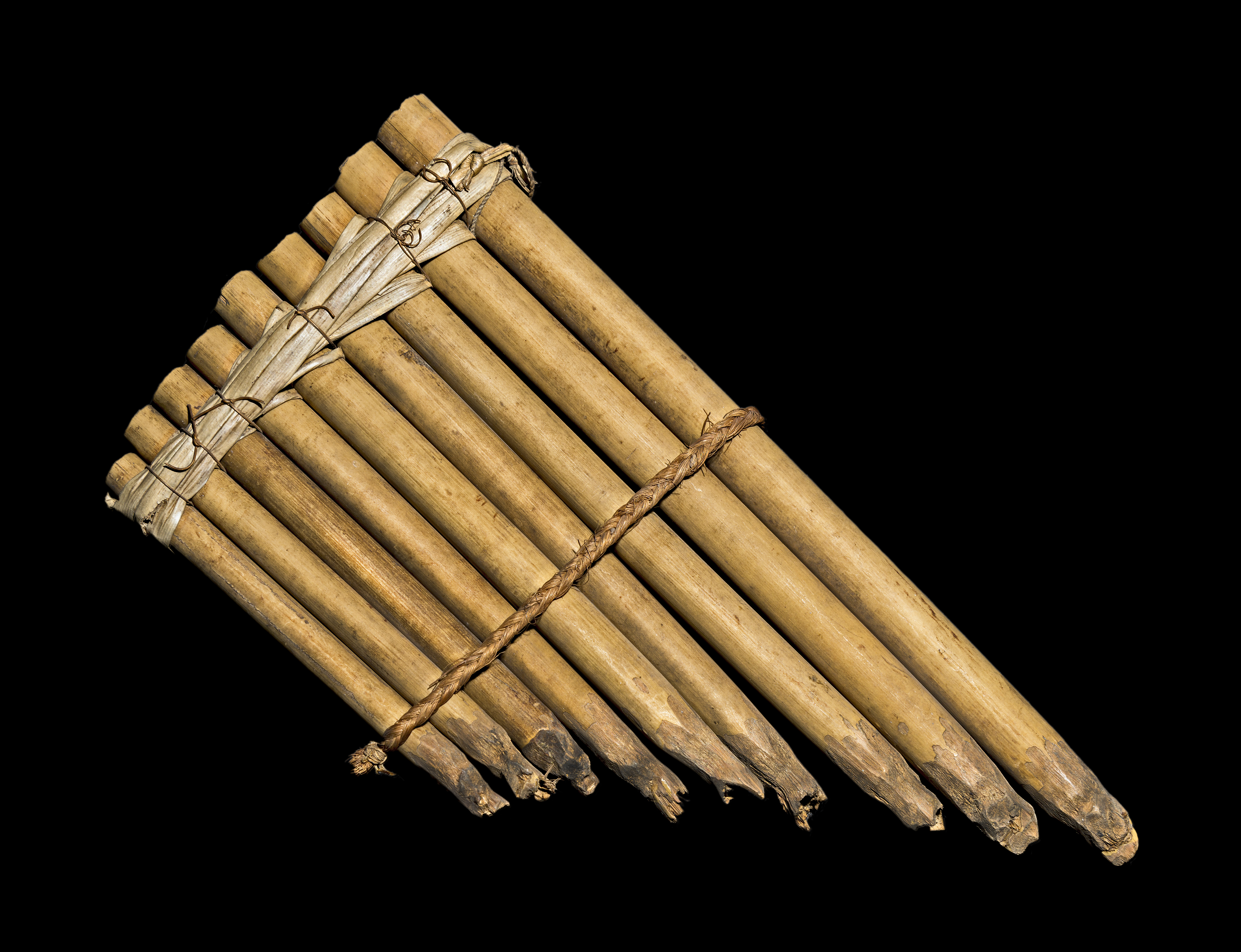
This pan flute from the Solomon Islands is made from bamboo bound with reeds and rope

A pan flute (also known as panpipes or syrinx) is a musical instrument based on the principle of the closed tube, consisting of multiple pipes of gradually increasing length (and occasionally girth). Numerous varieties of pan flutes have been popular as folk instruments. The pipes are typically made from bamboo, giant cane, or local reeds. Other materials include wood, plastic, metal, and clay.

== Name ==
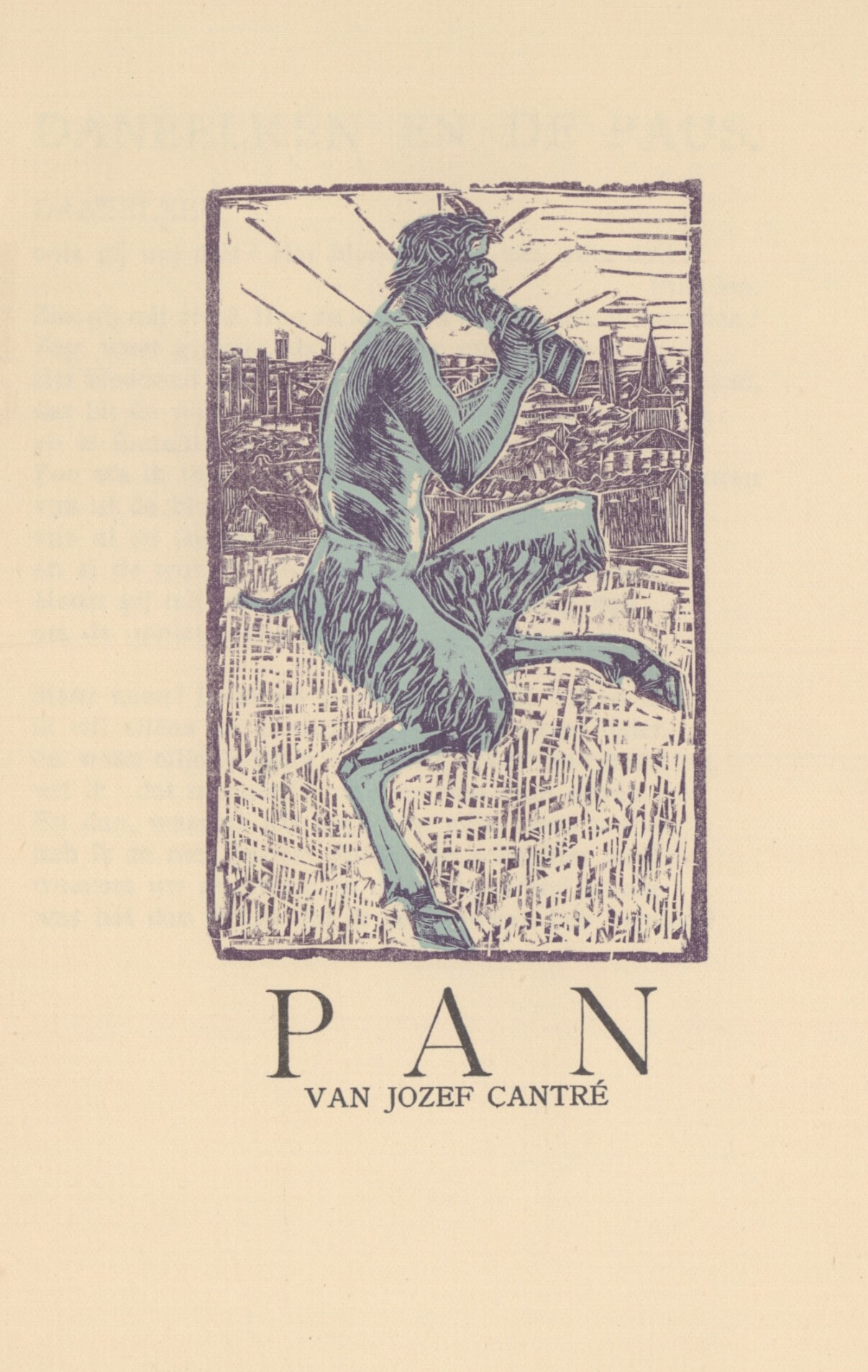
The god Pan playing on his Pan flute. Excerpt from the Flemish magazine Regenboog. Draft for the woodcut Pan of Jozef Cantré. Published in 1918.

The pan flute is named after Pan, the Greek god of nature and shepherds, often depicted with such an instrument.

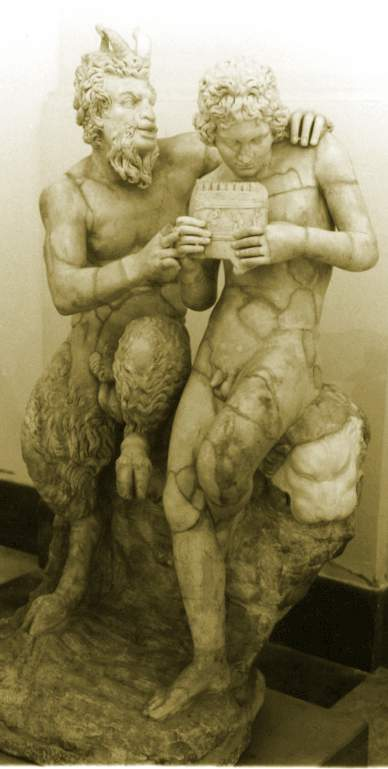
Pan and Daphnis – 1st century BC Roman replica of 2nd century BC Greek original

The pan flute has become widely associated with the character Peter Pan created by Sir James Matthew Barrie, whose name was inspired by the god Pan.

In Greek mythology, Syrinx (Σύριγξ) was a forest nymph. In her attempt to escape the affection of god Pan (a creature half goat and half man), she was transformed into a water-reed or calamos (cane-reed). Then, Pan cut several reeds, placed them in parallel one next to the other, and bound them together to make a melodic musical instrument. Ancient Greeks called this instrument Syrinx, in honour of the Muse, and Pandean, or Pan-pipes and Pan-flute, after Pan. (Syrinx was a different musical instrument from Aulos. Aulos is often translated as "flute" or "double flute" in English).

The Syrinx, a predominantly pastoral instrument for the Greeks, was adopted by the Etruscans who played it at their festivals and banquets; the Etruscans called it fistula. The Romans adopted the Syrinx from the Greeks and the Etruscans, and they too played it at their banquets, festivals, as well as in religious and funeral processions.

== Structure ==
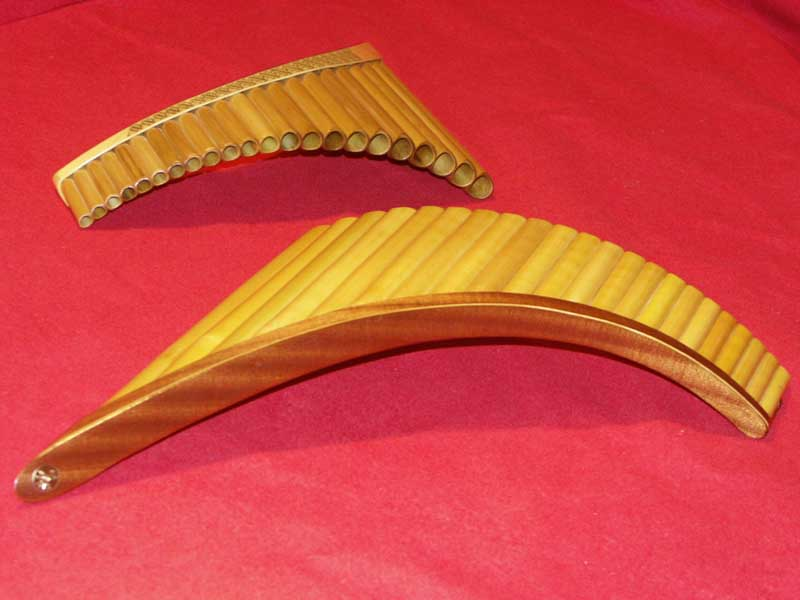
Two Romanian pan flutes

The pan flute's tubes are stopped at one end, at which the standing wave is reflected giving a note an octave lower than that produced by an open pipe of equal length. In the traditional South American style, pipes are fine-tuned to correct pitch by placing small pebbles or dry corn kernels into the bottom of the pipes. Contemporary makers of curved Romanian-style panpipes use wax (commonly beeswax) to tune new instruments. Special tools are used to place or remove the wax. Corks and rubber stoppers are also used, and are easier to quickly tune pipes.

=== Acoustics ===
The pan flute is an end-blown flute. Sound is produced by the vibration of an air-stream blowing across an open hole at the end of a resonating tube. The length of the tube determines the fundamental frequency. An overblown harmonic register is near a 12th above the fundamental in cylindrical tubes, but can approach an octave jump (8th) if a decreasing taper is used.

According to the Fundamental Principle for pan flutes, the frequency and the length of the tube are inversely proportional. Every time the pitch goes up one octave, the frequency doubles. Because there are 12 notes in a chromatic scale or a full octave, every half-step in a chromatic scale is multiplied by the 12th root of 2 to get the note next to it. By this, it is possible to calculate the length of any pipe, given that one knows the length of any one pipe. The formula for calculating the length of a pan flute pipe is L = (c / f) / 4 (the "theoretical length" L equals the speed of sound c = 343 m/s, divided by the desired frequency in hertz f, that quantity divided by 4; this simplifies and rearranges to: Length of pipe (in centimeters) × Frequency (in hertz) = 8575). Because of a property of compression within the tube, the length must be a little shorter to correct flat pitch. The extra length is helpful for a maker, who can use a cork or plug at the bottom to adjust the pitch. Some instruments use wax or pellets to tune the fundamental pitch of each tube. A tube that has a diameter 1/10 of its length yields a typical tone colour (see Timbre). An inner diameter range between 1/7 and 1/14 of the length L is acceptable. A narrow tube will sound "reedy", while a wide one will sound "flutey". A more exact method is to multiply the bore diameter by 0.82 and subtract this value from the tube length. This compensates for internal compression slowing frequency and the lips partially covering the voicing. Only tiny adjustments will be needed then to adjust fundamental pitch for air density and temperature.

== Playing ==
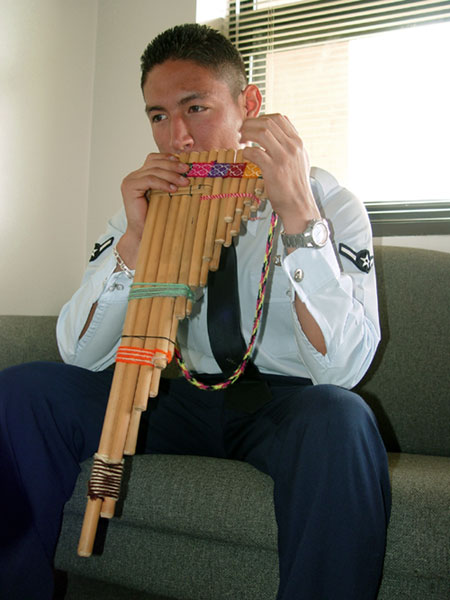
A Peruvian-American airman playing an Incan zampoña

The pan flute is played by blowing horizontally across an open end against the sharp inner edge of the pipes. Each pipe is tuned to a keynote, called the fundamental frequency. By overblowing, that is, increasing the pressure of breath and tension of lips, odd harmonics (notes whose frequencies are odd-number multiples of the fundamental), near a 12th in cylindrical tubes, may also be produced. The Romanian pan flute has the pipes arranged in a curved array, solidly glued together, unlike Andean versions, which are usually tied together. Thus, the player can easily reach all the notes by simply swiveling the head, or by moving the instrument with the hands. These instruments can also play all the sharps and flats, with a special technique of both tilting the pipes and jaw movement, thus reducing the size of the pipe's opening and producing a change in pitch. A very advanced player can play any scale and in any key. There are two styles of vibrato possible, hand vibrato and breath vibrato. In hand vibrato, the pitch is shifted up and down, like a vocal vibrato. The player gently moves one end of the pan flute (usually the high end) somewhat similar to violin vibrato. Breath, or throat vibrato, which is more accurately described as a tremolo or volume swell, is the same technique used by players of the flute and other woodwinds by use of the player's diaphragm, or throat muscles.

== Variations ==
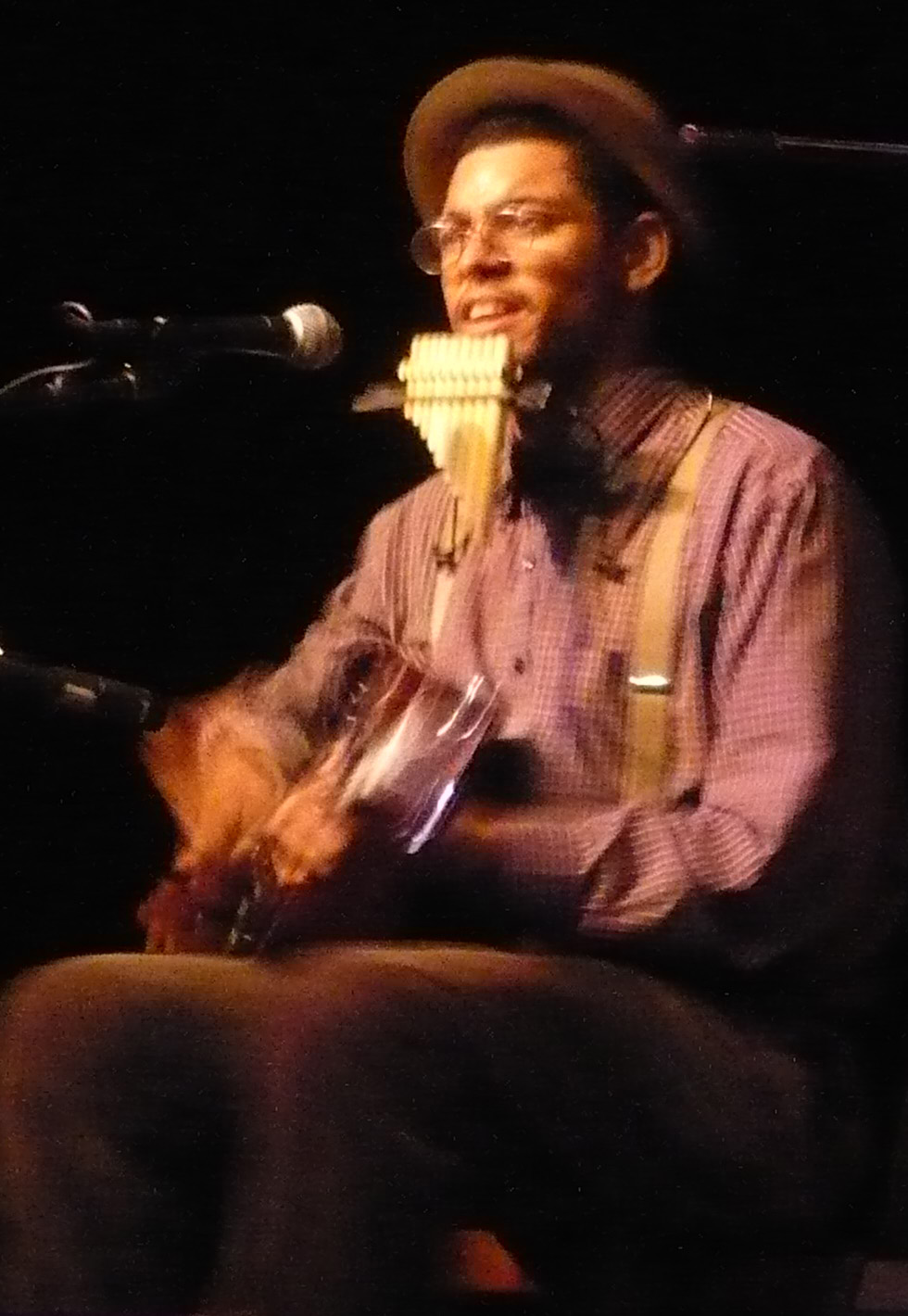
American musician Dom Flemons of the Carolina Chocolate Drops plays the quills, a traditional African-American pan flute, suspending it in front of his mouth with a harmonica rack

The curved-style pan flute was popularized by the Romanian musician Gheorghe Zamfir, who toured extensively and recorded many albums of pan flute music in the 1970s, and by several other artists who began recording at the same time. Today there are thousands of devoted players across Europe, Asia and the Americas. Both the curved and traditional South American variations are also very popular in Peruvian traditional groups and other Andean music. In Bolivia, the panpipes of the altiplano are known as jula-jula, and those of the Andean range as julu-julu.

In Laos and Thailand, there is a cylindrical version called the wot, used in folk music from the Isaan region of the country. The player alters notes by rotating the instrument with the hands, rather than by head movements.

Panpipes are used in varieties of African traditional music, typically constructed from bamboo. The ngororombe, often accompanied by percussion instruments in ensembles, is found in northeastern Zimbabwe. The Nyungwa tribe in Malawi also use the ngororombe and use the same term to refer to the dance that accompanies playing of the instrument; the term nyanga is also employed for the instrument.

Some new designs are beginning to appear, as designers and makers take advantage of computer-aided design and 3D additive manufacturing, to move past the limitations of traditional tool and materials. These new pan flutes address some long-standing issues to make it an easier instrument to learn and to play accurately.

=== Types ===
- Paixiao
- Trstenice
- Wot
- Nai (Romania, Moldova).
- Siku
- Kuvytsi, Svyryli, Rebro, Nai (Ukraine)
- A small panflute called chiflo or xipro was used by Galician mobile knife sharpeners in Portugal, Spain, Argentina and Mexico, who blew quick, loud scales to announce their arrival in the neighborhood. They were traditionally bored from a block of wood, but more recently have been cast in plastic.
- The firlinfeu is a popular folk instrument in Brianza, the province of Monza and the southern sides of provinces of Lecco and Como (Italy).
- Quills, an African-American instrument known primarily through the recordings of Henry Thomas in the 1920s, and the Delta blues musician Sid Hemphill. More recently, Dom Flemons has revived the playing of the quills.
- Soinari
- Larchemi

== Notable pan flute musicians ==
- Gheorghe Zamfir (Romanian)
- Leo Rojas (Ecuadorian)
- Henry "Ragtime Texas" Thomas (American, played a variant known as "quills")
- Dana Dragomir (Romanian/Swedish)
- Ian Anderson from Jethro Tull (British)

== See also ==
- List of flautists
- Fife and drum blues
