= Salamuri =

Georgian wind instrument

- Classification: Woodwind; Wind; Aerophone

Related instruments
- Dilli Kaval; Shvi

The salamuri (Georgian: სალამური) is a Georgian wind instrument which resembles a recorder. It is a staple part of Georgian folk music, and is ancient in origin, with early examples being in bone. Modern salamuris are made from wood, especially apricot or walnut. There are two main varieties, reeded and non-reeded, which require different techniques of crafting and playing. One player can sometimes play two salamuris at once by using either hand.

== Description ==
The salamuri is a widespread wind musical instrument found in all regions of Georgia (especially in Kartli, Kakheti, Meskheti, Tusheti, Pshavi, and Imereti). Relics obtained from archaeological excavations prove the existence of the salamuri in Georgia during ancient times.

== Types of salamuri ==
In Georgia, there are two kinds of salamuris preserved till the present day: reeded and unreeded salamuri. These two kinds of salamuri differ in their timber, form, sound range and resonance. The unreeded salamuri represents a pipe of approx. 380-400mm in length. It has 8 front keys and sometimes one key on the backside. The first front key is placed 13 cm. apart from the head, but the other 6 front keys are separated by equal distance (3 cm). It is often made from cane, apricot-tree, reed and elder. It becomes slightly narrower towards the end to form a mouthpiece. The unreeded salamuri has a diatonic scale of one octave; however, this range can be somewhat extended by overblowing. The unreeded salamuri is mainly used in parts of east Georgia (Kakheti, Kartli, Meskheti, Tusheti and Pshavi).

The reeded salamuri also has 8 front keys and one back key (between front first and second keys), and it has the same chromatic range as the unreeded version. The reed of this salamuri is a small tap (1,2-1,5 cm) inside the pipe. Reeded salamuri are more often made out of walnut and apricot trees. Despite the fact that the reeded salamuri is smaller than the unreeded one at 23–36 cm, it has a wider sound range and can be described as "richer-sounding." It is more difficult to design the reeded salamuri and requires mastery in carving it. The wood material for salamuri should be proportionally grown up, straight, carefully cut down and drilled from the beginning to the end. The hollow and surface should be well-polished. Then the head of the pipe is cut and the reed is attached in its place. On the surface, the area of reed is a bit cut off. Only from this air way the air should be emitted, which why the blowing part (neck) is entirely closed. Then they cut 8 oval front keys along the instrument's reed. They should be separated from each other by equal distance (2 cm). The 9th key is cut out on the opposite side of the pipe (between first and the second keys). Thus, the salamuri is divided into three parts: the head or neck part, the body, and the bottom opening. Each of them has its own size and a certain interrelation. The closer the first key is to the reed of the instrument, the more high-pitched sound is produced. Salamuris are usually played by men. The reeded salamuri is widely spread all over Georgia. As an instrument, the salamuri expresses a pastoral atmosphere; consequently, the salamuri's repertoire mainly consists of shepherd melodies. It was often accompanied combined with “Doli” (drum).

The reeded salamuri seems to be originated a bit later than the unreeded one, and it was a popular folk instrument all over Georgia.

=== Differing techniques ===
Professional salamuri players say that there is a difference between techniques of performance on these instruments: the reeded salamuri is more difficult to play than the unreeded one. However, one can play any melody he/she wants on the reeded salamuri. The technical abilities of the unreeded salamuri are limited.

When designing the salamuri, masters take into account with which instrument it is going to be played. According to this, they define the octave range of the instrument. The masters can design two kinds of salamuris: I-part and II-part (deep-voiced salamuri is also produced).

== Origin and cultural influence ==
According to the people's belief, the sorrows of human being were the reason for making the salamuri. A folktale states that when the first reed grew up on the orphan's grave, the wind blew and the reed moaned in a sad voice. Salamuri was an inseparable close friend of a farmer that cheered him up in times of sorrow and sweetened his merriments. According to people's belief, nothing can destroy a reed pipe; even fire cannot damage it. The parents’ faces are seen through its ashes and even the broken parts emit sweet tunes. According to some of the legends, people were presented with this instrument by God. That is why it is considered to be a divine musical instrument.

Georgian people, when creating each musical instrument tried resemble the nature's sounds with them. For instance, the salamuri's tunes sounds like birds’ song. According to legends, salamuri's tunes cheered people up, tamed animals, makes birds sing, its sad tunes relieved human sorrows. According to one tale, the salamuri's sad tunes could even make the grass cry.

== Place in Georgian music ==
Today this instrument has a stable place in Georgian folk ensembles. It has been traveling all over the world together with the spirited Georgian dances and has been spreading the sweet tunes of the Iberian salamuri. When covering salamuri by our fingers while slightly blowing we get C of the first octave. We pronounce the sound “T”. When lifting one low finger completely we get the sound D and if we lift the finger partly from C we get C. If we lift a finger from D completely we get E and lifting finger partly from E we get E. Then comes F when completely lifting the finger from E and when lifting a finger partly from F we get F. The G comes, partly lifting G, then A, B, completely lifting, H- lifting partly. When covering by all the fingers and blowing strongly we get C of the second octave. The sounds of the second octave we can get by lifting the fingers and blowing more strongly.

== Notable examples ==
In 1930 a bone salamuri (flute) was found together with other things in ancient burials of Samtavro in Mtskheta. Supposedly it dates back to the 15th-13th centuries B.C.

Currently this salamuri is kept in the "Simon Janashia Museum of Georgia". Researchers have produced four unique sounds from this artifact. It is believed that this artifact could produce a tetra chord that differs from the later Greek tetra chord formation. Additionally, it appears that it might be possible to issue 10 sounds from it, not by over-blowing, but by inclining the instrument in different angles.

Among the relics found by an archaeological expedition in Mtskheta, Georgia, a bone pipe, found in 1938 at the northern section of Samtavro's sepulchre. This salamuri is made of swan (shin) bone. It is unreeded and has only three small keys on the front side. The surface of the instrument is well polished. Its length is 19.9 cm. The size of blowing part is 1.1 cm and the bottom part is 1.8 cm. It was found along with the remains of a 14-15-year-old boy in a grave. Other items contained in this grave included earthenware, crockery, arms, clothes, and a talisman. There were sheep bones, a bull's head and feet bones there as well, and thus, the guide of the expedition the academician Iv. Djavakhishvili called it “The grave of a little shepherd”. The examination of sepulchre dated it back to the 12th-11th century B.C. Based on the design of the instrument, it appeared to have been widely spread in Georgia sometime before then. Bone-pipes (salamuris) were also found in the monastery at Uplistsikhe.
