= List of dining events =

Notable dining events, feasts and banquets

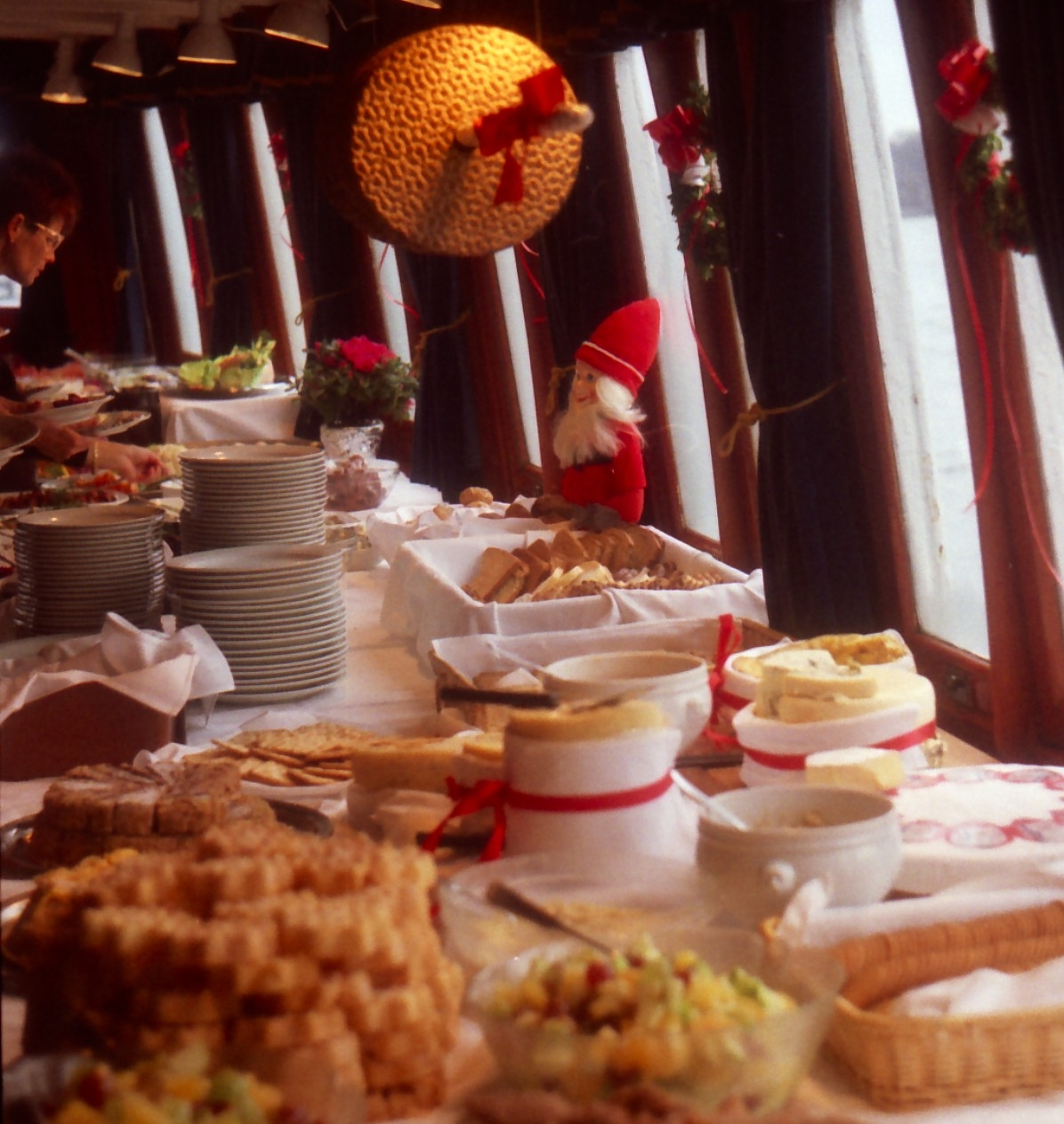
Foods at a Scandinavian Julebord banquet

This is a list of historic and contemporary dining events, which includes banquets, feasts, dinners and dinner parties. Such gatherings involving dining sometimes consist of elaborate affairs with full course dinners and various beverages, while others are simpler in nature.

== Individual events ==
- Banquet of Chestnuts – known more properly as the "Ballet of Chestnuts", refers to a fête in Rome, and particularly to a supper purportedly held in the Papal Palace by former Cardinal Cesare Borgia, son of Pope Alexander VI on 30 October 1501.
- Banquet of the Five Kings – a 1363 meeting of the kings of England, Scotland, France, Denmark and Cyprus
- Belshazzar's feast – a feast held by the Babylonian king Belshazzar, in the Book of Daniel, chapter 5, in which guests ate and drank from the vessels looted from the Temple of Jerusalem. During the feast, Belshazzar saw the apparition of a hand writing on a wall, and Daniel prophesied that the writing meant Belshazzar's kingdom was about to fall, which it did that night.
- Booker T. Washington dinner at the White House – On 16 October 1901, shortly after moving into the White House, Theodore Roosevelt invited his adviser, the African American spokesman Booker T. Washington, to dine with him and his family, and provoked an outpouring of condemnation from southern politicians and press. This reaction affected subsequent White House practice, and no other African American was invited to dinner for almost thirty years.
- Feast at Swan Goose Gate – a feast held by rebels against the Qin Dynasty in 206 BC, at the Swan Goose Gate outside Xianyang
- Feast of the Pheasant – a banquet given by Philip the Good, Duke of Burgundy on 17 February 1454 in Lille, now in France. Its purpose was to promote a crusade against the Turks, who had taken Constantinople the year before. The crusade never took place.
- Last Supper – the final meal that, in the Gospel accounts, Jesus shared with his Apostles in Jerusalem before his crucifixion.
- Supper at Emmaus – The Road to Emmaus appearance is one of the early resurrection appearances of Jesus after his crucifixion and the discovery of the empty tomb. Both the Meeting on the road to Emmaus and the subsequent Supper at Emmaus, depicting the meal that Jesus had with two disciples after the encounter on the road, have been popular subjects in art.
- Three Emperors Dinner – a banquet held at Café Anglais in Paris, France, on 7 June 1867. It was prepared by chef Adolphe Dugléré and consisted of 16 courses with eight fine wines served over eight hours. The dinner was prepared at the request of King William I of Prussia and was attended by King William I, Tsar Alexander II of Russia and his son the tsarevitch (who later became Tsar Alexander III), and Prince Otto von Bismarck.
- Trefa Banquet – a dinner held in Cincinnati, Ohio on July 11, 1883, in honor of the first graduating class of Hebrew Union College. It became controversial for serving non-kosher dishes, thereby highlighting philosophical disagreements within the Reform Jewish community.
- Beefsteak – A type of banquet in which sliced beef tenderloin is served to diners as all-you-can-eat finger food.
Historical meals

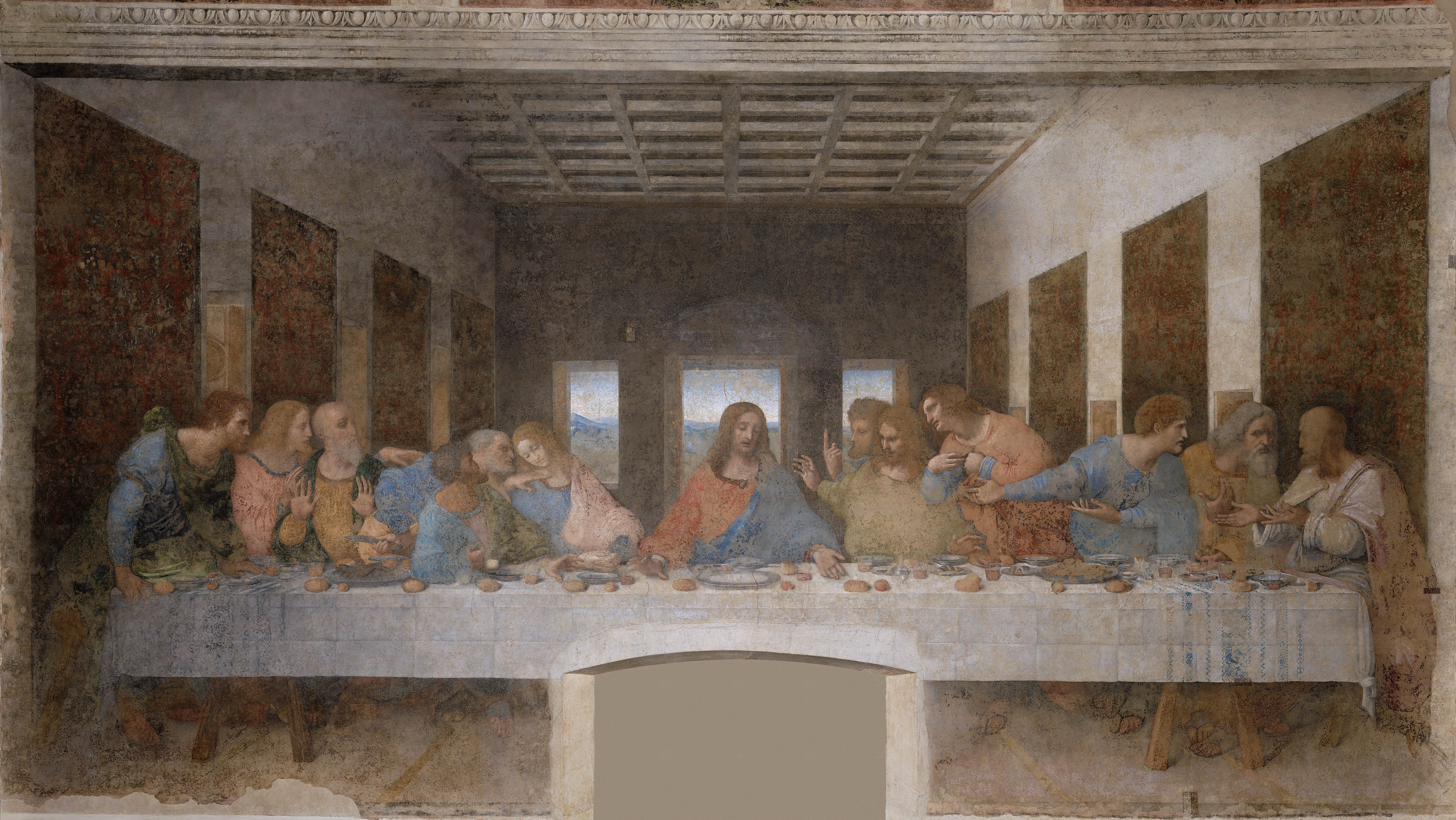
Depictions of the Last Supper have been undertaken by artistic masters for centuries; Leonardo da Vinci's late 1490s mural painting in Milan, Italy, being the best-known example.

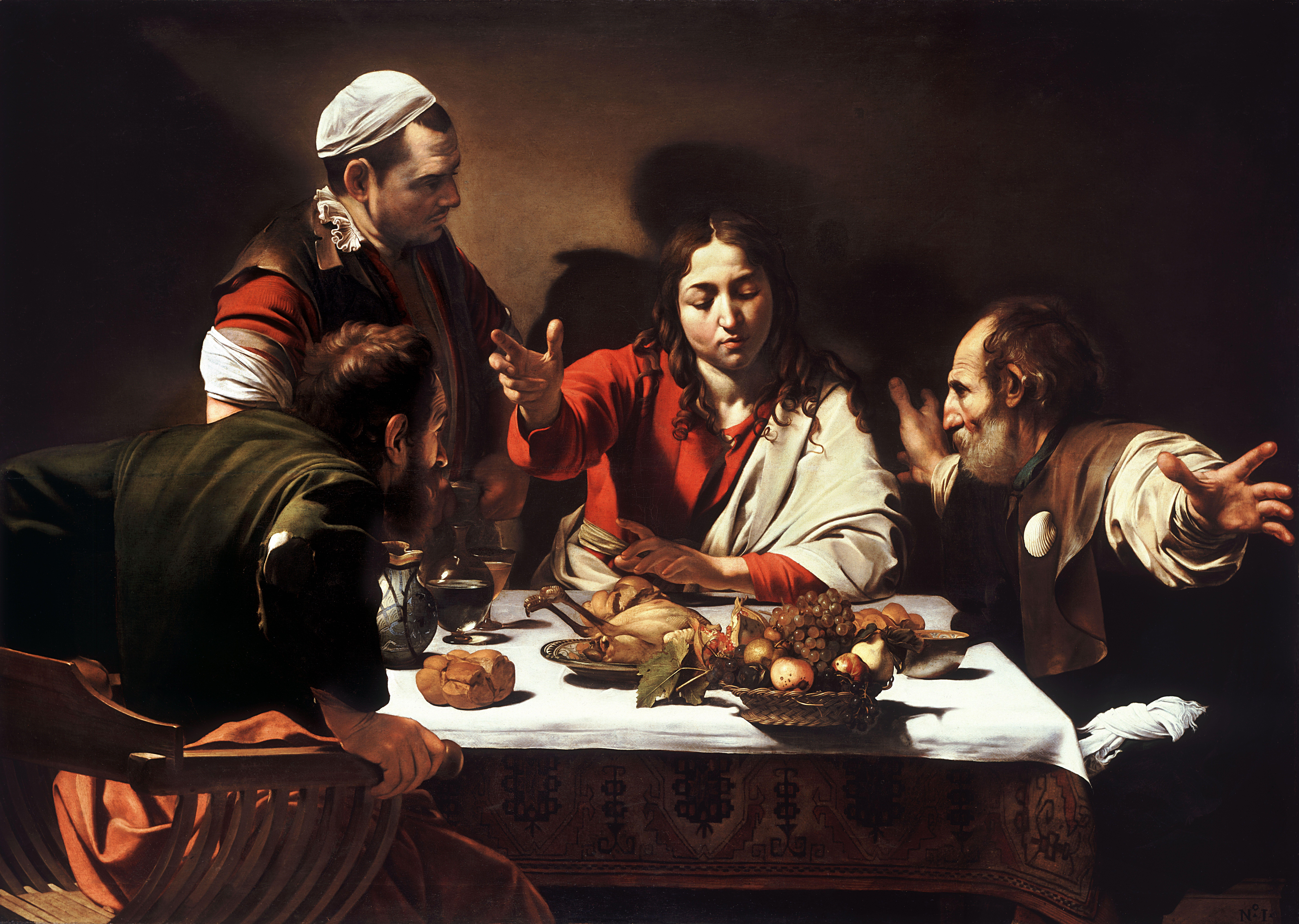
A 1601 painting of the Supper at Emmaus, by Caravaggio

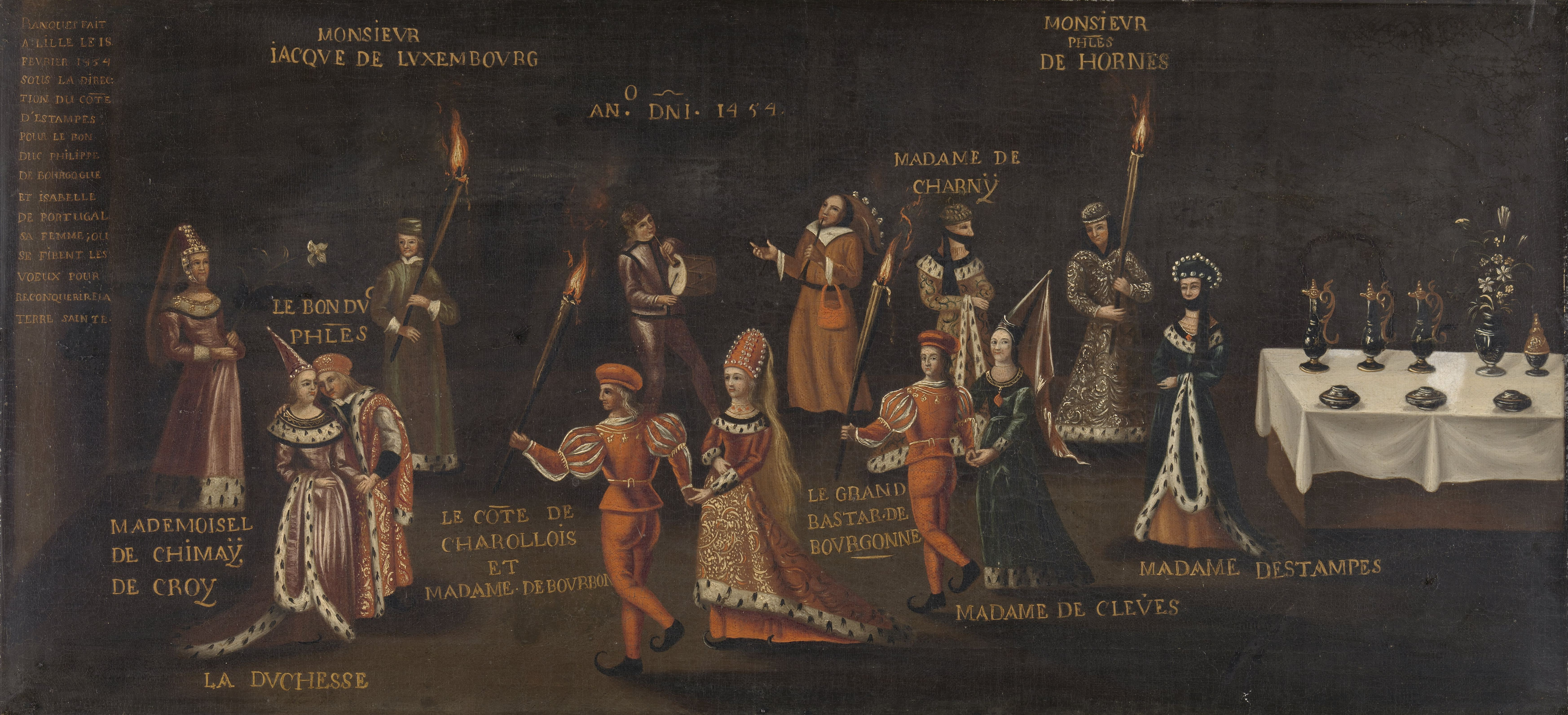
An anonymous sixteenth-century painting showing participants of the Feast of the Pheasant

== Banquets ==
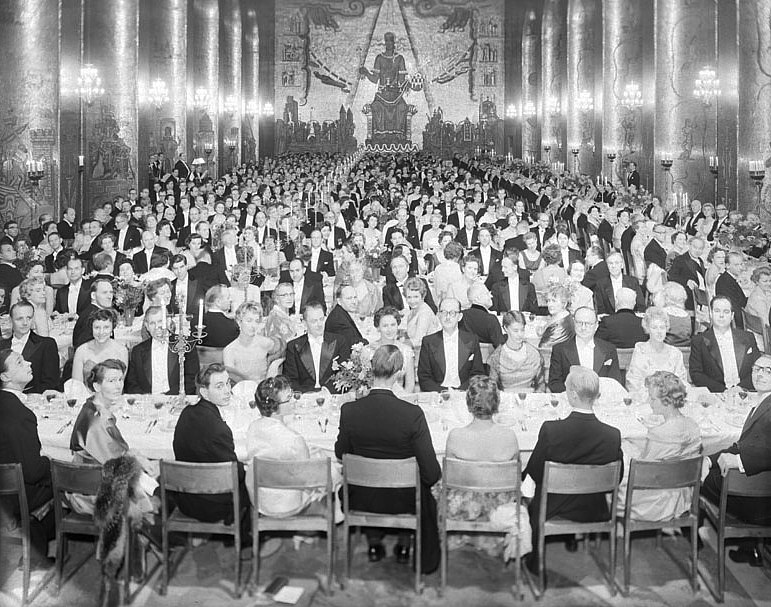
Attendees at the 1958 Nobel Banquet

- Julebord – a Scandinavian feast or banquet in the days before Christmas in December and partly November where there is served traditional Christmas food and alcoholic beverages, often in the form of a buffet. Many Julebords are characterized by large amounts of food and drink, both traditional and new, hot and cold dishes. There is often lively partying and the party can be an important social meeting place for colleagues.
- Nobel Banquet – an annual banquet held on December 10 in the Blue Hall of Stockholm City Hall, after the Nobel Prize ceremony. At the banquet, for which a formal dress code exists, a multi-course dinner is served and entertainment provided.

== Breakfasts ==
- North Melbourne Grand Final Breakfast – a breakfast function organised by the North Melbourne Football Club on the morning of the AFL Grand Final
- NRL Grand Final Breakfast – a breakfast function organised by the National Rugby League on the week of the NRL Grand Final
- Pancake breakfast – a public meal attached to many summer festivals and community events in Canada and the United States which involves volunteers cooking large quantities of pancakes and other hot breakfast foods for the general public.

== Dinners ==
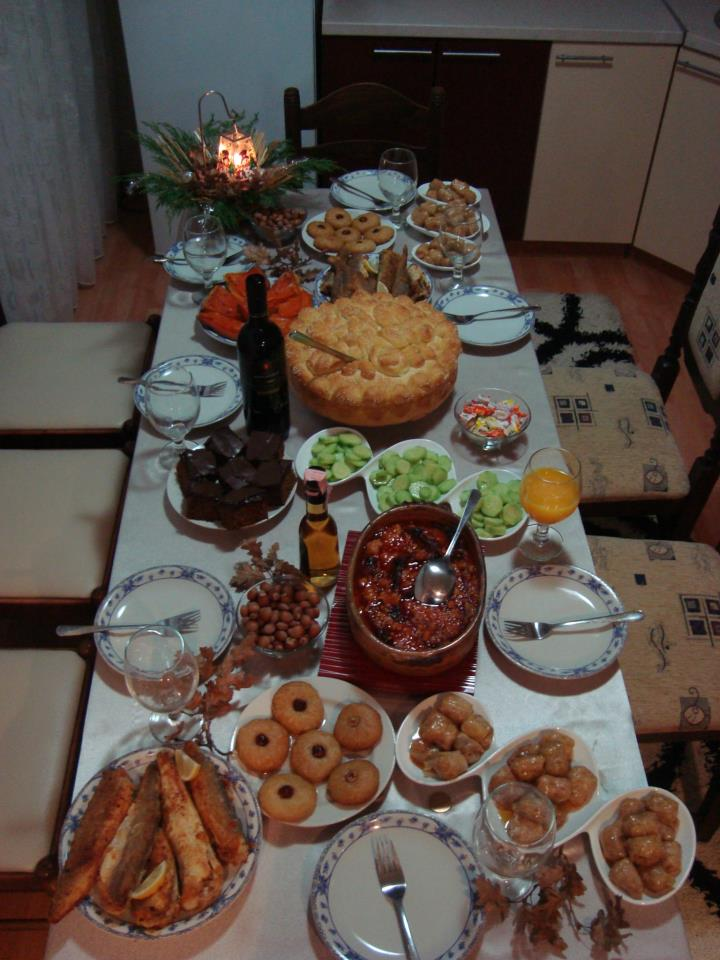
A Christmas dinner in Macedonia. Some Christmas dinners such as this one occur on Christmas Eve.

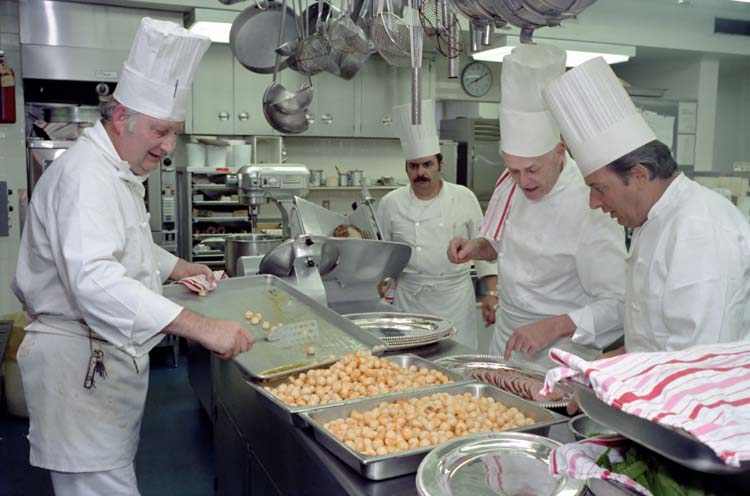
Under the direction of White House Executive Chef Henry Haller, chefs prepare food for a state dinner honoring Australian Prime Minister Malcolm Fraser in 1981.

- Bracebridge Dinner – a seven-course formal gathering at the Ahwahnee Hotel presented as a feast given by a Renaissance-era lord. Started in 1927, the Ahwahnee's first year of operation, the dinner is inspired by the fictional Squire Bracebridge's Yule celebration in a story from The Sketch Book of Geoffrey Crayon, Gent. by Washington Irving.
- Christmas dinner – a meal traditionally eaten at Christmas, which can take place any time from the evening of Christmas Eve to the evening of Christmas Day itself
- Kūčios – the traditional Christmas Eve dinner in Lithuania, held on December 24
- Passover Seder – dinner during the Jewish celebration of Passover. Usually held with family and friends. During the dinner, the host reads the Haggadah, which tells the story of Jewish enslavement in Egypt and their liberation by God through Moses. The story is considered a central part of Jewish identity.
- Pennsylvania Society Dinner – the main event of The Pennsylvania Society's annual weekend retreat
- Progressive dinner – called a progressive dinner in the U.S. and a safari supper in the U.K., it is a dinner party with successive courses prepared and eaten at the residences of different hosts. Usually this involves the consumption of one course at each location. An alternative is to have each course at a different dining area within a single large establishment.
- Reunion dinner – held on New Year's Eve of the Chinese Lunar New Year, during which family members get together to celebrate. It is often considered the most important get-together meal of the entire year.
- Réveillon – a long dinner held on the evenings preceding Christmas Day and New Year's Day. This occurs in various areas of the world.
- Rock Dinner – a series that aired on MTV Tr3s that let people in the Los Angeles area have the opportunity to cook dinner for their favorite Latino artist
- State dinner – a dinner or banquet paid for by a government and hosted by a head of state in his or her official residence in order to renew and celebrate diplomatic ties between the host country and the country of a foreign head of state or head of government who was issued an invitation. It may form part of a state visit or diplomatic conference. State lunches also occur.
  - List of U.S. State Dinners
  - State Dining Room of the White House
- Thanksgiving dinner – the centerpiece of contemporary Thanksgiving in the United States and Canada is a large meal, generally centered on a large roasted turkey which is only enjoyed once per year. The majority of the dishes in the traditional American version of Thanksgiving dinner are made from foods native to the New World, as according to tradition the Pilgrims received these food from the Native Americans.
- Thursday Dinners – meetings of artists, intellectuals, architects, politicians and statesmen held by the King of Poland, Stanisław II August in the era of Enlightenment in Poland
- Wild onion dinner – social gatherings held in the spring by various Native American tribes in Oklahoma, especially southeastern tribes. The meals focus on the spring appearance of wild onion, a food that was familiar to most of the tribes east of the Mississippi.
Dinners

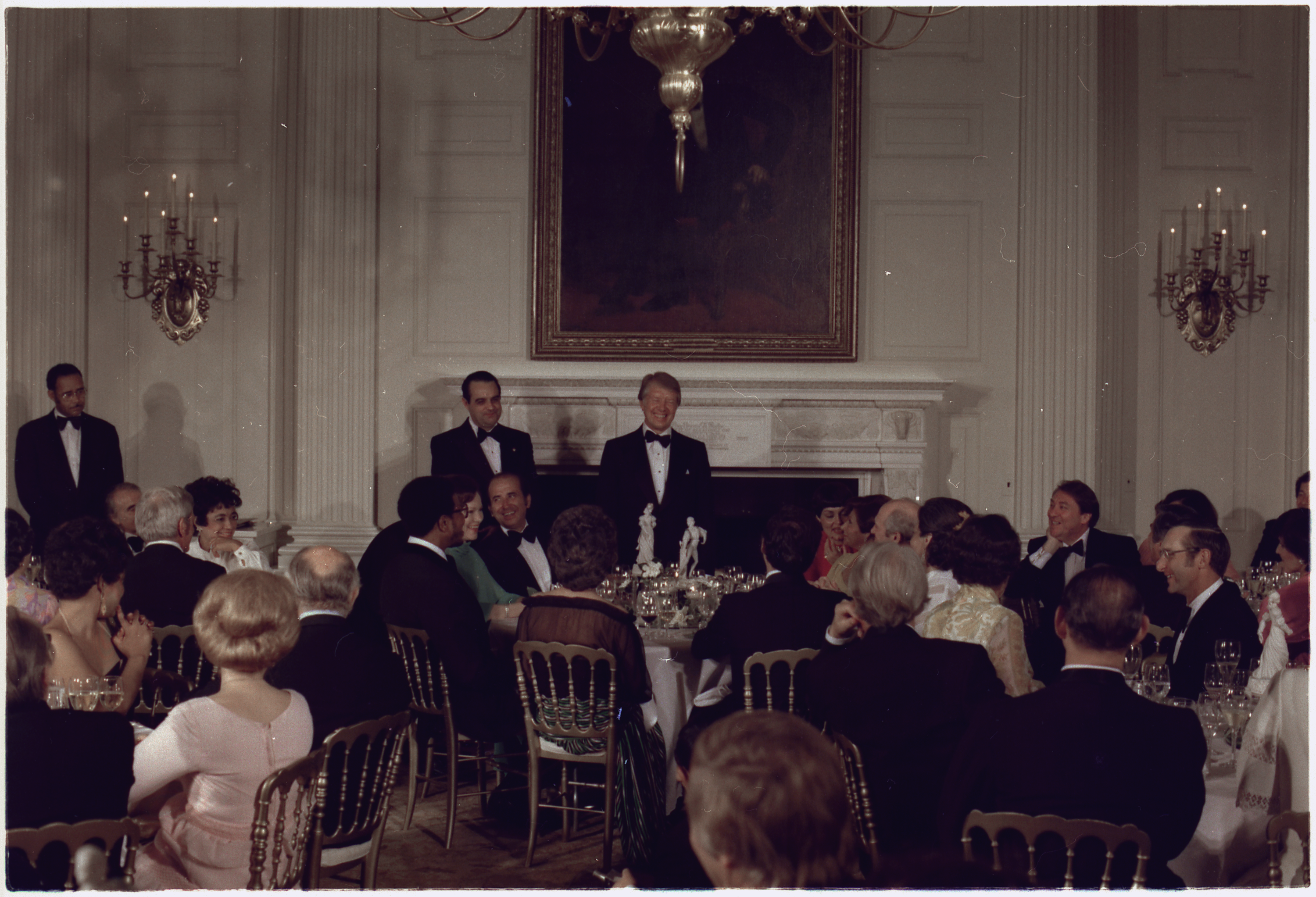
Jimmy Carter toasts Carlos Andres Perez, the President of Venezuela, during a state dinner.

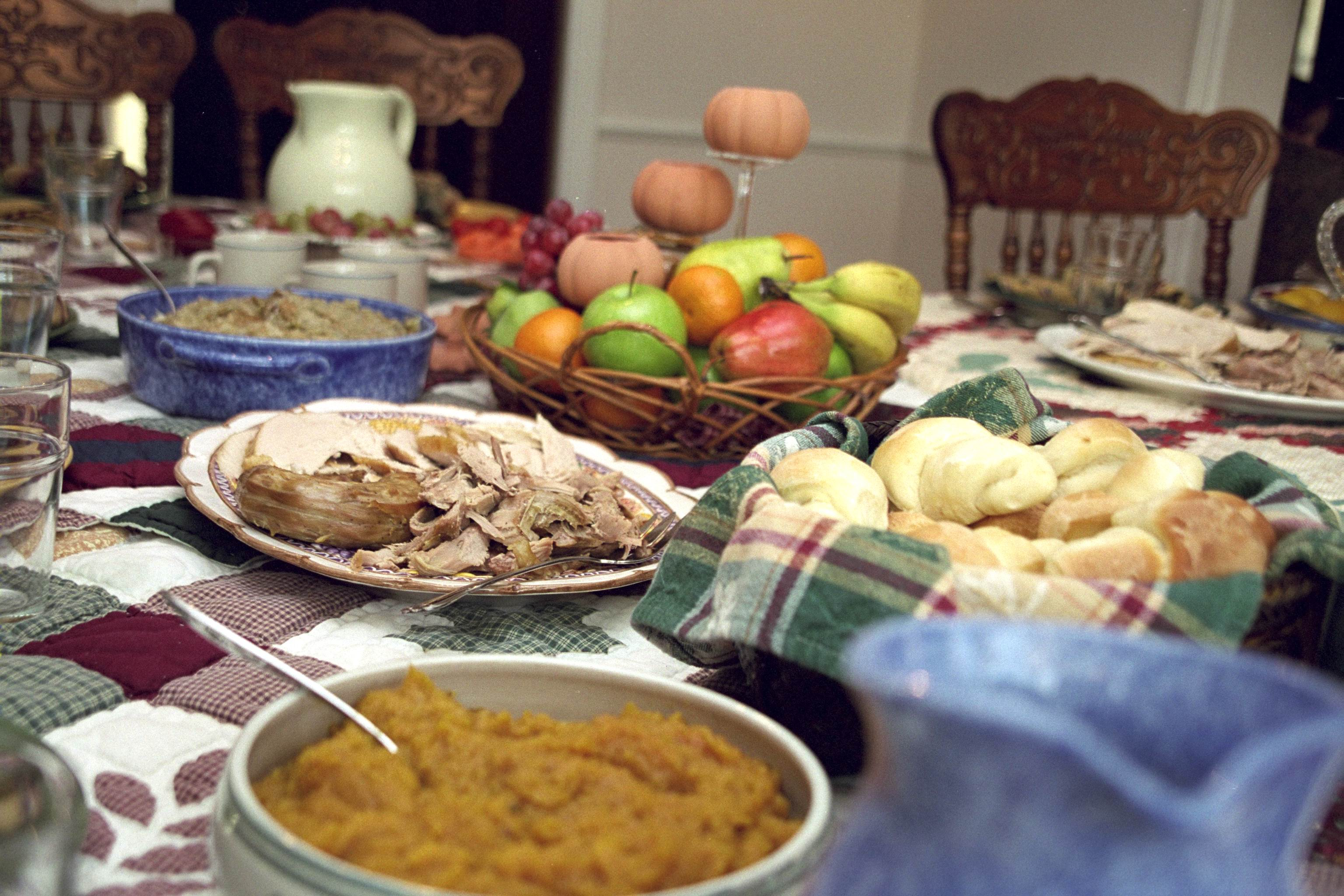
Foods at a Thanksgiving dinner

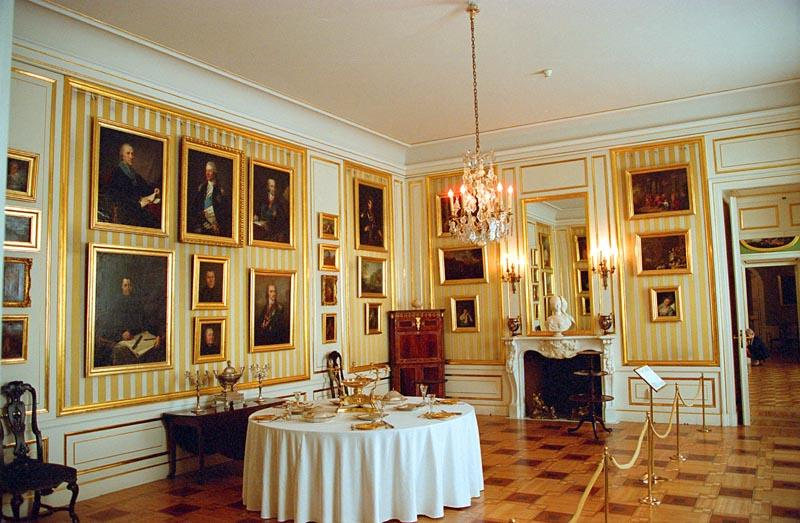
The chamber where the dignitaries would dine and meet with King Stanisław August Poniatowski at Thursday Dinners

=== The White House ===
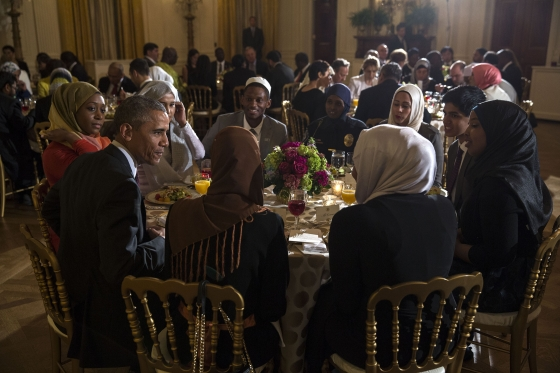
President Barack Obama hosting the White House Iftar dinner celebrating Ramadan in the East Room of the White House in 2015

- White House Correspondents' Dinner – first occurring in 1921, it has become a Washington, D.C. tradition and is traditionally attended by the president and vice president. Fifteen presidents have attended at least one White House Correspondents' Association dinner, beginning with Calvin Coolidge in 1924. The dinner is traditionally held on the evening of the last Saturday in April at the Washington Hilton.
- White House Iftar dinner – an annual reception held at the White House and hosted by the U.S. President and the First Lady to celebrate the Muslim month of Ramadan. Discontinued in 2017 and then reestablished at the White House in 2018.

== Feasts ==
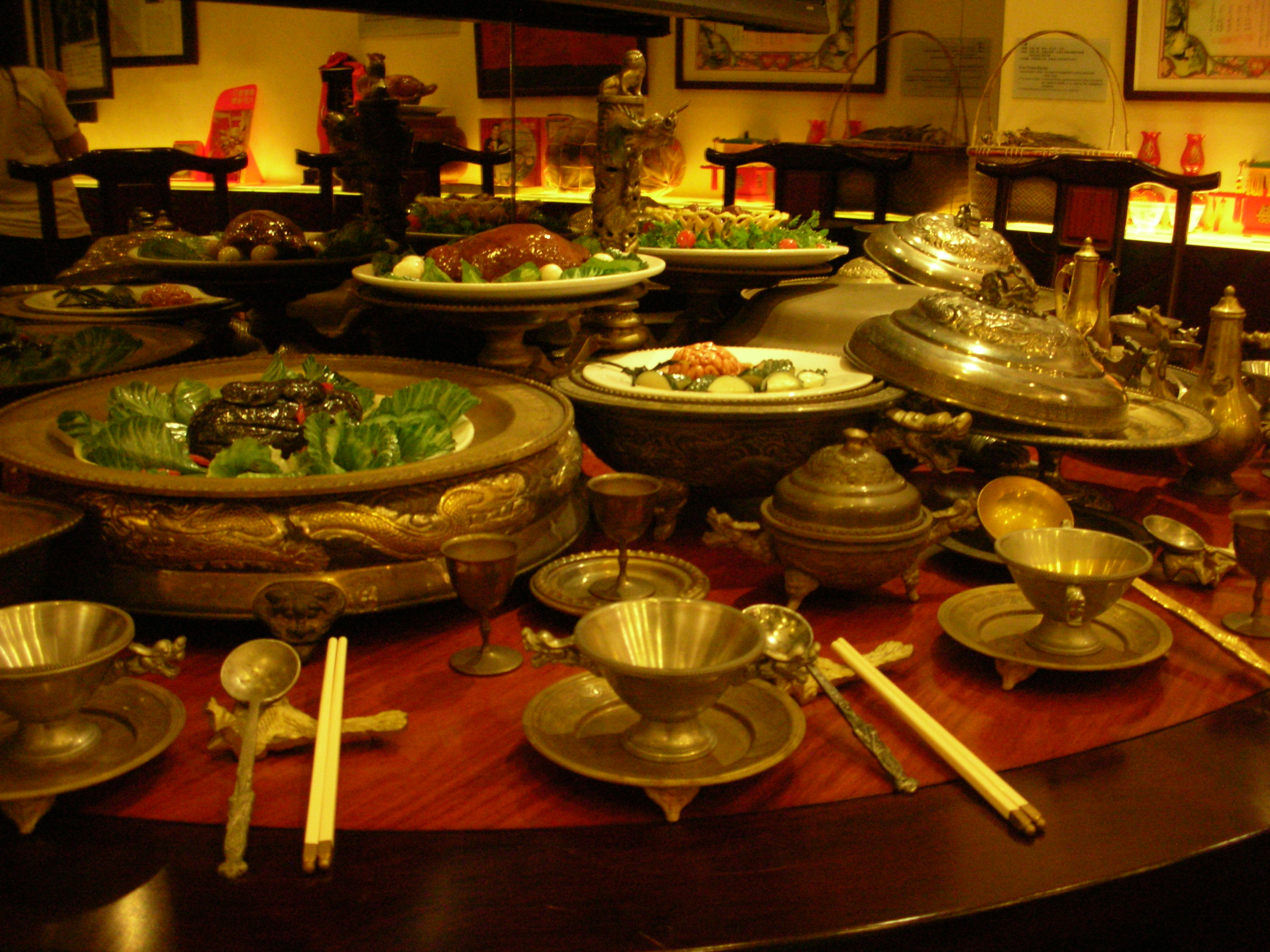
A simulation of the Manchu Han Imperial Feast, located at the Tao Heung Foods of Mankind Museum

- Bean-feast – was primarily an annual dinner given by an employer to his or her employees. By extension, colloquially, it describes any festive occasion with a meal and an outing.
- Boar's Head Feast – a festival of the Christmas season
- Commercium – a traditional academic feast known at universities in most Central and Northern European countries
- Feast of the Seven Fishes – an Italian-American celebration of Christmas Eve with meals of fish and other seafood.
- Karamu – a feast that takes place on December 31, the sixth day of the Kwanzaa period
- Manchu Han Imperial Feast – one of the grandest meals ever documented in Chinese cuisine, it consisted of at least 108 unique dishes from the Manchu and Han Chinese culture during the Qing dynasty, and it was only reserved and intended for the Emperors. The meal was held for three whole days, across six banquets. The culinary skills consisted of cooking methods from all over Imperial China.
- Mesoamerican feasts – Feasts in Mesoamerica served as settings for social and political negotiations. Wealthy or royal families hosted feasts for the purpose of gaining loyalty and a strong image that would help them politically or socially in the future. People of every social status hosted feasts as a celebration of family and life.
- Oyster Feast – the centrepiece of the annual civic calendar in the ancient borough of Colchester located in Essex in the East of England.
- Supra – a traditional Georgian feast and an important part of Georgian social culture. There are two types of supra: a festive supra called a keipi and a sombre supra called a kelekhi, that is always held after burials.
- Tableround – a traditional academic feast known at universities in most Middle and Eastern European countries. At a tableround, tables usually are placed in the form of a U or a W, the participants drink beer and sing commercium songs. A more formal form of the tableround is the commercium.

== Suppers ==
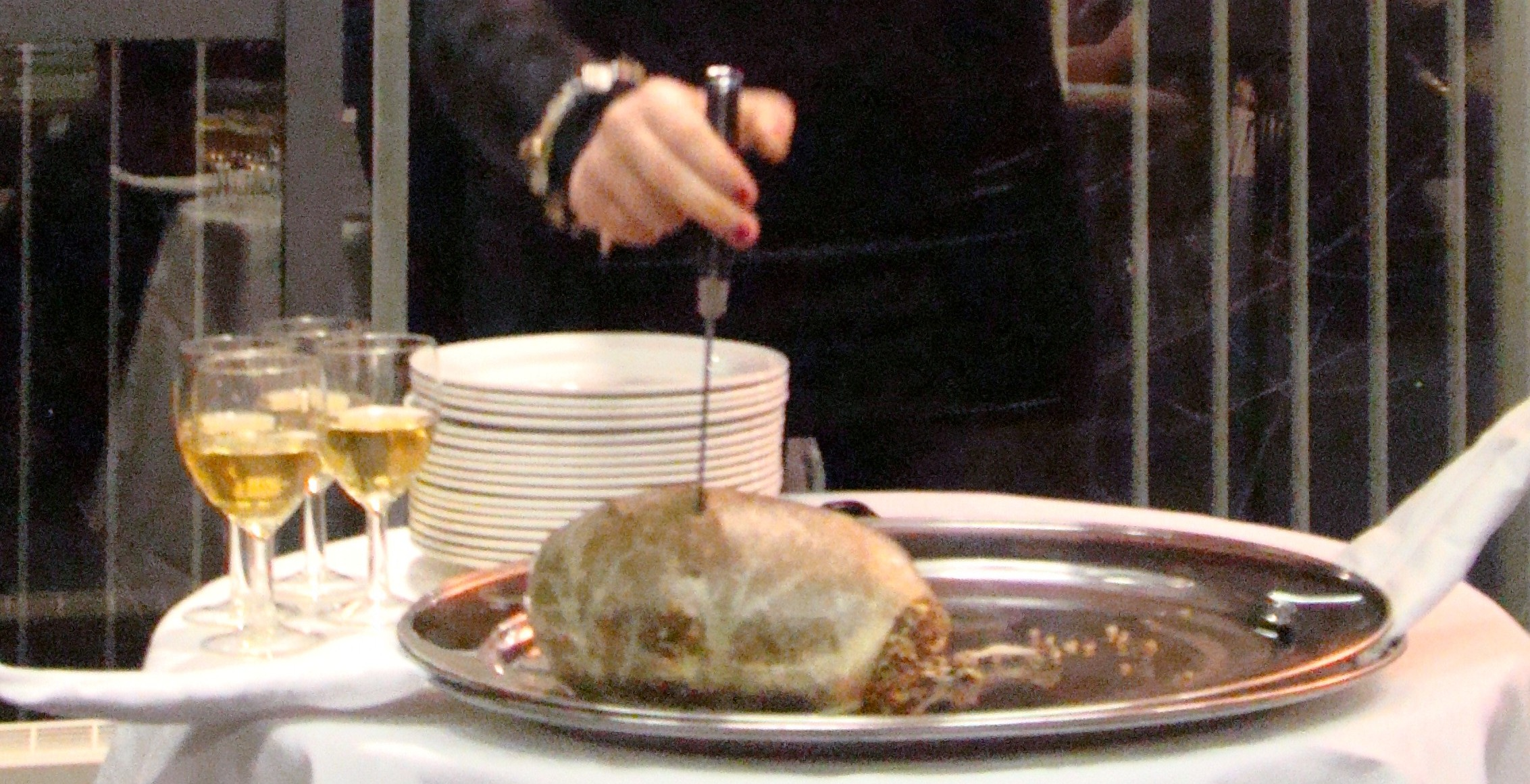
Haggis at a Burns supper

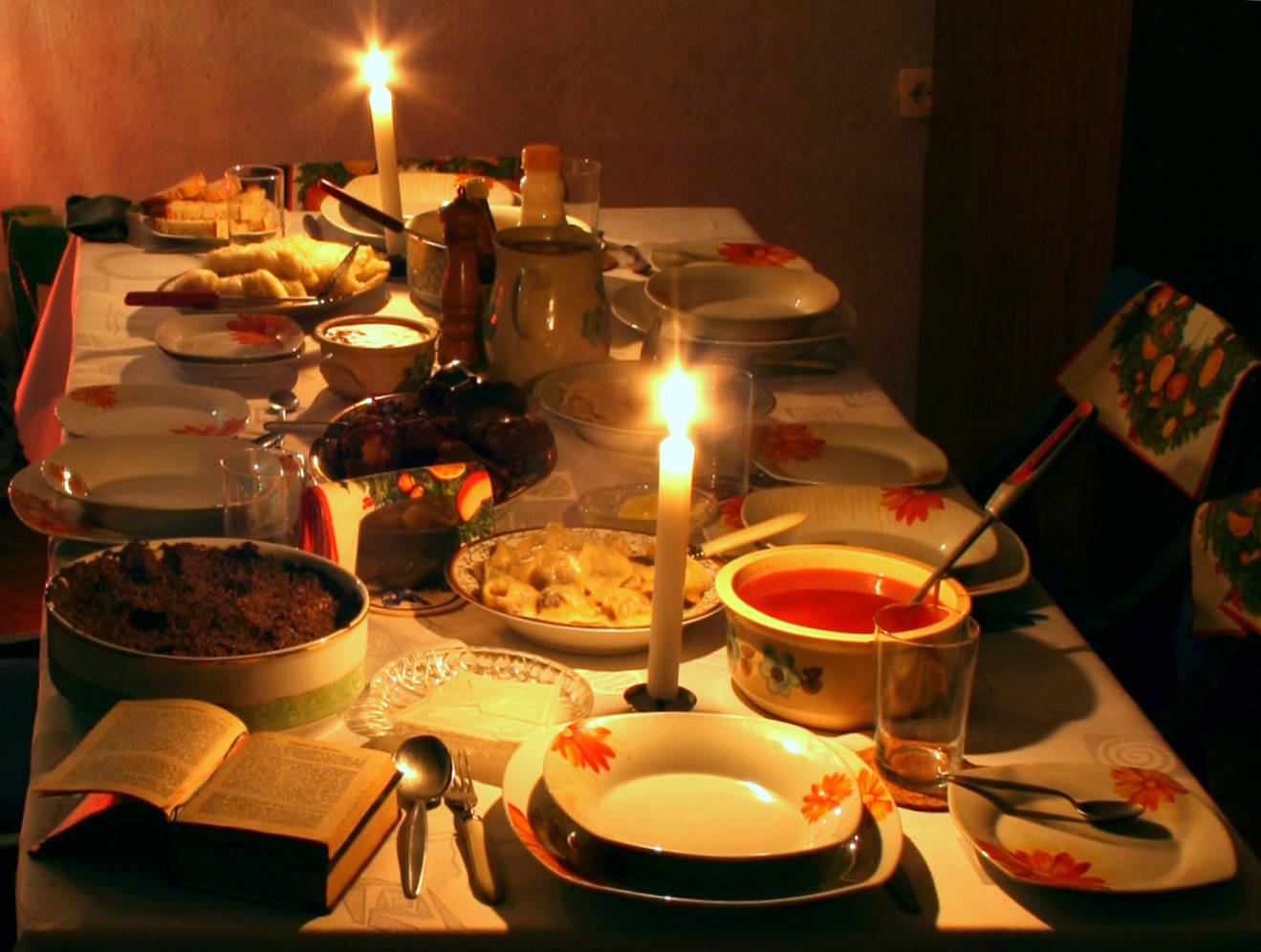
A traditional Wigilia Christmas Eve supper

- Burns supper – a celebration of the life and poetry of the poet Robert Burns, the author of many Scots poems. The suppers are normally held on or near the poet's birthday, 25 January. However, in principle, they may be held at any other time of the year.
- Pie supper – is a social gathering where pies are auctioned to raise money, often for a local school or fire department.
- Wigilia – the traditional Christmas Eve vigil supper in Poland, held on December 24

== See also ==
- Banqueting house
- Campagne des banquets
- Champagne breakfast
- Dining room
- Dinner dress
- Eating club
- Food festival
- Food history
- Last Supper in Christian art
- Pampa mesa
- Potluck
- Supper club
- Tabagie (feast)
