= Progressive dinner =

Dinner party prepared and eaten at different residences

A progressive dinner or, more recently, safari supper, is a dinner party with successive courses prepared and eaten at the residences of different hosts. Usually this involves the consumption of one course at each location. Involving travel, it is a variant on a potluck dinner and is sometimes known as a round-robin.

An alternative is to have each course at a different dining area within a single large establishment.

== Safari supper ==
In a safari supper, the destination of the next course is generally unknown by the participants, and they have to decipher a clue before moving on. Participants go to each house for the various courses. Often there is a regional theme for each dinner, such as Italian, German, or French. Various wines to suit the courses are often served at each location.

A challenge is keeping the food warm and ready at each location. An alternative is to have the courses at different restaurants. This style of eating has recently become popular as a charity fundraiser in rural Britain and is seen as a good way of meeting different neighbors in the community by virtue of each participant having separate guests.

=== Safari supper (dish) ===
No doubt inspired by the Safari Supper children's TV dinner released in the US by Libby's in 1970, containing fried chicken, alphabet spaghetti, meatballs and tomato sauce, corn and potatoes, chocolate pudding, and chocolate milk flavouring, the term "safari supper" can also be used to describe a type of baked curry consisting of ground beef and rice in a spicy-sweet sauce.(Safari supper)

== History ==
The first type of gathering to be called a progressive dinner was a couples mixing event held at a single location. It was popularized by a wave of syndicated newspaper items published throughout the American Midwest in the late 1880s. The items typically referred to it as already popular and originating in "the east," citing as inspiration the progressive form of the card game euchre, itself created a few years before. The precise origin of having dinner guests go from house to house between courses is obscure but it appears to have emerged in California in 1895. By mid-1897 the dinners had become associated with the exploding popularity of bicycling. Invitations requested that guests bring their "wheel" in order to ride between venues. A typical news item was headlined "Bicycle Dinners a New Fad." Their popularity was fanned by newspaper articles syndicated widely in both the U.S. and Australia. At the end of the century the progressive dinner was an established activity in upper class social circles though the procedure continued to be described in detail for the uninitiated.

== References in literature ==
- The Safari Party: A Comedy (2002), a play in three acts by Tim Firth.

== See also ==
- List of dining events
