= Banquet =

Large meal or feast

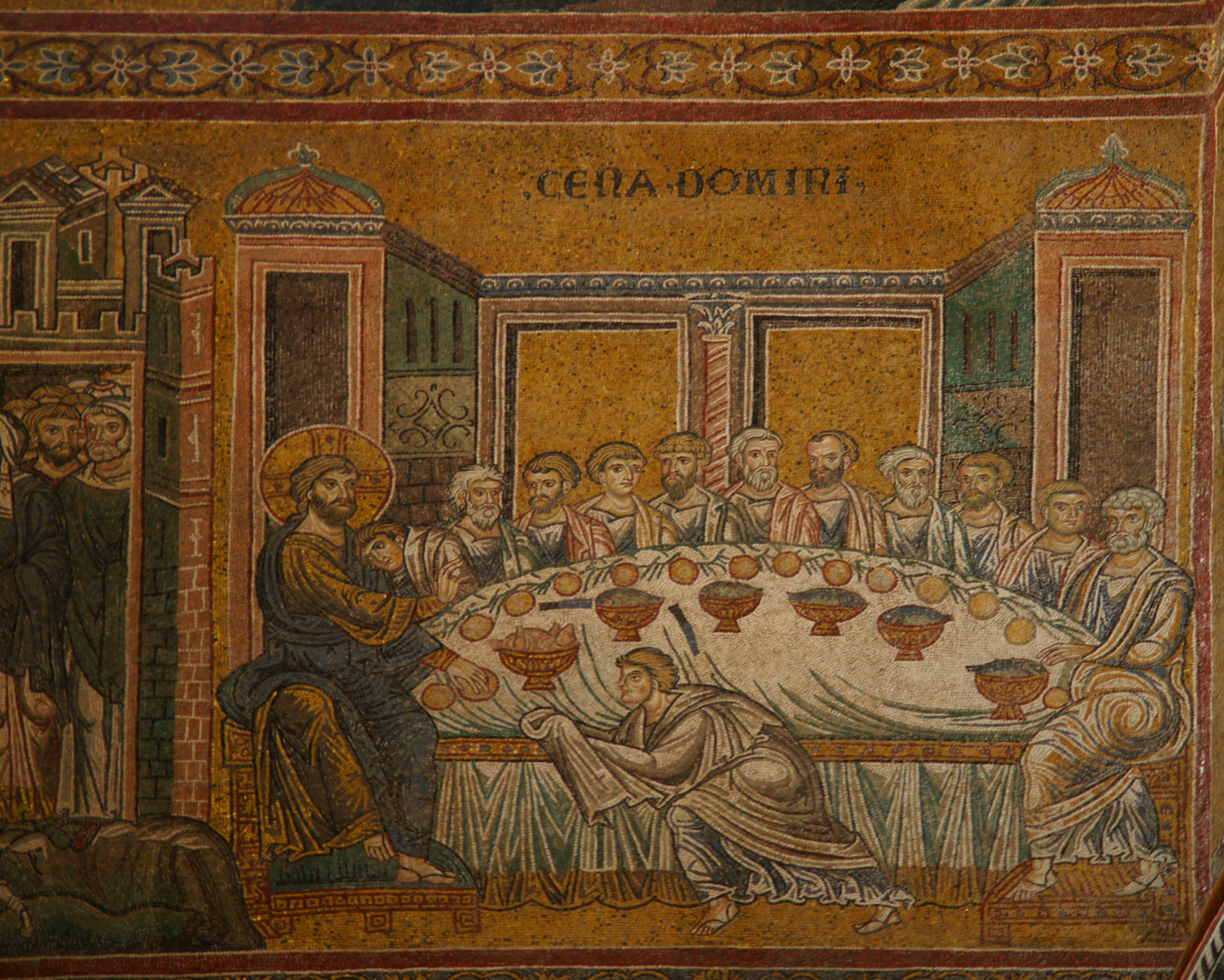
Mosaic of the Last Supper in Monreale Cathedral

A banquet (/ˈbæŋkwɪt/; French: [bɑ̃kɛ]) is a formal dining party where a large number of people consume food together. Banquets are traditionally held to enhance the prestige of a host, or reinforce social bonds among joint contributors. Modern examples of these purposes include a charitable gathering, a ceremony, a festival or other celebratory events. They often involve speeches in honor of the topic or guest of honour.

The older English term for a lavish meal was feast, and "banquet" originally meant a specific and different kind of meal, often an additional course following a feast, but in a different room or even building, which concentrated on sweet foods of various kinds. These became highly fashionable as sugar became much more common in Europe at the start of the 16th century. It was a grand form of the dessert course, and special banqueting houses, often on the roof or in the grounds of large houses, were built for them. Such meals are also called a "sugar collation".

== Social meanings ==
Banquets feature luxury foods, often including animal meat. Feasts can be divided into two fundamental types: solidarity (or alliance, or empowering) and promotional (or aggrandize, competitive, or diacritical). Solidarity feasts are a joint effort in which families or communities bring equivalent contributions together to reinforce the social ties of all concerned. Promotional feasts are intended to enhance the social status of the host, who provides the food to create obligations to themselves among the guests. Feasting is related to the control of food production and often is seen as a medium for social interaction, serving as both a way to create prestige for the host and to create commonality within a community through the sharing of food.

== Historical examples ==
The earliest archaeological evidence of feasting is at the Natufian site of Hilazon Tachtit Cave, where evidence suggests a feast was conducted at an elderly woman's burial about 12,000 years ago.

Communal feasting is evidenced from the early Neolithic in Britain. In Ancient Greece, symposia formed a routine part of life, involving the celebratory drinking of wine, conversation and performances of poetry and music.

Notable historical and legendary examples of banquets include Belshazzar's Feast, the Last Supper, the Manchu Han Imperial Feast, and mead halls.

A luau is one variety of traditional banquet originally used in Hawaii.

Many cultures have developed structures for banquets. In the European Middle Ages, comprehensive ritualised elements were involved in a traditional three-course menu, having up to 25 dishes in each course (this structure persisted into the 19th century). The structure was later altered to two courses, with the pre-existing third course changed to the serving of fruit and nuts.

Banqueting rooms varied greatly by location, but tended to be in intimate spaces, such as garden rooms, banquet halls or the small banqueting turrets in Longleat House.

Art historians have often noted that banqueters on iconographic records of ancient Mediterranean societies almost always appear to be lying down on their left sides. One possible explanation could lie in the anatomy of the stomach and in the digestive mechanism. When lying on the left, the food has room to expand because the curvature of the stomach is enhanced in that position.

== Contemporary examples ==
Contemporary banquets serve many new purposes in addition to their traditional purposes. These can include anything from during workplace training sessions and formal business dinners to birthday parties and social gatherings. It is common for a banquet to be organized at the end of academic conferences.

== Government intervention ==
The State Council of the People's Republic of China levied a tax on banquets on September 2, 1988, at a tax rate calculated per occasion between 15% and 20% of the banquet's value.

== Banquets held over time ==
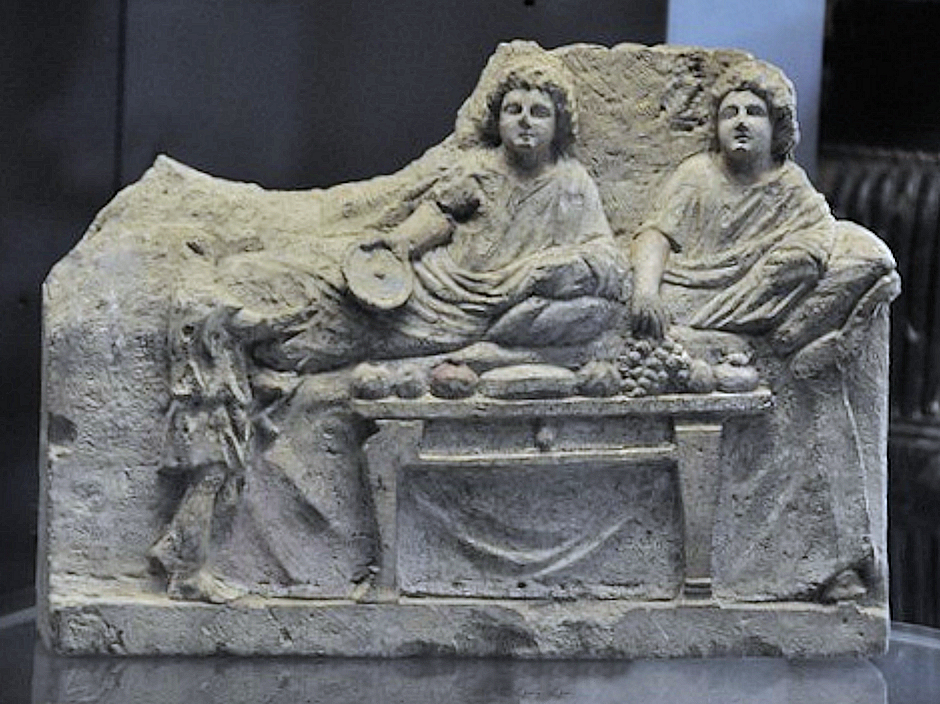
Hellenistic banquet scene

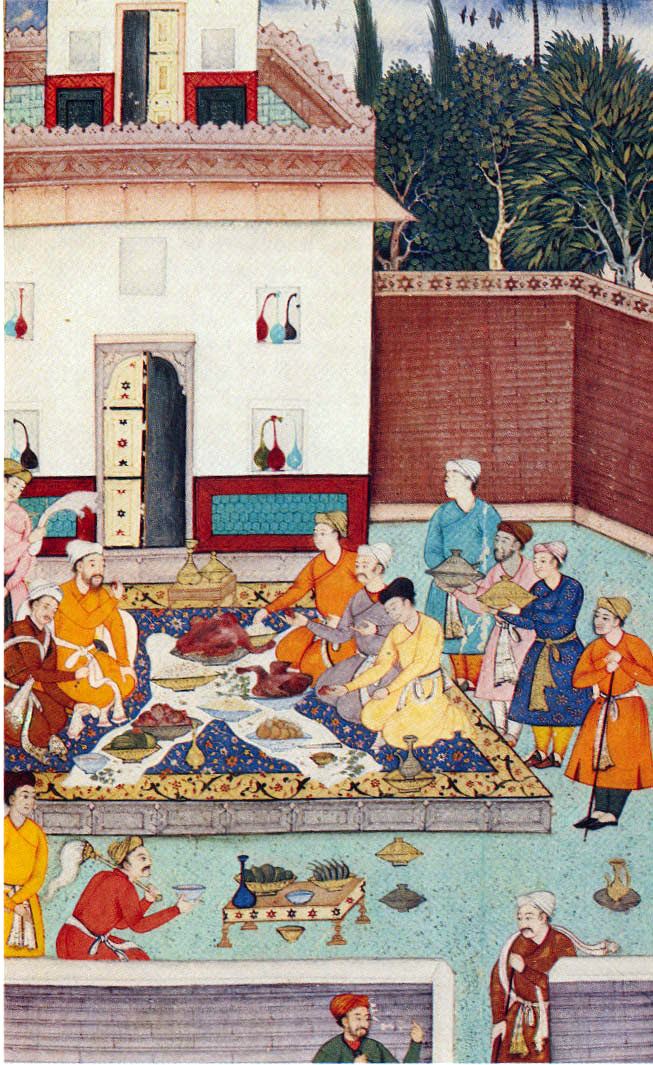
A banquet for Babur

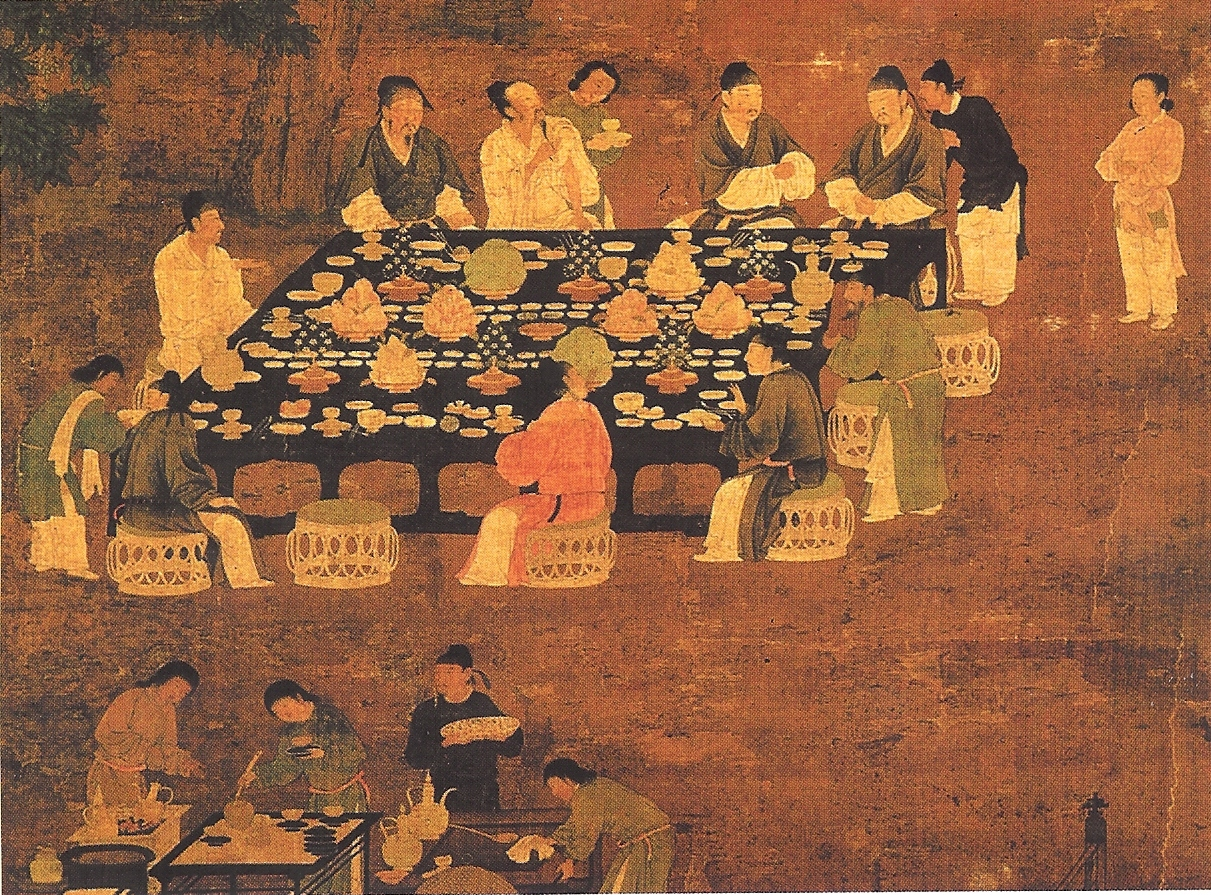
A Chinese painting of an outdoor banquet, from the era of the Song dynasty (960–1279)

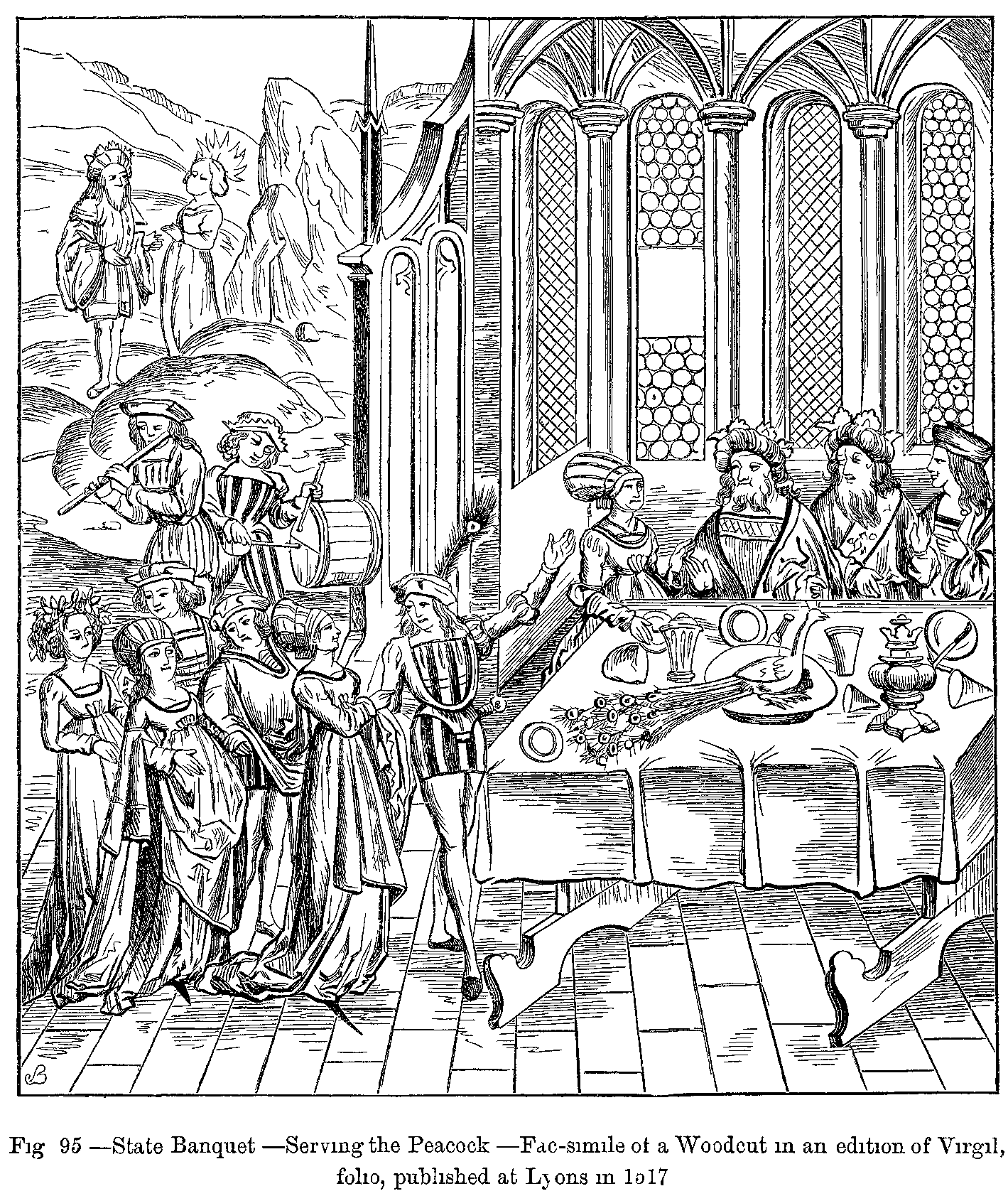
State Banquet. Serving the Peacock. Facsimile of a woodcut in an edition of Virgil, folio, published at Lyons in 1517.

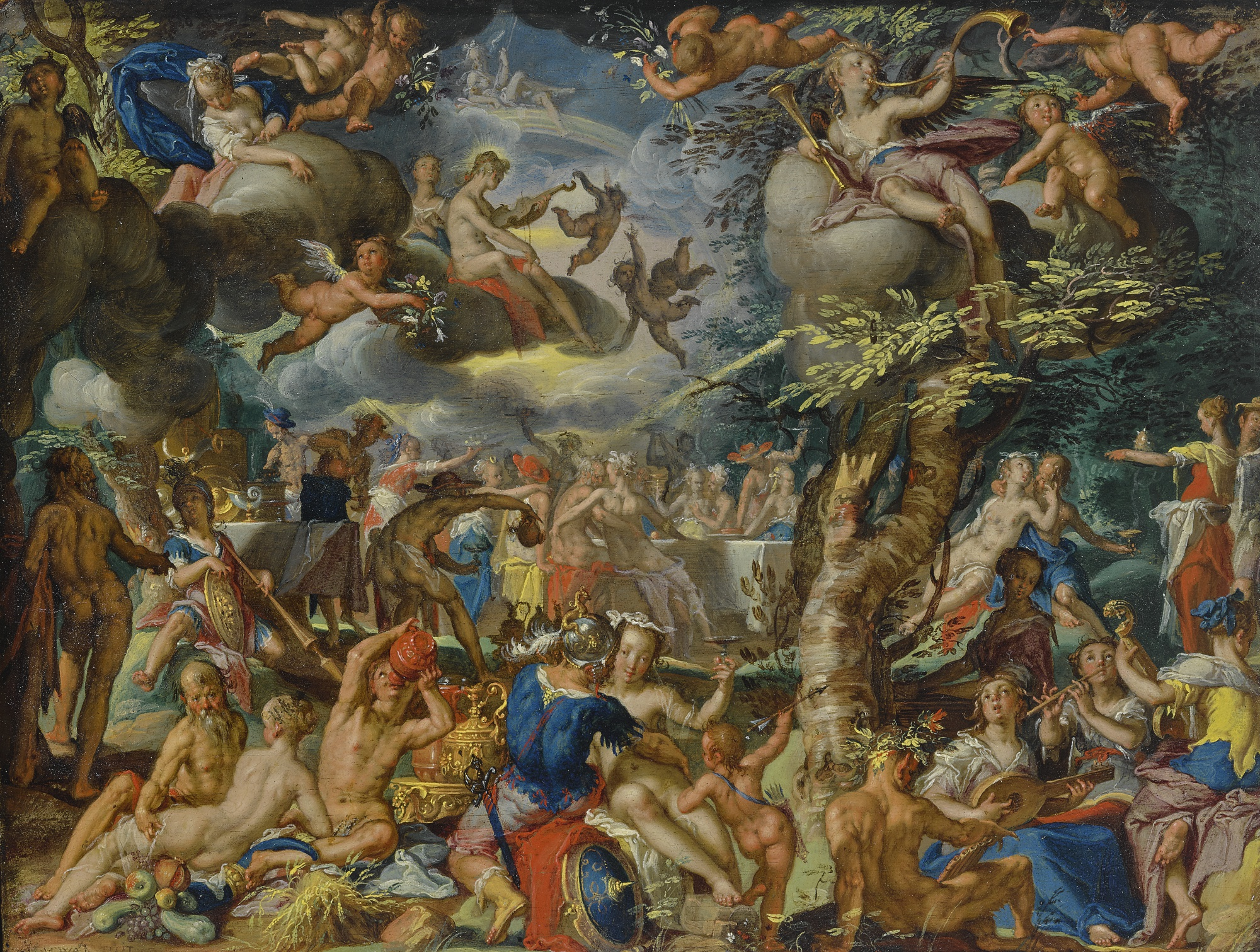
Joachim Wtewael: Banquet of the Gods, around 1602

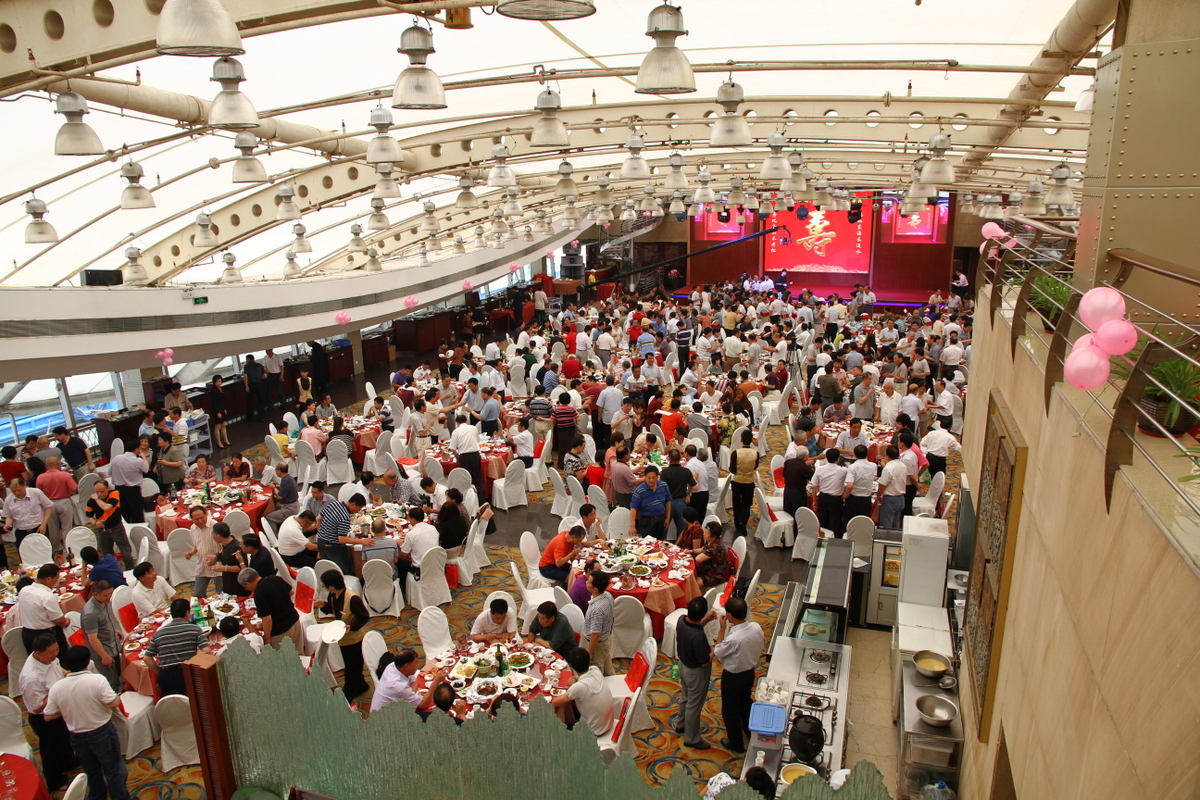
Chinese banquet for a birthday celebration

== See also ==
- Assembly hall
- Beefsteak (banquet)
- List of dining events
- Party
