= Mesoamerican feasts =

Feasts in Mesoamerica served as settings for social and political negotiations. Wealthy or royal families hosted feasts for the purpose of gaining loyalty and a strong image that would help them politically or socially in the future. People of every social status hosted feasts as a celebration of family and life.

There were two main types of feasts, as discussed by Lisa J. LeCount and suggested by Dietler, diacritical exclusionary events and inclusionary events. Diacritical feasts were hosted by the wealthy and powerful, with only a strict list of other elite guests. These feasts were to demonstrate differences in social status and ensure that other members of society knew who had the power. This is evident with royals, politicians and the elite gaining loyalty through hosting feasts or performing rituals. Inclusionary feasts were held to promote solidarity and equality among the entire community. The invitation list for these feasts was broader and the event was larger and in a public setting. Inclusionary feasts were celebrations by the community as a whole. The cuisine for inclusionary feasts was similar to that of daily meals, whereas for diacritical feasts the cuisine was higher end and meant to impress the guests. Feasts differed slightly throughout eras and various societies in Mesoamerica.

== Maya society ==
Feasts in Maya society were composed of three parts: 1) worshiping of an ancestor by presenting offerings, 2) the sacrificing of the offerings, and 3) the consumption of foods that were blessed by the gods. The Maya hosted feasts for various reasons such as to celebrate marriages, deaths, health, various life events, farming celebrations, and holidays. Studies of the Late Classic Maya demonstrate a connection between feasting and politics. Maya feasting seems to have been very competitive among elites and royals who were trying to gain political loyalty by hosting the most extravagant feast with lavish foods and items. Ethnographic and ethnohistoric data shows that Late Classic Maya feasts were segmented into two corresponding parts: a private religious part and then a public festival. The private religious section was focused on gods, family, and ancestor worship while the public festival was often political or social. Rain ceremonies are an example of the segmented feasts that the Maya hosted.

=== Public feasting ===
Public feasting in Late Classic Maya society included the community as a whole, but still celebrated the elites and royals. Sixteenth Century Yucatec Maya display evidence of public feasting for two occasions. They celebrated marriages or ancestors with feasts, but also hosted a feast simply for building and maintaining relationships, which required all guests of the feast to then host their own feast in the near future. Feasts of the Yucatec seemed to have occurred on every social level and all heads of the families had to host feasts at times of rites of passages for their family members in order to maintain the social honor and status of their family. The men plan the feast while the women prepare foods with their other female family members. Each family makes much food to create a giant festival for the community which often include markets, bullfights, fireworks, dancing, and obviously drinking and eating.

==== Rain ceremonies ====
Rain ceremonies are an example of the feasts that the Modern Yucatec Maya host and they demonstrate both the religious and the public parts of feasts. The ceremony takes three days to complete all the ritual activities, with the first two days being confined to a small number of the community members. On the last day of the ritual the public is involved. On the first day, members of the community who ritual specialists construct an altar near the plaza where the ceremony will take place. On day two sacred food is offered to the gods at dawn, noon, three, seven and twice more sometime before two in the morning. Once those sacrifices are over, the people who participated in the ritual eat the sacrificed foods. After all of the very religious activities take place, the public festival is held and is meant to be a time for friends, family and eating.

=== Royal feasts ===
Food was a very important and central aspect of many royal events and activities. For palace sponsored feasts, cooks prepared all of the food while noblewomen supervised the kitchen staff. The Mayas had a strong belief in animatism and LeCount thinks that they may have believed that when Mayan cooks prepared the feasts with maize and ka’kaw, that they were animated by the supernatural. Elite cooking differed from commoners' cooking because of the skills and knowledge that the cooks had which allowed the meals to become sacred or symbolic.

=== Serving vessels ===
At Xunantunich, Belize, archeological evidence of food serving vessels shows a distinction between vessels used at private and public feasts. Different serving platters were found that suggest certain vessels were used to serve sacred feasting foods and others were used for daily or more public events. Elite members indulged with polychrome plates and vases and had a higher frequency of serving bowls and platters. Common household ruins show less evidence of serving bowls and vases and LeCount suggests that they may have used small gourds to offer foods to the gods.

=== Maya cuisine ===
Tamales were a main dish of daily meals as well as a common ritual food in the central Maya lowlands. Deer, turkey, dog and other meats were saved for public festivals. Sacred foods and festival foods were different to symbolize the difference between community and an individual. Foods at feasts were presented as a sacred item and sacrificed to the gods. Maize is thought to evoke rain functions of the gods and to symbolize purity and divinity which made it a good sacrificial food for the gods. Maize was also a typical festival food along with tamales, tortillas, chicken, pig, chocolate and rum. The Yucatec Maya served chocolate at their weddings and baptisms. Cacao is not served at religious events, but is often at political or social gatherings. Cacao seeds are important because they are used in the negotiation of marriages. At public ceremonies freshwater snails, jutes, were eaten. The elites tended to eat ritual foods such as tamales and chocolate more often than commoners. Modern Day Mayan officials or elite consume chocolate drinks in private rituals to form social and political relationships.

== Aztec society ==
Feasting occurred on a wide variety of social scales and contexts in Aztec society. They were held as celebrations of births, deaths, marriages or other events. The feasts included activities such as gift exchanges, human sacrifices, incense burning, speeches, plays, and of course eating and drinking. Royal and noble houses entertained and hosted feasts at scheduled times such as to distribute foods and money to the kingdom's staff and administrative workers. Both kingdoms and common households held feasts to celebrate religious events and life events of their family (Smith 2003). Aztec Codices show depictions of public-religious feasts, elite feasts hosted by the ruler, and home celebrations. Most feasts included some type of ritual activity, but there were some feasts that were more religious and ritual than others. At these ritual feasts the foods are not just offered to the gods, but are consumed at a particular time throughout the ceremony. When worshiping death gods, such as Mictlantecuhtli, human flesh is consumed around the temple of the ritual.

=== Politics ===
Feasts were a large part of political interaction of the elite because they served as a way to gain loyal allies that would back them in political competitions. The dishes and vessels that the food was served in showed the status of the elite and was very important to the power and competition of the host. Feasts held by royalty or nobles included high quality foods to emphasis their social status.

Aztec rulers hosted feasts and dances in order to bring young warriors together or to celebrate the success of a warrior. The feasts made the warriors’ job look appealing and rewarding. Only rulers of capitals that received tributes could directly reward the warriors with feasts and events, whereas rulers of those communities who had to pay tribute did not have the resources to spend on the warriors.

=== Aztec cuisine ===
Pulque, a fermented drink that is made from sap of the maguey plant was consumed often at Aztec rituals and feasts, but usually only at night. Codices also picture alcoholic drinks, tortillas, tamales and cacao. Meat stews, tamales, and maize, which was believed to be a link between the sun and people and to carry the sun’s energy, were all consumed at feasts.

=== Serving vessels ===
Food could have been served in either ceramic or stone vessels or gourds and baskets. Pulque was served in vessels that were decorated with symbols, such as half suns, skulls and cross bones, which represented night, disorder, and destruction. There were some specific pulque vessels that were only used during ceremonies or rituals, such as the "stone rabbit vessel". The rabbit vessel symbolized the relationship of the moon, rabbits, and pulque and was only used during celebrations of Ometochtli ("Two Rabbit") which was an important day of the 260-day calendar.

== See also ==
- List of dining events
