= Henry Picard (Lord Mayor) =

14th-century Lord Mayor of London

Sir Henry Picard was Lord Mayor of London in 1356 and 1357.

He was made Sheriff of the City of London in 1348 and elected Lord Mayor in 1356.

In 1363 he organised the meeting of the king of England Edward III with the kings of Scotland, France, Denmark and Cyprus.
