= Banquet of the Five Kings =

1363 meeting in London, England

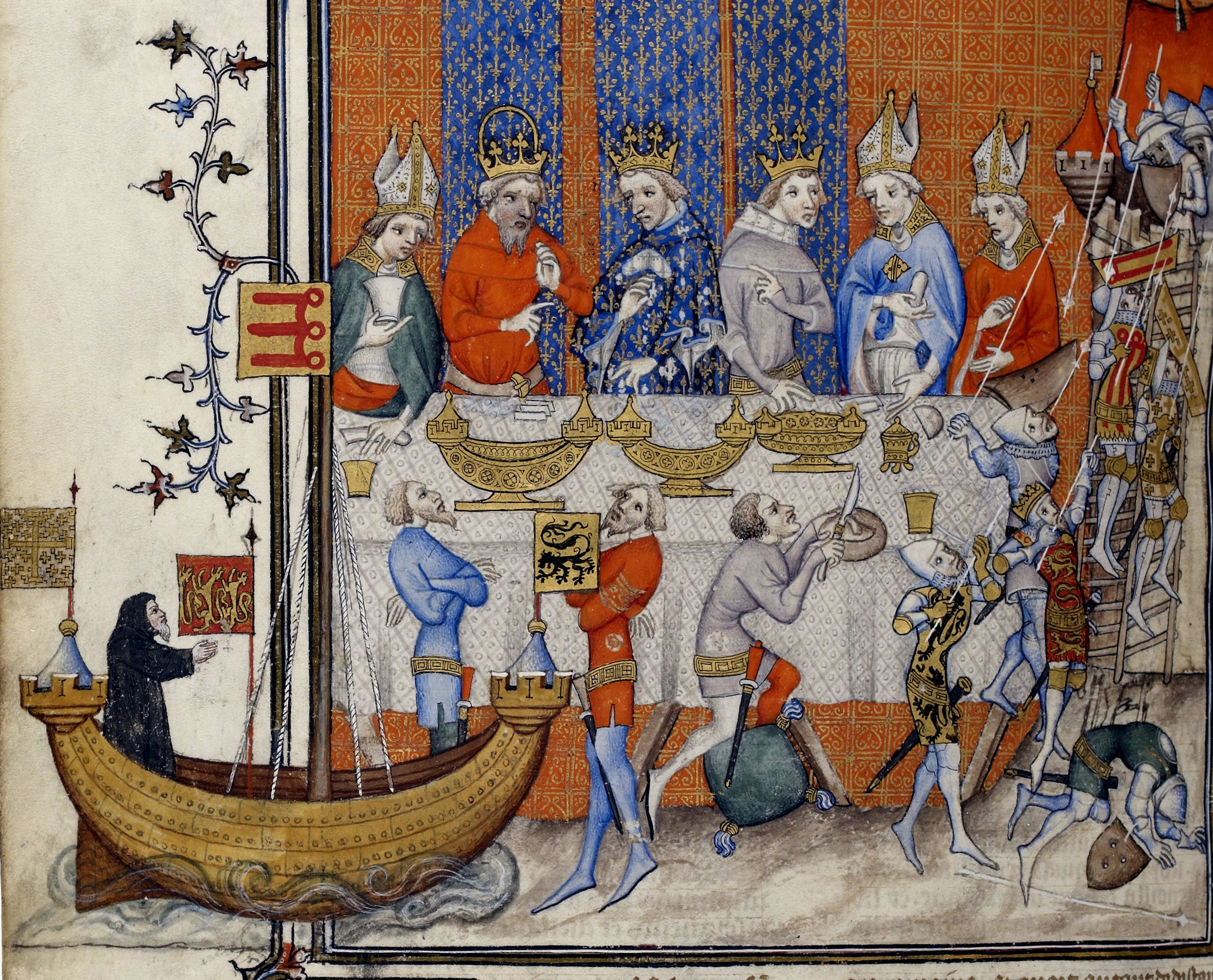
A comparable feast. Three nefs on the table as Charles V of France hosts Charles IV, Holy Roman Emperor and his son Wenceslaus IV of Bohemia in 1378. They are watching a floor-show re-enacting the taking of Jerusalem.

The Banquet of the Five Kings was a meeting, in 1363, of the kings of England, Scotland, France, Denmark and Cyprus. It was arranged by Sir Henry Picard, a former Lord Mayor of London. The five kings were:

- Peter I of Cyprus
- Edward III of England
- David II of Scotland
- John II of France
- Valdemar IV of Denmark

The occasion (the toast of the five kings) was hosted by the Vintners' Company at their hall in the City of London.

The Cypriot beverage company KEO created a brandy, produced in Limassol, to commemorate the occasion.

== See also ==
- List of dining events
