= Oyster Feast =

Food festival in Colchester, England

The Oyster Feast is the centrepiece of the annual civic calendar in the ancient borough of Colchester located in Essex in the East of England.

== The Colchester Natives ==
The Colne oyster fishery dates to the Roman era. It was mentioned in the Domesday Book. The borough of Colchester obtained rights to the fishery under the provisions of its Royal Charter granted by Richard I in 1189. The oysters obtained from the fishery are known as "Colchester Natives" (the native oyster, Ostrea edulis).

== Annual opening of the oyster fishery ==
The oyster fishery is officially "opened" on the first Friday of September each year. The Mayor of Colchester, the Town Clerk, and the Town Sergeant take passage on an oyster dredger out into the Pyefleet Channel of the Colne estuary off Mersea Island, in full civic regalia. A flotilla of small boats carrying invited guests follows the Mayor out into the channel. Oaths are sworn, pledging devotion to the monarch. The Mayor dredges and consumes the first oyster of the season. The Mayor and guests then proceed to an oyster lunch which celebrates the opening of the fishery.

== The Oyster Feast ==
On the last Friday in October each year, the Mayor of Colchester hosts a grand civic Oyster Feast in the Moot Hall. The feast is attended by civic dignitaries from around the nation, and worthies from the world of arts and entertainment. The Mayor also invites Colchester citizens who are active in local charities, civic bodies, and good causes. There is a public lottery to ensure that every citizen of the borough has the chance to attend this prestigious event.

The feast has its origins in the St Denis Fair dating to the 14th Century. The modern feast dates to 1845 when it was brought onto the civic calendar by Mayor of Colchester Thomas Wolton.

== Literature ==
- David Cannadine: The Transformation of Civic Ritual in Modern Britain: The Colchester Oyster Feast, in: Past & Present, No. 94 (Feb. 1982), pp. 107-130

== See also ==
- List of dining events
