= Beefsteak (banquet) =

Banquet with sliced beef tenderloin as all-you-can-eat finger food

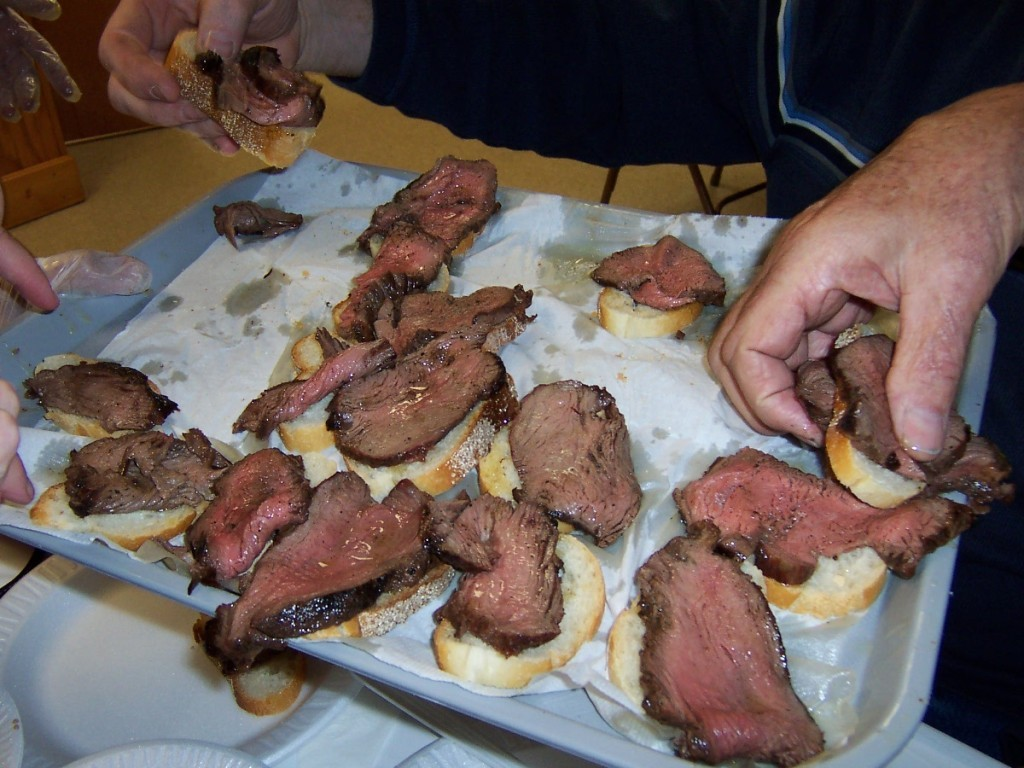
Beef being served at a beefsteak banquet

A beefsteak is a type of banquet in which sliced beef tenderloin is served to diners as all-you-can-eat finger food. The dining style originated in 19th-century New York City as a type of working-class celebration but went into a decline in the mid-20th century. Resurrected by caterers in New Jersey, the beefsteak banquet style remained popular in that state's Bergen and Passaic counties, and is enjoying a revival in New York City, where the style originated, due to the reemergence of a biannual beefsteak in Brooklyn. Similar "beef and beer fundraisers" are common in the Philadelphia region, especially in white working class communities.

== Origins ==
Beefsteak banquets originated among the working class of New York City in the mid-19th century as celebratory meals or "testimonials". The meal would generally be set up by an organization wishing to laud or raise money for politicians, newly promoted friends, or celebrities. Tammany Hall regularly threw beefsteaks as political fundraisers, often enough that it was a large portion of beefsteak business in New York and "when Tammany Hall [got] a setback, beefsteaks [got] a setback". Sophie Tucker and Bill Robinson had beefsteaks thrown for them in the 1930s.

Early beefsteaks were held in a relaxed, men-only atmosphere, with diners sitting on crates and eating with their fingers off of rough, improvised tables in saloons, rental halls, or residential basements. Food and drink were the focus of the evening, and entertainment often consisted simply of those present telling stories and singing amongst themselves. Brass bands were sometimes hired.

=== Early organization ===
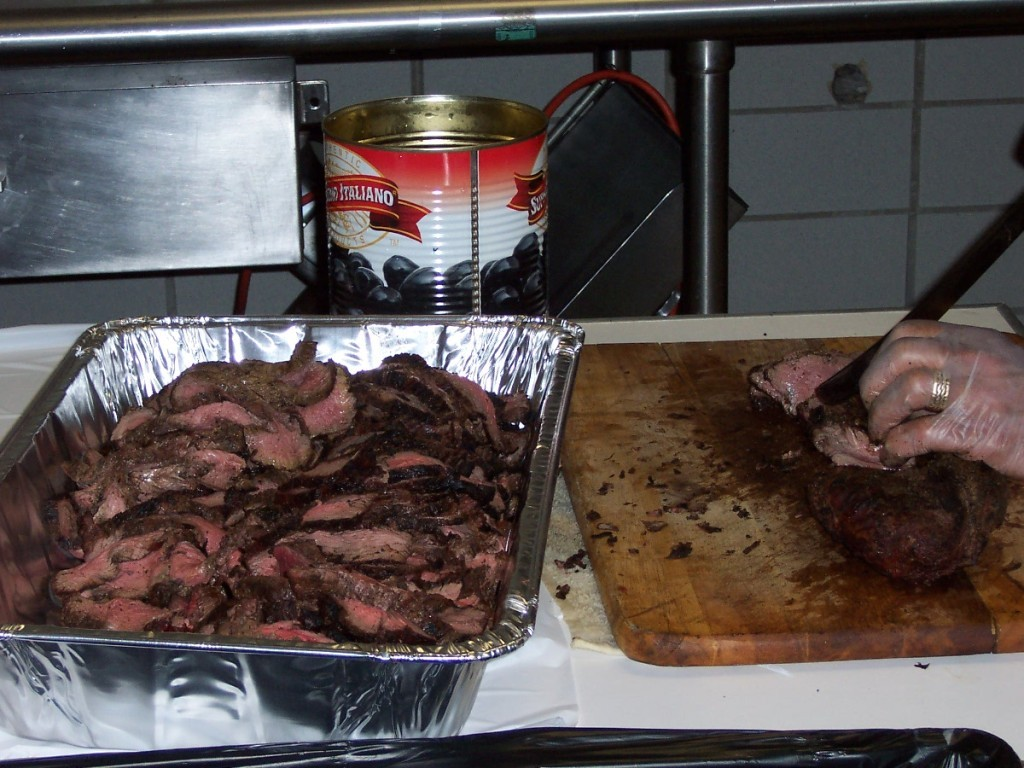
Beef tenderloin being sliced

Though the centerpiece of beefsteak culture was indisputably the frenzied consumption of beef and beer, with diners eating with their fingers and drinking with abandon, serving styles varied. 1930s-era beefsteaks could be grouped into two styles, referred to by Joseph Mitchell in a 1939 The New Yorker article as "East Side" and "West Side" and roughly corresponding to the geographic separation of New York City into the same-named areas. Each group claimed to Mitchell to have originated beefsteak banquets and to have the most authentic serving and eating styles.

"East Side" beefsteaks were largely patronized by the working-class and immigrants, and the center of the East Side beefsteak world was at First Avenue and Nineteenth Street in Manhattan. East Side beefsteaks were heavily meat-centered, with courses consisting of items like sliced beef short loin, beef kidneys, and ground beef trimmings (referred to as "hamburgers"). One East Side beefsteak was reported to have consisted of "3,000 pounds (1,400 kg) of steak, 1,500 pounds (680 kg) of lamb chops, 425 pounds (193 kg) of hamburger and 1,300 pounds (590 kg) of kidneys wrapped with bacon."

"West Side" beefsteaks, on the other hand, were often thrown at "gentlemen-only" establishments centered on Eleventh Avenue and 23rd Street. West Side beefsteaks tended more toward expansive menus, with courses including crab meat, lamb chops, and baked potatoes to go along with the beef loin. Diners at West Side beefsteaks were allowed to use disposable forks for some courses, but were expected to eat the beef course with their fingers.

=== Dining style ===
Both schools of thought in New York agreed that eating with one's fingers and not being afraid to get messy were integral to the culture of the beefsteak. No matter which type of beefsteak a diner attended, the main course was beef loin dipped in butter-based sauce and served thinly sliced on rounds of bread (day-old bread, at East Side beefsteaks; fresh toast, at West Side). Napkins were considered unnecessary; diners generally wore aprons with which they could wipe the grease off their hands. Food was dispatched from the kitchen laid out on trays and waiters continued bringing out trays until diners could literally eat no more (In his New Yorker article, Joseph Mitchell quotes one man as saying, "I'm so full I'm about to pop. Push those kidneys a little nearer, if you don't mind."). Beer flowed freely during banquets in pre-prohibition years.

== Evolution ==
With the passing of the 18th and 19th amendments to the U.S. Constitution, in 1919 and 1920, respectively, the traditional men-only, beer-soaked format of the beefsteak began to change. Politicians began including newly enfranchised women voters in their beefsteak banquets after the passage of the Nineteenth Amendment, and with the attendance of women came corresponding social niceties. Cocktails, popularized by illicit drinkers during Prohibition, replaced pitchers of beer, and "fruit cups ... and fancy salads" were soon added to beefsteak menus. Orchestras were hired in place of old-fashioned brass bands and storytellers, and the long-forbidden knives and forks began to appear on beefsteak tables. By the 1930s, according to Joseph Mitchell, beefsteaks were no longer the manly, messy affairs they had once been; they were now closer to formal meals in which beef and bread happened to feature heavily. The cheerful gluttony of the past was tempered by female sensibilities; "women," Mitchell reported, "do not esteem a glutton, and at a contemporary beefsteak it is unusual for a man to do away with more than three pounds of meat and twenty-five glasses of beer."

In 1938, "Hap" Nightingale, a butcher in Clifton, New Jersey, began catering parties in his area according to the old-time beefsteak formula. He offered a set, all-you-can-eat menu of French fries and sliced beef tenderloin on bread. His business thrived locally, and the company has since been passed down through ensuing generations of Nightingales, all of whom continued to adhere to the tried-and-true formula.

== Current practice ==
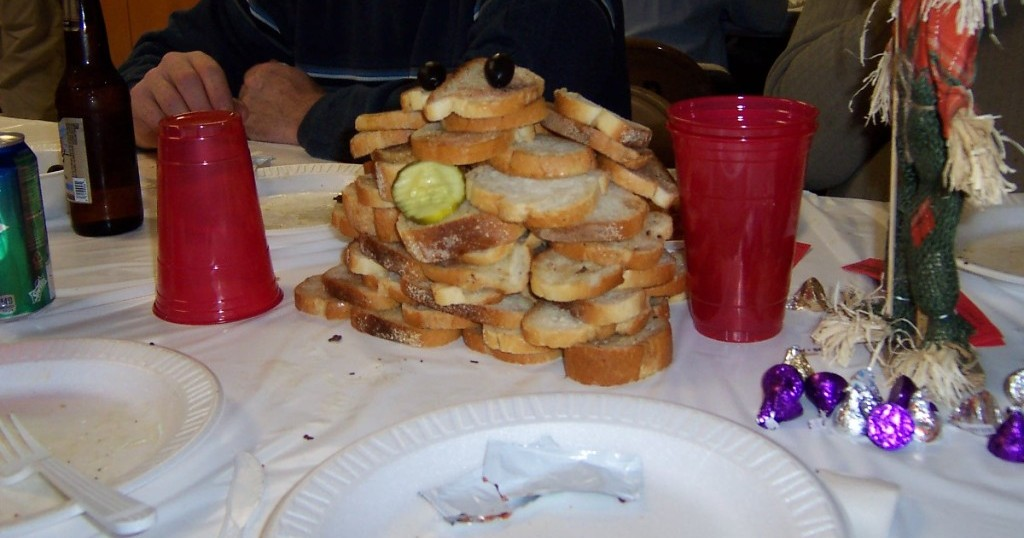
Two diners' bread piled to "keep count" at a beefsteak

The modern beefsteak banquet hews fairly closely to the early-1900s model, although the expansive selections found at an old-fashioned "West Side" beefsteak have been tapered down to beef, fried potatoes, and tossed salad. Butter is sometimes replaced by margarine, and a pasta course makes an occasional appearance, but attendees at beefsteaks still expect to be fed mostly abundant quantities of beef tenderloin. Modern beefsteak attendees often follow an unspoken protocol to leave their bread slices uneaten. Piling them up in front of one's plate instead of consuming them "saves valuable stomach capacity for more beef while simultaneously serving as an informal scorekeeping system".

== Modern distribution ==
Beefsteak banquets have largely vanished from New York City, where they originated, but remain widespread in Bergen and Passaic counties in New Jersey. The institution is now almost entirely limited to these areas, save for a popular biannual beefsteak held in Brooklyn; while residents of Bergen and Passaic counties consider them an ingrained part of regional culture and regularly stage beefsteak fundraisers (caterers interviewed in a New York Times article stated that they "put on about 1,000 of them in the region [in 2007]"), across the county line in Essex County, for example, they remain nearly unheard of.

Regis High School and Xavier High School (Jesuit schools on the Upper East Side and in Chelsea respectively) each host an annual traditional beefsteak for alumni.

Political fundraiser beefsteak banquets are no longer common in New Jersey; beefsteaks now usually raise money for fire departments, policemen's benevolent associations, and other charitable organizations. Nostalgia for beefsteaks among foodies continues, and gourmet beefsteaks are sometimes staged by New York-area restaurants.

Since 2009, two Wesleyan University graduates, Andrew Dermont and Derek Silverman, have thrown a biannual "beefsteak for beefsteak's sake" in Brooklyn, to revive the tradition of the beefsteak banquet in its place of origin, New York City.

Since 2011, Chef Neal Fraser, Cort Cass, Matt Selman and Eric Wareheim have hosted a beefsteak in Los Angeles to raise money for the LA Food Bank.
