= Potluck =

Communal dining event

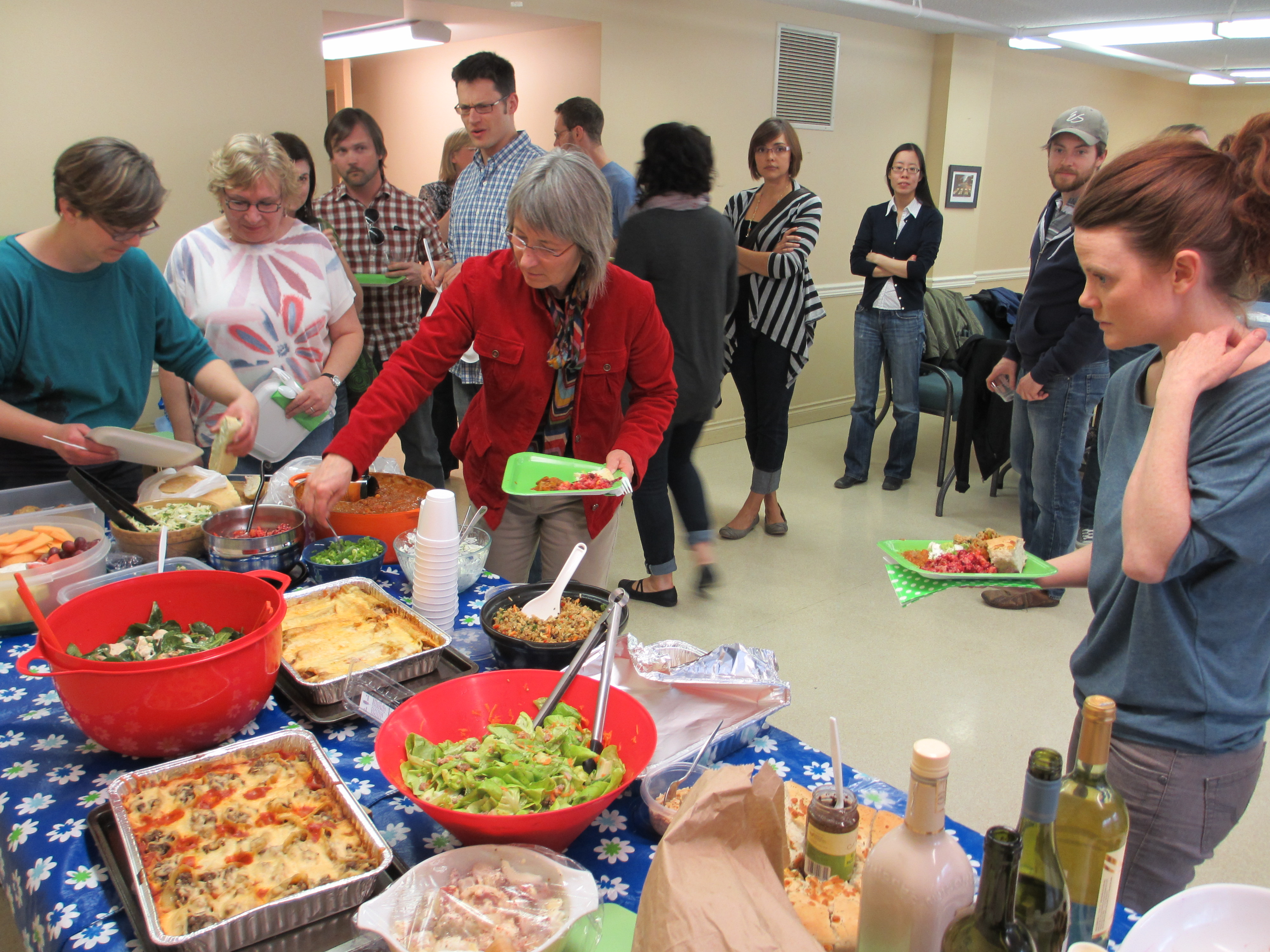
An assorted spread of dishes at a potluck in Alberta, Canada

Potlucks are events in which attendees each bring a dish of food to be shared. Potlucks are organized among members of communities, organisations, or by individuals at their homes. Their structure departs from most other dining events, with socializing influenced by the absence of any host preparing food. Sociologist Alice Julier identifies the key themes of the potluck as abundance, uncertainty as to what will be served, and variety, which may cause consternation in cultures with opposing values around entertaining guests.

Events organized in a potluck format have existed in various cultures, but the dominant modern form emerged in North America from earlier practices wherein guests tried their luck with what a host was cooking in a pot. Over the following centuries, the potluck became a tool employed by organizations for fundraising and in the mid-20th century as a key outlet for socializing.

== Names ==
Names for potlucks vary. In the Western United States, a potluck is known as a "basket meal", and in the Eastern United States as a "covered dish supper". Other names include "potluck dinner", "pitch-in", "shared lunch", "spread", "faith supper", "carry-in dinner", "fuddle", "dish party", "Jacob's Join", "bring-a-plate", "pot-providence" and "fellowship meal".

The first known use of the term is from the late 16th century, likely from the words pot and luck. The term does not reference the practice of Potlatch, a term that came later.

== History ==
In its original meaning, 'potluck' referred to pots on communal fires, and the notion that one had to try their luck with the unknown quality of their contents. In North America, this came to refer to events where attendees each contributed dishes, although as of 2013 little was written on how this evolution took place. Events containing the same dynamic were present outside of the United States, for instance in early forms of picnic and the pre-19th century smörgåsbord. Early American potlucks were held by Protestant churches, permitting a venue for matchmaking, building group cohesion, preventing juvenile delinquency and fundraising.

Over the course of the 19th and early 20th century, church potlucks evolved in American immigrant communities. By the 1930s, scenes such as those described in the 1840s of Norwegian farmers' wives bringing together multitudes of dishes "to share and to pass" were antiquated, and the potluck often served as a fundraising mechanism for ethnic minorities catering to an audience of different ethnicities. During the interwar period, potlucks were a common fundraising activity for churches and other community organizations. As World War II began and rationing set in, potlucks provided a way for households to entertain without needing to provide for every guest. Into the 1950s, potlucks continued their popularity as Tupperware gained uptake, making the transport of food to events easier. Three-bean salads were common at potlucks, as were casseroles, the latter lauded for their versatility and accessibility. Cookbooks profusely advised on how to produce the best potluck experiences, and social obligations proliferated. Such attitudes earned mockery from writer Peg Bracken in her The I Hate to Cook Book, where she humorously advised readers on how to meet the bare minimum of social expectations for potlucks.

== Concept ==
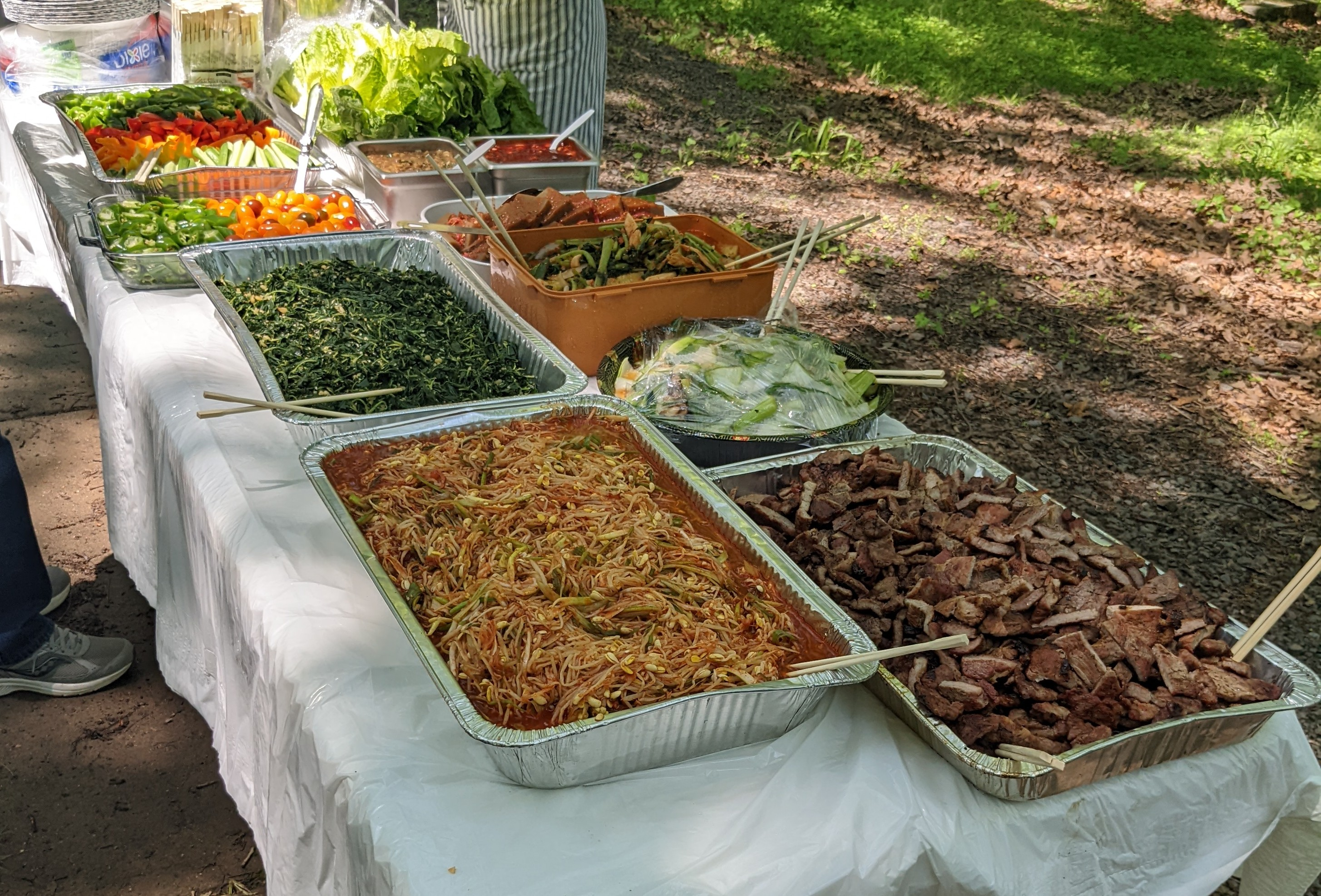
Various Korean dishes at a potluck

In the potluck, each attendee brings a dish cooked and ready to be served, sharing in the labor of preparation. Dishes may include salads, mains, or desserts. Potlucks are made distinct from feast practices by the individualized preparation of food.

Potlucks are held inside and outside of the home. Those held inside are distinct, more often put on as an opportunity for socializing rather than to gather community or organization. Casseroles dishes such as chop suey, spaghetti bolognese, and tuna casserole often feature.

=== Social norms ===
A key expectation is that each dish be large enough to be shared among a good portion of the anticipated guests. Other social norms include timely arrival, light socializing without drawing too much attention, and contributing a dish in accordance with expectations. Sociologist Alice Julier writes that while all social dining experiences rest on assumptions that what is provided will be reciprocated, potlucks are unusual in the immediacy at which this occurs.

The events are among the least formal in dining American culture, with different social expectations for guest and host, and a departure from the structure of a typical meal. Julier writes that the main themes are abundance, uncertainty, and variety. In Britain, where the potluck is not culturally embedded, these at times bring consternation, bringing perceptions that hosts are being "stingy and inhospitable."

The potluck in contemporary America serves as an outlet for socialising, with the fact of each dish being contributed by attendees permitting the event to proceed unencumbered by roles of host and guest, as well as other status considerations. The main source of conversation, according to sociologist Joseph Gusfield, is the food, giving people a shared reference of likes and topics, including skill and identity.

== Religion ==
Most critical attention on the potluck focuses on its presence at church dinners.

== See also ==
- Buffet
- Free lunch
- Pampa mesa

== Sources ==
- Aldrich, Elizabeth (2023). Casseroles, Can Openers, and Jell-O: American Food and the Cold War, 1947–1959. State University of New York Press. ISBN 978-1-438-49306-0.
- Davidson, Alan; Jaine, Tom, eds. (2014). The Oxford Companion to Food (3rd ed.). Oxford University Press. ISBN 9780191756276.
  - Davidson, Alan (2014a). "Casserole". In Davidson & Jaine (2014).
  - Davidson, Alan (2014b). "Smörgåsbord". In Davidson & Jaine (2014).
  - Davidson, Jane (2014c). "Picnic". In Davidson & Jaine (2014).
  - Jaine, Tom. "Potluck". In Davidson & Jaine (2014).
- Fieldhouse, Paul (1995). Food and Nutrition: Customs and Culture (2nd ed.). London: Chapman & Hall. ISBN 0-412-58110-8.
- Gabaccia, Donna R (1998). We Are What We Eat: Ethnic Food and the Making of Americans. Cambridge, Massachusetts and London: Harvard University Press. ISBN 0-674-00190-7.
- Inness, Sherrie A (2001). Dinner Roles: American Women and Culinary Culture. Iowa City: University of Iowa Press. ISBN 0-87745-763-8.
- Lovegren, Sylvia (1995). Fashionable Food: Seven Decades of Food Fads. New York: Macmillan. ISBN 978-0-02-575705-9.
- Julier, Alice (2013). Eating Together: Food, Friendship, and Inequality. University of Illinois Press. ISBN 978-0-252-03763-4.
- Kittredge, Katharine (2021). "Dishwater Hands across the Pantry". In Harde, Roxanne; Wesselius, Janet (eds.). Consumption and the Literary Cookbook. New York and Abingdon, Oxon: Routledge. ISBN 978-0-367-63530-5.
- Mosby, Ian (2014). Food Will Win the War: The Politics, Culture, and Science of Food on Canada’s Home Front. Vancouver: UBC Press. ISBN 978-0-774-82763-8.
