= Pampa mesa =

Communal meal in Ecuador, with food laid directly on a cloth spread on the ground

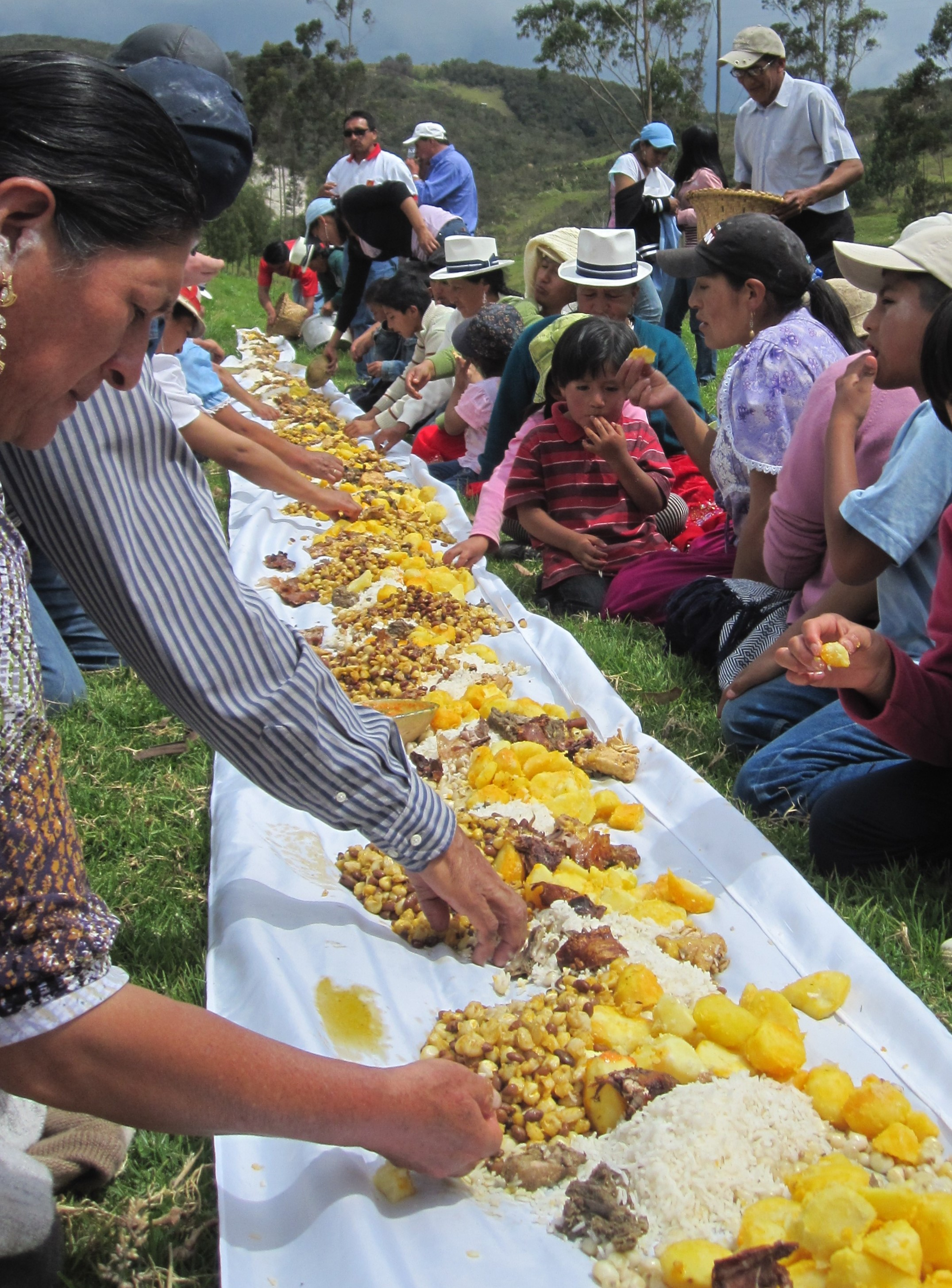
Pampa mesa during Carnival (Carnaval) in Parcoloma, Ecuador

In indigenous communities of the Ecuadorian highlands, a pampa mesa or pamba mesa is a communal meal of food laid directly on a cloth spread on the ground. The meal is seen as an act of social solidarity; it also has mythological connotations.

== Etymology ==
The name "pampa mesa" comes from the Kichwa pampa, meaning "ground" or "plain", and Spanish mesa, meaning "table".

== Description ==
The origins of the pampa mesa tradition are unknown. Pampa mesas often are used at festivals, at family celebrations, or after mingas (gatherings for communal work).

For a pampa mesa, a long, typically white cloth is spread on the ground. Traditionally, participants in a pampa mesa bring the food they are able to share, and each spreads the food he or she brought along the cloth for all to eat. Once the food is spread along the cloth, participants sit along the cloth and use their hands to eat, rather than using utensils and dishes. Before eating, a community leader may give thanks for the food, and a portion of the food may be buried as an offering to the earth mother.

The food on a pampa mesa tends to be largely staple items such as mote, potatoes, quinoa, oca, carrots, and fava beans. Sometimes, cuy (guinea pig) and other meats are present. Flowers and fruits may be used to decorate the pampa mesa. The spicy condiment ají frequently is served alongside the pampa mesa. The fermented beverage chicha de jora sometimes accompanies a pampa mesa.

== Interpretation ==
Pampa mesas are a form of social solidarity: all contribute as they are able, and partake as they wish. Some believe that sitting on the earth and eating from a pampa mesa is a form of connection with Pachamama (earth mother), a goddess in Inca mythology who continues to be an object of reverence in Ecuador. A pampa mesa also may be seen as an act of thanksgiving for the harvest.

== Similar practices ==
A similar tradition in Peru and Bolivia is called apthapi.
