= List of painters from Georgia (country) =

This is a list of notable painters from, or associated with, Georgia.

== A ==
- Merab Abramishvili (1957-2006)
- David Alexidze (born 1966)
- Elene Akhvlediani (1898-1975)
- Alexander (Sandro) Antadze (born 1972)

== B ==
- Alexander Bazhbeuk-Melikyan (1891-1966)
- Lavinia Bazhbeuk-Melikyan (1922-2005)
- Gia Bugadze (born 1956)

== D ==
- Guram Dolenjashvili (born 1943)

== E ==
- Robert Elibekyan (born 1941)

== G ==
- Gigo Gabashvili (1862-1936)
- Lado Gudiashvili (1896-1980)
- Gia Gugushvili (born 1952)

== H ==
- Henryk Hryniewski (1869-1937)

== J ==
- Ucha Japaridze (1906-1988)

== K ==
- David Kakabadze (1889-1952)
- Gayane Khachaturian (1942-2009)
- Shalva Kikodze (1894-1921)
- Sergo Kobuladze (1909-1978)

== L ==
- Levan Lagidze (born 1958)

== M ==
- Grigol Maisuradze (1817-1885)
- Nana Meskhidze (1936-1997)
- Shota and Margarita Metreveli (1913-1983, 1913–1984)

== O ==
- Irakli Ochiauri (1924-2015)

== P ==
- Rusudan Petviashvili (born 1968)
- Niko Pirosmani (1862-1918)

== S ==
- Lado Seidishvili (1931-2010)
- Dimitri Shevardnadze (1885-1937)
- Valerian Sidamon-Eristavi (1889-1943)

== T ==
- Mamuka Tavakalashvili
- Radish Tordia (born 1936)
- Zurab Tsereteli (1934-2025)

== V ==
- Avto Varazi (1926-1977)
