= Georgian art =

Georgian art (Georgian: ქართული ხელოვნება, romanized: kartuli khelovneba) grew along with the development of the Georgian statehood, starting from the ancient kingdoms of Colchis and Iberia and flourishing in the Middle Ages during the Kingdom of Georgia. Because of Georgia's location at the intersection of continents and numerous civilizations, over the centuries the country attracted travelers, merchants, missionaries and conquerors of all kinds and creeds, all of which left marks on the country's cultural and artistic environment throughout its history. Georgian art tradition has thus experienced influences from Mesopotamian, Anatolian, Greek, Persian, Roman and Byzantine art throughout antiquity. It has further grown within the framework of Christian ecclesiastical and middle-eastern art of the Middle Ages, and ultimately it has evolved in the context of European and Russian art from the 19th century onward.

Georgian art blossomed further during the perestroika movement in the 1980s.

== Antiquity ==
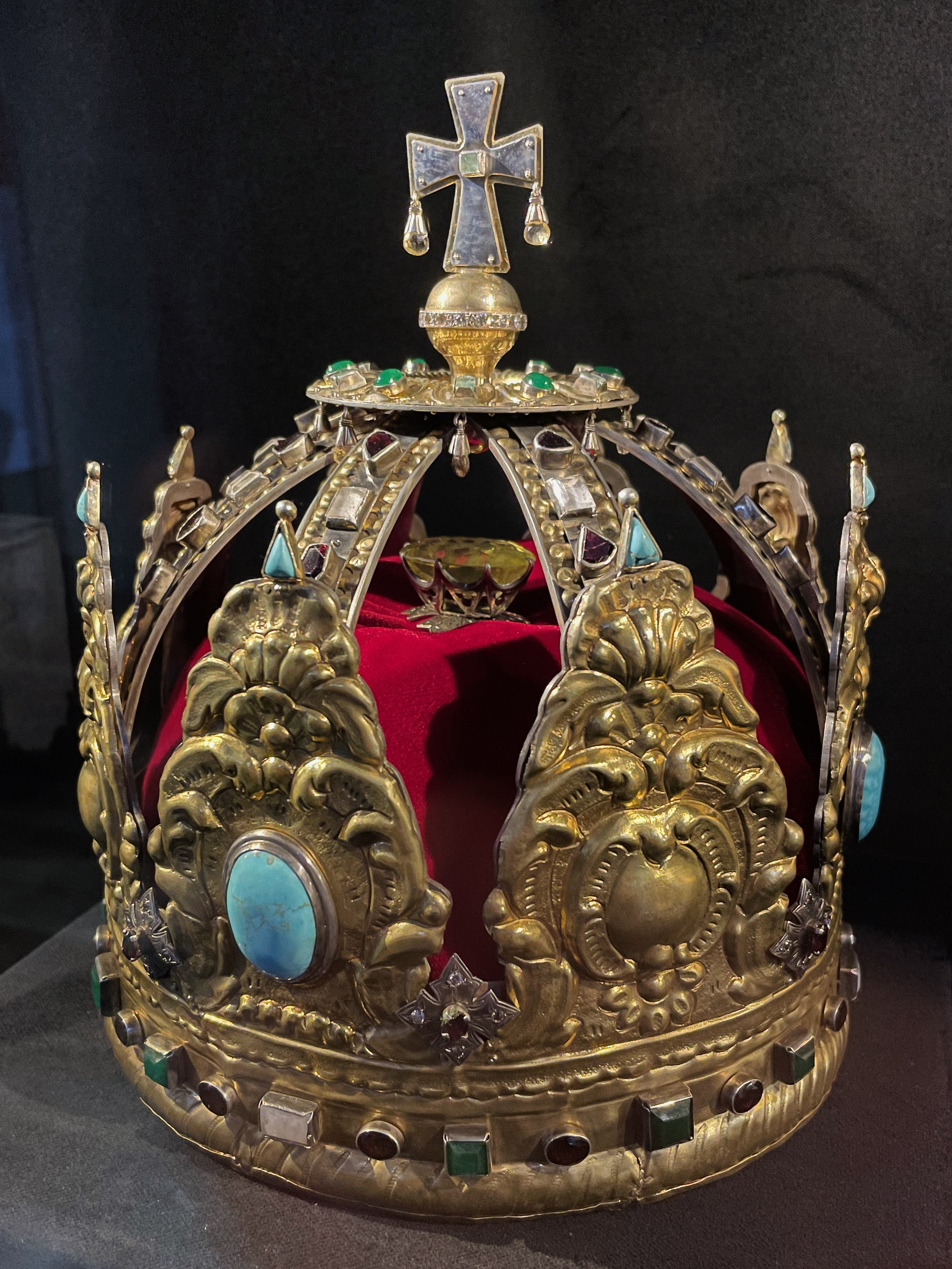
Ceremonial crown from Georgia, an example of metalwork from the early modern period

As Georgia adopted Christianity in the 4th century, its art evolved alongside the theological and cultural trends emerging from the Byzantine Empire. Georgian artists, while embracing the Byzantine style, adapted it to their own regional context, creating their own interpretations of Christian themes. This can be seen in the depiction of Christ, the Virgin Mary, and various saints, which, while having their roots deep in Byzantine conventions, display local Georgian styles. For example, in the "Lions of the Transfiguration" from the Zemo Monastery, the iconography of the Transfiguration of Jesus shows this mix of styles.

== Georgian artists ==
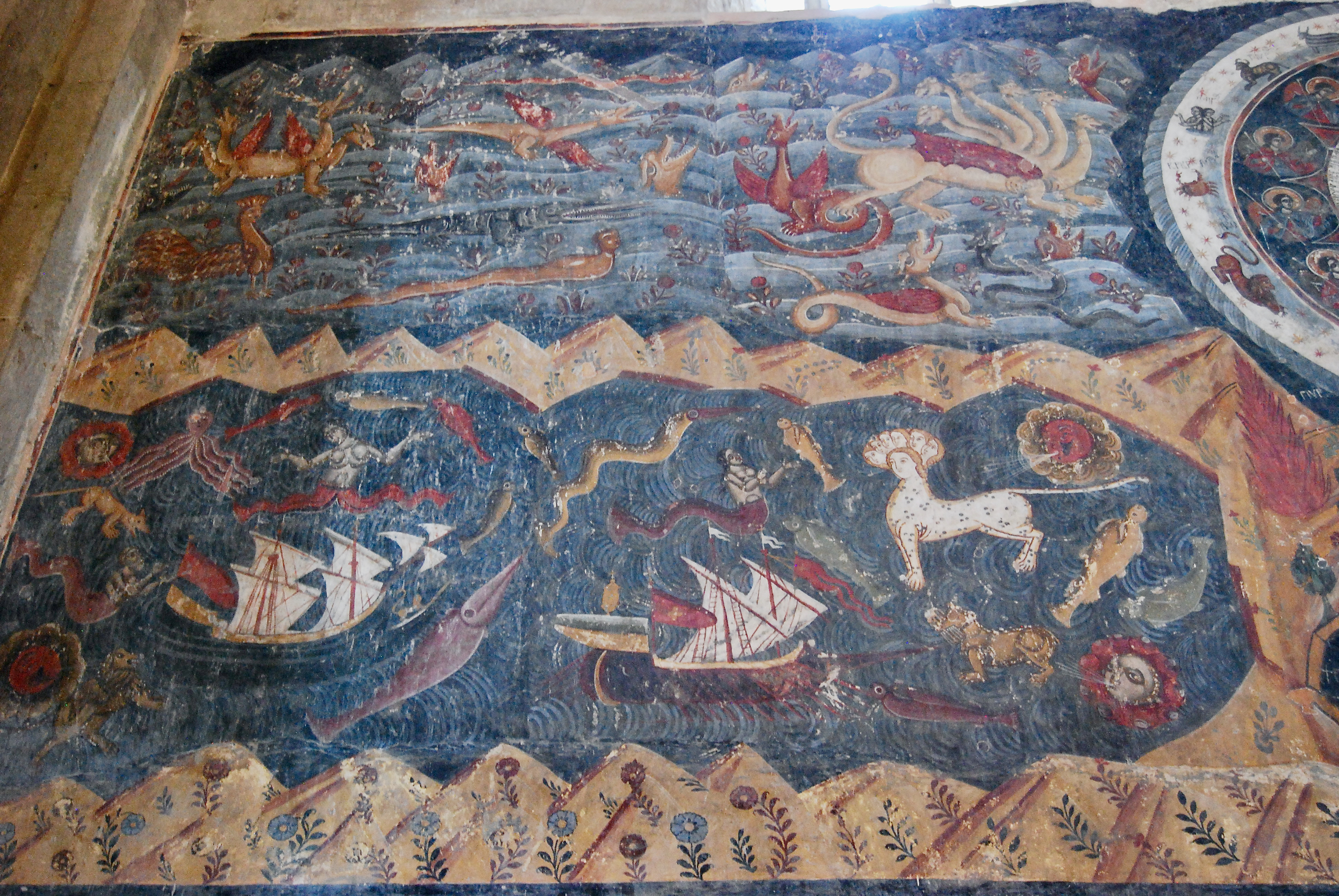
Frescoes from the Svetitskhoveli Cathedral, an example of Georgian medieval art depicting ships and monsters at sea.

- Levan Songulashvili
- David Alexidze
- Elene Akhvlediani
- Gia Bugadze
- Gigo Gabashvili
- Irakli Gamrekeli
- Lado Gudiashvili
- Gia Gugushvili
- Levan Lagidze
- David Kakabadze
- Shalva Kikodze
- Sergo Kobuladze
- Mamuka Japharidze
- Ucha Japaridze
- Temo Javakhi
- Irakli Parjiani
- Niko Pirosmani
- Dimitri Shevardnadze
- Valerian Sidamon-Eristavi
- Oleg Timchenko
- Zurab Tsereteli
- Avto Varazi
- Alexander Mrevlishvili

== See also ==
- History of Georgia
- Culture of Georgia
