= Simon Janashia Museum of Georgia =

Museum in Tbilisi, Georgia

Coordinates: 41.6960°N 44.8003°E

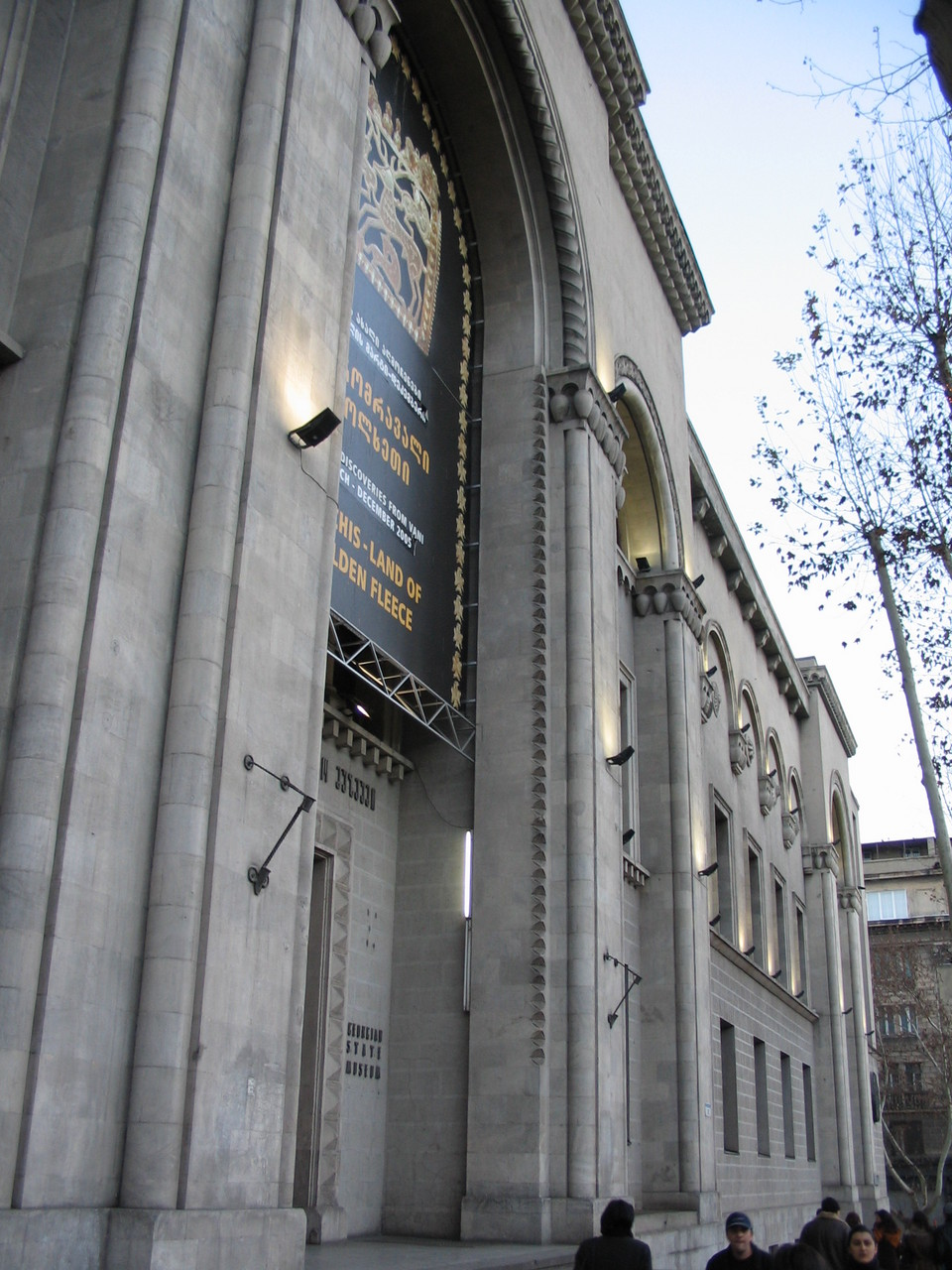
Simon Janashia Museum of Georgia

The Simon Janashia Museum of Georgia (Georgian: სიმონ ჯანაშიას სახელობის საქართველოს მუზეუმი), formerly known as the State Museum of History of Georgia, is one of the main history museums in Tbilisi, Georgia, which displays the country's principal archaeological findings.

The museum evolved from the museum of the Caucasian Department of the Russian Imperial Geographic Society, founded on May 10, 1852, and converted into the Caucasian Museum on the initiative of the German explorer Gustav Radde in 1865. After Georgia regained independence from Russia (1918), the museum was renamed into the Museum of Georgia in 1919. Noe Kipiani was the first director of the museum. A bulk of its collection was evacuated by the Government of Georgia to Europe following the Bolshevik takeover of the country in 1921, and was returned to Soviet Georgia through the efforts of the Georgian émigré scholar Ekvtime Takaishvili in 1945. In 1947, the museum was named after the late Georgian historian Simon Janashia. The museum suffered significantly during the years of post-Soviet turmoil in Georgia early in the 1990s: It was first damaged in fighting during the military coup in 1991–2, followed by the destruction of part of its collection by fire. In 2004, the Janashia Museum was integrated with other leading Georgian museums under a joint management system of the Georgian National Museum.

The museum occupies chronologically and stylistically diverse buildings in downtown Tbilisi, with the main exhibition located in Rustaveli Avenue. This latter edifice was designed utilizing elements of medieval Georgian décor by the architect Nikolay Severov in 1910 in the place of an older building authored by A. Zaltsman.

The museum houses hundreds of thousands of Georgian and Caucasian archaeological and ethnographical artifacts. A permanent exhibition chronologically follows the development of Georgia's material culture from the Bronze Age to the early 20th century. Some of the museum's most valuable exhibits include the Homo Ergaster fossils discovered at Dmanisi; the Akhalgori hoard of the 5th century BC which contains unique examples of jewelry, blending Achaemenid and local inspirations; a collection of approximately 80,000 coins, chiefly of Georgian minting; medieval icons and goldsmith pieces brought here from various archeological sites in Georgia; Shukhuti's mosaic, a bath mosaic from the village of Shukhuti that dates from the 4th-5th century; and a lapidary which includes one of the world's richest collection of Urartian inscriptions.
