= Bugadze =

Bugadze (Georgian: ბუღაძე) is a Georgian surname. Notable people with the surname include:

- Gia Bugadze (born 1956), contemporary Georgian artist
- Lasha Bugadze (born 1977), Georgian novelist and playwright
