= Apollon Kutateladze =

Georgian painter

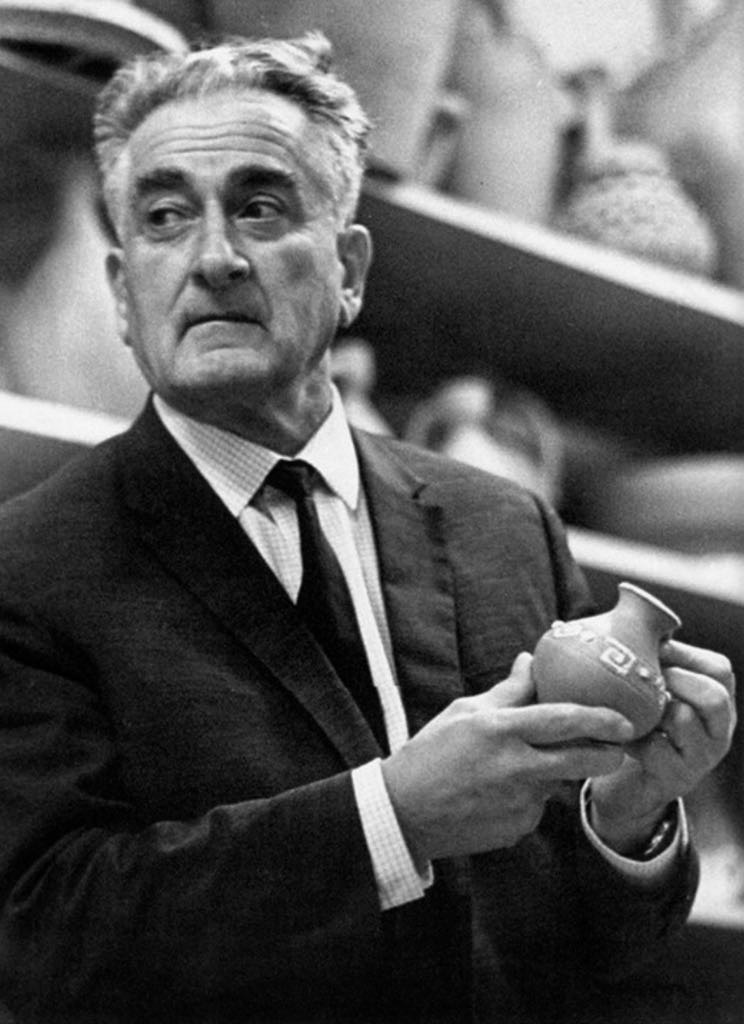
- Apollon Kutateladze in his artist workshop
- Born: January 6, 1900; Khoni, Kutaisi uezd, Kutaisi Governorate, Russian Empire
- Died: June 25, 1972 (aged 72); Tbilisi, Georgian SSR, Soviet Union
- Resting place: Didube Pantheon
- Education: Eugene Lanceray, Gigo Gabashvili, Iosif Adolfovich Charlemagne
- Alma mater: Tbilisi State Academy of Arts
- Known for: Painting, drawing, design, graphic design
- Style: Socialist realism
- Movement: Tbilisi State Academy of Arts
- Memorials: Apolon Kutateladze Tbilisi State Academy of Arts

Apollon Karamanovich Kutateladze (Georgian: აპოლონ ქუთათელაძე, 6 January 1900 – June 25, 1972) was a Soviet and Georgian painter.

== Early life ==
Apollon Kutateladze started to study in Poti, Georgia. He continued to study at the "Caucasian society of artist support" school, where he specialised in art from 1914 to 1915. In 1915, he quit Poti to join the "Nikolay Sklifosovsky" Academy of Painting and Drawing in the capital, Tbilisi, before joining the Georgian army in 1916. He was sent to battle in 1921 against the Red Army, as part of the Georgian War of Independence.

After his demobilisation, he participated to the satirical journal "Nalgui" (transl. Crocodile) in Tbilisi. He graduated from Tbilisi State Academy of Arts in 1926 after studying four years with teachers Eugene Lanceray, Gigo Gabashvili and Iosif Adolfovich Charlemagne. He has had several academic trips to Leningrad.

== Career ==
From 1943 onward, Apollon Kutateladze established himself in Tbilisi and taught at Tbilisi State Academy of Arts, of which he became the rector in 1959. He put in place in the Academy a new pedagogical method of teaching Arts, which consisted in education, practise (workshop creation) and construction (projects from industrial partners). This left the classical art pedagogical methods behind, to the profit of the new method derived from the three principles of Walter Gropius in Bauhaus.

Throughout his career, Apollon Kutateldaze received two Orders of the Badge of Honour and an Order of the Red Banner of Labour, and became a People's Artist of the USSR in visual arts.

== Personal life ==
Apollon Kutateladze married Vera Georgievna Megreladze. He has had two sons: Tariel Kutateladze (architect) and Guram Kutateladze (painter).

His second wife, Maria Ivanovna Edokimova, gave him two daughters: Manana Kutateladze and Nana Kutateladze (who married Georgy Konstantinovich Totibadze).

His third and last wife was Mirel Zdanevich (daughter of Kirill Zdanevich) gave him his last son: Karaman Kutateladze (painter), before Apollon Kutateladze's death in 1972.

== Heritage ==
Tbilisi State Academy of Arts was renamed Apollon Kutateladze State Academy of Arts after his death in 1972. A street in Tbilisi was also renamed Apollon Kutateladze Street around 2000. Apollon Kutateladze was buried in the Didube Pantheon in Tbilisi.

== Works ==
Apollon Kutateladze has created a large quantity of works during his lifetime, of which many historical scenes and portraits, such as:

- "Comrade Stalin heading the Batumi workers' protest"
- "Conversation between comrade Stalin and the peasants of Adjara in 1902"
- Comrade Stalin with Mother (1930)
- paintings «Sergo Ordzhonikidze encourages mountaineers to come to the defense of Grozny» (1938)
- «a Joyful harvest» (1953)
- «On the plantations of Georgia» (1957)
- «grape Harvest» (1961)
- «March of Queen Tamara» (1967)
- «the Hunting Queen Tamar» (1970)
