= Metreveli =

Metreveli or Metreweli (Georgian: მეტრეველი) is a Georgian surname. Notable people include:

- Aleksandre Metreveli, Georgian tennis player
- Alex Metreveli, Soviet-Georgian tennis player
- Blaise Metreweli, head of the British Secret Intelligence Service
- Roin Metreveli, Georgian historian, rector of Tbilisi State University
- Shota and Margarita Metreveli, Georgian artists
- Slava Metreveli, Soviet-Georgian footballer
