= Rustaveli =

Rustaveli may refer to:

- Shota Rustaveli (1172–1216), a Georgian poet
- Rustaveli Avenue in Tbilisi, Georgia named after the poet
- Rustaveli Theatre, a drama theatre in Tbilisi named after the poet
- Rustaveli (Tbilisi Metro), a Tbilisi Metro station named after the poet
- Rustaveli cinema, a movie theater in Tbilisi
- The title of the Georgian Orthodox bishop of Rustavi (and of Marneuli)
