= Guram =

- Gender: Male
- Language: Georgian

Origin
- Region of origin: Georgia

Guram (Georgian: გურამ) is a Georgian masculine given name. Notable people with the name include:

- Guram Adzhoyev (footballer, born 1961) (born 1961), Georgian-born Russian footballer
- Guram Adzhoyev (footballer, born 1995) (born 1995), Hungarian-born footballer
- Guram Batiashvili (born 1938), Georgian writer and playwright
- Guram Kashia (born 1987), Georgian footballer
- Guram Kostava (born 1937), Georgian-Soviet fencer
- Guram Dochanashvili (1939–2021), Georgian writer and historian
- Guram Dolenjashvili (born 1943), Georgian painter
- Guram Gabiskiria (1947–1993), Georgian politician
- Guram Gumba (born 1956), Abkhaz historian
- Guram Makayev (born 1970), Kazakhstani footballer
- Guram Mamulia (1937–2003), Georgian historian, politician and Meskhetian rights campaigner
- Guram Mchedlidze (1931–2009), Georgian paleobiologist and academician
- Guram Minashvili (1935–2015), Georgian-Soviet basketball player
- Guram Nikolaishvili (born 1952), Georgian Army general
- Guram Pherselidze (born 1985), Georgian wrestler
- Guram Rcheulishvili (1934–1960), Georgian writer
- Guram Sagaradze (actor) (1929–2013), Georgian actor
- Guram Sagaradze (wrestler) (born 1939), Georgian wrestler
- Guram Sharadze (1940–2007), Georgian philologist, historian and politician
- Guram Tetrashvili (born 1988), Georgian footballer
- Guram Tskhovrebov (1938–1998), Georgian-Soviet footballer
