= Merab Merabishvili =

Georgian sculptor (1931–2022)

- მერაბ მერაბიშვილი
- Born: 6 July 1931; Tbilisi, Transcaucasian SFSR, Soviet Union
- Died: 11 January 2022 (aged 90); Tbilisi, Georgia
- Occupation: Sculptor
- Years active: 1955–2022

Merab Konstantines dze Merabishvili (Georgian: მერაბ მერაბიშვილი; 6 July 1931 – 11 January 2022) was a Georgian sculptor known for his monumental public works. He was named a People's Illustrator of the Georgian SSR (Note: Georgian: საქართველოს სსრ სახალხო მხატვარი; the Georgian SSR honorary title for distinguished visual artists, distinct from the award for performering artists (Georgian: საქართველოს სსრ სახალხო არტისტი)) in 1980, and was a full member of both the USSR Academy of Arts and the Georgian National Academy of Sciences.

== Early life and education ==
Merabishvili was born on 6 July 1931 in Tbilisi, the son of the sculptor Konstantine Merabishvili. In 1955 he graduated in sculpture from the Tbilisi State Academy of Arts, where he had studied under his father.

== Career ==
Merabishvili taught at the Tbilisi State Academy of Arts from 1961, becoming a professor in 1978 and later head of its drawing department. He was elected a full member of the USSR Academy of Arts in 1988 and an academician of the Georgian National Academy of Sciences in 1996.

Working in a realist, monumental idiom, he created many public monuments. Among them are the monument to Alexander Griboyedov in Tbilisi (1961), the equestrian monument to King Erekle II in Telavi (1971), a monument to Georgi Dimitrov in Moscow (1972, with his father), equestrian monuments to General Pyotr Bagration in Tbilisi (1984) and Moscow (1999), and a monument to Shota Rustaveli later installed in Budapest.

== Awards and honours ==
- People's Artist of the Georgian SSR (visual arts; სახალხო მხატვარი), 1980
- Honorary Citizen of Tbilisi (2002)
- Order of Honour (2001)
- Gold Medal of the Russian Academy of Arts

== Death ==
Merabishvili died in Tbilisi on 11 January 2022, aged 90, and was buried beside his father.
