= David Alexidze =

Georgian artist (born 1966)

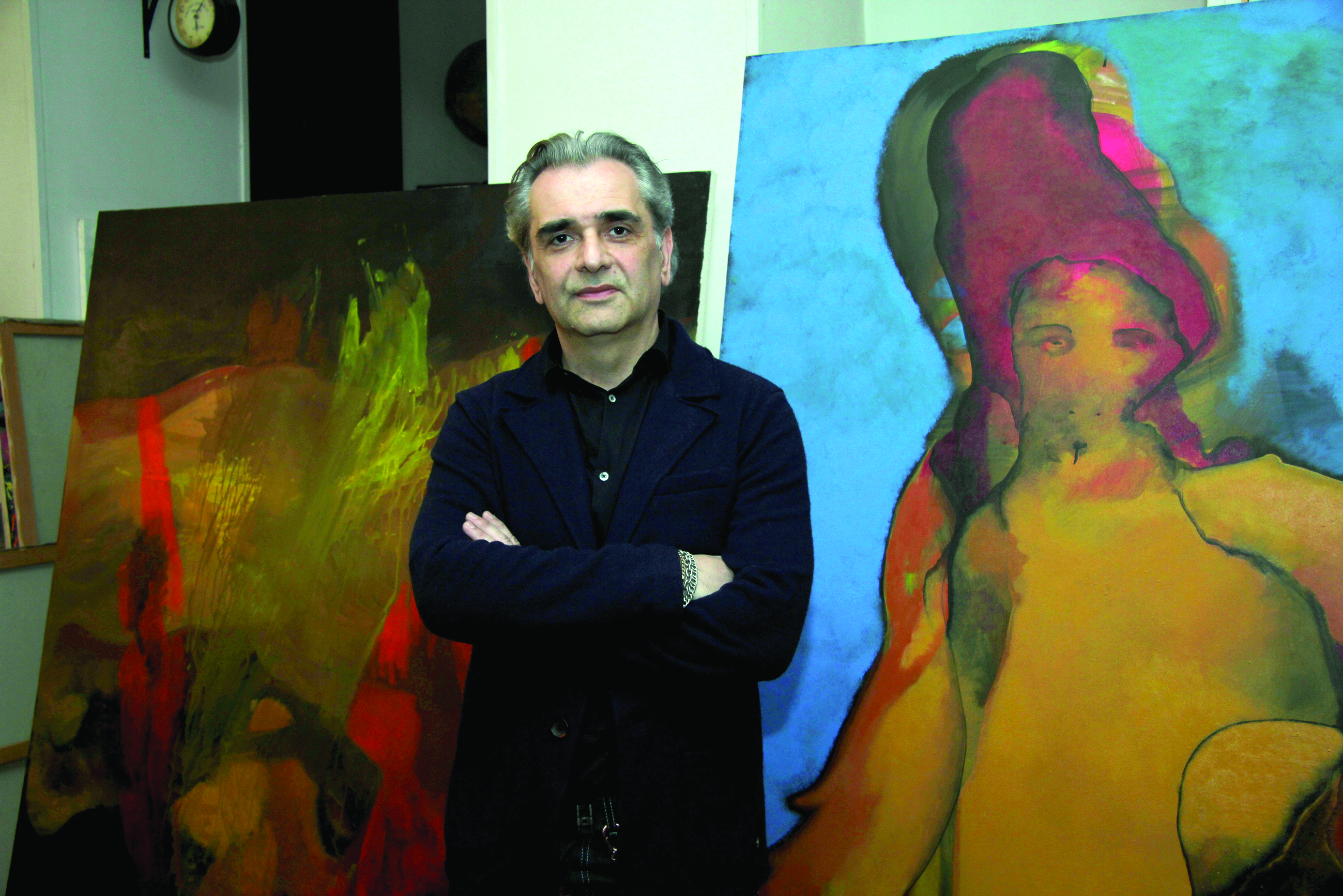
- David Alexidze in front of his paintings at the Tbilisi State Academy of Arts, 2016
- Born: April 10, 1966 (age 59); Tbilisi, Georgia
- Education: Tbilisi State Academy of Arts
- Known for: painting, graphic
- Notable work: The Gift to Adelaide, Venetian Mask, Watermelon Seller, A Tree

David Alexidze (Georgian: დავით ალექსიძე; born 10 April 1966) is a Georgian artist. His art can most precisely be described as mystic realism. His works are introduced in many catalogues and preserved in various private collections. He was the Dean of the Faculty of Visual arts of Tbilisi State Academy of Arts.

== Education ==
Georgian art went through the complicated process of changes in 1990s, preceded by the decade which had formed and evolved new trends. The end of the Soviet era ( Revolutions of 1989 ) had severe impact on the country itself, followed by collapse of the fundamentals, the Georgian Civil War, notion of the upcoming disasters, hopelessness - nothing horizontal or vertical and as a result - amorphous visual expression in the Georgian cultural narrative. This was when artist David Alexidze first shared his art works with the public. It did not take him much effort to get established within the then active Georgian artistic society, where he found his place right after graduation from Tbilisi State Academy of Arts, Nikoloz (Koka) Ignatov ’s Workshop, 1988-1991. He was a prodigy in arts, having created in his early years a sophisticated artistic system through active philosophical and critical thinking.

== Artwork ==
In general four trends can be identified in Davit Alexidze’s art: graphical works on black background, figurative paintings on black background (times on textured surface) of elongated vertical or horizontal picture planes, yellow series and black-and-white abstract arts. Alexidze’s art is being created in late 20th and early 21st century. It is a collection of real senses, which regardless the richness of colors, is quite dark, although the audience does not get lost in this gloom; and this is a kind of a game or an idea on gaming, which is bright new to Georgian art.
