= Nikolay Severov =

Soviet architect and architectural historian (1887–1957)

Nikolai Severov
- Никола́й Па́влович Се́веров
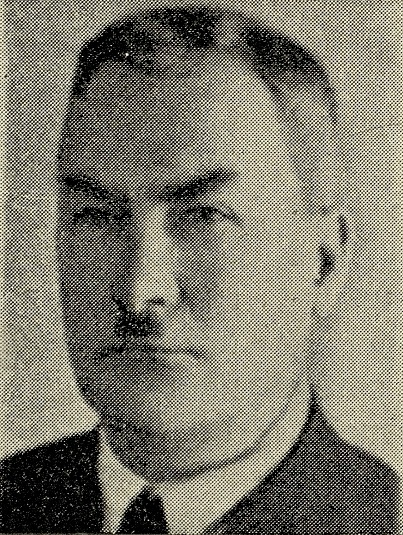
- Born: Nikolai Pavlovich Severov; 2 March 1887; Tiflis, Tiflis Governorate, Russian Empire
- Died: 21 February 1957 (aged 69); Kyiv, Ukrainian SSR, Soviet Union
- Education: Institute of Civil Engineers, Saint Petersburg
- Occupation: Architect
- Awards: Order of the Red Banner of Labour

Nikolai Pavlovich Severov (2 March 1887 – 21 February 1957) was a Soviet architect and architectural historian who served as Chairman of the Union of Architects of the Georgian SSR (1935–1948) and was a professor at the Tbilisi State Academy of Arts. He is best known for designing the Rustaveli Cinema in Tbilisi and for his documentation of medieval Georgian architectural monuments.

== Early life and education ==
Severov was born on 2 March 1887 in Tiflis (now Tbilisi), in the Tiflis Governorate of the Russian Empire. He attended secondary school in Vladikavkaz.

In 1904, Severov moved to Saint Petersburg, where he studied watercolour at the Saint Petersburg Stieglitz State Academy of Art and Design. In 1905, he passed the entrance examination for the Institute of Civil Engineers, where he studied architecture. His first independent project was the railway station in Feodosiya.

Following the outbreak of World War I, Severov completed his studies in 1915 and was subsequently conscripted into the army.

== Career in Tbilisi (1918–1948) ==
After the Russian Revolution, Severov returned to Tiflis in 1918. He worked within the Committee of State Constructions from 1921 to 1932 and later served as Chief Architect of Gruzkurortstroy, the Georgian resort construction authority from 1932 to 1942.

From 1922 to 1948, he taught at the Tbilisi State Academy of Arts, becoming a full professor and serving as dean of the architecture faculty from 1945 to 1948.

In 1935, Severov was appointed Chairman of the Union of Architects of the Georgian SSR, a post he held until 1948. In 1939, he was elected an Honorary Member of the Academy of Architecture of the USSR.

During World War II, in 1942, he became Director of the Institute of the History of Georgian Art at the Georgian Academy of Sciences.

Severov joined the Communist Party of the Soviet Union in 1954.

=== Selected architectural works ===
Year	Building	Location	Notes
1927–1929	Reconstruction of the Simon Janashia Museum of Georgia	Tbilisi	
1929–1930	Building of the Central Committee of the Communist Party of Georgia	Tbilisi	
1930	Building at 4 9 April Street	Tbilisi	Described as one of the earliest modernist buildings in Tbilisi
1933	Sanatorium of the VTsSPS	Likani	With D.I. Fomin
1933–1935	Rest House of the Council of People's Commissars of the Georgian SSR	Gagra	
1935	Cheluskintsy Bridge	Tbilisi	With K. Zavriev and N. Slovinsky
1935–1939	Rustaveli Cinema	Tbilisi	1,200-seat cinema on Rustaveli Avenue; Stalinist architecture; cultural heritage monument since 1988

== Later life ==
In 1948, Severov relocated to Kyiv, Ukrainian SSR, where he was elected a Full Member of the Academy of Architecture of the Ukrainian SSR (1948–1955). He died in Kyiv on 21 February 1957.

== Honours and awards ==
- Order of the Red Banner of Labour
- Honorary Member, Academy of Architecture of the USSR (1939)
- Full Member, Academy of Architecture of the Ukrainian SSR (1948)

== See also ==
- Rustaveli Cinema
- Valentin Topuridze
- Tbilisi State Academy of Arts
- Giorgi Chubinashvili
- Architecture of Georgia (country)
