= Temo Javakhi =

Georgian artist

Temur Javakhishvili
- თემურ ჯავახიშვილი
- Born: Temur Javakhishvili; 1951 (age 74–75); Georgia
- Education: Tbilisi State Academy of Arts
- Known for: Video art; installation; painting; performance art
- Notable work: "Man with a pipe", Word Objects – MIRRORIMM, The Knight in the Panther's Skin
- Style: Conceptual, Dadaist, Postmodernist
- Movement: Contemporary art

Temur Javakhishvili (Georgian: თემურ ჯავახიშვილი), known professionally as Temo Javakhi (Georgian: თემო ჯავახი), is a Georgian artist born in 1951. Javakhi works in various media – video art, installation, painting, action/performance art. Javakhi shows his individual approach of conceptual analysis by playing with Dadaist forms, using postmodernist irony and expression.

== Career ==
Javakhi graduated from Tbilisi State Academy of Arts in 1976 and since then, he has participated in up to 80 exhibitions and international projects. From 1985, he has been a member of the Artists Union in Georgia. Since 2015, Javakhi has been working as a visiting professor at Tbilisi State Academy of Arts.

In 2022, Javakhi participated in a Hôtel Drouot auction with his painting "Man with a pipe" estimated at 1000-1500 EUR.

Javakhi works in different mediums and creates with different non-traditional materials: in addition to conceptual easel works, artistic word objects, photo art, and installations, the artist works in video art.

He has participated in exhibitions since 1976, both in Georgia and abroad. In 2010, he participated in the exhibition project Do Not Try to Understand Me, held at the Villa Arson Center for Contemporary Art in Paris (Curators: E. Mangion. and S. Pluot. ).

In August 2016, the Tbilisi National Gallery hosted a large personal exhibition of the artist: Word Objects – MIRRORIMM. Around 150 of the artist's works were presented: art objects, visual documentation, 11 samples of video art, word objects, and installations, also the series The Knight in the Panther's Skin, which is preserved in the archives of the Georgian National Museum. Javakhi started his active work in the field of contemporary art in 1983, but before that, he had done some early experimental videos and conceptual works.

== List of Exhibitions and Projects (Selected) ==
- 2019 – "Invalid Memorabilia", G. Leonidze State Museum of Georgian Literature, Tbilisi, Georgia
- 2018 – International group exhibition – "State of Play", Aliyev Contemporary Art Center, Baku, Azerbaijan
- 2018 – International group exhibition, "State of Play", Contemporary Art Gallery, Karvasla, Tbilisi, Georgia
- 2016 – Solo exhibition MIRRORRIM, National Gallery, Tbilisi, Georgia
- 2015 – Project "The Knight in the Panther's Skin (Vepkhistkaosani ) – Artist's book", Georgian National Museum, Tbilisi, Georgia
- 2015 – International exhibition "A letter finds the addressee" Paris, France; New York, USA
- 2014 – International project "Font", Tbilisi, Georgia; Bochum, Germany
- 2013 – International exhibition "Georgian Video Art", Aarhus, Denmark
- 2012 – Underground of 1980–90's, Tbilisi National Gallery, Georgia
- 2012 – International exhibition, gallery "Alte Schule Adlershof", Berlin, Germany
- 2011 – International project "TRANS", Contemporary Art Center, Paris, France
- 2010 – International project "Stop Trying to Understand Me", Nice, France
- 2009 – International exhibition "Tbilisi Underground", Nantes, France
- 2008 – International exhibition, Frankfurt, Marburg, Germany
- 2003 – International forum "Caucasus" (Photography, Video, Cinema) Strasbourg, Mulhouse, France
- 2002 – International project "Art-Agitation", Yekaterinburg, Russia
- 1999 – Solo project "From East to West", N – Gallery, Tbilisi, Georgia
- 1998 – Performance "Kart-Veli" (Georgian), Tbilisi, Georgia
- 1997 – Solo project "TRANS" and video "Silk Man", Old Gallery, Tbilisi, Georgia
- 1994 – Solo exhibition "P.S." Tbilisi State Theatre of Marionettes, Georgia
- 1991 – Solo exhibition "Lettrism", Tbilisi History Museum Karvasla, Georgia
- 1976 – Exhibition "Young Artists", National Gallery, Tbilisi, Georgia
