= Alexander (Sandro) Antadze =

Georgian artist

Alexander (Sandro) Antadze (born 5 May 1972 in Tbilisi, Georgia) is an artist and an architect. In 1996 he graduated from Tbilisi State Academy of Arts.

== Group exhibitions ==
- 1996 "Georgian Artists Show" El-Kuwait, Kuwait
- 2000 "Peace and Colour Gallery" Gallery N 27, Cork Street, London, UK
- 2001 "N Gallery" Exhibition, Georgia, Tbilisi
- 2001 "Peace and Colour Gallery" Gallery N 27, Cork Street, London, UK
- 2002 "Peace and Colour Gallery" Gallery N 27, Cork Street, London, UK
- 2003 "Islington Arts Factory", Main Gallery, London, UK
- 2004 "Soviet Artists Show" Town Hall, Manchester, UK
- 2006 "Art-Manege Grafica" Tishnika 1, Moscow, Russia
- 2006 "Opt-Art" Gov.Center of Contemporary Art. Zoologicheskaya 13. Moscow, Russia
- 2006 "Caucasus Biennale Declaration" Baratashvili Street, Tbilisi, Georgia
- 2008 "New Generation" Gallery Sharden, Tbilisi, Georgia
- 2008 London Festival of Architecture, London, UK

== Personal exhibitions ==
- 2003 "Peace and Colour Gallery" Gallery 54, May Fair, London, UK
- 2005 "Gudauri" Gallery, Gudauri, Georgia
- 2005 "TMS" Gallery, Rustaveli Ave. 16, Tbilisi, Georgia
- 2006 "Positivism" Contemporary Art Museum of Russia, Petrovka 25, Moscow, Russia
- 2006 "Arbat" Georgian Cultural Center Mziuri, Arbat 42, Moscow, Russia
- 2006 "L'Arcade Chausse-Cops" Vieille-ville 16, Geneva, Switzerland
- 2006 Galerie "Ruines" Rue Des Vollandes 5, Geneva, Switzerland
- 2007 "Arci" Gallery, Abuladze Street 5, Tbilisi, Georgia
- 2007 Embassy of Georgia in The Hague, Netherlands,
- 2007 Gallery "Artstable", Amsterdam, Netherlands
- 2008 Merie de Lunel, Lunel, France,
- 2008 "L'Arcade Chausse-Coqs" Vieille-ville 16. Geneva, Switzerland
- 2008 "N Gallery & Sandro Antadze" 15 Perovskaia street. Tbilisi, Georgia
- 2008 "Embassy of Georgia in Israel" Tel Aviv, Israel,
- 2008 "N Gallery & Sandro Antadze""Christmas Exhibition" 15 Perovskaia Str. Tbilisi, Georgia
- 2009 "N Gallery & Sandro Antadze""24 Hour" Exhibition, 15 Perovskaia Str. Tbilisi, Georgia

Alexander Antadze's works are in private collections in: Georgia, Great Britain, United States, France, Switzerland and other countries.
