= Silovan Kakabadze =

Georgian sculptor (1895–1993)

Silovan Yakimovich Kakabadze (Georgian: სილოვან კაკაბაძე; 12 August 1895 – 10 June 1993) was a Soviet and Georgian sculptor and teacher. He was a rector of the Tbilisi State Academy of Arts (1936-1942).

Among his works is a collection of portraits of Georgian figures carved in the manner of Auguste Rodin. Among his pupils was Irakli Ochiauri.
