= Alexander Mrevlishvili =

Georgian painter (1866–1933)

- ალექსანდრე მრევლიშვილი
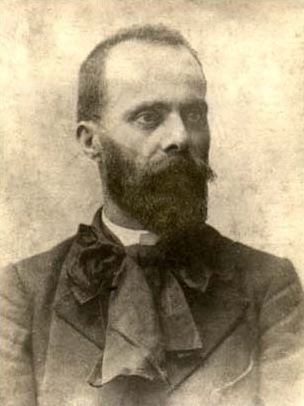
- Born: August 15, 1866; Mtskheta, Tiflis Governorate, Russian Empire
- Died: December 25, 1933 (aged 67); Tbilisi, Georgian Soviet Socialist Republic, Soviet Union
- Education: Moscow School of Painting, Sculpture and Architecture; Académie Julian
- Notable work: At the Village Chancellery (1893); Low Fence (1901)
- Children: The poet Makvala Mrevlishvili (1909–1992)

Alexander Mrevlishvili (Georgian: ალექსანდრე მრევლიშვილი; 1866–1933) was a Georgian artist who exemplified the realistic style during the transition to the 20th century." He is also seen as a representative of Georgian avant-gardism.

Mrevlishvili undertook formal artistic education at the Moscow School of Painting, Sculpture and Architecture, where he studied from 1884 to 1890. Subsequently, Mrevlishvili continued his artistic training in Paris, France, (Académie Julian), attending from 1898 to 1901. He was influenced by the art group Peredvizhniki.

His daughter Makvala Mrevlishvili (1909–1992) was a children's poet.

== Gallery ==
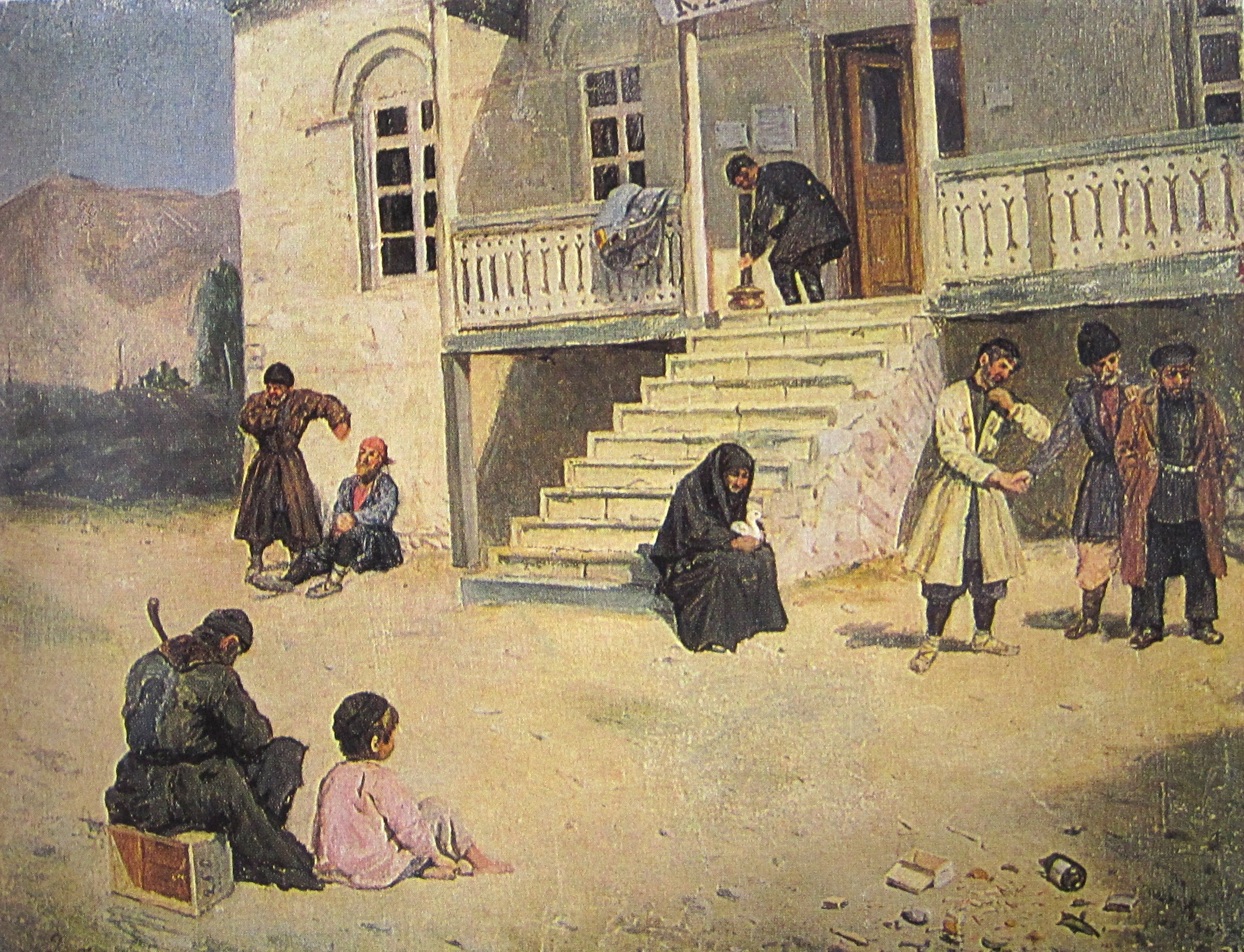
At the Village Chancellery, 1893

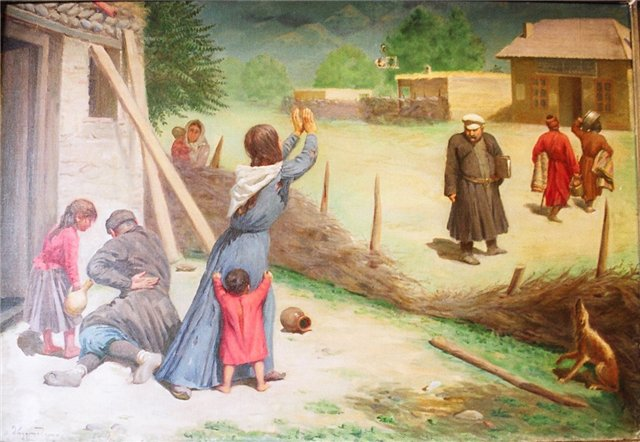
Low Fence, 1901

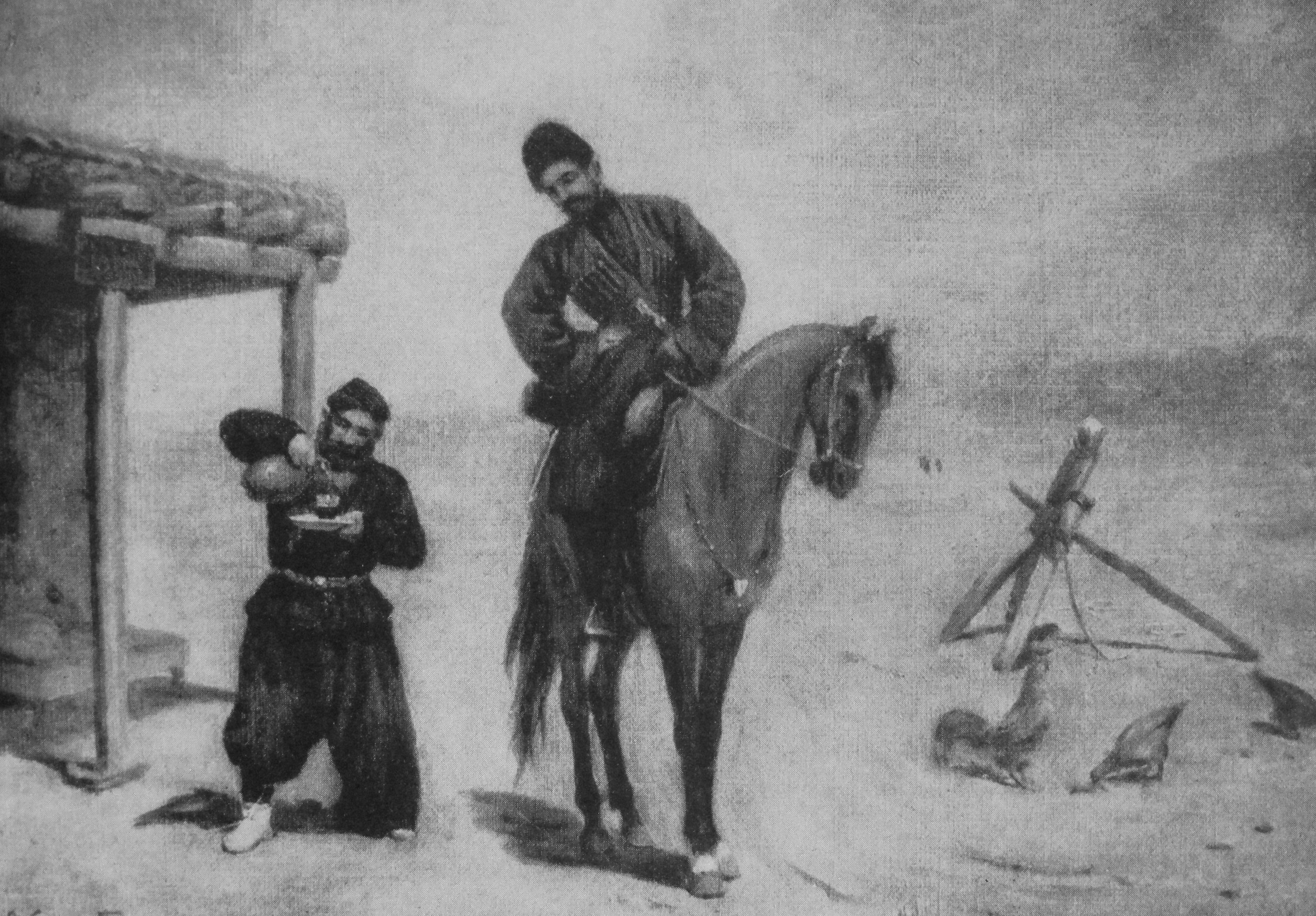
On the Road, 1903

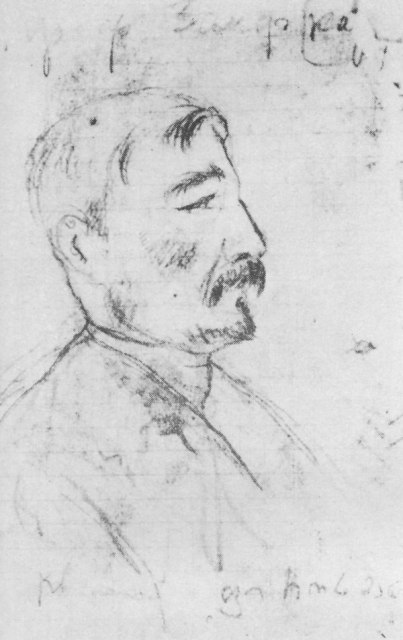
Portrait of Niko Pirosmanashvili, 1916

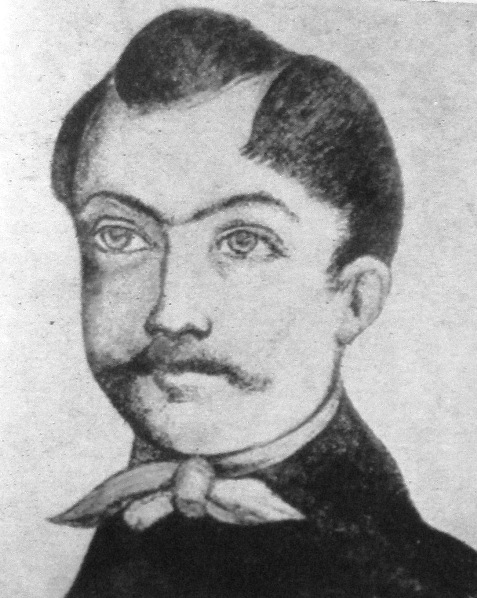
Portrait of Nikoloz Baratashvili

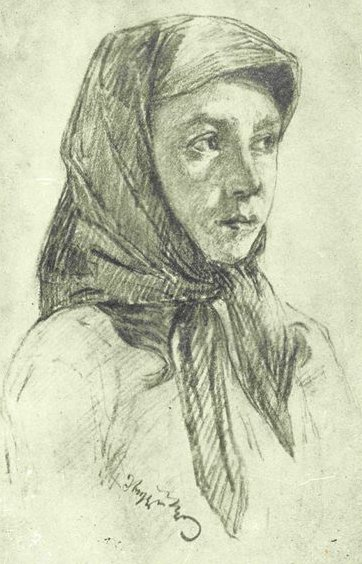
Sketch

== See also ==
- Georgian art
- Realism (art movement)
- Irakli Gamrekeli
