= Nikoloz (Koka) Ignatov =

Georgian painter

Nikoloz (Koka) Ignatov (Georgian: ნიკოლოზ (კოკა) იგნატოვი) (July 29, 1937 – May 6, 2002) was a 20th-century Georgian painter. He studied at the Tbilisi State Academy of Arts.
