= Radish Tordia =

Georgian painter

- Born: Radish Tordia; 21 August 1936 (age 89); Abasha, Georgian SSR, Soviet Union
- Education: Tbilisi Iakob Nikoladze Art College
- Known for: Painting
- Movement: Figurative art

Radish Tordia (Georgian: რადიშ თორდია) (born 21 August 1936) is a Georgian painter of figurative art. He works in oil painting, with particular emphasis on colouristic features. His preferred subject is women, who he regards as "the most beautiful creation in the world".

== Life ==
Tordia graduated from the J. Nikoladze Art Studio in Tbilisi in 1956, and then moved on to the Tbilisi State Academy of Arts, from where he graduated in 1962.

Tordia was one of the "Five Georgian Artists" who created an exhibition in Moscow in 1977. The other artists were Nana Meskhidze, Givi Narmania, Zurab Razmadze and Bezhan Shvelidze.

He has been widely lauded in his home country, where he was denoted the "Honoured Artist of Georgia" in 1979, and awarded the State Prize the following year. In 1990, he became the "People's Artist of Georgia", and was the recipient of the "Order of Honour" in 1997. He has regularly exhibited throughout Georgia and Russia since 1978, and abroad since 1980, including Tunisia, Cologne, Washington, D.C. and London.

His work can be found in the private collections of the Queen of the Netherlands, former Georgian President Eduard Shevardnadze, former German political leaders Helmut Kohl and Roman Herzog. It is also exhibited at the Georgian National Museum, the Tretyakov Gallery and the Museum of Oriental Art in Moscow, the Russian Museum in Saint Petersburg, and the Museum Ludwig in Cologne.
