= Shota and Margarita Metreveli =

Artists from Georgia

Shota Metreveli (October 25, 1913 – April 5, 1983) (Georgian: შოთა მეტრეველი) and Margarita Metreveli (June 22, 1913 – July 22, 1984) (Georgian: მარგარიტა მეტრეველი) were artists from Georgia.

== Biography ==
Shota Metreveli was a 20th-century Georgian realist artist. He was born in Borjomi on October 25, 1913 into the family of a small manufacturer. In 1927 his family moved to Tbilisi and in 1928 he met Margarita Atskvereli (later Metreveli, his wife) for the first time at their secondary school and they became friends.

Margarita Metreveli was born in Tbilisi on June 22, 1913 into a family of a blacksmiths called Atskvereli. Their meeting in 1928 was the beginning of a long creative partnership based on mutual passion for art and lasted over 50 years until their deaths in the 1980s.

In 1938 they both graduated from the Tbilisi State Academy of Arts, where they studied under Professor Mose Toidze, the Georgian artist and academician. Their other teachers were Iosif Sharleman, David Kakabadze and Lado Gudiashvili. From 1939 they both took part in numerous group exhibitions in Georgia and other parts of the former Soviet Union.

In 1944 after their first independent exhibition at the Tbilisi Picture Gallery (today the Blue Gallery) their chosen artistic paths became classical and socialist realism. The main source of their inspiration was native Georgia.

Like most artists whose creative development fell into the Soviet era, both Shota and Margarita Metreveli were influenced by the leading ideology of the time. Themes of mass construction, industrial landscapes, collective farms and farmers, war heroes and heroes of (socialist) labour, young patriots at the forefront of the motherland were predominant throughout their careers. Their creative output is varied: portraiture, still lives, historic themes, Georgia’s relationship with Russia, etc.

Both Shota and Margarita Metreveli were the professors at the Tbilisi State Academy of Arts. They received the titles of Merited Artists of Georgian SSR for their contribution to the cultural heritage. Their works are kept in state museums in Georgia, as well as in private collections in Russia, Europe and the US.

Shota Metreveli died on April 5, 1983. Margarita Metreveli died on July 22, 1984. They are buried alongside each other in Mukhatgverdi cemetery near Tbilisi. They were survived by their only son, Merab Metreveli, a talented Georgian sculptor, poet and musician.
