= Irakli Ochiauri =

Georgian painter and sculptor

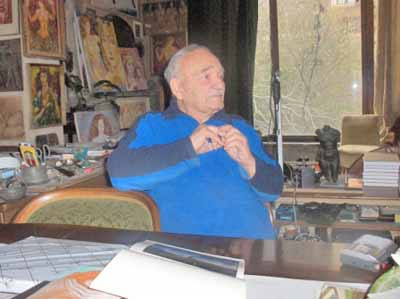
Irakli Ochiauri, 2009

Irakli Ochiauri (Georgian: ირაკლი ოჩიაური, Russian: Иракли Очиаури; November 20, 1924 – December 4, 2015) was a Georgian painter and sculptor who was awarded the Shota Rustaveli State Prize, the highest prize in Georgia in the fields of art and literature.

Ochiauri was born in Tbilisi. From 1945 to 1951 he studied at the Tbilisi State Academy of Arts on the faculty of Sculpture first with professor Silovan Kakabadze and then with Iakob Nikoladze.

His dissertation was devoted to Vazha Pshavela. He participated in exhibitions from 1953. His first work, the portrait of Marine Kubaneishvili attracted attention when it was exhibited in Moscow and, thanks to this, Irakli Ochiauri became a member of the Union of Soviet Artists.

In the same 1953 Irakli Ochiauri exhibited his first embossing - Portrait of Iakob Nikoladze that is considered as the renaissance of the new Georgian Art of coining..

From 1952 to 1962, he worked alone in restoration and foundation of new face of the field of repoussé. At the same time Ochiauri did not forget about sculpture too.

He was the author of the sculpture of pearl divers in Pitsunda, bronze monuments of Alexandre Kazbegi in Kazbegi and Vazha Pshavela in Dusheti. In addition to coining and sculpture he works in the fields of graphic arts and painting.

Ochiauri was a People's Artist of Georgia and a Professor of the Georgian Polytechnic University. He participated at World Exhibitions of Montreal, Canada and Osaka, Japan and had personal exhibitions in Norway, Austria, both the then West and East Germany, Syria, Belgium, Jordan and Japan.
