= Simon Kldiashvili =

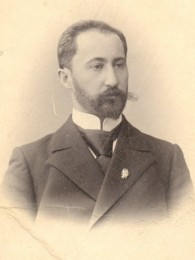
- Born: 1865
- Died: 1920
- Occupation: Architect

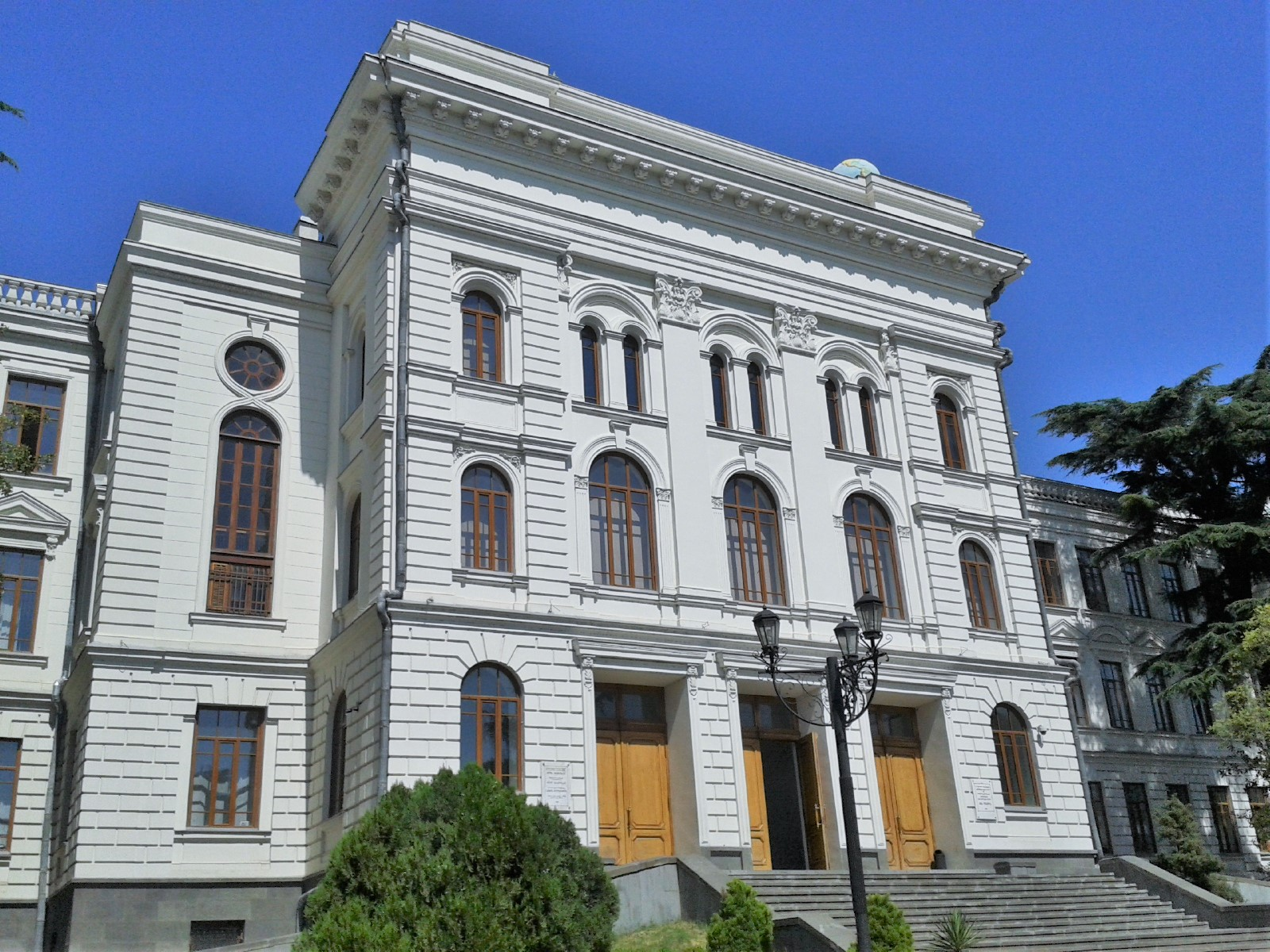
Tbilisi State University. Architect: S. Kldiashvili, 1899–1906.

Simon Kldiashvili (Georgian: სიმონ კლდიაშვილი; 2 February 1865 – 26 May 1920) was a Georgian architect best known for his eclectic projects in Tbilisi, including a college building which, in 1918, became the Tbilisi State University. He was one of the leading figures in the Georgian Art Nouveau movement.

== Family ==
Kldiashvili was born in a Georgian noble family in the city of Kutaisi, then part of the Russian Empire. His father, Grigol Kldiashvili, was a Russian army officer and his mother, Eprosine Kldiashvili (née Kipiani) was a journalist and theatre actress and a niece of the Georgian intellectual Dimitri Kipiani. His younger brothers, Alexander and Andria, were pioneering chemist and electrical engineer, respectively. His sister, Mariam, was an opera singer. His other sister, Nino, was a paternal grandmother of the popular actor Dodo Abashidze.

== Career ==
Simon Kldiashvili graduated from an arts college in Moscow in 1895 and briefly pursued a private practice as an architect in the Kostroma Governorate before moving to Sukhumi as the town's chief architect in 1896. At the invitation of the Georgian nobility, Kldiashvili designed the Georgian Nobility Gymnasium in Tbilisi, which now houses the principal unit of Tbilisi State University, in 1899 and supervised its construction until 1906. He authored several eclectic and art nouveau edifices in downtown Tbilisi, and refurbished, in 1902, the mansion of Princes Kobulashvili, now the Tbilisi State Academy of Arts. Furthermore, he accompanied the archeologist Ekvtime Takaishvili in his expeditions to Tao-Klarjeti in 1902 and Racha-Lechkhumi in 1910. He died in 1920 and is buried at the Didube Pantheon in Tbilisi.
