= The Literature Express =

2009 novel by Lasha Bugadze

- Author: Lasha Bugadze
- Original title: ლიტერატურული ექსპრესი
- Translator: Maya Kiasashvili
- Language: Georgian
- Series: Georgian Literature Series
- Genre: Novel Satire novel, Grotesque
- Publisher: Dalkey Archive Press
- Publication date: 2009 2014 in English.
- Publication place: Georgia
- Media type: Print (paperback)
- Pages: 330 pages
- ISBN: 978-1564787262

The Literature Express (Georgian: ლიტერატურული ექსპრესი) is a novel written by Lasha Bugadze in 2009. It was translated by Maya Kiasashvili in 2014. Novel published in Saudi Arabia in 2015 (إكسبريس الأدب - by الكتب خان للنشر والتوزيع).

== About a novel ==
"The Literature Express is at its best when embracing the literary cacophony of its setting. The characters and their furious battle to out-do one another professionally gives the book its bleak humor, and a degree of uneasy edge (...) Maya Kisashvili's translation is utterly elegant and succeeds in conveying outlandish guffaw-worthy humor without ever sounding mannered."–Tweed's Magazine
