= Sargis Kakabadze =

Georgian historian (1886–1967)

Sargis Kakabadze

Sargis N. Kakabadze (Georgian: სარგის ნესტორის ძე კაკაბაძე; October 7, 1886 – April 2, 1967) was a Georgian historian and philologist, Doctor of Historical Sciences, Professor. He was one of the founders of the National Archives of Georgia.

He was born in 1886, in a small village Kukhi (Imereti region of Western Georgia). In 1910 he graduated from the Faculty of Oriental Languages of the St.Petersburg University (Russia). In 1911-1918 he was a teacher of History of the Georgian Gymnasium of Tbilisi, in 1919-1967 Professor of the Tbilisi State University (TSU), in 1921-1926 Director of the State Historical Archive of Georgia, in 1945-1961 head of the Department of the Old Acts of this Archive.

Main fields of scientific activity of Sargis Kakabadze were: history of Georgia, source studies of the history of Georgia and the Caucasus, history of Georgian literature, Rustvelology (Shota Rustaveli was a great Georgian poet of the 12th century), etc. He was author of more than 100 scientific-research articles and many important monographs.

Sargis Kakabadze died in 1967, in Tbilisi.

== Selected works ==
- "Character of the feudal system in Georgia of the end of Middle Ages" (a monograph), Tbilisi, 1912 (in Russian).
- "About the Georgian historians of the 11th century" (a monograph), Tbilisi, 1912 (in Russian).
- "Social-economic questions of Georgia of the Middle Ages" (a monograph), Tbilisi, 1927 (in Russian).
- "Vakhtang Gorgasali" (a monograph), Tbilisi, 1959 (in Georgian).
- "Rustaveli and his poem "The Knight in the Panther's Skin"" (a monograph), Tbilisi, 1966 (in Georgian).
- Kakabadze S., Queen Tamar: Her Significance, translated by Michael P. Willis, 2017.
