= Rustaveli Cinema =

Movie theater in Tbilisi, Georgia

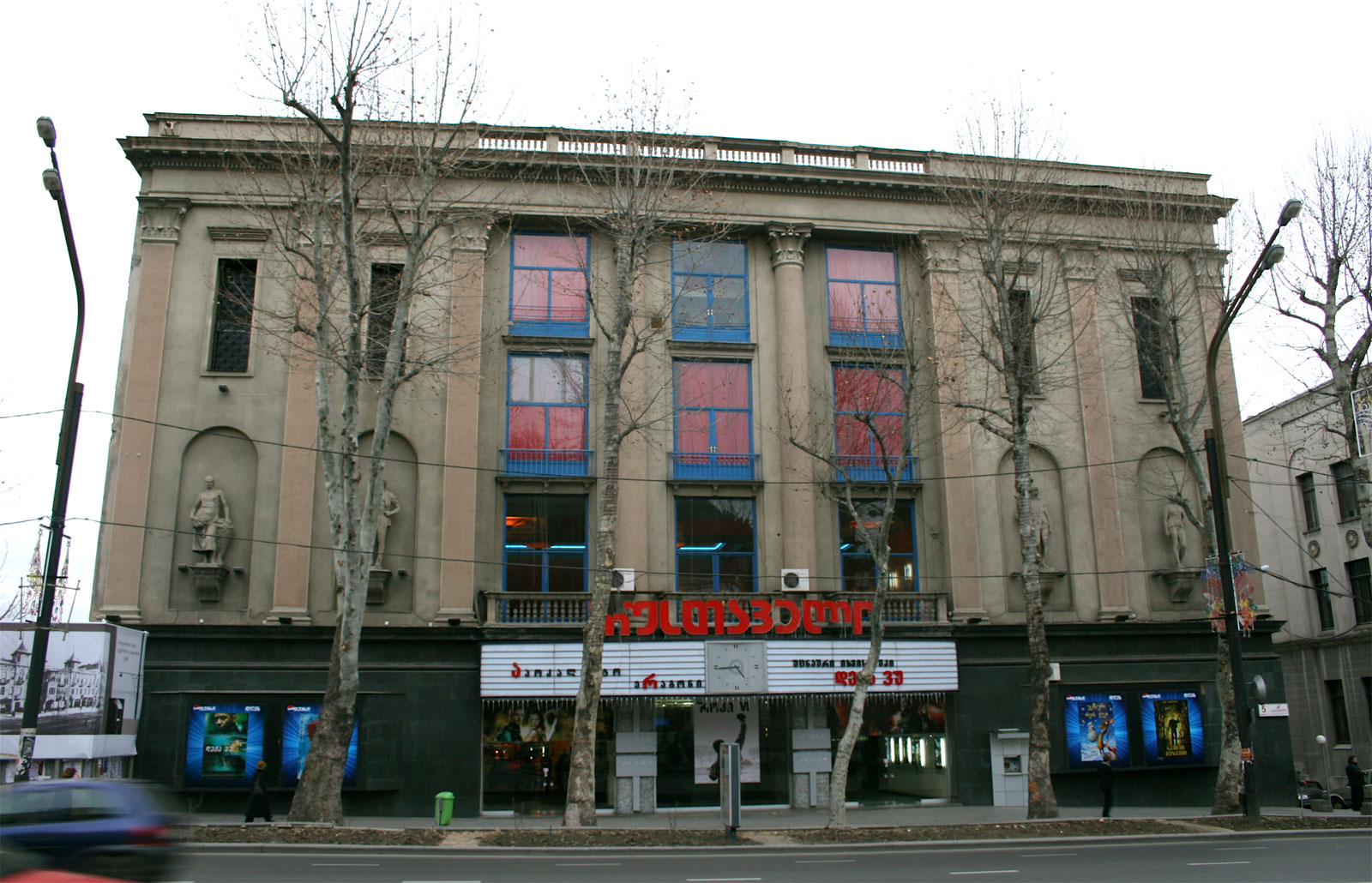
- Front view of Cinema Rustaveli
- Interactive map of Rustaveli Cinema
- Location: 5 Rustaveli Avenue, Tbilisi
- Coordinates: 41.696667°N 44.799722°E
- Capacity: 415
- Type: Movie theater

Construction
- Opened: 1939
- Renovated: 1999

The Rustaveli Cinema (Georgian: კინოთეატრი რუსთაველი) is a movie theater in Tbilisi. The theater is on Rustaveli Avenue opposite the Parliament of Georgia. The theater was opened in 1939 and had originally a seating capacity of 1200 people. It was designed by the architect Nikolay Severov in the style of Stalinist architecture, and has sculptures by Valentin Topuridze and Shota Mikatadze representing different social groups in vaulted niches at the second floor level. The building has four floors and is a cuboid. The first floor is rusticated whereas the upper floors are structured by Corinthian pilasters. The top of the building is rendered as an overhanging cornice. In 1999 the Rustaveli cinema was renovated and reopened on 11 July 1999 with 415 seats. It shows mostly first-run blockbuster films and has on average 1000 visitors per day.

== Bibliography ==
- საქართველოს ძველი ქალაქები: თბილისი (Ancient towns of Georgia: Tbilisi) (Second ed.). 2006. ISBN 99940-0-923-0.
