= Shukhuti =

Coordinates: 42°05′N 42°05′E

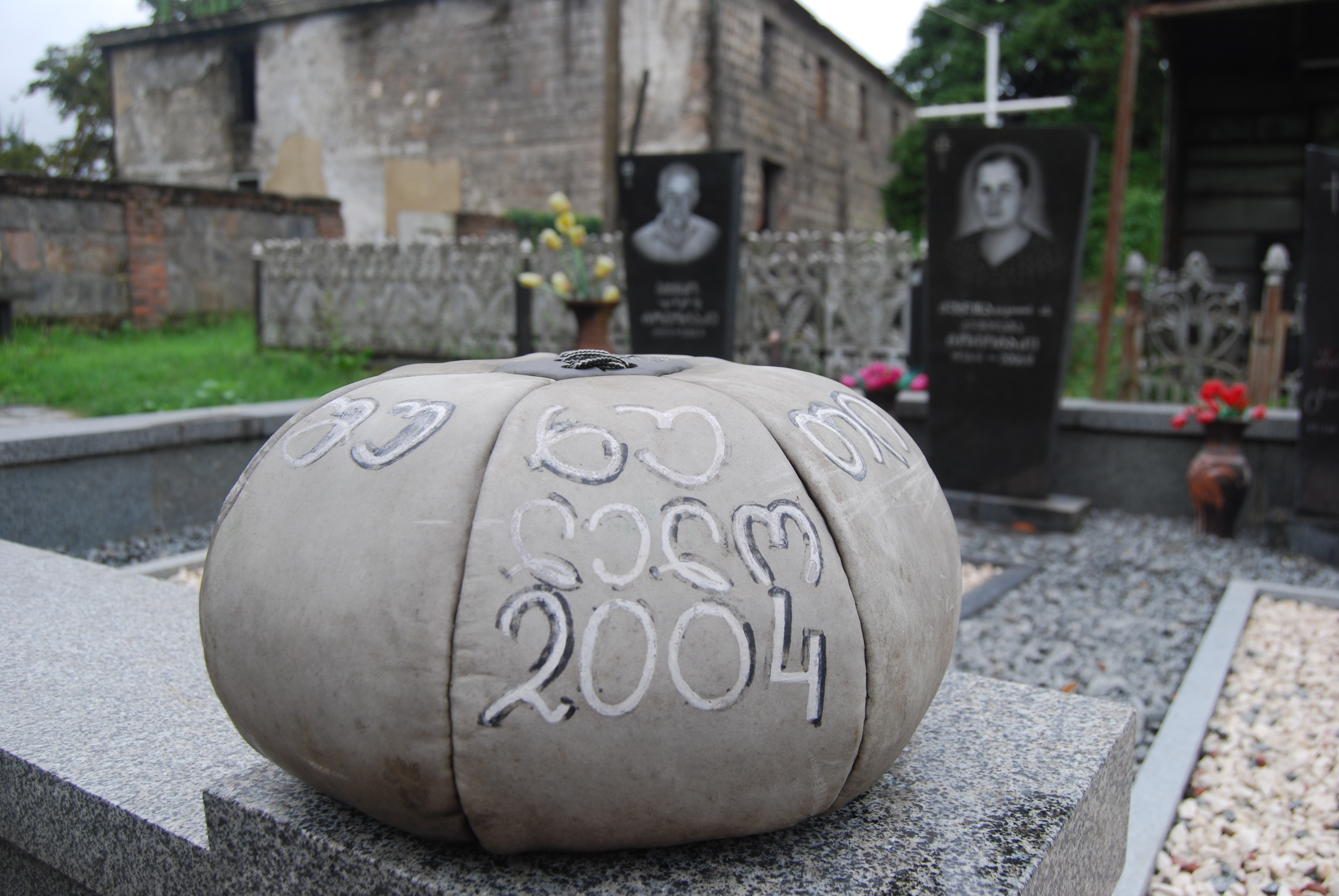
A Lelo burti ball at the Shukhuti cemetery

Shukhuti (Georgian: შუხუთი) is a village community near Lanchkhuti, Guria, Georgia, which includes the villages of Zemo Shukhuti and Kvemo Shukhuti. The area produces limestone, which is used for making lime.

== History ==
The area has been inhabited since antiquity. A Roman villa with a bath mosaic, the Shukhuti mosaic, was discovered here during excavations in 1961. The inhabitants have been Christians since the 5th or 6th centuries. A castle was located there at that time. The name "Shukhuti" is first recorded in the 1708 documents. According to tradition, it originated from the Turks, who called this place ukhuti ("impossible").

In 1855, during the Crimean War, the Battle of Nigoiti (ნიგოითის ბრძოლა) was fought nearby between the Russian and Ottoman forces.

== Lelo ==
Shukhutis play a type of rugby, called Lelo every Easter to commemorate the battle. The President of Georgia visited the village in 2012 to watch the game.

== See also ==
- Shukhuti mosaic
- Guria
