= Nana Meskhidze =

Georgian artist

- Born: 1936; Tbilisi
- Died: August 31, 1997 (aged 60–61); Tbilisi

Nana Meskhidze (Georgian: ნანა მესხიძე; 13 March 1936 – 31 August 1997), was an artist of Georgia. She participated in many exhibitions.

== Biography ==
Meskhidze was born on 13 March 1936 in Tbilisi. Her father was Archil Meskhidze who was the conductor of the Georgian folk music choir and his mother was Anna Avlokhashvili, an artist with the Marjanishvili Theater. In 1944 she went to Ilia Chavchavadze Women's High School and in 1951 she started her studies with Iakob Nikoladze at the art school in Tbilisi. In 1957 she studied at the Tbilisi Academy of Fine Arts.

In 1963 Meskhidze left and began participating in exhibitions where the main theme of her works are Сhildren and Motherhood. In 1965 she became a member of USSR Union of Artists and in 1977 she was an honoured artist of the Georgian republic. Meskhidze was one of the "Five Georgian Artists" who created an exhibition in Moscow in 1977. The other artists were Radish Tordia, Givi Narmania, Zurab Razmadze and Bezhan Shvelidze.

Meskhidze has paintings in museums of the Georgia and Russian Federation. Meskhidze died on August 31, 1997, in Tbilisi.

== Works ==
- "Brother and Sister" (1963)
- "My Father" (1965)
- "Play" (1965)
- "Four of Them" (1966)
- "Girls" (1967)
- "Mothers" (1968)
- "Birth" (1969)
- "Day of Victory" (1970)
- "Children at the Beach" (1971)
- "Tennis Player Girls" (1971)
- "Self Portrait with Children" (1973)
- "In Museum" (1975)
- "In the Field (Idyll)" (1975)

== Exhibitions and creative trips ==
- 1963 - Exhibition attributed to International Women's Day
- 1966 - Exhibition of young artist's artworks in Tbilisi National Gallery
- 1967 - Second all-union exhibition "Training and sport in art works"
- 1967 - Exhibition of soviet art works in Japan
- 1968 - Creative trip in Romania
- 1968 - World festival of Youngs and Students in Sofia
- 1968 - "Young artists of USSR" exhibition in German Democratic Republic
- 1968 - "Young artists of USSR" exhibition in Hungary
- 1977 - Painting exhibition of Five Georgian Artists in Moscow
- 1977 - Painting exhibition of Five Georgian Artists in Iraq
- 1978 - Painting exhibition of Five Georgian Artists in Syria
- 1978 - Creative trip of Special Group of Artist in Italy and Malta
- 1978 - Creative trip of Special Group of Artist in German Democratic Republic
- 1979 - Creative trip in Baltic
- 1979 - International Symposium of Five Democratic Countries Artists in Prague
- 1982 - Creative trip in Finland
- 1983 - Personal exhibition in Tbilisi Triumphal Center
- 1990 - Creative trip and two exhibitions in Palanga, Lithuania

== Bibliography ==
- L. Khakhmigerashvili - Spring colors invite ("Tbilisi" newspaper, March 15, 1963)
- ”On Guard for Peace” visual art exhibition of Georgia (Catalogue. Tbilisi, 1965)
- "On Guard for Peace" national exhibition (Catalogue. "Sovetski khudozhnik", Moscow, 1965)
- Nana Meskhidze (Booklet. ”Khelovneba”, Tbilisi, 1973)
- 30 anniversary of great victory (Catalogue. Tbilisi, 1975)
- V. Beridze, N. Ezerskaya - Art of Soviet Georgia. 1921-1970 (Moscow, 1975)
- Grigor Parusidze - Only heart I expanse for You ("Druzhba narodov" magazine, #2, 1975)
- "Glory to Labor" the National Exhibition (Catalogue. "Sovetski khudozhnik", Moscow, 1976)
- Otar Egadze - Among the Artists (Tbilisi, 1976)
- Painting Exhibition of Five Georgian Artists (Catalogue. Moscow, 1977)
- Moris Potskhishvili - Grace of Maternity ("Saqartvelos qali" magazine, №1, 1983)
- PALANGA 90 (Catalogue. 1990)
