= Gia Bugadze =

Georgian artist

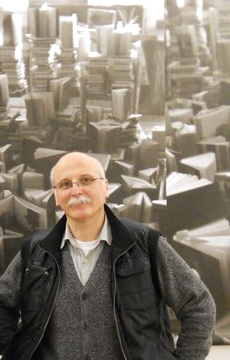
- Gia Bugadze in front of his artwork. Tbilisi State Academy of Arts. Dec. 2010
- Born: September 24, 1956 (age 69); Tbilisi, Georgia
- Education: Tbilisi State Academy of Arts
- Known for: painting, graphic, mural

Gia Bugadze (Georgian: გია ბუღაძე; born September 24, 1956 ) is a Georgian artist. He was the Rector of the Tbilisi State Academy of Arts from 2003 to 2012.

== Early life and education ==
Gia (Giorgi) Bugadze was born on September 24, 1956, in one of the old city areas of Tbilisi, Georgia, to a family of doctors. From an early age, he showed interest in art. He acquired a classical education in the Georgian Soviet Socialist Republic. He studied at the Palace of Pioneers and Pupils, then at the Tbilisi Iakob Nikoladze Art College and finally at the Tbilisi State Academy of Arts (1977–1981), the Studio of Giorgi Totibadze and Koki Makharadze at the Faculty of Fine Arts. In 1985, he studied at the USSR Art Academy and graduated there, under headship of Ucha Japaridze.

== Life and career ==
He acknowledges his teacher to be the well-known Georgian artist Jibson Khundadze. The power of color, absorbed from him, was applied for a task of an artwork improvement, it was transformed and was established in its individual style, characterized by composition with live dramatics, audacity of the mastered art-piece. He has realized various personal exhibitions in Vatican- Rome, Basel, Zurich, Prague, Köln, Tallinn, Munich, Berlin, Moscow, Palermo, Barcelona, Paris, Cannes, New York, London, as well as participated in group exhibitions, international projects, and as a speaker - in international symposiums, forums, round tables and conferences (The George Washington University, Thomas Jefferson University - USA, Basel University-Switzerland.

At the end of Millennium, he turned towards educational activity. He joined the Tbilisi State Academy of Arts, initially as a teacher, later as the Dean of the Faculty of Fine Arts, and lastly as the Rector of the academy, between 2003 and 2012.

- "I am the professional artist, I am the professional teacher, I am the professional listener, I am the professional reader. As for me, the books and music are the same, that the buildings are for the city. Without them, art isn’t being created in my inward, that’s why, through my art, I have been the musician, writer, teacher and also, the artist" - Gia Bugadze. 2012

== Personal life ==
The general characteristics of cultural circumstances of post-totalitarian countries completely affected the Georgian arts too. In these conditions, “survival” of an artist, detecting the identification point with the reality and mainly, self-realization, showed up in searching, appeared to be a hard problem. He was always supported by his spouse - a like-minded person, an art historian Ani kldiashvili. He has two children, Nino Bugadze-an architect and Lasha Bugadze- writer and dramatist, representative of the new Georgian culture.

== Awards ==
He has been awarded many Prizes at various contests: in 1985 – Best Artwork of the Year – major Prize of the contest, held by Georgian Union of Artists; five years later - Prize of the President of France for the Best National Collection, at the International Festival in Cannes, France; in 1993 – Medal of Iakob Gogebashvili, awarded by Georgian Educators Association and Medal of Anton Catholicos (Anton II of Georgia); in 2001 – Medal of the Ivane Javakhishvili Tbilisi State University; in 2002 of Vatican “Carolus Magnus”.

== Artwork ==
Sea boarding - house Piazza arch, Batumi Georgia. 2010

Gia Bugadze achieved early fame with the series of paintings called “Life of Kartli” (in different words History of Georgia). Since then, he often painted mythological characters, and their ‘appearance – or, ‘embodiment, or reincarnation feels as almost mystical.

Murals give full scope to his imagination, that appeals with complicated and large-scale compositions. In 2010, in Batumi, he painted the Piazza arch “Sea boarding - house”.

He has realized a wide range of mural projects in the temples and secular buildings: Church of Martin Luther in Berlin, and St. Nino Georgian Church in Paris; the library and conference hall of the Tbilisi State University, the conference halls of the Ilia State University and of the Georgian Technical University; the City Hall chamber; the “Kings Chamber” of the Georgian Parliament, the Hall of the Ministry of Justice of Georgia; apartment of Claudio Berlinjieri in Rome; the “Chamber of Freedom of Speech ‘ at the Louisiana State University, United States; artistic panel “Tbilisi’. His fantasies through various media are turning up in an interesting form.

== Bibliography ==
- თბილისის სახელმწიფო სამხატვრო აკადემია (The Tbilisi State Academy of Arts). Tbilisi 2011.ISBN 978-9941-0-3304-9.
