= Karaman Kutateladze =

Georgian artist

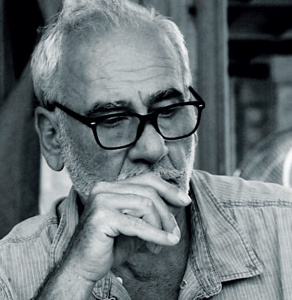
Karaman Kutateladze

Karaman Kutateladze (Georgian: ყარამან ქუთათელაძე; born April 21, 1959, Tbilisi, Georgian SSR, USSR) is a Georgian artist. He has served as the Rector of the Tbilisi State Academy of Arts since 2022.
