= Levan Lagidze =

Georgian painter

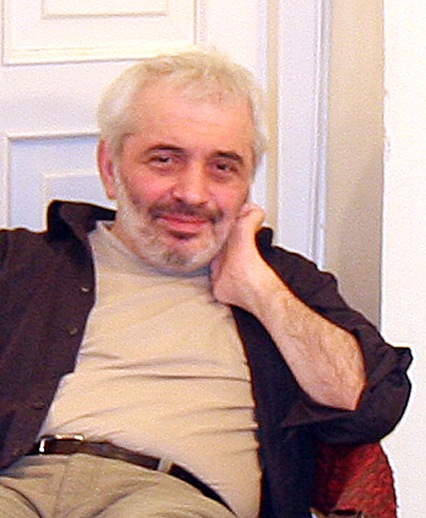
Levan Lagidze in his Tbilisi apartment, in 2008. Photo by Mikhail Evstafiev

Levan Lagidze (Georgian: ლევან ლაღიძე; (born 1958, Tbilisi) is a prominent Georgian painter.

He graduated from the Tbilisi State Academy of Arts.

Lagidze's paintings are in the collections of the Tretyakov Gallery and the Modern Art Museum in Moscow, Russia; the National Picture Gallery in Tbilisi, Georgia; the Zimmerli Art Museum, Rutgers University, NJ, US; the Gertsev Gallery; and the TMS Gallery in Tbilisi, Georgia.

His works are also in private collections in Belgium, Canada, France, Georgia, Germany, Italy, Netherlands, Norway, Russia, South Africa, UK, the US and the Czech Republic.

== Group exhibitions ==
- 2007 - Artbull Gallery, London, UK
- 2004 – Silent Auction to benefit the American Friends of Georgia – Doyle, New York, US
- 1998 – ART SALON’98, Moscow, Russia
- 1997 – “Going back”, TMS Art Gallery, Tbilisi, Georgia
- 1996 – Galerie Seidel am Domhof, Cologne, Germany
- 1994 – “The Beginning”, CA Global AC, Vienna, Austria
- 1994 – Georgian Art, Steiner Haus, Bonn, Germany
- 1993 – Georgian Art, Riviera Gallery, London, UK
- 1990 – Georgian School – Drouot Auction, Paris, France
- 1986 – Retrospective of Georgian Art, Central House of Artists, Moscow, Russia

== Solo exhibitions ==
- 2019 - Zurcher Gallery by Katrine Levin Galleries, New York, NY, United States
- 2018 - La Galleria Pall Mall by Katrine Levin Galleries, London, UK
- 2008 - Chardin Art Gallery, Tbilisi, Georgia
- 2007 - Chardin Art Gallery, Tbilisi, Georgia
- 2006, 2005, 2004, 1998, 1995 – TMS Gallery, Tbilisi, Georgia
- 1994 – Central House of Artists, presented by Gertsev Gallery, Moscow, Russia
- 1990 – Georgian Center of Culture “Mziuri”, Moscow, Russia
- 1989 – House of Artists, Tbilisi, Georgia
