= Shukhuti mosaic =

- შუხუთის მოზაიკა (Georgian)
- Location within Guria Location within Georgia
- 42°05′N 42°05′E
- Type: Roman mosaic
- Periods: Late Antiquity
- Location: Shukhuti, Guria, Georgia
- Region: South Caucasus
- Part of: Eastern Roman Empire

The Shukhuti mosaic (Georgian: შუხუთის მოზაიკა, shukhutis mozaika) is a bath mosaic discovered in 1961 at the village of Shukhuti, Guria, western Georgia. It dates from the 4th-5th century, from the times of the historical entity of Lazica.

== Description ==
Equal to the size of the mosaic floors discovered in the bath Shukhuti's apodyterium (2.00X3, 50 m). The mosaic-covered area is approximately 50%, which was still under a fifteen-centimeter layer of lime mixed with dapshkhvnil ceramics, and scattered cobblestones. The mosaic was made using the Opus Tesselatum technique, which is characterized by the use of identical size and shape of cubes. Cubic surfaces have dimensions of about 1 cm. The mosaic is made of the following materials:

1. black sandstone
2. white, yellow, lime green colors
3. Andesite, dark red, sometimes brown
4. pale red ceramics.

The design is of squares and eight-pointed stars.
