= David Kakabadze =

Georgian set designer and artist (1889–1952)

Davit Kakabadze
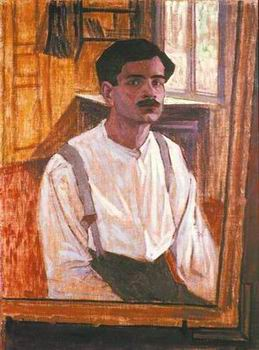
- David Kakabadze. Self-portrait in the mirror. 1913.
- Born: 20 August 1889; Khoni
- Died: 10 May 1952 (aged 62)
- Occupations: theatre scenic artist; artist

Davit Kakabadze (Georgian: დავით კაკაბაძე; 20 August 1889 – 10 May 1952) was a leading Georgian avant-garde painter, graphic artist and scenic designer. A multi-talent, he was also an art scholar and innovator in the field of cinematography as well as an amateur photographer. Kakabadze's works are notable for combining innovative interpretation of European "Leftist" art with Georgian national traditions, on which he was an expert.

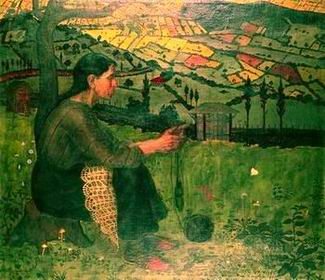
Imeretia - My Mother. 1918

Kakabadze was born into a poor peasant family in the village of Kukhi near the town of Khoni. Sponsored by local philanthropists, he studied natural sciences at St. Petersburg University from which he graduated in 1916. At the same time, he attended painting classes at the studio of Dmitroyev-Kavkazsky and did a research in old Georgian arts. After a brief period of working as a painter and educator in Tbilisi, he went to Paris where he lived from 1919 to 1927. He partook in the Société des Artistes Indépendants exhibitions and joint exhibitions with the Georgian artists Lado Gudiashvili and Shalva Kikodze. The cycle of landscapes reproducing the nature of Kakabadze's native province of Imereti is some of the most interesting of his early works. During his stay in Paris, Kakabadze was attracted by "subjectless painting", and worked on problems of pictorial technique, occasionally using metal, mirror glass, stained glass and other such materials in place of paints. He soon went over to an even more "Leftist" position, and paid generous tribute to cubism. He lectured on various aspects of visual arts in Paris and, developing his interest in kinetic form, in 1923 he constructed a film camera that produced the illusion of relief and thus became one of the pioneers of three-dimensional cinema. By the mid-1920s he had rejected his cubist-influenced style in favor of more abstract sculpture and painting.

Having returned to Georgia in 1927, Kakabadze continued his Imereti themes in new monumental decorative landscapes, including industrial landscapes. Around the same time, he collaborated with the leading Georgian theatre director Kote Marjanishvili to produce several set designs for Marjanishvili's theatre in Kutaisi. In 1931 he also produced a documental film "The Old Monuments of Georgia".

Kakabadze became a professor at the Tbilisi State Academy of Arts in 1928, but came under pressure from Soviet authorities for "failure" to abandon Formalism and adapt to the dogmas of Social realism. Eventually, he was dismissed from the Academy in 1948.

== See also ==
- Sargis Kakabadze, Davit Kakabadze's brother and historian.
