= Gigo Gabashvili =

Georgian painter and educator (1862–1936)

Gigo Gabashvili Гиго Габашвили
- Giorgy "Gigo" Gabashvili
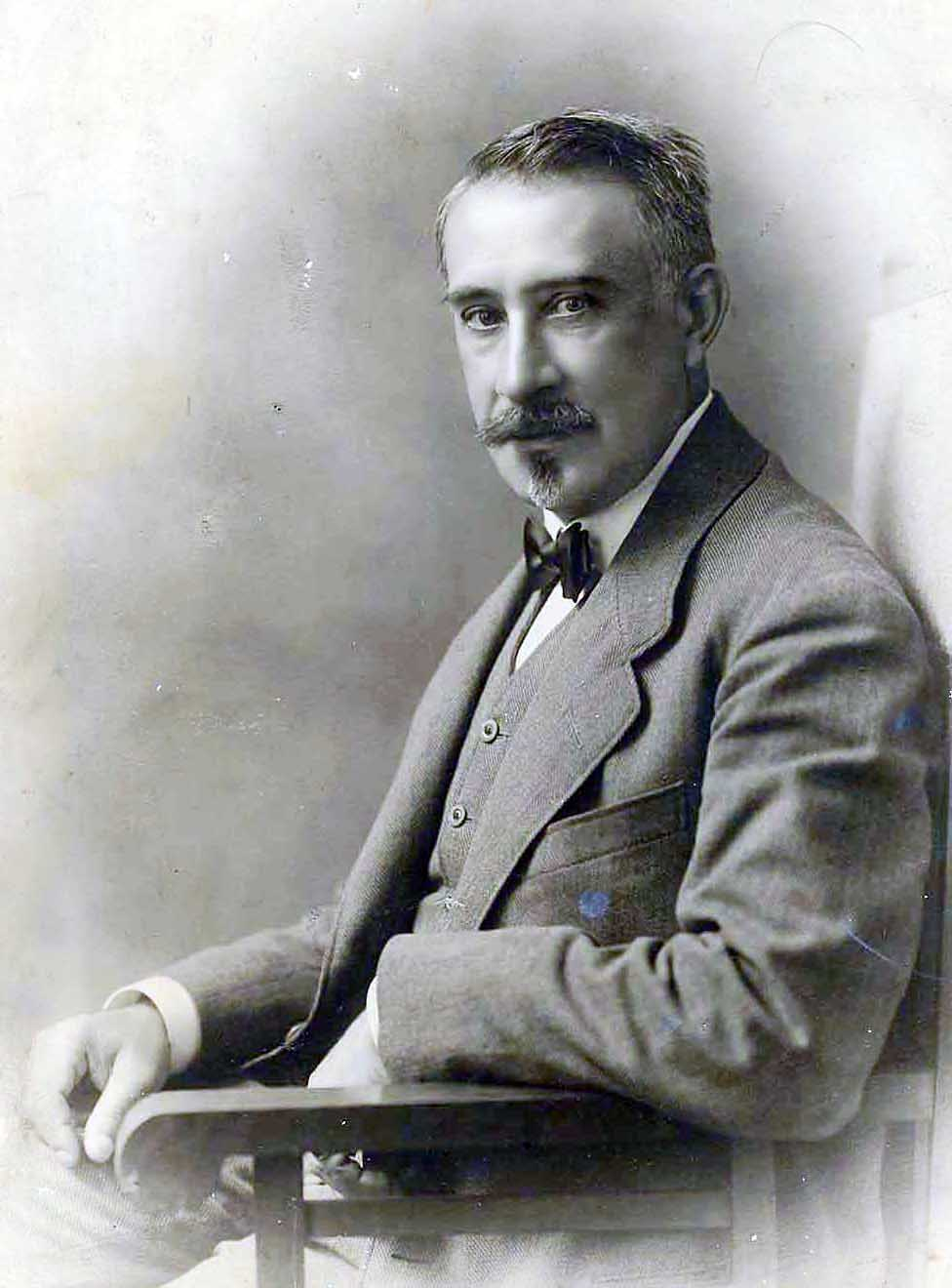
- Gabashvili, c. early 1900s
- Born: November 9, 1862; Tiflis, Georgia, Russian Empire
- Died: October 28, 1936 (aged 73); Tsikhisdziri, Kobuleti Municipality, Soviet Union
- Education: Imperial Academy of Arts; Munich Academy of Fine Arts
- Movement: Realism, Orientalism

Giorgi "Gigo" Ivanes dze Gabashvili (Georgian: გიორგი [გიგო] ივანეს ძე გაბაშვილი) (November 9, 1862 – October 28, 1936) was a Georgian painter and educator. One of the earliest Georgian representatives of the Realist School of Georgian painting, his work is known for covering a wide range of subjects, landscapes and scenes of everyday life through orientalist lens. Although not widely known in the West, Gabashvili's paintings are highly valued - the artist's late 19th century painting The Bazaar in Samarkand, originally commissioned by Charles Richard Crane, sold for $1.36 million dollars at Christie's in 2006.

== Biography ==
Born in Tbilisi, Georgia (then part of the Russian Empire), Gabashvili was educated at the Imperial Academy of Arts (1886–1888) and the Munich Academy of Fine Arts (1894–1897). Returning to his homeland, he made a debut as the first artist to have been honored with a solo exhibition in Tbilisi. From 1900 to 1920, he taught at the art school operated by the Caucasus Society for Promotion of Fine Arts. Gabashvili was one of the founding professors of the Tbilisi State Academy of Arts (1922) and was granted the title People's Illustrator of the Georgian SSR (1929). He taught among others Apollon Kutateladze and Elene Akhvlediani. Gabashvili remained a staunch realist and made known his opposition to left-wing art. He died in Tsikhisdziri, Kobuleti Municipality, Georgia, in 1936.

== Works ==
Gigo Gabashvili is best known for his series of vivid portraits of peasants, townsmen, and noblemen ("The Three Townsmen", 1893; "The Sleeping Khevsur", 1898; "The Drunk Khevsur", 1899; "A Kurd", 1903–1909; "The Three Generals", 1910; etc.) as well as multifigure scenes from Georgian ("Alaverdoba Festival", 1899) and Oriental life – many of them based on the sketches of his Central Asian journey in 1894 ("The Bazaar in Samarkand", 1894–1897; "The Divan-Bey Pool in Bukhara", 1897; etc.). Most of his works are now on display at the National Museum of Fine Arts in Tbilisi. His 1895 copy of "The Bazaar in Samarkand," created at the request of the U.S. diplomat and businessman Charles R. Crane who met him during his travel in the Caucasus, was sold for USD 1.36 million at Christie’s in 2006.

== Gallery ==
The Bazaar in Samarkand, c. 1890s

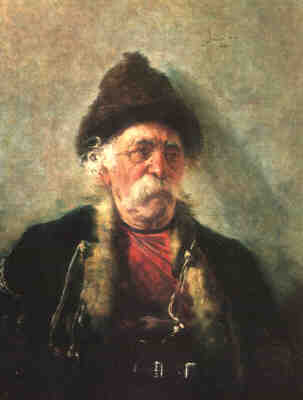
Old Citizen, c. 1890s

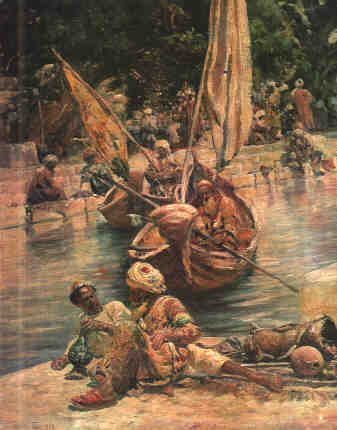
The Bukharians, c. 1890s

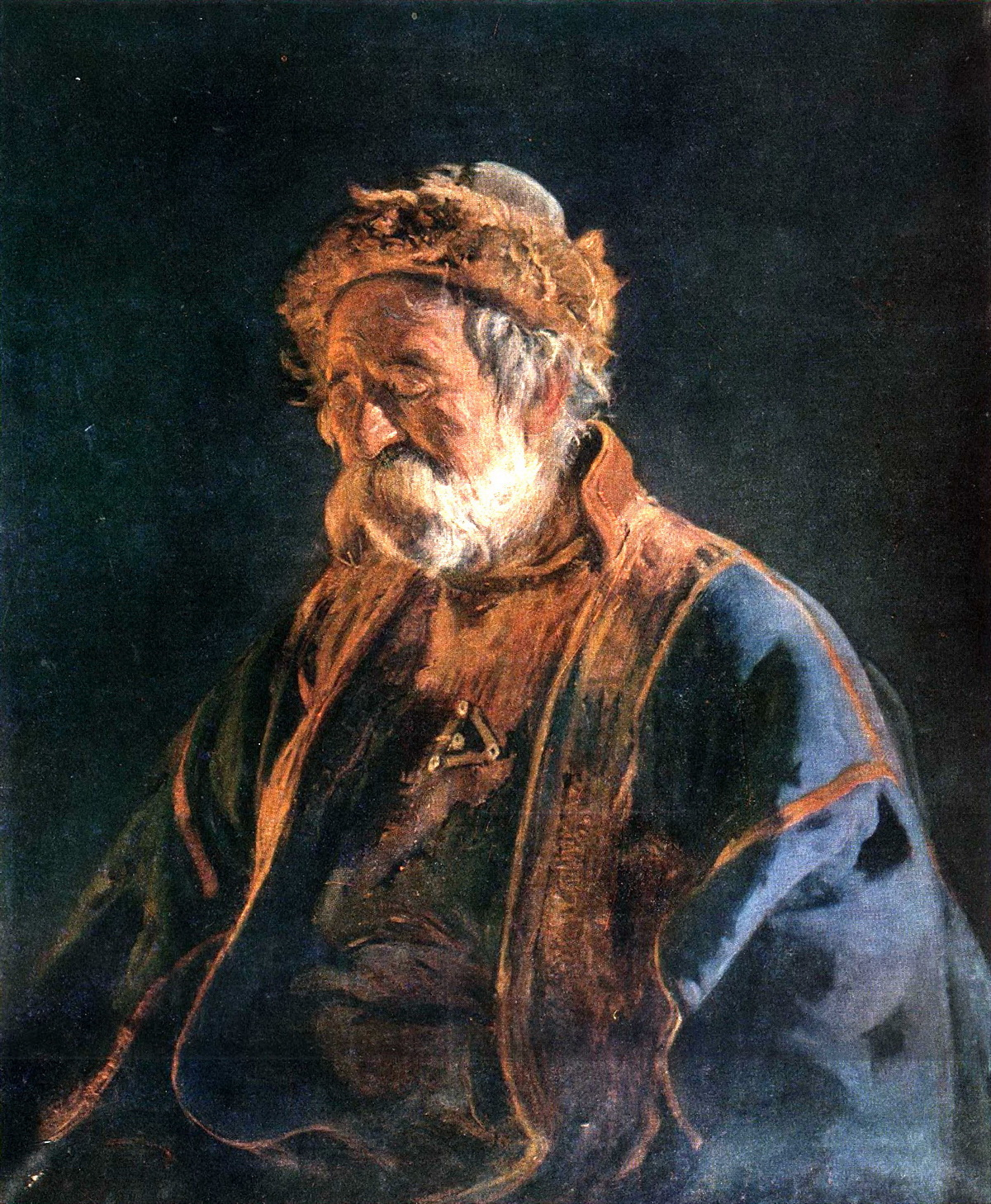
Drunk Khevsur, 1899
