= Lasha Bugadze =

Georgian novelist and playwright

Lasha Bugadze ლაშა ბუღაძე
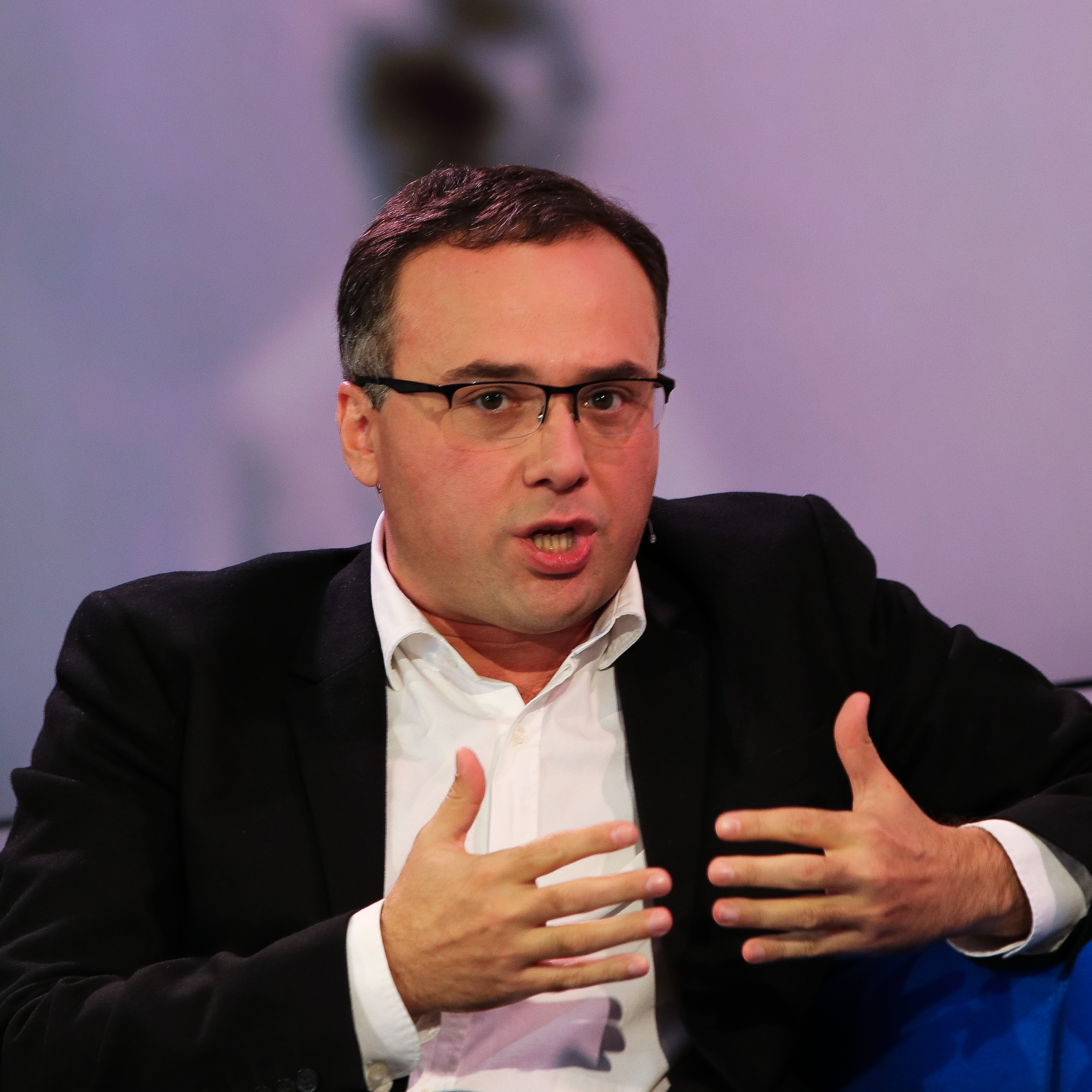
- Lasha Bugadze (2018)
- Born: 1 January 1977 (age 49); Tbilisi, Georgia
- Occupation: Writer
- Writing career
- Notable work: The Literature Express (2009)
- Literary movement: Postmodernism

Lasha Bugadze (born 1 January 1977) is a Georgian novelist and playwright. Among his noteworthy plays are Shocked Tatyana, which satirizes war heroism, and Soldier, Love, Bodyguard and ... the President.

== Biography ==
Lasha Bugadze, born in Tbilisi on 16 November 1977. He graduated from I. Nikoladze Art College and Shota Rustaveli Theatre and Film Georgian State University, the Faculty of Drama and Ivane Javakhishvili Tbilisi State University, the Faculty of Art.

Bugadze is the author of numerous novels and of plays that have been performed in many European cities. His works have been translated into French and English. Bugadze focuses his critical and ironic attention on inter-generational relationships and describes situations in which people fall victim to their prejudices, rigid ideas or stereotypes. In 2002, his satirical short-story The First Russian (პირველი რუსი), focused on a frustrated wedding night of the medieval Georgian queen Tamar and her Rus' husband Giorgi, outraged many conservatives and triggered a nationwide controversy, including heated discussions in the media, the Parliament of Georgia and the Patriarchate of the Georgian Orthodox Church.

He won the Russia and Caucasus Region category of the BBC International Radio Playwriting Competition in 2007 and one of the two top prizes in 2011 for his play The Navigator. Bughadze is a writer and presenter of literary programmes broadcast on radio and TV by the Georgian public broadcaster. He is also a gifted cartoonist. He lives and works in Tbilisi.

== Bibliography ==
His works are translated and published on Georgian, Russian, Armenian, French, German, English and Polish languages. Lasha Bughadze’s personal exhibition of caricatures and graphic works was held in Basel (Switzerland, 1995) and Tbilisi ("Baia-Gallery", 1996).

He hosts television and radio programmes on different channels. In addition, he has his own column "Comments about Moon" in the newspaper "24 Hours" and weekly literary-public columns in the journals "Tabula" and "Liberal".

=== Novels ===
- Last Bell (2004)
- Gold Era (2006)
- Caricaturist (2008)
- The Literature Express (2009)
- "LUCRECIA515" (2013)

=== Short stories ===
- Box (1998)
- The Murder of a Century (Theatrical sketches, 2000)
- The Third Floor (2003)

=== Plays ===
- Otar (1998, Tbilisi, producer D. Sakvarelidze)
- That Chair and This Bed" (2001, London, Riverside Studi, producer D. Gurji)
- La Comédie Française (2001, Festival of Seven-Minute Plays, Tbilisi-Paris, producer D. Sakvarelidze)
- Political Play (2001, Bydgoszcz (Poland), producer A. Orekhovsky)
- Caprichio (2001, Tbilisi, "Small Theatre", producer L. Tsuladze)
- Tatiana’s Indignation (2003, Moscow Art Theatre, Festival of "New Drama", producer M. Ugarov)
- Nugzar and Mephisto (2003, Tbilisi, "Royal District Theatre", producer G. Tavadze)
- President and a Security Boy (2006, Tbilisi, Rustaveli Theatre, producer R. Sturua)
- Animate Beings, Animate Processes + Inanimate Objects (2007, Tbilisi, Rustaveli Theatre, producer D. Sakvarelidze)
- Mothball (2008, Batumi, producer R. Ioseliani)
- The Navigator - The winner of the BBC International Radio Playwriting Competition 2011
- Seven Small Plays (2010, Tbilisi, M. Tumanishvili Theatre, producer Z. Getsadze)
- Tsitsino’s World (2010, Le Plessis théâtre La Riche, France, producer K. Schwartzenberg)
- While the Main Character was Sleeping (2010, Poti, producer I. Gogia)

=== Collections of Plays ===
- 25 Small Plays (2005)
- While the Main Character was Sleeping (2006)
- Mothball (2007)
- Otar and Other Plays (2008)
- Head (2010)

=== Scripts ===
- Daily TV soap opera "Before Sleeping" (Georgian Public Broadcasting 1 Channel, 2000-2002)

== Awards ==
- Caricaturists’ Festival in Gabrov (Bulgaria) (1989)
- Literary Award "Tsinandali" for the Best Play of the Year "Otar" (1999)
- Literary Award "Saba" for the Best Play of the Year "Nugzar and Mephisto" (2003)
- The book-shop chain "Parnassus" prize "The Bestseller of the Year" for the novel "The Last Bell" (2005)
- Literary Award "Saba" for the novel "The Golden Era" (2006)
- The book-shop chain "Parnassus" prize "The Bestseller of the Year" for the novel "Golden Era" (2007)
- Russian Theatrical Prize "Triumph" in dramaturgy (2007)
- Award of British Radio BBC for the play "When Taxi Drivers are Attacked" (2007)
- The Second Prize at the Competition of Bakur Sulakauri Publishing "Top Fifteen Short-Stories (for the short-story "Home-work: * Rostom-Khan", 2010)
- Theatrical Award "Duruji" for the best contemporary Georgian play of 2011 ("Mothball")
- The winner of the BBC International Radio Playwriting Competition 2011 (The First Prize) for the play The Navigator * (translated into English by Maia Kiasashvili)
