= Dimitri Shevardnadze =

დიმიტრი შევარდნაძე Dimitri Shevardnadze
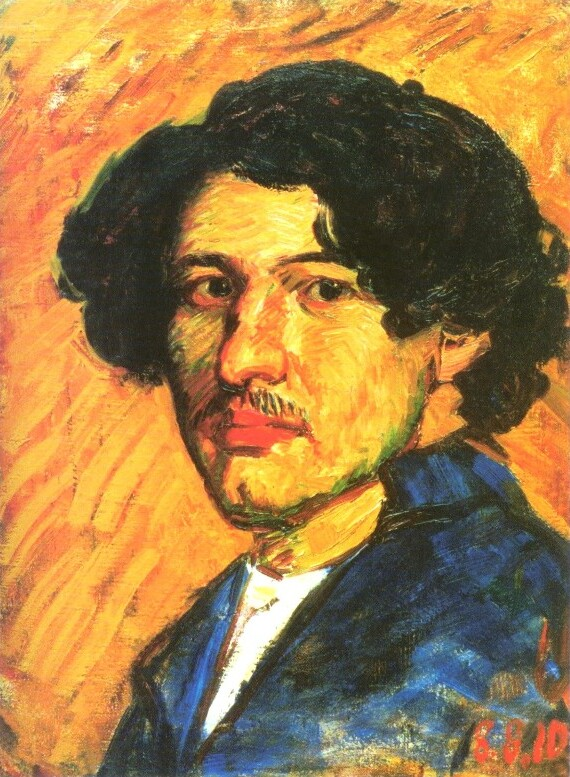
- Self-portrait of Dimitri Shevardnadze
- Born: December 1, 1885; Bakhvi, Guria, Kutais Governorate, Russian Empire
- Died: 1937 (aged 51–52); Tbilisi, Georgian SSR
- Known for: painting

Dimitri Shevardnadze (Georgian: დიმიტრი შევარდნაძე) (December 1, 1885 – 1937) was a Georgian painter, art collector and intellectual. He was among the leading Georgian cultural figures who were swept up in the Great Purges of Joseph Stalin and was executed in 1937.

== Life ==
Born in Bakhvi, a small village in the western Georgian province of Guria, then part of the Russian Empire, he was educated at the art academies of St Petersburg and Munich. Upon his return to Georgia, in 1916 he founded and led the Association of Georgian Artists. He helped also to establish the National Gallery of Fine Arts (1920) and the Tbilisi State Academy of Arts (1922). He decorated several opera and theatre performances, and movies, and designed an official logo of the Tbilisi State University.

In 1917 together with Kirill and Ilia Zdanevich, he organized the exhibition of Niko Pirosmanashvili in his apartment.

== Revolt ==
In 1937 the Communist chief of Georgia, Lavrentiy Beria, intended to destroy the medieval Metekhi church in Tbilisi, but met stubborn opposition from a group of Georgian intellectuals led by Dimitri Shevardnadze. Beria replied to their urges, that it would surely be enough to preserve a scale model of the church so that people could see it in a museum, and then told Shevardnadze privately that if he gave up his efforts to save the church he would be appointed director of the future museum. The artist refused and was eventually imprisoned and executed. The church was preserved, however.

== Family ==
Georgian politician Eduard Shevardnadze was a son of a cousin of Dmitri Shevardnadze.
