= Sergo Kobuladze =

Soviet-Georgian painter and illustrator (1909-1978)

- სერგო ქობულაძე
- Born: 7 February [O.S. 25 January] 1909; Akhaltsikhe, Tiflis Governorate, Russian Empire
- Died: 22 July 1978 (aged 69); Tbilisi, Georgian SSR, USSR
- Citizenship: Russian Empire; USSR
- Education: Tbilisi State Academy of Arts
- Awards: Stalin Prize 1st class (1947 and 1948); Shota Rustaveli Prize (1979)

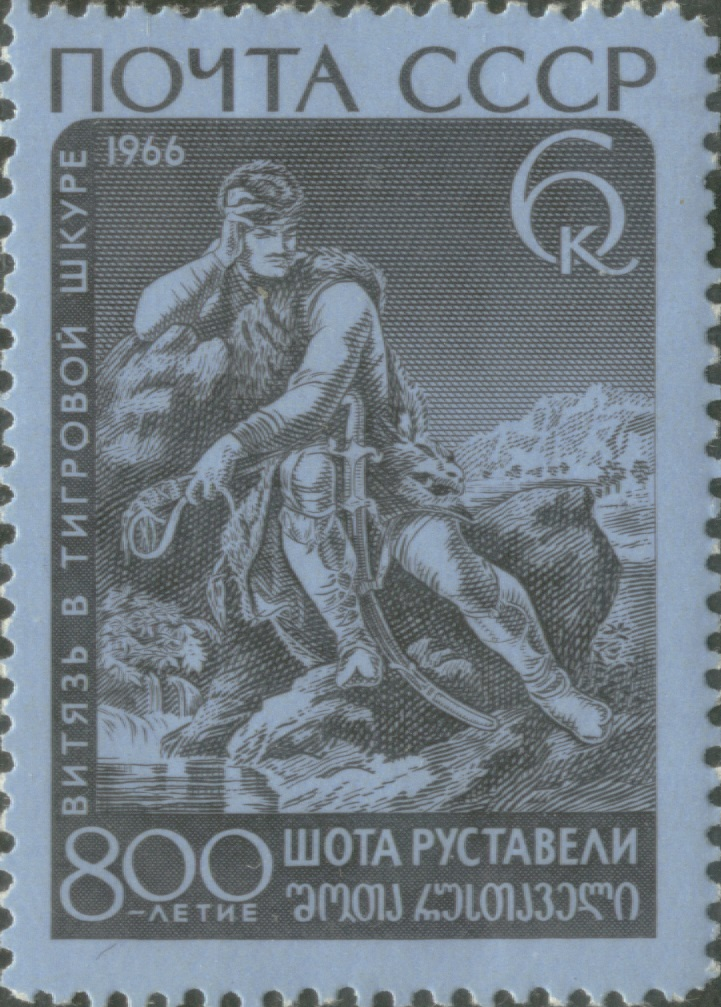

Sergo Kobuladze (Georgian: სერგო ქობულაძე; 7 February [O.S. 25 January] 1909 – 22 July 1978) was a Soviet and Georgian painter and illustrator. He was a rector of the Tbilisi State Academy of Arts (1952-1959)

== Career ==
From 1918, he went to N. Sklifasovski Art Studio; in 1925-1939, to Tbilisi Academy of Arts. The years spent in Moscow and Leningrad in the early 1930s had a great impact on the artist's professional development. From 1932 Sergo Kobuladze efficiently worked for the Tbilisi Kote Marjanishvili and Shota Rustaveli Theatres, Tbilisi Zakaria Paliashvili Opera and Ballet State Theatre and for Moscow's Bolshoi Theatre. In 1938 Sergo Kobuladze started teaching activity in Tbilisi Academy of Arts, where he founded and headed the Department of Painting and in 1953-1958, he became the Rector of the State Academy of Arts. After many years of work, in 1961, he completed the iconic painted stage curtain (170 square metres (1,800 sq ft)) for Zakaria Paliashvili Opera and Ballet State Theatre. Several versions of the curtain were drawn up. According to available documentary material, a compositional illustration based on the theme of Zakaria Paliashvili's opera Absalom and Eteri was placed on the curtain during the first stage. The remaining space was devoted to a portion of an enormous, bulky and rather rigid carpet-patterned curtain. The artist later changed his mind and replaced the narrative compositional element with the image of a mythical character. The audience dubbed this portrait the "Muse of Music." In 1973 fire completely destroyed the hand-painted curtain.

== Awards and honours ==
- Stalin Prize 1st class (1947 and 1948)
- Shota Rustaveli Prize (1979)
