= Gia Gugushvili =

Georgian painter

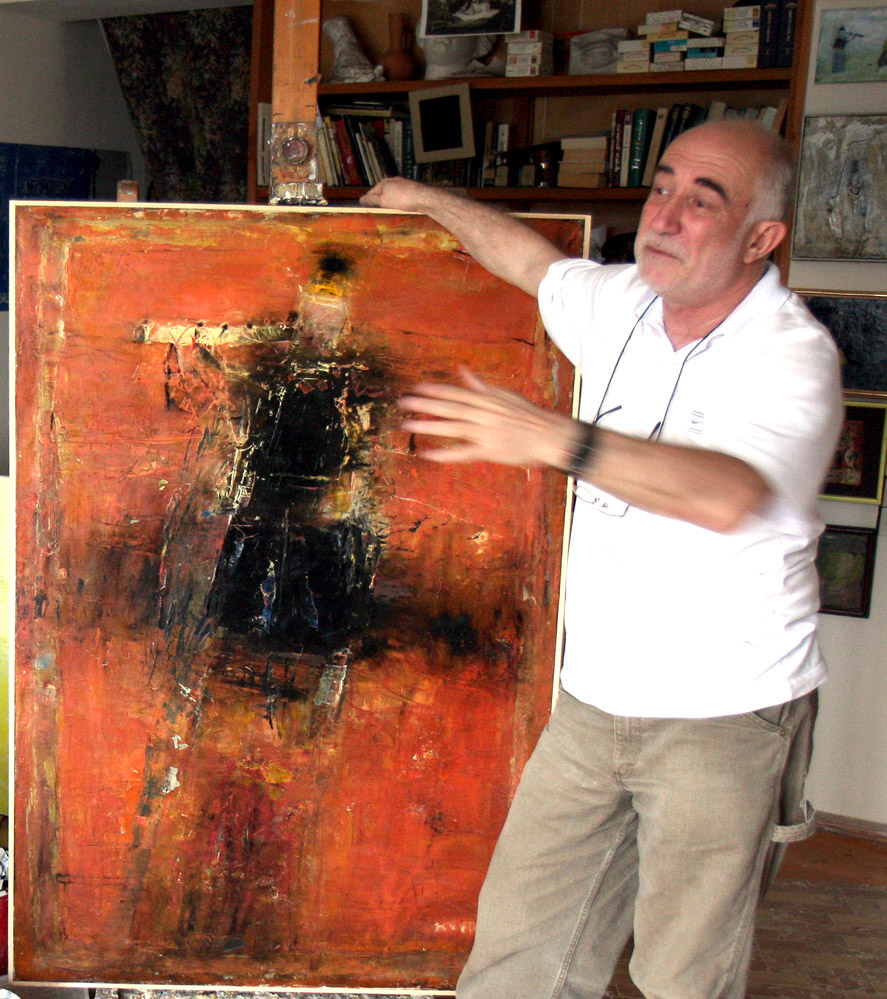
Gia Gugushvili with his painting "Eastern Melody". Photo by Mikhail Evstafiev

Gia Gugushvili (Georgian: გია გუგუშვილი; born August 16, 1952) is a Georgian painter. Gia Gugushvili has produced nonfigurative as well as and minimalistic figurative compositions. His paintings are in museums and private collections all over the world.

Gia Gugushvili was born in Tbilisi. Graduated from the Tbilisi State Academy of Arts in 1977. He was the Rector of the Tbilisi State Academy of Arts from 2014 to 2022.
