= Guram Dolenjashvili =

From series Moonlit nights of Imeretia. Variant 5. Pencil., 1993

Guram Dolenjashvili (Georgian: გურამ დოლენჯაშვილი; Russian: Гурам Доленджашвили; born 9 March 1943 in Kutaisi) is a Georgian painter often working in a monochrome technique. He is a Meritorious Artist of Georgia and an honorary member of Russian Academy of Arts (since 2004).

Dolenjashvili was born in Kutaisi. He graduated from the Tbilisi Academy of Arts in 1968 where he studied in the shop of Lado Grigolia. He mostly lived in Kutaisi but travel led to Russian North, White Sea, Kamchatka and Chukotka. His works are exhibited in the Art Museum of Georgia, Tretyakov Gallery, Pushkin Museum, Russian Museum and many others.

Many of his works are landscapes made in black and white, using a graphite pencil or etching with slightly surrealist shifting of reality still he is often considered a follower of traditions Russian realist landscapers of Ivan Shishkin and Yuly Klever.

Now, Guram signed the agreement with Raffian Art to produce limited editions of giclees.

== Featured personal exhibitions ==
- Tixi Bay, 1979
- Saint-Petersburg, 1984
- Tbilisi. 1988
- Moscow, Central House of Artists (TsDKh), 1996
- “Logovaz” at Tverskaya St., “Mercedes Benz”, Moscow, 1998
- Moscow, Foreign Trade Centre (Hammer Federation), 1998
- Moscow, Parliament of Russia Federation, 1999
- Moscow, The World Bank, 2000, 2001
- Moscow, The Directorate of Exhibition and Auctions, the RF of Ministry Culture, 2003

== International exhibitions ==
- XIII Biennial exhibition of easel painting, Yugoslavia, 1979
- Biennial of European Print (plate), Heidelberg, Germany, 1979
- “Intergrafika-80”, Kraków, Poland, 1980
- XIV Biennial exhibition of easel painting, Luibliana, Yugoslavia, 1981
- International Poster Exhibition, Moscow, 1982
- Biennial exhibition of easel painting, Muilouise, France, 1982
- XV Biennial exhibition of easel painting, Luibliana, Yugoslavia, 1983
- III Biennial exhibition of European Print (plate), Baden-Baden, Germany, 1983
- Triennial exhibition “Artists against War”, Maidanek, Poland, 1985
- Biennial exhibition of easel in Varna, Bulgaria, 1985
- (Ist Place — “Silver Plate” and diploma)
- II International Festival of Arts, Baghdad, Iraq, 1988
- III Biennial exhibition of easel painting in Bhopal, Matia-Pradesh, India, 1995
- II International Exhibition of easel painting, Kaliningrad (Kenigsberg), Russia 1996
- International Arts Fair “The Art of XX century”, Art-Manezh, Moscow, Russia, 1996
- I International Quadrienneal of graphics, Moscow, 1997
- V International Arts Exhibition “Palette”, Central House of Artists, Moscow, 1999
- International Arts Fair, Art-Manezh, Moscow, 2000
- III International Triennial of printing graphic, Ufa, Bashkortostan, 2001

== Other exhibitions and auctions ==
- Magnum association, Moscow, 1993 (auction)
- Istoki Co., Moscow 1993-1994
- Cohem City, FRG, 1994, 1995, 1996
- “Russian village” at Niigata, Japan, 1995
- Russian Culture Days in Delhi, India, 1995
- “Russian Art Gallery at Vozdvizhenka”-personal exhibition, Moscow, 1996
- Kufstein City, Austria, 1996
- “Tetterode Grafik – 1997” contest, Holland (A Window to Europe, Moscow)
- “Russian Artists tribute to Moscow”, Moscow, 1997
- Gallery “World and colours”, London, England, 1999
- Gallery “Galina”, London, England, 1999
- Australia, EXPO-88
- France, 1977
- Sweden, 1984, 1985
- Great Britain, 1977, 1978
- Switzerland, 1985
- USA, 1978, 1980, 1982, 1984
- Arts Fair of the socialist countries 1985, 1986, 1987
- «InterArt-85», Poznan, Poland
- Austria, 1980, 1985
- «InterArt -86», Poznan, Poland
- FRG, 1983, 1985
- Los Angeles, USA, 1990 (auction)
- Czechoslovakia, 1984, GDR, 1984
- Great Britain, “Art/London-91” (auction)

== Museums ==
- State Tretyakov gallery
- State Pushkin Museum
- The Bakhzadeh Museum, Dushanbe, Tajikistan
- State Oriental Arts Museum
- State Russian Museum
- Modern Art Museum, Cologne, Germany
- Arts Museum, Canton, Ohio, USA
- Chelyabinsk Picture Gallery
- New Orleans Museum, Louisiana, USA
- Museum of the Resistance, Brussels, Belgium
- North Kazakhstan Oblast Museum of Dodgy Collection from Gularto Glasnost
- People’s Museum, Poznan, Poland
- Poznan Bureau of Modern Arts, Poznan, Poland
- Slovak National Gallery, Bratislava, Slovakia
- Georgian National Museum, National Gallery
- Central Museum of Revolution, Moscow
- Tbilisi State Museum of Arts
- Kutaisi Picture Gallery, Georgia
- State Historical Museum, Kutaisi
- Bashkirskiy State Museum of Art of Nesterova
- Museum of Art of Tzjik Republic
