= Shalva Kikodze =

Georgian expressionist painter

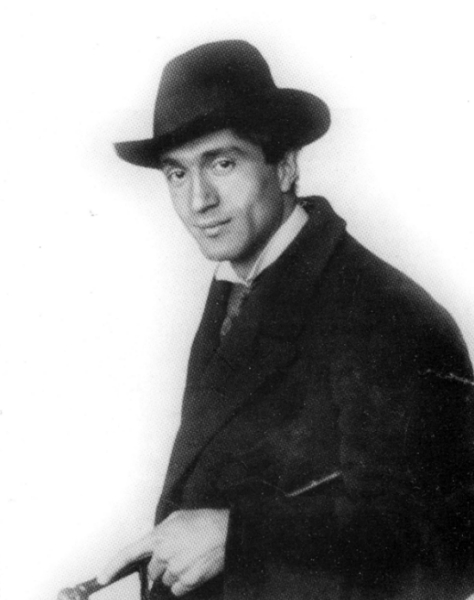
- Born: შალვა ქიქოძე 1894; Bakhvi, Guria, Georgia
- Died: November 7, 1921 (aged 26–27); Freiburg, Germany
- Education: Moscow School of Painting, Sculpture and Architecture

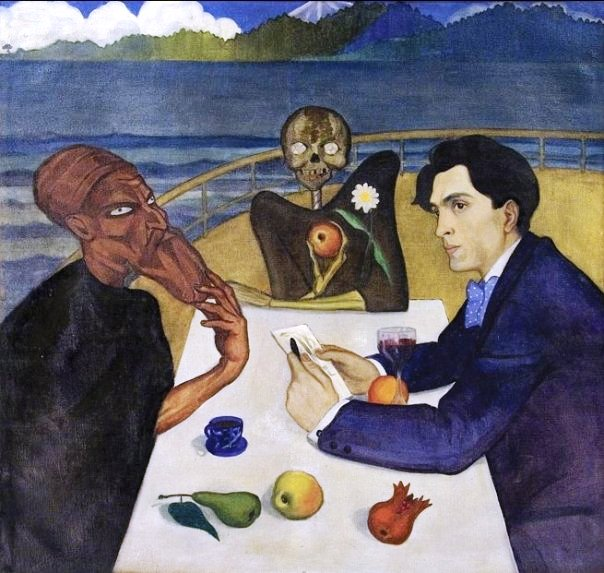
In memory of the young deceased friend (1920)

Shalva Kikodze (Georgian: შალვა ქიქოძე; 1894–1921) was a Georgian expressionist painter, graphic artist and theatre decorator. Together with Lado Gudiashvili and David Kakabadze, he is considered a key figure in Georgian art of the early 20th century.

== Biography ==
He was born in a remote Georgian village Bakhvi, Guria, Georgia. From 1914 to 1918, he studied at Moscow School of Painting, Sculpture and Architecture. In 1916, he took part in an expedition to the Georgian village Nabakhtevi and made copies of the 15th-century murals from the local church.

As a cartoonist, while still studying in Moscow, he began to collaborate with the Georgian Humor magazines Lakhti (Skippng Rope), Eshmakis Matrahi (the Devil’s Whip), as well as theater magazines: Theater and Life, Theater and Music and the Russian-language magazine Art – all published in Tbilisi.

He stayed in his motherland for a short period of 1918-1920, and worked chiefly as a theater decorator for Jabadari Theater in Tbilisi. Afterwards he moved to Paris, where he, together with his fellow painters, Gudiashvili and Kakabadze, held an exhibition in 1921. He died in Freiburg, Germany, on November 7, 1921.

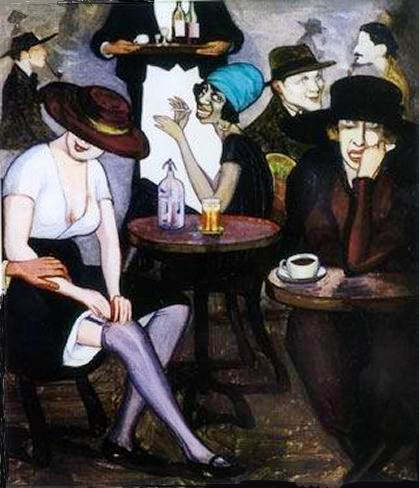
In a Restaurant

Most of his works are now on display at the Art Museum of Georgia, Tbilisi, Georgia.

== Some important works ==
- “Khevsureti”, 1920
- “Luxembourg Garden”, 1920
- “Gurian woman holding a jar in her hand”, 1921
- “Ajarian women in chadors”, 1921
- “In the restaurant”, 1921
