= Valerian Sidamon-Eristavi =

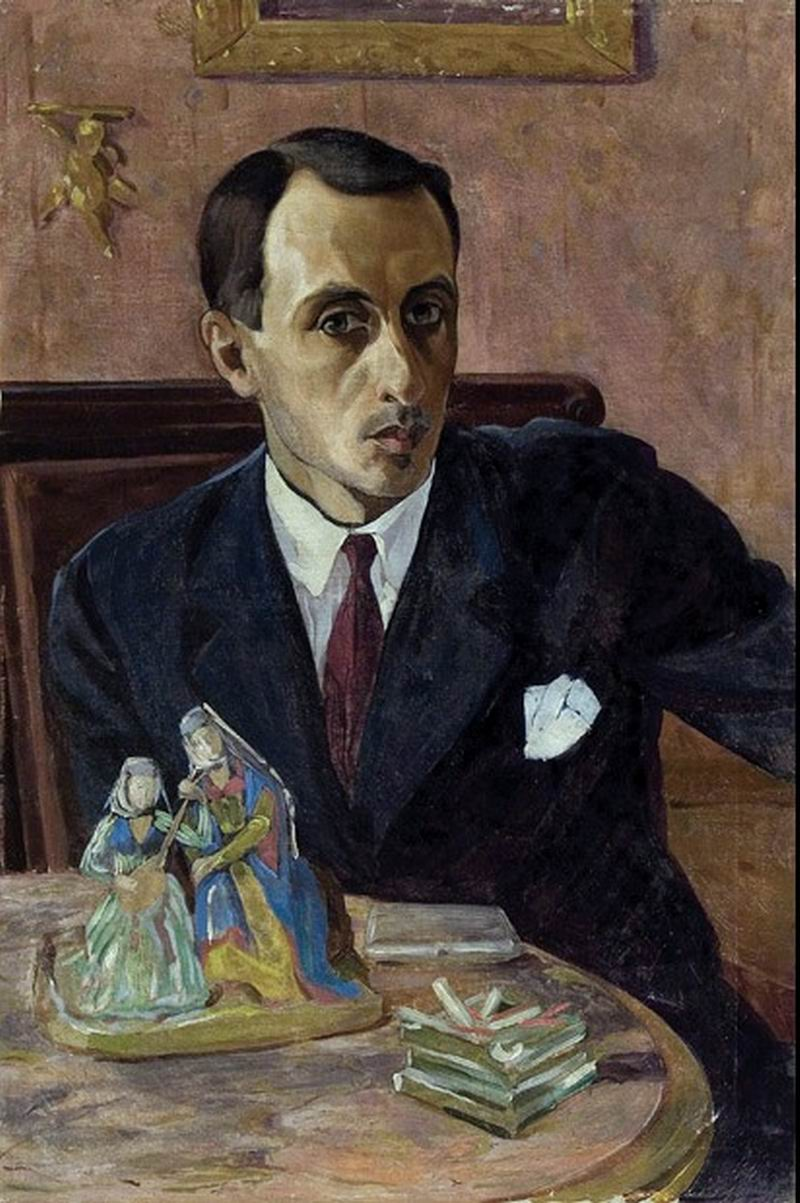
Valerian Sidamon-Eristavi. Self-portrait

Valerian Sidamon-Eristavi (Georgian: ვალერიან სიდამონ-ერისთავი; 2 July 1889 – 9 June 1943) was a Georgian Modernist artist and set designer.

Born in the town of Kvareli into a noble family, Valerian Sidamon-Eristavi studied arts at Tiflis and Moscow. Returning to Georgia in 1915, he made a name as a caricaturist and illustrator and later switched to historical painting. He became best known for his set design for the Georgian theatre and cinema, for which he fruitfully collaborated with the leading director Kote Marjanishvili. He worked as an art director for about 35 films between 1922 and 1935. In the late 1930s, he mostly retired to teaching arts.
