= Ucha Japaridze =

Soviet Georgian painter

Ucha Malakievich Japaridze (Georgian: უჩა ჯაფარიძე, 17 August [O.S. 4 August] 1906 – 6 July 1988) was a Soviet and Georgian painter.

He was born in Gari, a small village in the Racha region of Georgia, which was then part of the Russian Empire.

As a painter, Japaridze was one of the most important figures in the development of 20th-century Georgian visual arts. He enjoyed creating detailed portraits and is responsible for producing a series of portraits of prominent persons, such as his 1949 pencil and pastel sketch of Vano Sarajishvili, currently held at the Art Palace of Georgia - Museum of Cultural History in Tbilisi, Georgia.

Japaridze was given a number of awards during his life, including People's Illustrator of Georgian SSR (1946), Honored Worker of Arts of the Georgian SSR (1943), Academician of the Georgian Academy of Arts (1958), Laureate of the Shota Rustaveli Prize (1987), and Honored Citizen of Tbilisi (1982).

He was a chancellor of the Tbilisi State Academy of Arts from 1942 to 1948.

He died in Tbilisi in 1988. His former home in Tbilisi was turned into a museum in the same year.
