= Tbilisi State Academy of Arts =

Public university in Tbilisi, Georgia

- თბილისის სახელმწიფო სამხატვრო აკადემია
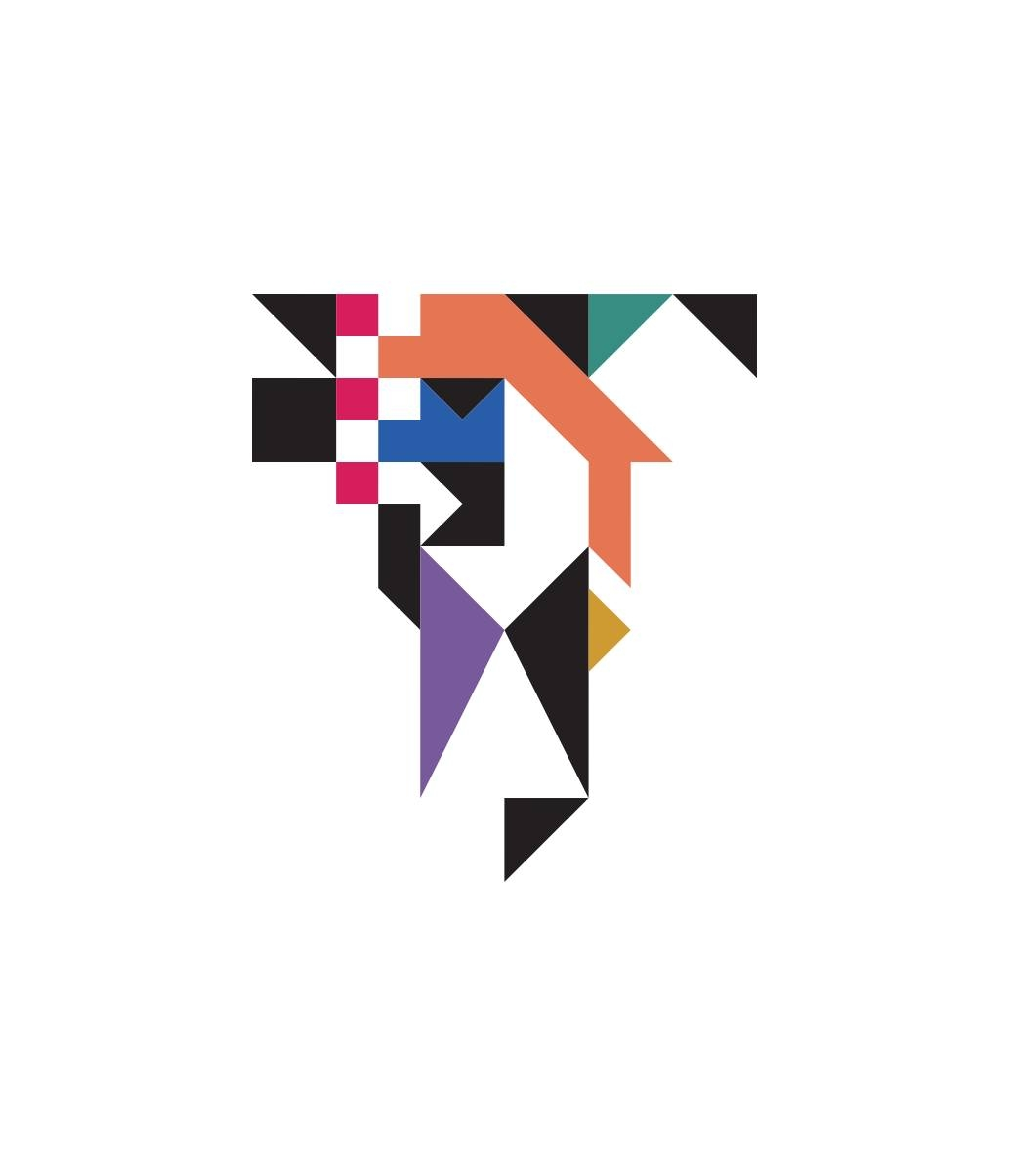
- Type: Public
- Established: 8 March 1922; 104 years ago
- Rector: Karaman Kutateladze
- Location: Tbilisi, Georgia
- Campus: Urban
- Nickname: TSAA
- Website: /en/ www.art.edu.ge

The Tbilisi State Academy of Arts (Georgian: თბილისის სახელმწიფო სამხატვრო აკადემია, tbilisis sakhelmts'ipo samkhat'vro ak'ademia) is one of the oldest universities in Georgia and the Caucasus. It is located in central Tbilisi near the Tbilisi Opera and Ballet Theatre on Rustaveli Avenue.

Dating from the 1850s, the building that houses the Tbilisi State Academy of Art is a heritage site in Tbilisi. Defined by an eclectic mix of European and oriental architectural and artistic styles, the building is known for its Mirror Halls, the adornments of which, executed by Qajar artists invited from Iran, are reminiscent of the decorations of oriental palaces.

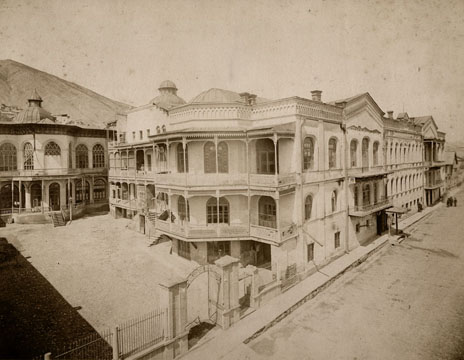
Tbilisi State Academy of Arts building by Dmitri Yermakov. 1884

Gigo Gabashvili in the centre of photo, 1922.

== History ==
The Art Academy of Georgia was founded on 8 March 1922 by order of the People's Commissariat on Education. Four faculties were established: painting, sculpture, graphic arts, and architecture. In 1927, the department of ceramics was added. In 1922, Mose Toidze founded an art school providing training to young people wishing to enter the Academy. The academy is housed in the former mansion of Vardan Arshakuni, completely reconstructed and refurbished by the architect Simon Kldiashvili in 1902.

Renowned artists have taught at the academy since its founding; the first were Gigo Gabashvili, Iakob Nikoladze, Eugene Lanceray, Joseph Sharlemagne, Henryk Hryniewski, Yeghishe Tadevosyan, Nikolay Sklifosovskiy, Nicholas Antadze, Anatoli Kalgin, Nikolay Severove, Dimitri Shevardnadze, Michael Machavariani, Alexander Pitskhelauri, Michael Khananashvili, Boris Shebuev, Mose Toidze, Alexander Tsimakuridze, Nicholas Kandelaki, Valerian Sidamon-Eristavi, David Kakabadze, Lado Gudiashvili, George Sesiashvili, Ucha Japaridze, Shalva Amiranashvili, Apollon Kutateladze, Vasili Shukhaev, Sergo Kobuladze, Silovan Kakabadze, Shota Mikatadze, David Tsitsishvili, Zakro Maisuradze, and Lado Grigolia.

The Tbilisi State Academy of Arts is located in the former “House of Arshakuni,” which was designed by architect G. Ivanov in 1856. The interiors were designed in the Qajar artistic style by Iranian masters who were working in Tbilisi. Until 1937, the building also contained the ballet studio (the Mirror Hall) of Maria Perini, the spouse of artist Henryk Hryniewski, as well as the latter's art studio; the studio of Professor Gigo Gabashvili; and the Kobulashvili family flats. In 1972, a new ten-floor academy block was built (architects A. Kurdiani, M. Chkhikvadze, L. Sumbadze, constructor D. Kajaia). In 2005–2006, the new block was restored by Cartu Bank.

=== Faculties ===
- Visual Arts - Dean Megi Tsitlidze
- Media Arts - Dean Nana Iashvili
- Design - Dean Giorgi Iashvili
- Architecture - Dean Irakli Pirmisashvili
- Restoration, Art History and Theory - Dean Tamara Khundadze

All educational programs at the Tbilisi State Academy of Arts are conducted in the Georgian language. For applicants with a foreign upper-secondary school education that lack qualifications in Georgian a language test is required.

=== Rectors ===
- 1922–1926 – Giorgi Chubinashvili
- 1927–1930 – Alexander Duduchava
- 1930–1932 – Vakhtang Kotetishvili
- 1932–1936 – Grigol Bukhnikashvili
- 1936–1942 – Silovan Kakabadze
- 1942–1948 – Ucha Japaridze
- 1948–1952 – Mamia Duduchava
- 1952–1959 – Sergo Kobuladze
- 1959–1972 – Apollon Kutateladze
- 1972–1982 – Giorgi Totibadze
- 1982–1987 – Zurab Nizharadze
- 1987–1992 – Tengiz Peradze
- 1992–2003 – Soso Koyava
- 2003–2012 – Gia Bugadze
- 2012–2012 – Irena Popiashvili
- 2012–2014 – Tinatin Kldiashvili
- 2014–2022 – Gia Gugushvili
- 2022–present – Karaman Kutateladze

== Exhibitions ==
The academy operates the following exhibition spaces:

- Museum – includes 618 paintings, course and diploma artworks. Among them are art-pieces by Gigo Gabashvili (8 works), Elene Akhvlediani, Ludwig Luigi Longo, Kirill Zdanevich, Tamara Balanchivadze, Mose Toidze, Aleksander Tsimakuridze, Korneli Sanadze, Reno Turkia, Koki Makharadze
- Tapestry Museum on Shardin street
