= Georgian Museum of Fine Arts =

- ქართული სახვითი ხელოვნების მუზეუმი
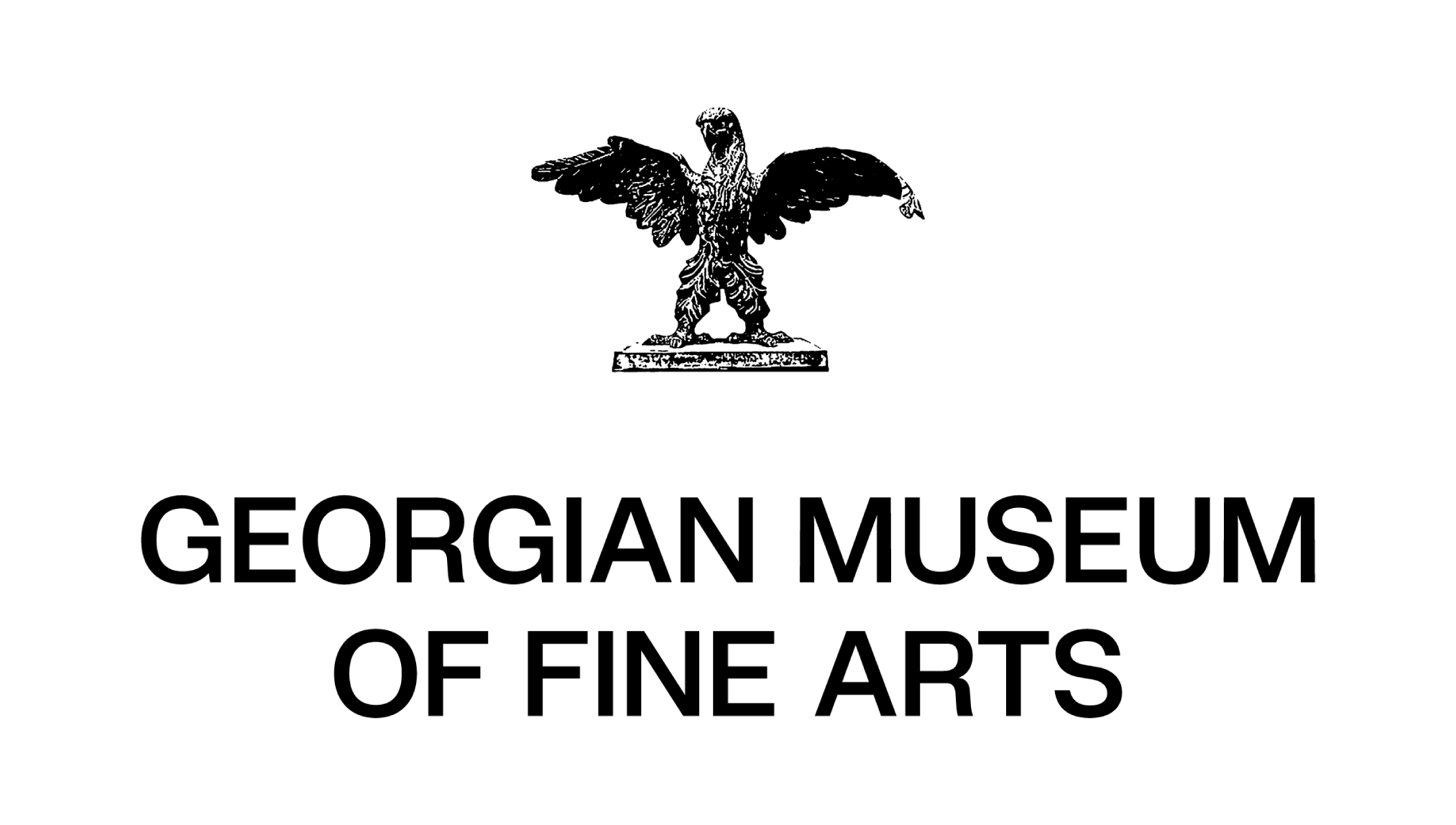

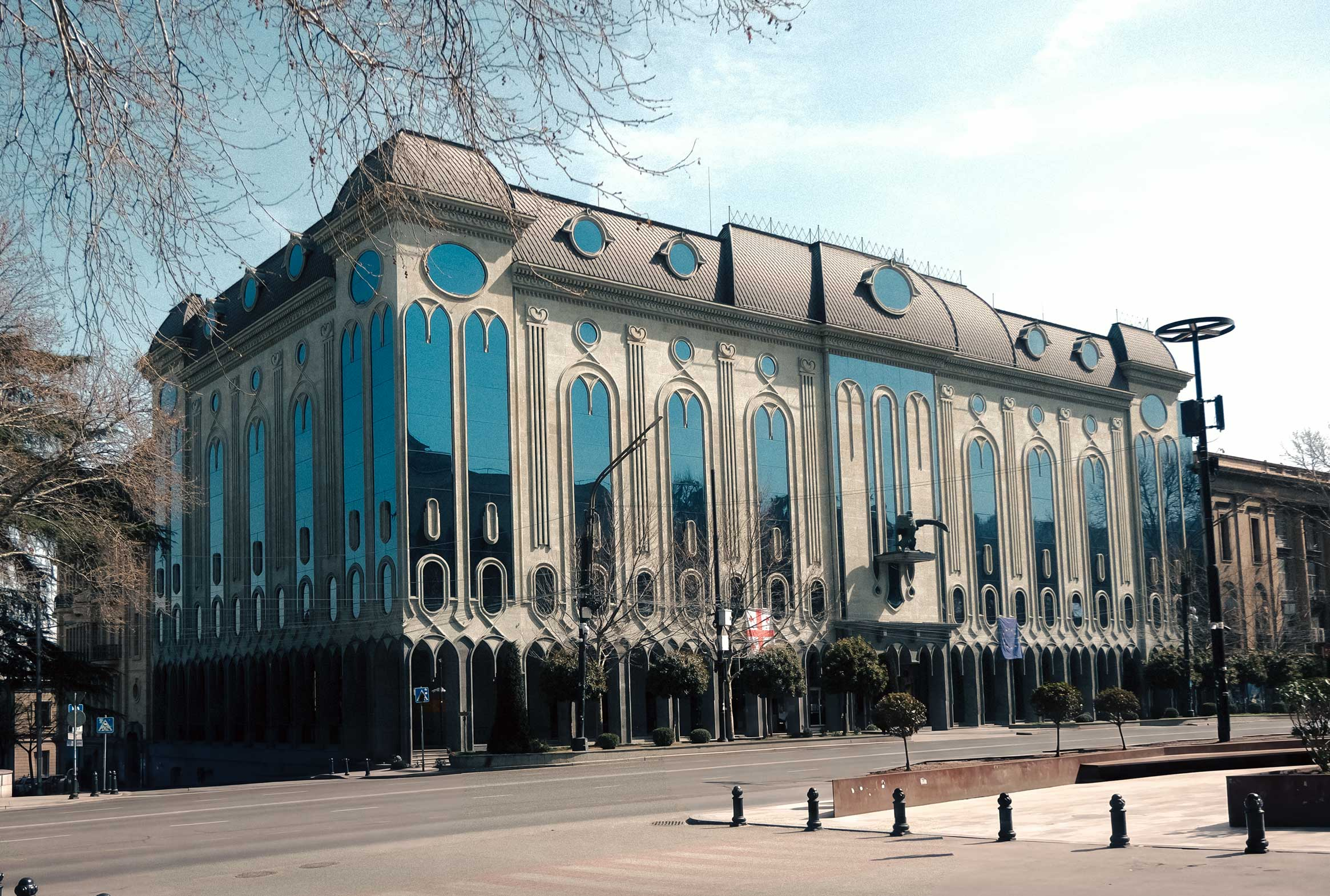
- Georgian Museum of Fine Arts facade
- Established: September 26, 2018
- Location: 7 Rustaveli Ave, Tbilisi, Georgia
- Coordinates: 41°41′50″N 44°47′58″E
- Type: Art museum
- Founders: Dr. George (Gia) Jokhtaberidze & Manana Shevardnadze
- Owner: Magti LLC (not to be confused with Magticom
- Website: finearts.ge

Georgian Museum of Fine Arts (Georgian: ქართული სახვითი ხელოვნების მუზეუმი) is a private art museum located on the Rustaveli Avenue in Tbilisi, Georgia (country). The construction broke ground in 2013 and is the only building in Georgia built purposely to house art exhibitions. The museum official opening was held on September 26, 2018, while it opened to the public on October 2, 2018. The museum houses over 3500 artworks, created by over 80 artists during the last 70 years. The museum exhibits private art collection of the family of Dr. George (Gia) Jokhtaberidze and Manana Shevardadze, founders of Magticom, the largest telecommunications company in Georgia.

== History ==
Dr. George (Gia) Jokhtaberidze and Manana Shevardnadze started collecting art in the 1990s. After successful entrepreneurial endeavors, Jokhtaberidze started buying art for personal interests. During one of the shopping visits, the gallery was about to ship art to a foreign country for very low prices. Jokhtaberidze eventually realized that if art was scattered around the world without proper collection, documentation and exhibition, it would be lost forever. Since most of the art was created during the Soviet Union and the Iron Curtain, the art was not yet well-known. Jokhtaberidze aimed to collect, restore and preserve Georgian art. In the beginning, the mission did not include the idea to build a completely new museum building, the idea was to collect and donate all the art to state museums. However, due to the collapse of the USSR and subsequent economic and civil turmoil, the state museums were left in dire situation and were unable to accept all the art.

After collecting art for over 23 years and leading the largest telecommunication company in Georgia, Jokhtaberidze saw an opportunity to buy real estate right in front of the building of Parliament of Georgia. He then commissioned the construction of a complex of buildings that would become the Georgian Museum of Fine Arts and the Art House.

== Exhibitions ==
To mark its fifth anniversary, in October 2023 the museum hosted its first major temporary exhibition, Banksy: Birth of an Icon, dedicated to the British street artist Banksy. The exhibition was curated by Steve Lazarides, Banksy's former photographer and manager during their nearly twelve-year collaboration that began in 1997. Spread across seven rooms, it presented Banksy originals in media including sculpture and canvas alongside previously unseen documentary photographs and film footage taken by Lazarides. One room, curated by Elene Kapanadze, featured works by contemporary Tbilisi street artists, including Gagosha, Mishiko Sulakauri, Semichka, Koska and Sick'n Tired. The exhibition ran for approximately four months.

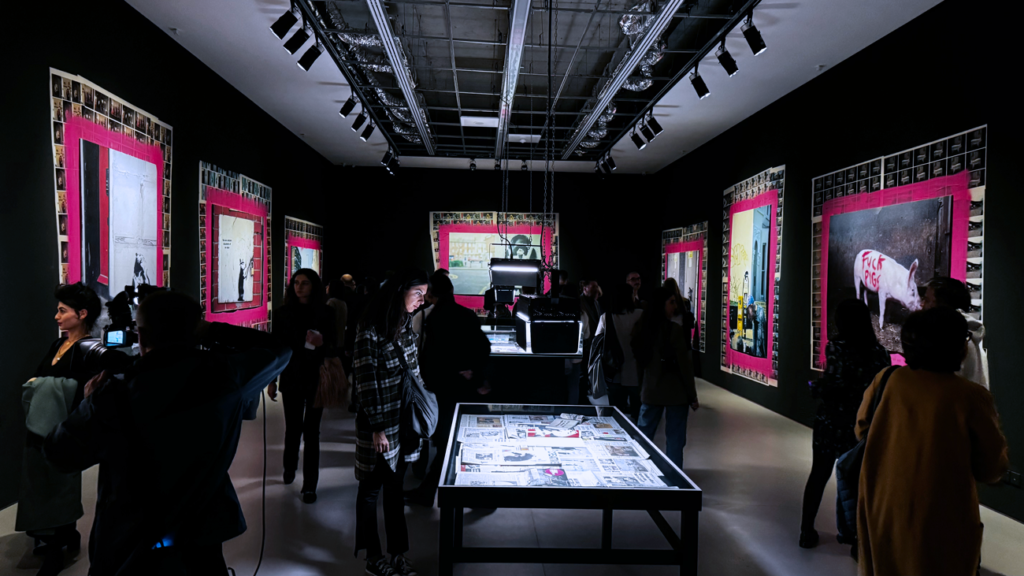
Banksy Birth of an Icon Exhibition at the Georgian Musem of Fine Arts

== Building ==
=== Site ===
The museum stands at 7 Rustaveli Avenue, on a site previously occupied by a building designed by Otto Simonson and erected in 1865–67. That building first housed a court chamber and was later converted into a hotel, known successively as the "Oriant" and the "Intourist". In 1977 it became the Artists' House (Mkhatvris Sakhli), which was destroyed by fire in 1991 during the civil war in Tbilisi, after which the site stood derelict for almost two decades.

=== Construction ===
Construction of a new multifunctional complex on the site began in 2013. Designed by the architect Archil Kurdiani, the building was deliberately divided into four volumes of differing size, with the façade stepping down in height from the Rustaveli Avenue side toward Gudiashvili Street. The complex was planned to include the museum and an exhibition hall alongside a restaurant, swimming pool and underground public parking. It is the only building in Georgia purpose-built to house art exhibitions. The façade is clad in Bolnisi stone, a volcanic tuff historically quarried in the Bolnisi area of southern Georgia and long used in Georgian architecture. The central façade is topped by a statue of an eagle, adopted as the museum's emblem and modelled on miniature eagle sculptures of the 2nd–1st centuries BC excavated at Vani in western Georgia. Inside, the permanent exhibition is arranged over three floors, with 31 halls linked by glass staircases.

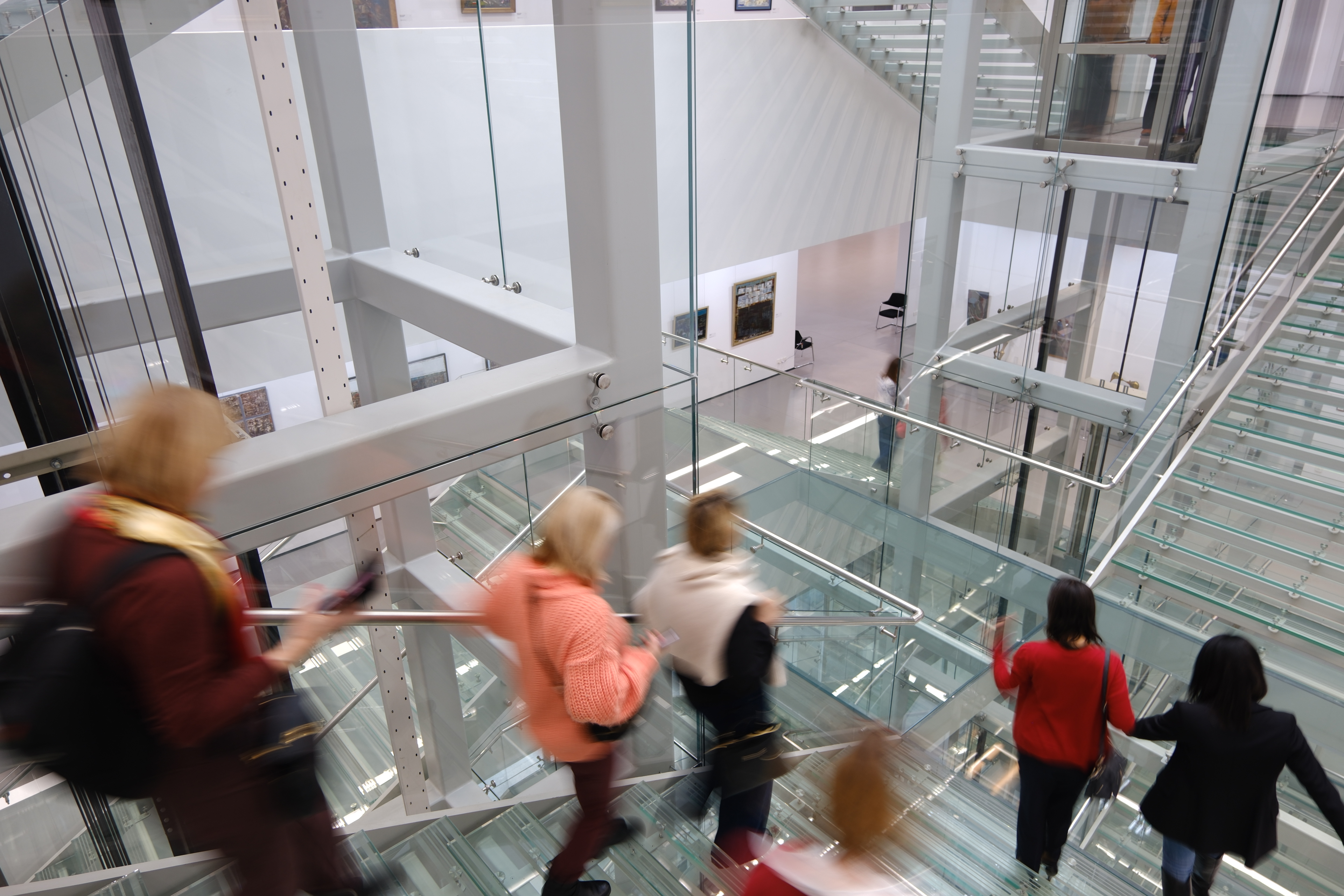
Georgian Museum of Fine Arts Glass Staircase

=== Art House ===
The museum forms part of a larger complex called the Art House, which occupies three connected buildings opposite the Parliament of Georgia and combines cultural spaces with dining and leisure facilities. Alongside the museum's own café and shop, it houses a conference hall and a further exhibition hall, three eating and drinking venues — the Georgian restaurant "Kharcho", the European "Brasserie Buvette" and the bar-lounge "Publica" — as well as "Fit Club", a fitness centre with a Finnish sauna and a rooftop swimming pool. A three-level car park with space for around 155 vehicles serves the complex.

== Collections ==
Artists

3rd Floor

- Levan Chogoshvili
- Khuta Iremadze
- Tato Akhalkatsishvili
- Marina Eliozishvili
- Ekaterine Abuladze
- Ia Arsenishvili
- Gia Gugushvili
- Oleg Timchenko
- Karaman Kutateladze
- Davit Mindorashvili
- Shalva Matuashvili
- Levan Lagidze
- Geno Zakaraia
- Keti Davlianidze
- Irakli Sutidze
- Yuri Berishvili
- Dali Podiashvili
- Jemal Kukhalashvili
- Tamaz Kakabadze
- Gia Mirzashvili
- Mamuka Tsetskhladze
- Niko Tsetskhlazde
- Nikoloz Shengelaia

4th Floor

- Otar Chkhartishvili
- Davit Monavardisashvili
- Koki Makharadze
- Zaal Bachanashvili
- Eduard Shakhnazarov
- Irakli Parjiani
- Esma Oniani
- Sergei Parajanov
- Lev Baiakhchev
- Omar Durmishidze
- Davit Maisashvili
- Tsira Kalandadze
- Gaiane Khachaturyan
- Mikheil Eristavi
- Vladimer Kandelaki
- Givi Toidze
- Radish Tordia
- Dimitri Eristavi
- Gogi Chagelishvili
- Givi Aghapishvili
- Albert Dilbarian
- Tamaz Khutsishvili
- Tengiz Mirzashvili

5th Floor

- Edmond Kalandadze
- Zurab Nijharadze
- Levan Tsutskiridze
- Jibson Khundadze
- Temo Japaridze
- Duda Gabashvili
- Alexandre Bandzeladze
- Ana Shalikashvili
- Natalia Palavandishvili
- Natela Iankoshvili
- Qetevan Maghalashvili
- Leopold Dzadzamidze
- Elguja Amashukeli
- Apolon Kutateladze
