= Keti =

Keti may refer to:

== People ==
- Keti Chkhikvadze, Georgian fashion designer
- Keti Chomata, Greek singer
- Keti Chukhrov, Russian philosopher
- Keti Davlianidze, Georgian painter
- Keti Khitiri (born 1982), Georgian actress
- Keti Shitrit (born 1960), Israeli politician
- Keti Tenenblat (born 1944), Turkish-Brazilian mathematician
- Keti Topuria (born 1986)
- Keti Tsatsalashvili (born 1992), Georgian chess player
- Nafoitoa Talaimanu Keti, Samoan politician

== Places ==
- Keti, Armenia
- Keti Bandar, Pakistan
  - Keti Bandar Port

== Other ==
- KETI-LP
