= Shota Rustaveli Prize =

The Shota Rustaveli State Prize (created in 1965) is the highest prize awarded by Georgia in the fields of art and literature. The first recipients of the prize were Konstantine Gamsakhurdia (writer), Irakli Abashidze (poet), Elguja Amashukeli (sculptor), and Lado Gudiashvili (painter) in 1965. Other recipients of the prize include Mikola Bazhan (Ukrainian poet), Sergo Kobuladze (painter), Irakli Ochiauri (sculptor), Sergo Zakariadze (actor), Nino Ramishvili (dancer), Iliko Sukhishvili (dancer), Ramaz Chkhikvadze (actor), Guram Pataraia (producer), Tengiz Abuladze (producer), Mukhran Machavariani (poet), Tamaz Chiladze (poet), Chabua Amirejibi (novelist), Levan Tsutskiridze (painter), and others.

== Laureates ==
Year	Laureates
1965	Konstantine Gamsakhurdia, Lado Gudiashvili, Irakli Abashidze, Elguja Amashukeli
1969	Vladimer Aleksi-Meskhishvili, Andria Balanchivadze, and Giorgi Leonidze
1971	Konstantine Lortkipanidze, Archil Sulakauri, Alexi Machavariani, Elene Akhvlediani, Vaso Godziashvili, Sergo Zakariadze, Guram Pataraia
1973	Vladimer Grigolia, Murman Lebanidze, Nino Ramishvili, Sulkhan Nasidze, Iliko Sukhishvili, Ivan Chkhenkeli, Makvala Mrevlishvili
1975	Merab Berdzenishvili, Nodar Dumbadze, Nikoloz Zabolotski, Niko Ketskhoveli, Revaz Lagidze, Shota Nishnianidze, Akaki Vasadze
1977	Guram Sagaradze, Revaz Inanishvili, Jansugh Kakhidze, Korneli Sanadze
1979	Tengiz Abuladze, Veriko Anjaparidze, Lomer Akhvlediani, Irakli Onofrishvili, Soso Chkhaidze, Fridon Khalvashi, Sergo Kobuladze
1981	Meri Davitashvili, Revaz Tabukashvili, Givi Toidze, Mushni Lasuria, Ioseb Noneshvili, Robert Sturua, Guram Phanchikidze, Shota Qavlashvili, Gia Kancheli, Sulkhan Tsintsadze, Ramaz Chkhikvadze, Mirian Shvelidze
1983	Sesilia Takaishvili, Eliso Virsaladze, Guram Kutateladze, Otar Chiladze, Revaz Japaridze, Liana Isakadze
1984	
1985	Vakhtang Abramishvili, Dodo Aleksidze, Tengiz Archvadze, Ana Kalandadze, Bidzina Kvernadze, Giga Lortkipanidze, Guram Mirianashvili, Anzor Salukvadze, Zurab Kapianidze, Giorgi Shengelaia, Jansugh Charkviani, Kakhi Khutsishvili, Levan Jandieri
1986	
1987	Aleksandr Mezhirov, Ucha Japaridze, Tsisana Tatishvili, Otar Taktakishvili, Merab Kokochashvili, Vakhtang Tsintsadze
1989	Mukhran Machavariani, Anzor Erkomaishvili, Odysseas Dimitriadis, Simon Virsaladze, Juna Mikatadze, Giorgi Shengelaia, Gogi Kharabadze, Boris Pasternak, Boris Gaponov
1990	
1991	
1992	Paata Burchuladze, Tariel Chanturia, Tamaz Chiladze
1993	Nino Ananiashvili, Ushangi Imerlishvili
1994	Grigol Abashidze, Chabua Amirejibi
1995	Teimuraz Babluani, Vakhtang Davitaia, Natela Iankoshvili, Ioseb Kechakmadze, Davit Mukeria, Gizo Zhordania, Tengiz Sukhishvili, Aleksandre Khomeriki
1996	
1997	
1998	Givi Gegechkori, Otar Ioseliani, Otar Megvinetukhutsesi, Revaz Mishveladze, Zurab Sotkilava, Eldar Shengelaia, Sofiko Chiaureli
1999	
2000	Lia Sturua, Nani Bregvadze, Nikoloz Ignatov, Revaz Gabriadze, Vakhtang Tabliashvili
2001	
2002	Besik Kharanauli
2003	Marine Iashvili, Kote Makharadze, Nana Pachkhuashvili
2004	
2005	Rezo Esadze, Lasha Tabukashvili, Besik Kharanauli
2006	Dimitri Eristavi, Revaz Chokhonelidze
2007	
2008	
2009	Iza Orjonikidze, Jibson Khundadze
2010	Kakhi Kavsadze, Ilia II
2011	Lado Ataneli, Nodar Gurabanidze, Tamaz Kvachantiradze
2012	Khatia Buniatishvili, Nikoloz Rachveli
2013	Magali Todua, Keti Matabeli, Shalva Mosidze
2014	
2015	Givi Berikashvili
2016	
2017	
2018	
2019	
2020	
2021	Makvala Gonashvili, Teimuraz Gotsadze, Vakhtang Kakhidze, Omar Nafetvaridze, Giorgi Japaridze, Raul Chilachava
