= Ambrolauri Museum of Fine Arts =

- Georgian: ამბროლაურის სახვითი ხელოვნების მუზეუმი
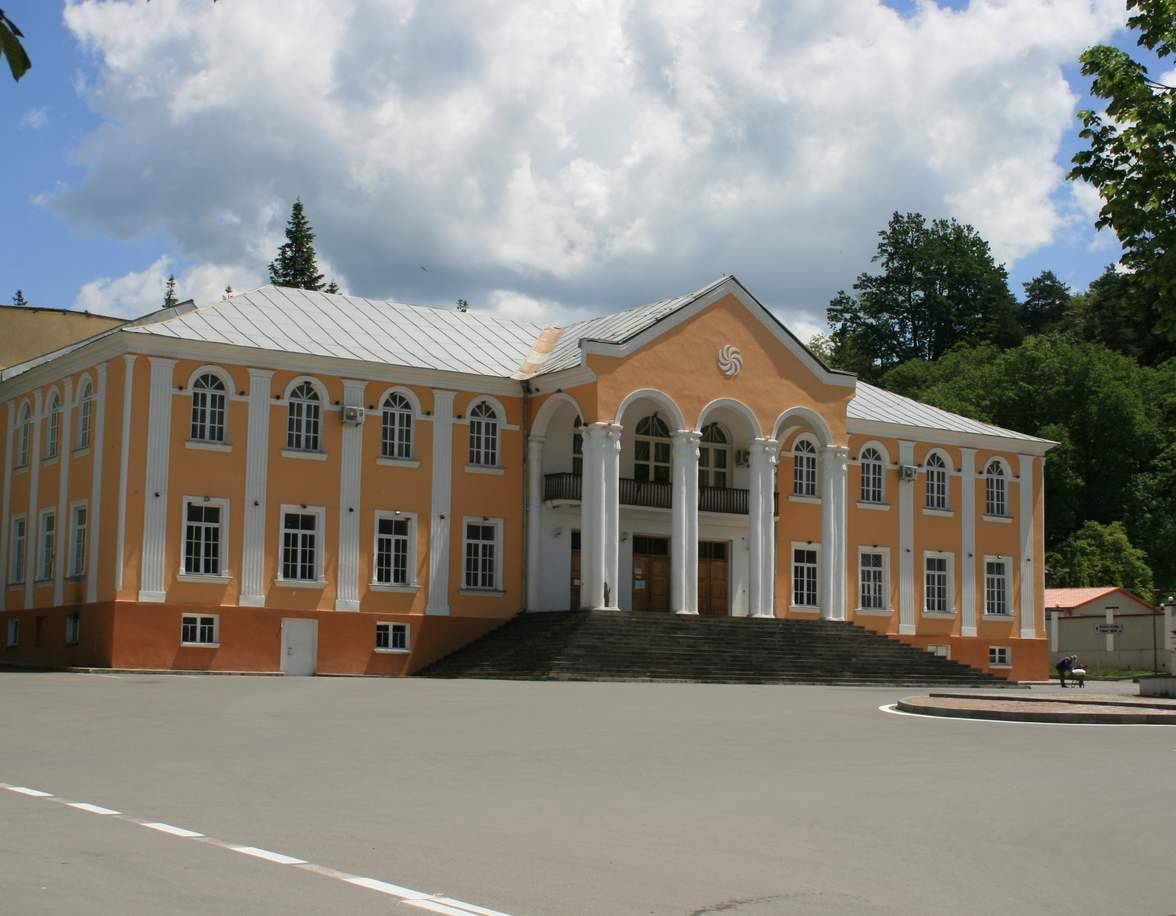
- Exterior view

- Location within Georgia
- Established: 1965
- Location: 4, Tamar Mepe str., 0400, Ambrolauri, Georgia
- Coordinates: 42.518861°N 43.153642°E
- Type: Art museum
- Collection size: 565
- Visitors: 800
- Owner: NNLS (Ambrolauri Centre of Culture)

The Ambrolauri Museum of Fine Arts was established in 1965, and is located in the regional capital of Racha-Lechkhumi and Kvemo Svaneti in Ambrolauri. The museum houses a collection of paintings and drawings by well-known Georgian artists of the 20th century: Lado Gudiashvili, Elene Akhvlediani, David Kakabadze, Ucha Japaridze, Koba Guruli, Avto Varazi, Levan Tsutskiridze, Natela Iankoshvili, etc. There are 565 stored items. More than 800 visitors visit annually.

== Other information ==
- Total space: 250 m^{2}
- Display space: 150 m^{2}
- Temporary exhibitions: 25 m^{2}
- Storage space: 50 m^{2}

The museum is open every day except Monday from 10:00 to 17:00. The entrance price is 1 GEL for adults and for students and schoolchildren - 0.5 GEL.
