= Mirian =

Mirian may refer to

- Mirian (given name)
- Tower of Mirian in Georgia
- Shah Nazar-e Mirian, a village in Iran
