= Tsutskiridze =

Tsutskiridze (Georgian: ცუცქირიძე) is a Georgian family name from the central-western Imereti region of Georgia.

== Notable members ==
- Giorgi Tsutskiridze (born 1996), Georgian rugby union player
- Levan Tsutskiridze (1926–2021), Georgian monumentalist artist, illustrator and painter
