= Ialoni =

Georgian women's vocal ensemble

- Choir
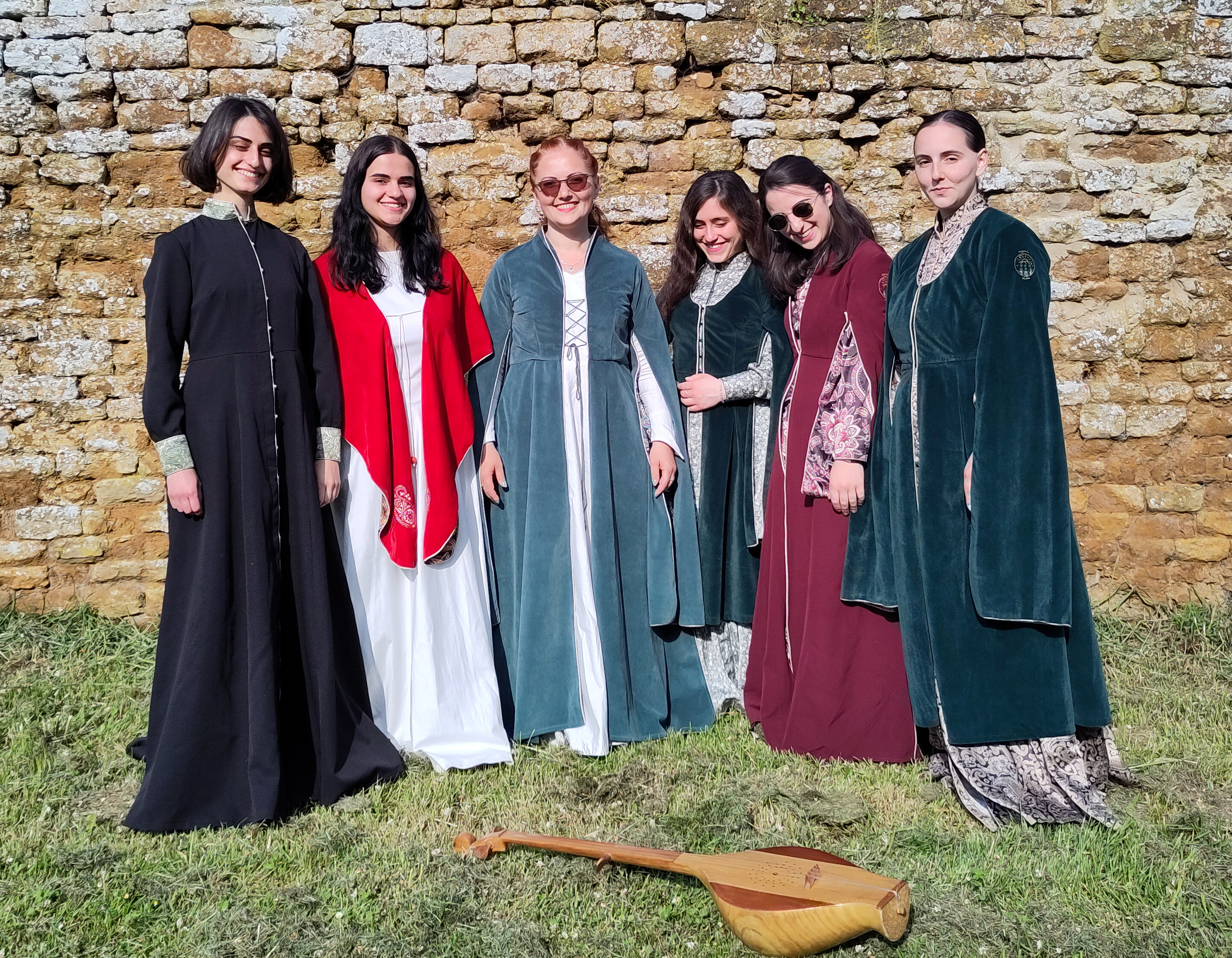
- Ialoni Ensemble visiting Chipping Warden, England
- Origin: Tbilisi, Georgia
- Founded: 2009
- Genre: Traditional Georgian Polyphony
- Music director: Nino Naneishvili
- Website: ialoni.com

Ialoni (Georgian: იალონი) is a women's vocal ensemble based in Tbilisi, Georgia, whose repertoire covers traditional Georgian polyphonic church chant, folk and urban genres. It has been led since its formation in 2009 by musicologist Nino Naneishvili, has performed internationally, and has won national awards for folk and church chant.

== History ==
The ensemble was founded in 2009 by Nino Naneishvili, initially with the aim of studying and popularizing Georgian sacred chant, in particular the female chant tradition. Their early repertoire drew on archive material from the National Centre of Manuscripts and the Chant Centre of the Georgian Patriarchy, and their second album, Ghmerti Upali and Sunday Hymns, 8 Tones, included part recordings of each hymn, to help other choirs to learn the pieces. The ensemble also draws on field recordings and published transcriptions, with a special focus on unusual and complex material. They have been pioneering the performance by women of pieces hitherto exclusively performed by male ensembles. Ialoni is part of the revival of Georgia's traditional sacred music, which has been emerging from its repression during Soviet rule.

In 2018, Ialoni began collaborating with London's Rose Bruford College of Theatre & Performance, and other UK-based choirs, sharing master classes and joint concerts.

In 2023, Ialoni toured the UK, giving workshops and performances, including a show at London's King's Place as part of the Songlines Encounters Festival.

== Etymology ==
The ensemble's name, Ialoni, is a Gurian and Imeretian dialect word meaning first light of day.

== Awards ==
The ensemble was awarded Best Female Folk Ensemble at the National Folklore Festival of Georgia 2015-2016, organized by the State Center of Folklore of Georgia and the Ministry of Culture and Monument Protection of Georgia.

At the 2017 Tbilisi Choral Music Competition, the choir was awarded the Grand Prix in Georgian Traditional Chant, and the first place and Gold Medal in Georgian Folk Song.

== Discography ==
The ensemble has released the following albums:

- Chants of Holy Mary, 2010
- Ghmerti Upali and Sunday Hymns, 8 Tones, (double CD), 2011
- From Sunrise to Sunset (CD & DVD), 2016
- I Fell in Love with that Sweet Voice, 2018
- Healing Songs and Lullabies, 2020
- Don't Think I Would Ever Forget You, 2021
- 50 Georgian Songs, 2022
- Georgian Christmas Traditional Chants, 2022

== Film and TV ==
The ensemble provided hymns for Nana Janelidze’s 2009 film Knights of Chant.

Two episodes of the Adjara State TV series Etnopori, which focuses on bearers of ethnic tradition, were dedicated to the choir.

In 2022, Ialoni filmed a concert and an interview for the Library of Congress.
