= Givi =

Givi can refer to:

- Kivi, Iran, a city in Iran
- Givi (name), Georgian given name
- Italian motorcycle accessory company, pronounced ‘Jee Vee’, founded by former Grand Prix motorcycle road racer Giuseppe Visenzi
- Mikhail Tolstykh, nicknamed Givi, Donbas military commander
