= Chkhikvadze =

Chkhikvadze (ჩხიკვაძე or Чхиквадзе) is a surname of Georgian origin. Notable people with this name include:

- Irakli Chkhikvadze (b. 1987), Georgian rugby player
- Keti Chkhikvadze (ქეთი ჩხიკვაძე), Georgian fashion designer
- Noe Chkhikvadze (1883–1920), Georgian poet
- Panteleimon Chkhikvadze (1903–1940), Soviet and Georgian writer
- Ramaz Chkhikvadze (რამაზ ჩხიკვაძე) (1928–2011), Georgian actor
- Vano Chkhikvadze (b. 1947), Georgian writer
- Viktor Chkhikvadze (1911–2006), Russian jurist
- Vladimir Chkhikvadze (b. 1950), former Russian ambassador to Chile
- Vyacheslav Chkhikvadze (1940–2019), Soviet herpetologist and paleontologist
