= Natalia Palavandishvili =

Georgian painter, graphic artist, and illustrator

Natalia Palavandishvili (Georgian: ნატალია ფალავანდიშვილი; 9 November 1921 – 2006) was a Georgian painter, graphic artist, and illustrator.

Palavandishvili studied at the Tbilisi State Academy of Fine Art, from which she graduated in 1945. Largely a portrait artist, she was associated for a portion of her career with Elene Akhvlediani. She also produced a series of paintings depicting views of Old Tbilisi. She specialized in watercolor and gouache, but she also worked in oils. Palavandishvili was named a People's Artist of Georgia in 1984, having already been named Meritorious Artist of Georgia in 1965.

Palavandishvili was the subject of a monograph published in 2016. Her work may be found in the collection of the Georgian Museum of Fine Arts.
