= List of Georgian films of the 1990s =

A list of the films produced in the cinema of Georgia in the 1990s, ordered by year of release:

| Title | Director | Cast | Genre | Studio/notes |
|---|---|---|---|---|
1990
1991
1992
| The Sun of the Sleepless | Temur Babluani | | | Won a Silver Bear at Berlin |
1993
1994
| Iavnana | Nana Janelidze | Nato Murvanidze | | |
1995
1996
| A Chef in Love | | | | |
1997
1998
1999
