= Ketevan Magalashvili =

Georgian painter and art conservator (1894–1973)

- Ketevan Magalashvili in 1922
- Born: 19 April 1894; Kutais, Russian Empire
- Died: 30 May 1973 (aged 79); Tbilisi, Georgian SSR, Soviet Union
- Known for: Painting, art conservation

Ketevan Konstantines asuli Magalashvili (Georgian: ქეთევან კონსტანტინესასული მაღალაშვილი; 19 April 1894 – 30 May 1973) was a Georgian and Soviet painter and art conservator.

== Biography ==
A native of Kutaisi, Magalashvili began her studies at the School of the Caucasian Society of Fine Arts, moving to Moscow in 1915 to study at the Moscow School of Painting, Sculpture and Architecture, where her instructors included Konstantin Korovin and Nikolay Kasatkin. She returned to Georgia in 1917; in 1921 she began working at the library of the National Gallery in Tbilisi, where Dimitri Shevardnadze became a supporter. She traveled to Paris in 1923, enrolling at the Académie Colarossi and remaining there until 1926. In Paris she moved in the same circles as Elene Akhvlediani, Lado Gudiashvili, and David Kakabadze, studying contemporary French art and developing her technique. Returning once again to Georgia, she became a conservator at the National Gallery, leaving the post after Shevardnadze's execution in 1937. She continued work as a painter, exhibiting with the Union of Artists for much of her career and gaining some notice for her portraits. She died in Tbilisi.

Work by Magalashvili is in the collection of the National Gallery of Georgia and in numerous private collections. She was the subject of a monograph published in 2016.
