= Givi (name) =

Givi (Georgian: გივი) is a masculine Georgian given name. It may refer to:

- Givi Amilakhvari (died 1700), Georgian nobleman
- Givi Amilakhvari (1689–1754), Georgian nobleman
- Givi Berikashvili, Georgian film and theatre actor
- Givi Chokheli, Georgian football player
- Givi Didava, Georgian footballer
- Givi Gachechiladze, Georgian composer and conductor
- Givi Gumbaridze, Georgian politician
- Givi Ioseliani, Georgian football player
- Givi Iukuridze, Georgian major general
- Givi Javakhishvili, Georgian politician
- Givi Kandareli, Georgian painter
- Givi Kartozia, Georgian Greco-Roman wrestler
- Givi Kvaratskhelia, Georgian football player
- Givi Toidze, Georgian artist and painter
