= Medea Japaridze =

Georgian–Soviet actor (1923–1994)

- მედეა ჯაფარიძე
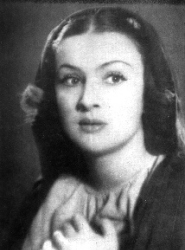
- Japaridze in the 1930s
- Born: 20 February 1923; Tiflis, Transcaucasian SFSR, USSR
- Died: 31 March 1994 (aged 71); Tbilisi, Georgia
- Resting place: Didube Pantheon
- Occupation: Actress
- Spouse: Revaz Tabukashvili
- Awards: People's Artist of the Georgian SSR

Medea Japaridze (Georgian: მედეა ჯაფარიძე; 20 February 1923 – 31 March 1994) was a Georgian and Soviet actress. In 1960 she was awarded the People's Artist of the Georgian SSR.

== Biography ==
Japaridze was born on 20 February 1923 in Tiflis, Transcaucasian SFSR (present-day Tbilisi, Georgia). In 1939, she graduated from Tbilisi VIII secondary school.

She worked for two years at the Folk Art Theater at Nadzaladevi. From 1942 till the end of her life, she was an actress at the Kote Marjanishvili Academic Theater. In the studio of the Rustaveli Theater she listened to Giorgi Tovstonogov's lecture course. Later she was sent to Vl. Nemirovich-Danchenko Studios in Moscow. Here Yuri Zavadsky invited her to the Mossovet Theater, where she played the role of Cleopatra in the Russian language in "Caesar and Cleopatra". She soon returned to her homeland and spent all her life in Georgian cinema.

At the Kote Marjanishvili theater she had many roles. Among them is Nina in (Mikhail Lermontov's "Masquerade"), Julieta, Beatrice, Lady Anna (William Shakespeare's Romeo and Juliet, Much ado about nothing, "Wounded Wife Murden", "Richard III"), drunken (M. Baratashvili's "Marine"), (Vazha Pshavela's "Cut"), Marta (Cassona's trees are overly loud), Varvara Karpovna (Kita Buchaidze's "Aavle's Dog"), Gulkani (P. Kakabadze's "Kakhaber Sword"), (Sophocles "Oedipus King"), Mother (Lasha Tabukashvili's "Old Waltz") and others.

In 1950, for the role of "Juragi Shield" she was awarded a Stalin prize. The same year she was awarded the title of the People's Artist of the Georgian SSR. Her films were screened at the National Archives of Georgia and at the Cannes Film Festival.

== Personal life ==
Japaridze was married to the film director and screenwriter Revaz Tabukashvili.

On 31 March 1994, Japaridze died in Tbilisi aged 71. Japaridze was buried at the Didube Pantheon.

== Filmography ==
- Giorgi Saakadze (1942)
- Keto and Kote (1948)
- The Color of Pomegranates (1969)
- Once Upon a Time There Was a Singing Blackbird (1970)
- Blue Mountains (1983)
