= Mirian Shvelidze =

Georgian artist (1947–2022)

Mirian Shvelidze (Georgian: მირიან შველიძე; 1 January 1947 – 9 February 2022) was a Georgian artist who designed over 100 theatrical plays at the Rustaveli Theatre in Tbilisi and at theatres in Moscow, Kyiv, Istanbul, Tel Aviv, Athens, Kutaisi, and Batumi. He was also a painter, and his work has been featured in modern art exhibitions. Shvelidze's most famous design work includes Robert Sturua's productions of "Kvarkvare", "Richard III", and "King Lear".

== Early life ==
Shvelidze was born in Tbilisi, Georgia. Unlike many artists, he was not immersed in art and design from an early age. His father was an average working-class man and his mother was a housewife; neither had any particular passion for art. During his childhood, his brother played the violin and his sister played the piano. Mirian, however, took an interest in drawing, which was not viewed as highly as musical pursuits at the time. He joined a small art club at school, through which he was able to interact with like-minded students. His father died when Mirian was 12 years old. From then on, his mother and grandmother raised him and his two siblings alone in a one-room home. The family ate beans five times a week because they could not afford anything else.

== Education ==
After completing school, Shvelidze applied to the painting faculty at Iakob Nikoladze Art College, where he would study from 1962 to 1965. Because admission to the painting faculty was highly competitive, he started in the graphic design faculty. When he was eventually admitted to the painting faculty, he found that he was restricted to painting compositions, peasants, or constructions. When he observed an older generation of theatrical artists, he noticed that they had more freedom. He switched to the art faculty and started working on independent themes.

In 1971, Shvelidze graduated from the Tbilisi Art Academy.

== Rustaveli Theatre ==
One day while still at university, Shvelidze was visited by friends who were artists at the Rustaveli Theatre. Upon seeing some of the works he had created for his dissertation, these friends offered him a position as an artist at the theatre. Had it not been for this chance meeting, Shvelidze has said, he might have pursued a different type of art.

== Personal life and death ==
Shvelidze died on 9 February 2022, at the age of 75.

== Famous works ==
- "Kvarkvare" (1973)
- "A Woman's Burden" (1977)
- "Shushanikis Martviloba" (1978)
- "Lord of Darkness" (1979)
- "Richard III" (1979)
- "A Wonderful Georgian Woman" (1981)
- "King Lear" (1987)
- "Life Is a Dream" (1992)
- "Szechuanese King Person" (1993)
- "Iakob's Testament" (1994)
- "Lamara" (1996)
- "Is He a Human This Man" (2000)
- "Hamlet" (2001)
- "Waiting for Godot" (2002)
- "Darispan's Misfortunes" (2006)
- "The Broken Jug" (2015)

== Awards and Accolades ==
In 1980, Shvelidze was named an Achieved Artist of Georgia. A year later, he received a design award from the Rustaveli Theatre for his work on a production of William Shakespeare's "Richard III". In 1981 he was awarded the Shota Rustaveli Prize.

He was named a chief artist at the Rustaveli Theatre in 1996. That same year, he received a State Award and a Gold Award Grand Prize from the Rustavi International Festival for his work on a production of "Macbeth".

In 1997, he received the King Abashidze Award for his work on a production of the opera "Absalom and Eteri". In 1998, he received the grand prize for artistic design from the Baltic House Festival Theatre in Saint Petersburg.
