= Mirian (given name) =

Mirian (Georgian: მირიან) is a masculine Georgian given name that may refer to:

- Mirian I (fl. 2nd-century BC), king of Iberia
- Mirian II (c. 90–20 BC), king of Iberia
- Mirian III (b. 277 or 258), king of Iberia
- Mirian of Kakheti (fl. 8th century), Georgian ruler
- Prince Mirian of Georgia (1767–1834), Georgian royal prince
- Mirian Giorgadze (born 1976), Georgian wrestler
- Mirian Modebadze (born 1997), Georgian rugby union player
- Mirian Shvelidze (1947–2022), Georgian artist
- Mirian Tsalkalamanidze (1927–2000), Georgian wrestler
- Mirian Burduli (born 1991), Georgian rugby union player
- Mirian Melua (born 1942), French-Georgian engineer and journalist
