= Iavnana (film) =

- Directed by: Nana Janelidze
- Written by: Nana Janelidze, Nino Natroshvili
- Starring: Nato Murvanidze, Niko Tavadze, Nino Abuladze
- Cinematography: Giorgi Beridze
- Music by: Jansug Kakhidze, Vakhtang Kakhidze
- Release date: 1994
- Country: Georgia
- Language: Georgian

Iavnana (Georgian: იავნანა) is a 1994 Georgian film directed by Nana Janelidze. The plot concerns the relationship between two parents and their daughter, who has amnesia after a long separation.

In 2014 the film was added to the collection of 76 feature films preserved in the National Archives of Georgia.

== Awards ==
- Georgian State Prize
- Iakob Gogebashvili Educational Prize

== See also ==
- Iavnana
- List of Georgian films of the 1990s
