= Revaz Tabukashvili =

Soviet film director and screenwriter

Revaz Shalva Tabukashvili
- Born: 2 August 1927; Tbilisi, Georgia SSR
- Died: 5 August 1990 (aged 63); Tbilisi, Georgia SSR
- Education: Moscow State Institute of International Relations
- Occupations: Film director; writer; illustrator
- Years active: 1950–1992
- Spouse: Medea Japaridze (m. 1949–1990)
- Awards: Honored Art Worker of the USSR; Shota Rustaveli State Prize

Revaz Shalva Tabukashvili (Rezo) (Georgian: რევაზ თაბუკაშვილი; 2 August 1927 – 5 August 1990) was a Soviet film director and screenwriter.

== Early life and education ==
He was born on August 2, 1927, in Tbilisi, Georgia. In 1949 he graduated from Moscow State Institute of International Relations.

His poetry and translations were being published since 1940. In 1960s-70s, he was considered as one of the best translators of William Shakespeare's sonnets. His plays were regularly performed in Tbilisi's Rustaveli Theatre. He was the author of librettos in operas.

He discovered Georgian manuscripts and important documents in different libraries and archives of the world. Because of him most of those important manuscripts, documents, letters, and pictures were returned in Georgia.

He died on August 5, 1990, and buried in Didube Pantheon.

== Personal life ==
He was married to Medea Japaridze, a Soviet actress of Georgian origin.

== Awards and honors ==
- Honored Art Worker of the USSR (1967)
- Shota Rustaveli State Prize (1981)
- A main street in the downtown Tbilisi is named as Revaz Tabukashvili Street.
