= Ia Arsenishvili =

Georgian painter (born 1971)

Ia Arsenishvili (Georgian: ია არსენიშვილი) (born 3 March 1971) is a Georgian painter.

A native of Tbilisi, Arsenishvili graduated from Tbilisi State University in 1994; the following year she graduated from the Tbilisi State Academy of Arts. From 1992 until 1994 she was employed as an animator by the Georgian national film studio. During her career she has shown work in numerous exhibits both at home and abroad. In 2021 her work was included in Work-Show 1: Georgian Women Artists in Berlin. She has received a number of awards during her career. Several of her paintings may be found in the collection of the Georgian Museum of Fine Arts.
