= Tsisana Tatishvili =

Georgian operatic soprano and educator

Tsisana Tatishvili (Georgian: ცისანა ტატიშვილი; 1939–2017) was a Georgian operatic soprano and educator who performed at the Tbilisi Opera from 1963 to 2000. People's Artist of the USSR. She also sang at the Bolshoi Theatre in Moscow and at the Komische Oper in Berlin. Her roles included Desdemona in Otello, Ortuda in Lohengrin and the title roles in Tosca and Salome. On retiring from the stage, she was active as a voice teacher.

== Biography ==
Born in Tbilisi on 30 December 1937, Tatishvili studied voice at the State Conservatory under Gulnara Kartvelishvili, graduating in 1963. Until 2000, she was a soloist at the Tbilisi Opera and Ballet Theatre but also performed abroad, especially in Moscow and Berlin. As a concert performer, she sang the Ode to Joy in Beethoven's 9th Symphony and Verdi's Requiem as well as works by the Georgian composers Otar Taktakishvili and Aleksandre Machavariani.

Operatic roles included Maro in Zacharia Paliashvili's Daisi, Tamar in Taktakishvili's The Abduction of the Moon, Liza in Tchaikovsky's The Queen of Spades, Desdemona in Otello, Ortuda in Lohengrin, Santuzza in Mascagni's Cavalleria rusticana and the title roles in Tosca, Eboli (Don Carlo), Amneris (Aida) and Salome. On retiring from the stage, she became a voice teacher and served on committees promoting opera in Georgia.

== Awards ==
A Fellow of the Georgian Academy, Tatishvili was honoured with many awards, including the title People's Artist of the Georgian SSR in 1973, the Shota Rustaveli Prize in 1987, the Presidential Order of Excellence (1979) and the Georgian Order of Honour (2012).
