= Esma Oniani =

Esma Oniani (Georgian: ესმა ონიანი; 20 July 1938 – 31 January 1999) was a Georgian poet, essayist, and painter.

== Biography ==
Esma Oniani was born 20 July 1938. A Tbilisi native, she studied at the Academy of Fine Arts of her native city from 1957 until 1963; The School-Leavers, which she produced upon her graduation, was sent to a student exhibition in Moscow. She participated in numerous exhibitions during her career while working as an artistic director for the state television company. From 1968 she held a position teaching painting at her alma mater. She illustrated many books as well, such as Erlom Akhvlediani's children's work The Story of a Little Mouse. Oniani began publishing her writing in 1968; she dealt with such taboo topics as religion and erotic subjects, and soon caused a sensation with her work. Nevertheless, although several collections of her work were published, she was publicly noted more for her artistic endeavors than her writing, which circulated mostly privately; it was only after her death that her poetry began to receive wider attention.

Oniani exhibited her work both domestically and abroad during her career, receiving plaudits including a medal from an exhibition in Japan. She won a medal from the Artists' Union for her portrait of David Kakabadze in 1982. She received the Georgian State Prize posthumously in 2000. Some of her writing has been translated into German and published, and several of her paintings may be found in the collection of the Georgian Museum of Fine Arts.

== Bibliography ==
List from:

- Is that me? This one too? I’m back again? Artanuji Publishing, 2015
- Souls incinerated in Fire, Saunje Publishing, 2013
- From Old Notebooks, Intelekti Publishing, 2011
- 100 Poems, Intelekti Publishing, 2010,
- What I Don’t Forget, Publishing House Merani, 1998
- White Visitors, Sov. Georgia Publishing, 1986
- Birds Soaring Quietly, Publishing House Merani, 1982
- Poems, Publishing House Merani, 1978
