= Odysseas Dimitriadis =

Greek conductor (1908–2005)

Odysseas Dimitriadis ოდისეი დიმიტრიადი
- Born: July 7, 1908; Batumi, Russian Empire (present-day Georgia)
- Died: April 28, 2005 (aged 96) Tbilisi, Georgia
- Genre: Classical
- Occupation: conductor
- Instrument: Singing
- Award: Shota Rustaveli Prize (1989)

Odysseas Dimitriadis (Note: Georgian: ოდისეი დიმიტრიადი, romanized: Odisei Dimit'riadi; Greek: Οδυσσέας Δημητριάδης, romanized: Odysseas Dēmētriadēs; Russian: Одиссей Ахиллесович Димитриади, romanized: Odissey Akhillesovich Dimitriadi) (7 July 1908 – 28 April 2005) was a Georgian of Pontic Greek descent and Soviet classical music conductor. During his 70-year career, Odysseas had conducted a number of the world's leading orchestras, as well as being a main conductor of Georgia, USSR state orchestra and the Bolshoy Theatre orchestra. In 1980 he conducted during the opening and closing ceremony of the 1980 Summer Olympics, held in Moscow. He has received a number of awards and titles, including Ambassador of Hellenism, People's Artist of the USSR, and Golden Medal of Athens.

== Biography ==
Dimitriadis was born in Batumi to a Pontic Greek family. His father was Achilles (came to Batumi from Trapezund in 1886), and his mother was Kalliopi Ephremidi.

He was not even five years old, when a passion to music became visible. He tried to play favorite melodies on piano, without any knowledge of music notation. Systematic studies of music began in 1918, when young Odysseas became a student of great violinist Tizengausen. Unfortunately, Tizengausen had to emigrate. The new teacher was also great violinist and composer - Legher.

The main problem of his youth was that his father was a "lishents", a man who had a private property (completely forbidden during the early Soviet years). That was the reason why his father advised Odysseas to move to Sukhumi, where his elder brother Nikolaos lived and was on the state duty, right after graduating from the gymnasium in 1925.

After a year spent in Sukhumi, Odysseas arrived to Tbilisi, where he entered the conservatory.

== Chronology ==
- 1926-1930 - studied in Tbilisi conservatory. Musical theory and composition class.1930-1933 - became a head teacher in Sukhumi musical college.
  1933-1936 - studied in Leningrad conservatorie. Conducting class of Aleksandr Gauk and Ilya Musin.
  Dimitri Mitropoulos - "one of the greatest conductors of the world", as Shostakovich had expressed, came to Leningrad to conduct 10 concerts. Odysseas got the most important influence and inspiration.
  1937-1965 - leading conductor of the Zakharia Paliashvili Tbilisi Opera and Ballet Theater. Professor of Tbilisi Conservatory.
  1958 - Honored with the title People's Artist of the USSR
  1959 - visited Greece as the head of the organization of USSR - Greece cultural relations. Met his brothers and sisters, who had emigrated to Greece 30 years earlier.
  1965-1973 - leading conductor of the Bolshoi Theater. Became worldwide famous, as the State Orchestra of the USSR, under his leadership, does an international tour. At the same time he was a professor of the Moscow Conservatory.
  1973 - returned to Georgia. Till the retirement in 1991 he was the main conductor of Georgia, as well as professor of the Tbilisi Conservatory.
  1980 - Was honored to conduct during the opening and closing ceremonies of the 1980 Summer Olympics, held in Moscow.

== International activity ==
After 1974 revolution in Greece, Odysseas Dimitriadis annually visited his historical motherland. In Greece, he conducted different orchestras, established international relations. Took a very important part in the propaganda of Greek composers, such as Manolis Kalomiris, Spyridon Samaras, Antiochos Evangelatos and Mikis Theodorakis on international scene.

On April 9, 1989, the mayor of Athens Miltiadis Evert, honored Odysseas with a Golden Medal of Athens.
In 1998 he was awarded the "Ambassador of Hellenism" honorary distinction.

== List of orchestras conducted ==
During his seven-decade career, Odysseas conducted over one hundred orchestras from different continents. Among them included:

State Symphony Orchestra of the USSR
State Symphony Orchestra of Greece
Symphony orchestra of the Bolshoy Theatre
Vienna Symphony Orchestra
Tbilisi Opera Orchestra
Tbilisi Symphony Orchestra
Athens State Symphony Orchestra
Thessaloniki State Symphony Orchestra
Berlin Symphony Orchestra
Prague Symphony Orchestra
Hungarian National Philharmonic Orchestra
St. Petersburg Philharmonic Orchestra
Bucharest Symphony Orchestra
Orquesta Estable del Teatro Colón, Buenos Aires (Argentina)

== Last years ==
Maestro Dimitriadis spent his last years both in Athens and in Tbilisi. He did rare performances, and public appearances (mostly in Tbilisi, with Jansug Kakhidze).

On April 28, 2005, 97 years old Dimitriadis died in his home in Tbilisi. He was buried with honor near the Opera and Ballet Theatre in Tbilisi, on the main avenue of the city. Prime Minister and Culture Minister Costas Karamanlis said in a statement that Odysseas Dimitriadis "had the unique privilege in his long life to speak with the inter-cultural language of music to the hearts of the peoples of the then Soviet Union, of Greece and Georgia."
