= Mukhran Machavariani =

Georgian poet

Mukhran Machavariani მუხრან მაჭავარიანი
- Born: April 2, 1929; Sachkhere Municipality, Transcaucasian SFSR, Soviet Union
- Died: May 17, 2010 (aged 81); Tbilisi, Georgia
- Occupation: Poet
- Writing career
- Notable awards: Shota Rustaveli Prize (1989)

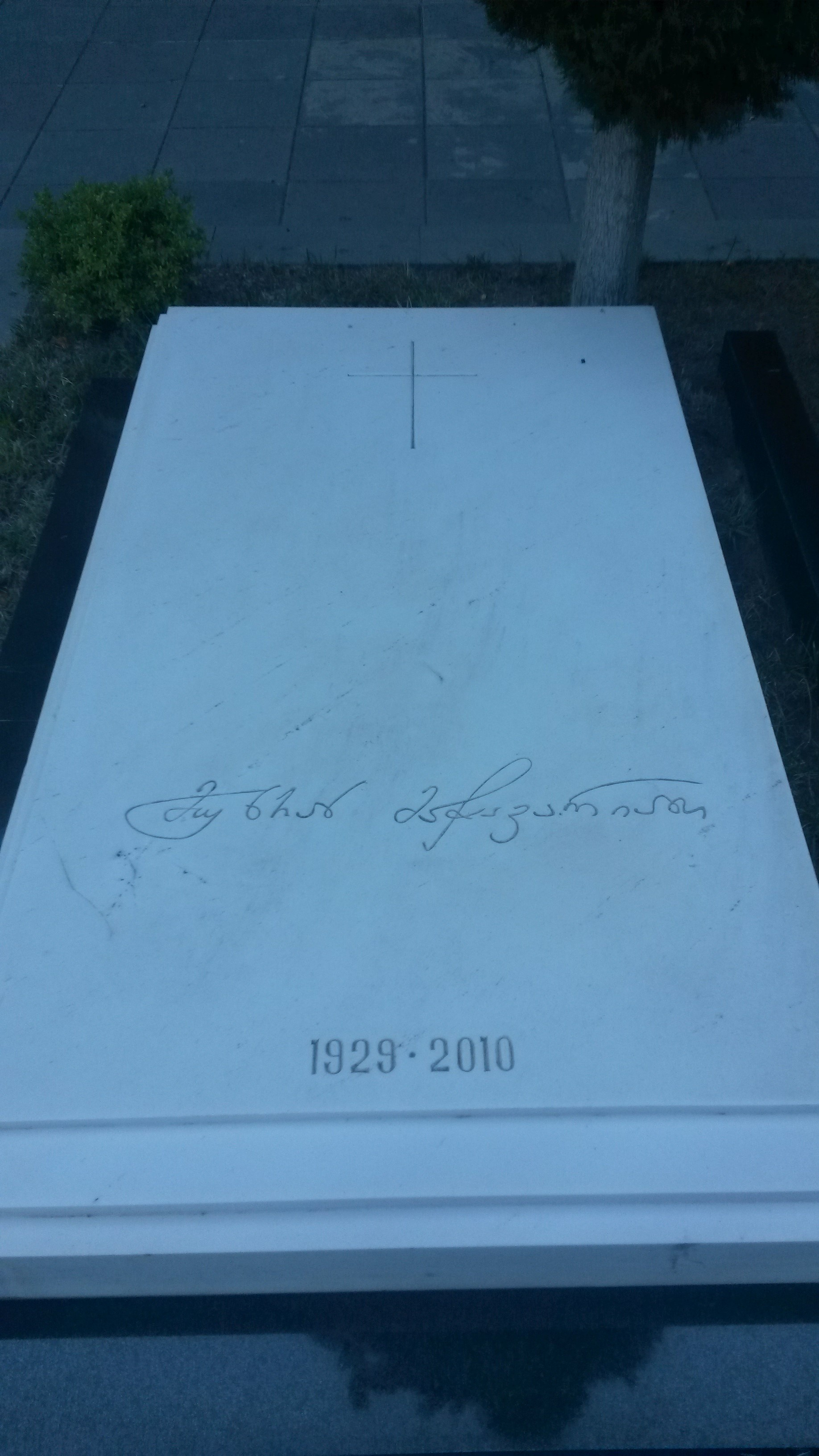
Mukhran Machavariani tomb at Mtatsminda Pantheon

Mukhran Machavariani (Georgian: მუხრან მაჭავარიანი; April 12, 1929 – May 17, 2010) was a Georgian poet, a member of the Supreme Council of the Republic of Georgia (Georgian Parliament) from 1990 until 1992, and a recipient of the Shota Rustaveli Prize of Georgia. From 1988 until 1990 he was the Chairman of the Union of Georgian Writers. He died during a performance at Rustaveli Theatre in Tbilisi.

== Education ==
In 1954 graduation at the Philology Department of Ivane Javakhishvili Tbilisi University.

== Works ==
- Poems (1955),
- The Red Sun and the Green Grass
- Silence Without You (1958).

Translations

- Boy, Don't Embarrass Me!
- Extraordinary by Its Ordinariness
- 100 Poems
