= Guram Kutateladze =

Georgian painter

Guram (Khita) Kutateladze (Georgian: გურამ (ხიტა) ქუთათელაძე; March 29, 1924 – November 29, 1979) was a 20th-century Georgian painter. He received numerous honors including the title Honoured Visual Artist of the Georgian SSR and the Rustaveli Prize. He studied at the Moscow School of Painting, Sculpture and Architecture (1940-1942, 1946) and the Tbilisi State Academy of Arts (1942-1946).

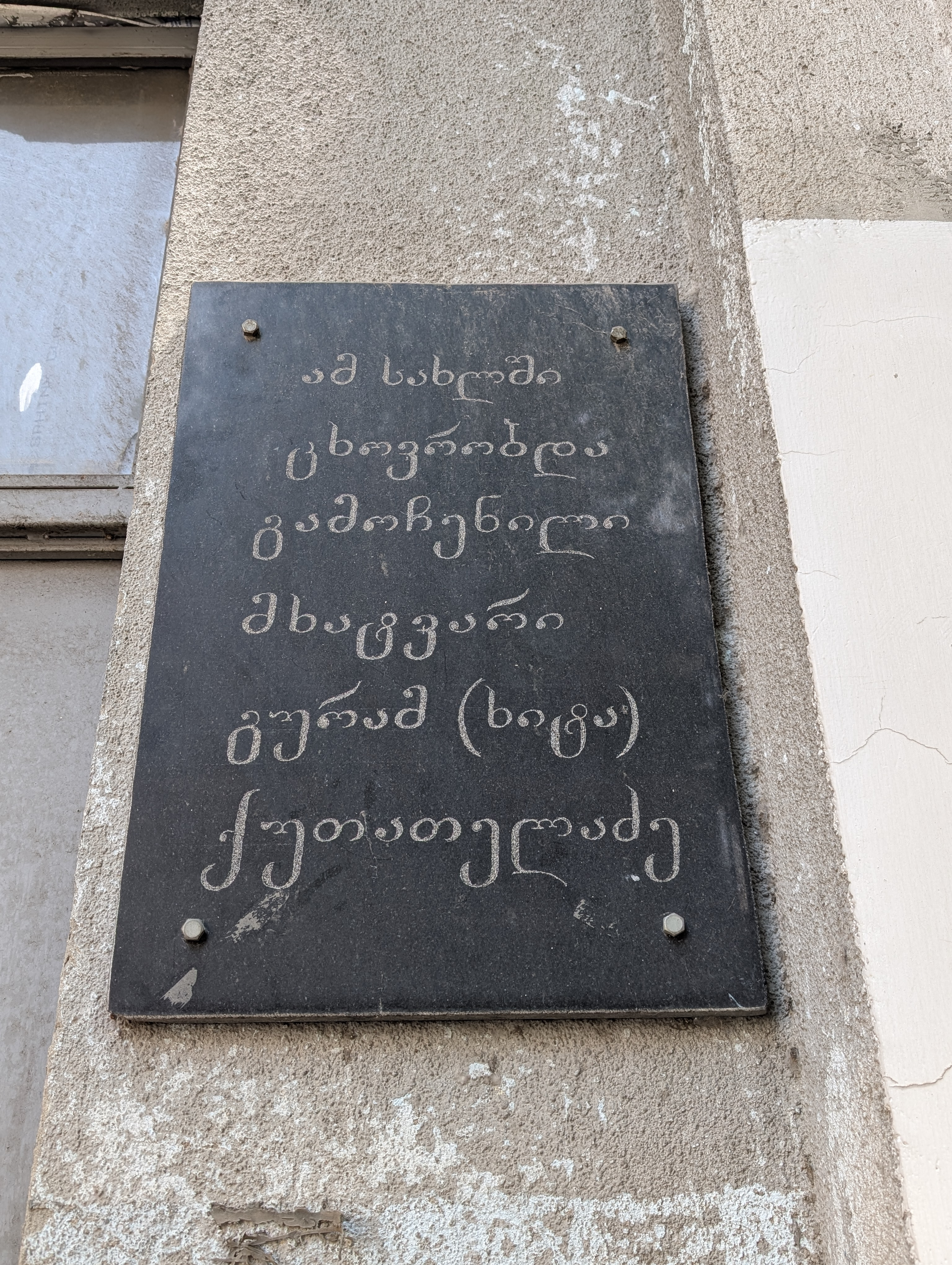
Rectangular stone plaque on the wall of a house (4 Lado Kavsadze St., Tbilisi) in memory of Guram (Khita) Kutateladze

- ლეჟავა, სამსონ (2016) "გურამ ქუთათელაძე". Lezhava, Samson "Guram Kutateladze". pp.17–49. Tbilisi / ISBN 978-9941-0-8580-2 (Georgian)
- ანდრიაძე, დავით (2011) "ხიტა ქუთათელაძე". Andriadze, David "Hita Kutateladze". pp.7-46. Tbilisi / ISBN 978-9941-0-3189-2 (Georgian)
