= Vakhtang Kakhidze =

Georgian composer, conductor (b. 1959)

- Born: March 23, 1959; Tbilisi, Georgia
- Origin: Georgian
- Genres: Classical music, Symphony, Opera, Georgian contemporary music, Folklore
- Occupations: Conductor, Pianist Composer
- Years active: 1983–present
- Website: http://www.kakhidzemusiccenter.com

Vakhtang (Vato) Kakhidze (Georgian: ვახტანგ (ვატო) კახიძე; Russian: Вахтанг Кахидзе; born 23 March 1959 in Tbilisi) is a Georgian composer and conductor. He is the son of conductor Jansug Kakhidze. He graduated and postgraduated from the Moscow State Conservatory. He studied composition with Nikolai Sidelnikov and orchestration with Edison Denisov. Kakhidze is the conductor of Tbilisi Symphony Orchestra since 1993.

== Biography ==
Vakhtang Kakhidze was born into a family of Jansug Kakhidze in 1959 in Tbilisi, Georgia. He began to study music when he was 6 years old, as a pianist. In 1975 he finished choir conducting department of Music High School. In 1981 he graduated from Moscow State Conservatory as a composer, and in 1983 he finished the post graduate courses of the same institute. His teachers were such famous musicians as Nikolai Sidelnikov - composition, Edison Denisov - art of instrumentation and others. In 1988-89 he studied conducting with his father, world-famous Georgian conductor Jansug Kakhidze.

In 1989, Vakhtang Kakhidze began conducting. His debut took place in Georgian National Opera and Ballet Theater of Tbilisi, where he has conducted several performances of his ballet “Amazons”. From 1993 he worked as conductor of Tbilisi Symphony Orchestra. Beside concert performances he recorded 25 CDs for famous international sound-recording companies. In 2002 Vakhtang Kakhidze was appointed a chief conductor of Tbilisi Symphony Orchestra and Artistic Director of Jansug Kakhidze Tbilisi Centre for Music & Culture. Also, he leads annual International Music Festival “Autumn Tbilisi”, which hosts famous musicians all over the world.

== Performers ==
Kakhidze's music has been performed by prestigious soloists like Gidon Kremer, Kremerata Baltica, or Yuri Bashmet although he has premiered in Tbilisi the most of his production. His music came to be known after the release of Happy Birthday by Kremerata Baltica which was reviewed as a "straightforward delights" by BBC Music Magazine

== Works ==
In 2004 Vakhtang Kakhidze had concert tour with Tbilisi Symphony orchestra in Russia and Italy performing in such leading concert halls as Moscow Conservatory Big Hall and St. Petersburg Philharmony, Milan Conservatory Verdi Concert Hall, Santa Cecilia Music Academy new concert hall in Rome, Merano, Bari and other cities.

Vakhtang Kakhidze performed with such well-known music ensembles as: Prague Symphony Orchestra, Symphony Orchestra “New Russia” Beijing Symphony Orchestra, Kiev Symphony Orchestra, Paris Trinity Church Choir and Orchestra, Israel Chamber Orchestra, The Israel Camerata (Jerusalem), Ensemble del Arte (Germany), chamber orchestras “Moscow Soloists” and “Kremerata Baltica”.

Vakhtang Kakhidze collaborates with such outstanding musicians as Nino Surguladze, Nino Machaidze, Jan Garbarek, Zurab Sotkilava, Natalia Gutman, Michel Lethiec, Lisa Batiashvili, Francois Leleux, Eliso Virsaladze, Liana Isakadze, Alexander Toradze, Alexander Korsantia, José Carreras, Michel Legrand, Gidon Kremer, Yuri Bashmet, Didie Lockwood, Alexander Kniazev, Lado Ataneli, Iano Tamar, Viktor Tretjakov, and many others.

As composer Vakhtang Kakhidze works in different musical genres. His pieces are performed in Moscow, Petersburg, Poland, Bulgaria, Slovakia, Hungary, Finland, UK, Greece, Spain, France, Italy, Germany, Switzerland, the Netherlands, Turkey, Israel, India, the United States and Japan. He is an author of soundtracks for films and drama performances, several jazz compositions and pop songs.

== Selected works ==
- Lullaby for mixed chorus (1975)
- Hymn for men's octet (1976)
- Psalm for 3 flutes and tenor (1977)
- String Quartet (1978-1979)
- Concerto for piano and orchestra (1980)
- Flower of Hope, Cantata for mezzo-soprano, tenor, baritone and chamber orchestra (1981)
- In Memoriam for string orchestra (1982)
- Reflections for men's octet and acoustic guitar (1983)
- Conjugations for symphony orchestra (1983)
- Barbale, Opera in 2 acts (1985-1986)
- Amazons, Ballet in 3 acts (1988-1989)
- Sheherazade, Music for ballet performance (1994)
- Alleluja for cello, voice and organ (1994)
- Moon Dances for cello and chamber orchestra (1994)
- Bruderschaft for viola, piano and string orchestra (1996)
- Reve d'ombre, Jazz Cantata for mixed chorus and jazz instruments (1998)
- Amazons, Symphonic Suite from the ballet (1998)
- Kyrie Eleison for brass band (1999)
- Blitz, Fantasy on Georgian Tunes for violin, voice, synthesizer and string orchestra
- 2000, Cantate de la paix for soprano, tenor, mixed chorus and symphony orchestra (2000)

Film scores

- 1983 Banditi aguris qarkhnidan
- 1984 Tu girtkamen - gaiqetsi
- 1985 Vin aris meotkhe?
- 1989 Shemsrulebeli 977
- 1989 Besame
- 1991 Utskinari
- 1994 Express - Information
- 1994 Iavnana
- 2000 Nutsas skola
- 2000 Midjachvuli raindebi
- 2007 The Russian Triangle

== Awards ==
- 1981 - First prize at the former USSR competition of young composer
- 1997 - Special prize “Spring”, instituted by Tbilisi Municipality for achievements in the art
- The prize instituted by Georgian Cinema Academy for the best film music
- 1998, 2005 and 2013 - Prize of the Georgian Theatre Union for the best music composed for drama performance
- 2000 – “Order of Honour” - The State award of Republic of Georgia
- 2010 – “Shota Rustaveli Prize” - The supreme award in Art of Republic of Georgia
