= Ana Shalikashvili =

Georgian painter (b. 1919, d. 2004)

Ana Shalikashvili (Georgian: ანა შალიკაშვილი; February 16, 1919 – March, 2004) was a Georgian painter.

== Early years ==
Ana Shalikashvili was born in Kutaisi in 1919.

== Education ==
In 1937–1942 she studied oil painting under the guidance of David Kakabadze and Valerian Sidamon-Eristavi and drawing under the tutorship of Tamar Abakelia and Sergo Kobuladze at the Tbilisi State Academy of Arts, and later went on to work at the Kutaisi Theater.

== Career and achievements ==
After having returned to Tbilisi in 1947, she was employed by the Georgian Film Studio as an animator at first and then as an art director. In the 1950s, she carried out productive work in the area of illustrations for children's books.

In the late 1950s, Ana Shalikashvili, on Elene Akhvlediani's invitation, joined a group of artists who traveled throughout Georgia and, based on their immediate impressions, created sketches of landscapes characteristic of different regions, and drawings portraying Old and New Tbilisi. Shalikashvili's oil and graphic compositions boast expressive imagery and high-level artistic skills.

Ana Shalikashvili, along with other artists from Elene Akhvlediani's group, fostered the creative development of female Georgian graphic artists.

Tbilisi History Museum opened on 12 March 2009 the first personal exhibition of Ana Shalikashvili dedicated to painter's 90th anniversary.
