= Once Upon a Time There Was a Singing Blackbird =

- Directed by: Otar Iosseliani
- Written by: Dimitri Eristavi; Otar Iosseliani; Sh. Kakichashvili; Semyon Lungin; Otar Mekhrishvili; Ilya Nusinov
- Produced by: Zurab Chkheidze; J. Gvenetadze
- Starring: Gela Kandelaki; Gogi Chkheidze; Jansug Kakhidze; Medea Japaridze
- Cinematography: Abessalom Maisuradze
- Edited by: Julietta Bezuashvili
- Music by: Temur Bakuradze
- Production company: Qartuli Pilmi
- Release date: July 11, 1970 (Soviet Union)
- Running time: 85 minutes
- Country: Soviet Union
- Languages: Georgian, Russian

Once Upon a Time There Was a Singing Blackbird (Georgian: იყო შაშვი მგალობელი (Iko shashvi mgalobeli)) is a 1970 Soviet musical comedy-drama film.

== Plot ==
Gia is a percussionist with an orchestra in Tbilisi. He still lives with his mother. He occasionally finds time to talk to people, but it never lasts and he always has to hurry back to the orchestra.

== Cast ==
- Gela Kandelaki as Gia Agladze
- Gogi Chkheidze
- Jansug Kakhidze as Conductor
- Medea Japaridze
