= Jansug Kakhidze =

Georgian conductor (1935–2002)

Jansug Kakhidze ჯანსუღ კახიძე
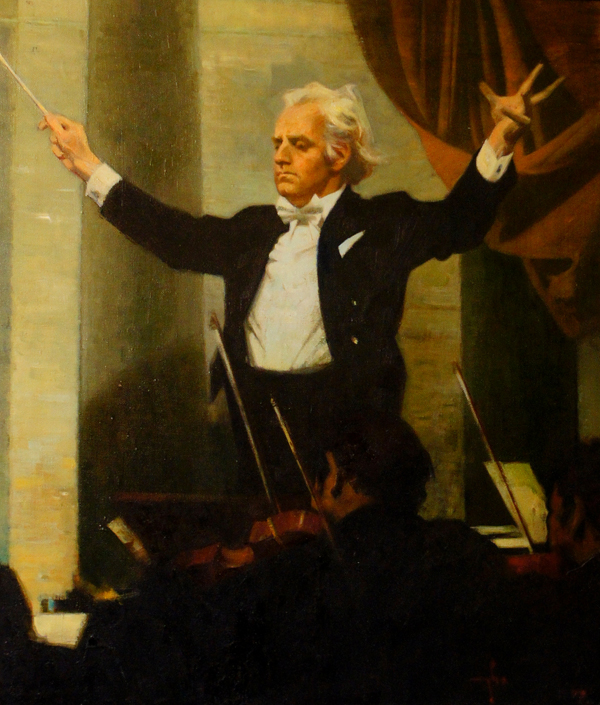
- Portrait by Ucha Japaridze, 1979

Background information
- Born: May 26, 1935; Tbilisi, Georgian SSR, Soviet Union
- Died: March 7, 2002 (aged 66) Tbilisi, Georgia
- Genres: Classical
- Occupations: Conductor; music director
- Instrument: Singing
- Years active: 1957–2002
- Website: http://www.kakhidzemusiccenter.com

Jansug Ivanes dze Kakhidze (Note: Georgian: ჯანსუღ ივანეს ძე კახიძე, romanized: Jansugh Ivanes dze K’akhidze; Russian: Джансуг Иванович Кахидзе, romanized: Dzhansug Ivanovich Kakhidze) (26 May 1935 – 7 March 2002) was a Georgian musician, composer, singer and conductor nicknamed "the Georgian Karajan". Kakhidze was music director of the Georgian State Symphony Orchestra for two decades beginning in 1973. He is the father of composer and conductor Vakhtang Kakhidze.

== Musical career ==
In 1958, Kakhidze graduated from the Choir Conducting department of the Tbilisi State Conservatory. In 1963 he completed the post-graduate courses for Opera and Symphony Orchestra Conducting under Professor Odysseas Dimitriadis at the same institution. Later he had training in Moscow with the Ukrainian/French conductor Igor Markevitch.

From 1982 until 2002 Djansug Kakhidze was the Artistic Director and Chief Conductor of the Tbilisi Opera and Ballet Theatre. Opera performances released under his direction included Salome, Don Giovanni, Boris Goduno, Il trovatore, Otello, Rigoletto, Cavalleria rusticana, Gianni Schicchi, L'elisir d'amore, The Queen of Spades, The Fiery Angel, The Love for Three Oranges, Duenj, Abesalom and Eteri, and Music for the living.

In 1989, Kakhidze founded a new hall for symphony music in Tbilisi, which included the Tbilisi Center for Music and Culture. He established the first professional boys' choir in Tbilisi at this center in 2000, further developing the classical performing arts in Georgia.

In 1993, Kakhidze founded the new Tbilisi Symphony Orchestra, and led it until his death in 2002.

Noted for his innovative program and devotion to contemporary works from his homeland, Kakhidze gained recognition during his life as a close friend and strong advocate of composer Giya Kancheli, recording his entire cycle of seven symphonies, along with many other works.

Highlights of Kakhidze's career included numerous appearances conducting throughout Europe and Australia. His performance of Berlioz's Damnation of Faust with the Orchestre de Paris in 1990 drew high praise from critics, and helped him to secure further international success in places such as the United States, where appeared as a guest conductor with both the Boston Symphony Orchestra and the National Symphony Orchestra.

== Filmography ==
=== Composer ===
- 1974 – The Eccentrics (with Giya Kancheli)
- 1974 – Watermelon (Animation film)
- 1974 – Ra-Ni-Na (Animation film)
- 1974 – Bet (Short film)
- 1975 – The first swallow
- 1975 – Valse on the Mtatsminda (Short film)
- 1976 – Thermometer (Short film)
- 1976 – Tree Manetis (Short film)
- 1976 – Ivanika and Simonika
- 1976 – Trip to Tbilisi
- 1977 – Stepmother of Samanishvili (with Giya Kancheli)
- 1977 – Racha, my love
- 1978 – Data Tutashkhia (with Bidzina Kvernadze)
- 1978 – Kvarkvare
- 1980 – Tbilisi, Paris, Tbilisi
- 1981 – Open the window
- 1984 – The Legend of Suram Fortress
- 1993 – Express - Information (with Vakhtang Kakhidze)
- 1994 – Iavnana

=== Voice ===
- 1974 – Ra-Ni-Na (Animation film)
- 1974 – Watermelon (Animation film)

=== As actor ===
- 1970 – Once Upon a Time There Was a Singing Blackbird – Conductor
- 1996 – Brigands-Chapter VII – Conductor

== Selected recordings ==
- Aram Khachaturian, Gayaneh, complete ballet - USSR Radio and Television Large Symphony Orchestra, conducted by Djansug Kakhidzé, 1976, Russian Disc
- The Moon over Mtatsminda, in Jan Garbarek, Rites, 1998
- Camille Saint-Saëns, Piano Concerto Nº 2 / Fantasies, Liszt / Rhapsodie, Rachmaninov, Elisso Bolkvadze, piano, Tbilisi Symphony Orchestra, conducted by Jansug Kakhidze. Cascavelle, 2010

== Awards ==
- Order of the Badge of Honour (1958)
- Shota Rustaveli Prize (1977)
- People's Artist of the Georgian SSR (1978)
- People's Artist of the USSR (1985)
- Order of the Red Banner of Labour
