= Jansug Charkviani =

Georgian poet and politician

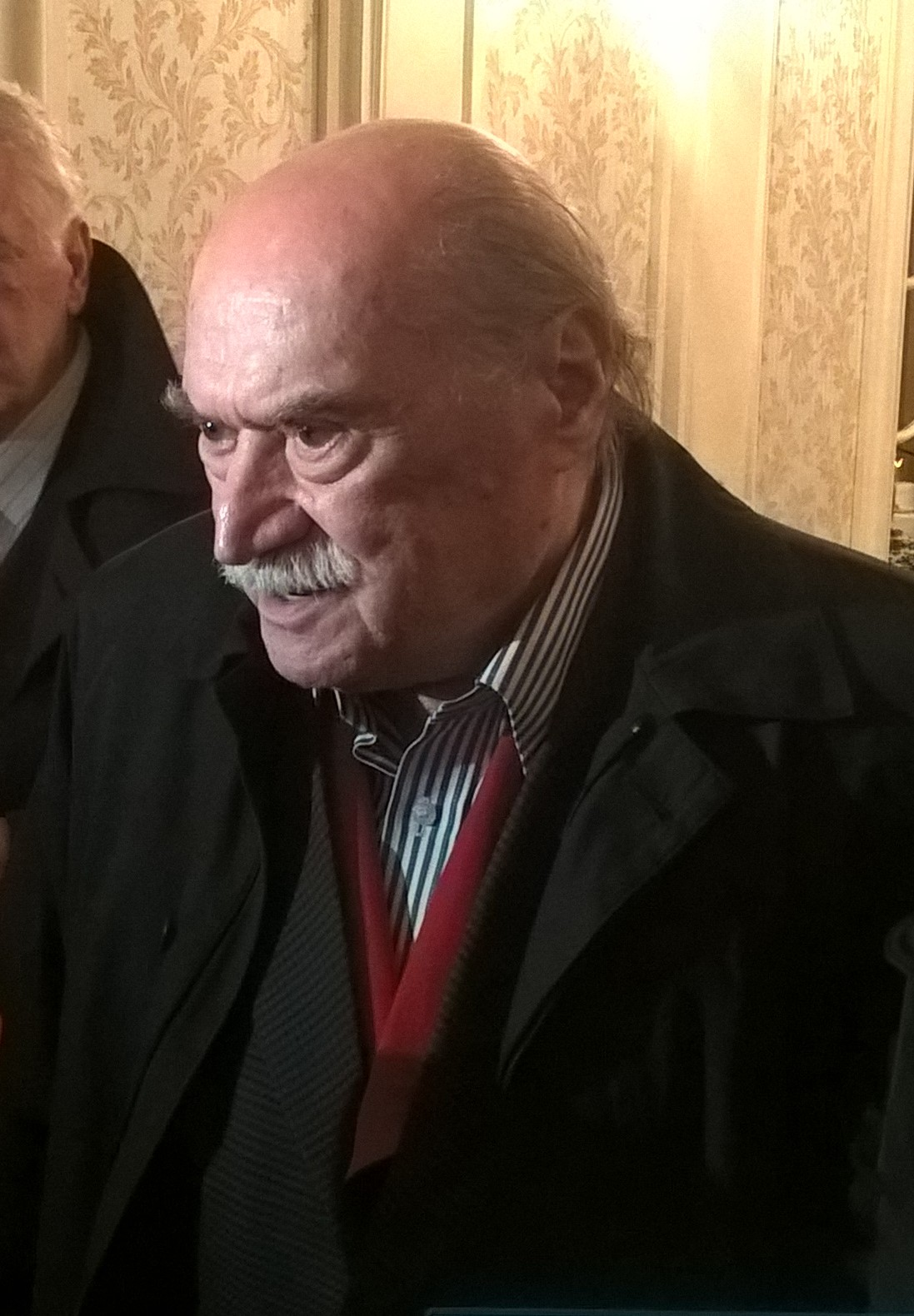
- Born: September 30, 1931; Tbilisi, Georgian SSR
- Died: November 6, 2017 (aged 86); Tbilisi, Georgia
- Occupation: Poet
- Years active: 1947–2017

Jansug Charkviani (Georgian: ჯანსუღ ჩარკვიანი; 30 September 1931 – 6 November 2017) was a Georgian poet. He was a member of the Parliament of Georgia from 1992 to 2004.

Born in Tbilisi, Charkviani graduated from the Tbilisi State University in 1953. He had his first poems published in 1947. From the 1960s to the 1990s he was also an editor of several literary magazines. He was awarded, among other prizes, the Shota Rustaveli Prize (1985), Georgia's Order of Honor, and the title of Honorary Citizen of Tbilisi (1996).
