= Elguja Amashukeli =

Georgian sculptor and painter (1928–2002)

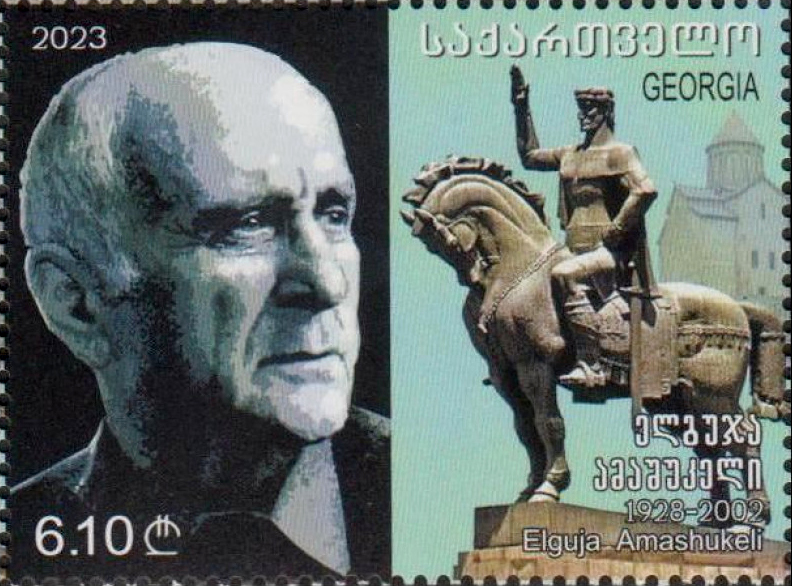
Amashukeli on a 2023 stamp of Georgia

Elguja Amashukeli (Georgian: ელგუჯა დავითის ძე ამაშუკელი; 22 April 1928 – 10 March 2002) was a Georgian sculptor and painter. From 1981 to 1996 he was the chairman of the Georgian Association of Visual Artists.

== Life ==
Elguja Amashukeli graduated from the Tbilisi State Academy of Arts in 1955.

Since 1996 he has been a corresponding member of the Department of Linguistics and Literature of the Georgian Academy of Sciences. In 1985 he became a member of the Soviet Academy of Arts. He designed subway stations, created memorials and monuments in Georgia. Elguja Amashukeli authored the icons with strong national identity in monumental urban sculpture.

He served as secretary of the Union of Artists of the USSR (1984-89), and was a corresponding member of the Russian Academy of Arts (1988). He was awarded the titles of Honored Artist of the USSR (1965), People’s Artist of Georgia (1984-89), as well as the orders of the Red Banner of Labor and the Order of People’s Friendship. He was the laureate of state awards of the USSR and the People’s Republic of Bulgaria.

Elguja Amashukeli died on March 10, 2002, and is buried in the Didube Pantheon Cemetery in Tbilisi.

He wrote two books: The Seventh Sense (1981) and Art Letters (1984).

== Works (selection) ==
- Mother of Georgia, Tbilisi (1958)
- Monument to King Vakhtang I Gorgasali, Tbilisi (1967)
- Monument to Niko Pirosmani, Tbilisi (1975)
- Monument to the heroic sailors, Poti (1979)
- Monument to the Mother Tongue "Knowledge Bell", Tbilisi (1983)
- Monument to King David IV the Builder, Kutaisi (1994)

== Awards ==
- USSR State Prize (1982)
- People's Illustrator of the USSR (1988)
- Shota Rustaveli State Prize (1965)
- Prize of the World Competition in Sofia (1970)
