= Keti Davlianidze =

Georgian painter (born 1976)

Ketevan Davlianidze (Georgian: ქეთევან დავლიანიძის) (born 30 August 1976) is a Georgian painter.

A native of Tbilisi, Davlianidze graduated from the Tbilisi State Academy of Arts in 1999, and has since shown work at numerous exhibits around Georgia. She has ties to Abkhazia, and gained recognition for an exhibit of paintings focusing on the region held at the Georgian Museum of Fine Arts in 2019; the museum holds a number of her works in its permanent collection.
