= Givi Kandareli =

Georgian artist (1933–2006)

- Born: February 21, 1933; Sagarejo, Georgia
- Died: June 7, 2006 (aged 73)
- Known for: Artist

Givi Kandareli (Georgian: გივი ყანდარელი; February 21, 1933 – June 7, 2006) was a famous Georgian painter, one of the premier tapestry and watercolor artists and creator of Georgian school of Gobelin Tapestry.

== Life and work ==
He was born in Sagarejo, Georgia in 1933. He graduated from the Tbilisi State Academy of Arts in 1956 with the degree of ceramics artist, although he completed his master's degree in class of Professor Niko Gomelauri in 1960. Since 1960, he became a teacher of Ceramic Arts in the Academy of Fine Arts in Tbilisi.

In 1965–1966, he went to Prague where he finished his post-graduate studies at the State School of Fine Arts UMPRUM in the class of Professor Antonin Kibal.

Since 1973, he held a concurrent post as a lecturer of watercolor painting at the Department of Architecture of Georgian State Technical University.

In 1975, he became Elected Secretary of Georgian Artist Association of USSR. Same year his work "Weaving Girls" won the annual award of Georgian Artist Association for Best Work.

In 1977, his Four Seasons and Bread won the annual award of Georgian Artist Association for Best Work. That same year, he held solo exhibition in Saarbrücken, Germany.

In 1978, his Weaving Girls won the special award of USSR National Academy of Arts and his work was selected for International Textile Art Triennial Exhibition in Łódź, Poland.

In 1980, he was awarded with title of Honoured Art Worker and held solo exhibition in Tbilisi.

In 1982 his work Dream of Pirosmani was selected for the International Tapestry Bienalle held in Lausanne, Switzerland. Same year he held solo exhibition in Nantes, France.

In 1983, Givi Kandareli was awarded with USSR State Prize For Literature And Arts and held solo exhibitions in Spain.

In 1986 he became Chief of Tapestry Department of Tbilisi Academy of Fine Arts. Next year he acquired the academic title of Professor. 1988 - solo exhibition in Chicago, United States.

In 1990, he was appointed lecturer of Gobelin at the Academy of Arts and Design of Tsinghua University in Beijing, China.

In 1994, Kandareli had a solo exhibition in Palermo, Italy.

Since 1995, he was appointed Professor of the Studio of Dyeing and Weaving Arts and Folk Arts of the National University of Arts and Culture in Tbilisi.

In 1998, he was Elected member of Georgian Academy of Sciences.

In 1999, Kandareli had a solo exhibition in Tbilisi.

In 2000, he became appointed lecturer and invited Professor at the Academy of Arts and Crafts of Shandong Province in China. His works were selected for International Fiberart Bienalle Exhibition (IFBE) From Lausanne to Beijing.

In 2002, he became appointed lecturer and invited Professor at the Heilongjiang University in China, same year his works were selected for IFBE.

In 2003, was held his last lifetime solo exhibition in Tbilisi.

In 2004, his works once more were selected for IFBE.

== Literature ==
- Татьяна Стриженова. Мастера советского искусства. Гиви Кандарели. Гобелен. Изд. "Советский художник". Москва, 1981.
- Zhan Chen. Givi Kandareli. Art collection. "Artron". Beijing, 2004.
