= Robert Sturua =

Georgian theater director (born 1938)

- რობერტ სტურუა
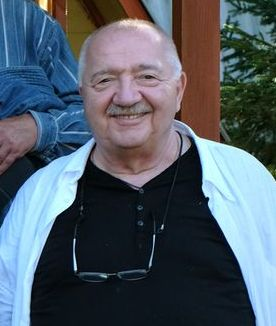
- Sturua in 2015
- Born: Robert Sturua; July 31, 1938 (age 88); Tbilisi, Georgian SSR, Soviet Union
- Occupation: Theater director
- Years active: 1961–present
- Notable work: The Caucasian Chalk Circle (1975); Richard III (1979); King Lear (1990); Hamlet (1986, 2001, 2006)
- Spouse: Dudana Kveselava
- Awards: People's Artist of Georgia; Shota Rustaveli Prize (1981); International acclaim for Shakespeare productions

Robert Sturua (Georgian: რობერტ სტურუა; born 31 July 1938) is a Georgian theater director, who gained international acclaim for his original interpretation of the works of Brecht, Shakespeare, and Chekhov. He was based at the Shota Rustaveli Dramatic Theater in Tbilisi, and has staged productions throughout the world.

== Biography ==
Sturua was born in Tbilisi into an artistic family. His father, Robert, was a notable painter, whose works are part of the permanent exposition at the Tbilisi Art Museum. Mr Sturua is married to Dudana Kveselava, an art historian and an artist in her own right and daughter of Mikhail Kveselava, an accomplished philologist, writer and philosopher, who served as a translator at the Nuremberg trials.

Sturua studied under Mikhail Tumanishvili at the Tbilisi State Theater Institute. Graduating in 1961, he began his career at the Shota Rustaveli Theater, where he became principal director in 1979 and principal artistic director in 1982. His first success came with staging of The Trial of Salem by Arthur Miller in 1965 (original title: The Crucibles). Later, Sturua mounted spectacular, offbeat productions of The Caucasian Chalk Circle by Bertolt Brecht (1975), Richard III (London and Edinburgh, 1979–80) and King Lear (New York, 1990), starring comic actor Ramaz Chkhikvadze. Starting with interpretations of Richard III and King Lear, Sturua became known as paradoxical interpreter of Shakespeare’s theater. Out of 37 Shakespeare plays, Sturua has staged 17; 5 of which at Rustaveli. Hamlet (1986) was staged for the Riverside Studio in London with Alan Rickman as Hamlet, and was hailed as one of ten best Shakespearian productions of the last 50 years by Shakespeare International Association.

In the 1990s, Sturua's productions turned to the inner world. Works included Life is a Dream by Calderón (1992), The Good Person of Szechwan by Brecht (1993), Gospel According to Jacob (1995, based on the Georgian ABC Book by Iakob Gogebashvili), Lamara by Grigol Robakidze (1996). Sturua's dialogue with the audience acquired an even more philosophical tone and focused more on thoughts of eternity, and on the fine line between life and death. The metaphorical language of more recent interpretations is palpably more poetic and includes the fantasy "Styx", inspired by the music of Giya Kancheli (2002); two new versions of Hamlet staged in Tbilisi (2001, 2006); and Waiting for Godot (2002).

== Dismissal ==
In August 2011, Georgia's culture minister Nika Rurua dismissed Robert Sturua as head of the Tbilisi national theatre for "xenophobic" comments he made earlier this year, officials reported. "We are not going to finance xenophobia. Georgia is a multicultural country," Rurua said.

Sturua said in an interview with local news agency of the county’s then-leader, Mikheil Saakashvili, that "Saakashvili doesn't know what Georgian people need because he is Armenian ... I do not want Georgia to be governed by a representative of a different ethnicity", he added.

However, Robert Sturua later declared and explained that he did not mean disrespect to any ethnic group. "I want to speak about racism, of which I was accused. I just said I did not want to have a non-Georgian president. This is not disrespectful towards Armenians. If Armenians say they want a non-Armenian president, or Russians say they dream about a Georgian one, I will apologize." he said.

== Links ==
- The official biography of Robert Sturua. Shota Rustaveli State Drama Theatre. Retrieved on April 13, 2007.
- Banham, Martin (ed., 1995), The Cambridge Guide to Theatre, page 1041. Cambridge University Press, ISBN 0-521-43437-8.
- Mikaberidze, Alexander (ed., 2007), Sturua, Robert. The Dictionary of Georgian National Biography. Retrieved on April 13, 2007.
