= Natela Iankoshvili =

Georgian painter (1918–2008)

Natela Iankoshvili (sometimes Ianqoshvili) (Georgian: ნათელა იანქოშვილი) (28 August 1918 – 12 October 2008) was a Georgian painter.

== Biography ==
A native of Gurjaani, Iankoshvili studied from 1937 until 1943 at the Tbilisi State Academy of Art. She later became a member of the Union of Artists. Her instructors included Lado Gudiashvili, Davit Kakabadze, and Sergo Kolubadze. She was active as a graphic artist and illustrator as well; her illustrations were used for a Japanese edition of The Knight in the Panther's Skin published in 1966. Iankoshvili was married to the writer Lado Avaliani, with whom she lived in a small, cramped apartment in Tbilisi. So little space did they have that she was required to work during the day, leaving him space to write at night. The couple had no children. The artist continued to live in the apartment after Avaliani's death. She died on 12 October 2008 and was buried at the Didube Pantheon next to her husband.

Iankoshvili refused to conform to the expected social realist style of the Soviets, favoring instead a neo-expressionist manner of painting which was to become her hallmark. Even so, she was able to travel, visiting Cuba and Mexico during the course of her career. The works produced during these sojourns were later displayed in Tbilisi. At 42, she had a solo exhibition at the Tbilisi Art Gallery, becoming the first woman artist so honored.

Iankoshvili was the subject of a retrospective exhibition at the Zurab Tsereteli Museum of Modern Art in 2018; it marked the first time in 45 years her work was given a solo show in the country of her birth. In 2000 a museum dedicated to her work, containing over one thousand pieces, was opened in the Georgian capital; formerly operated by the government, it is currently private. She is the subject of a monograph edited by Mamuka Bliadze, to published by the University of Chicago Press in July 2020. Her work may be found in the collection of the Georgian Museum of Fine Arts.
