= Besik Kharanauli =

Georgian poet and writer (born 1939)

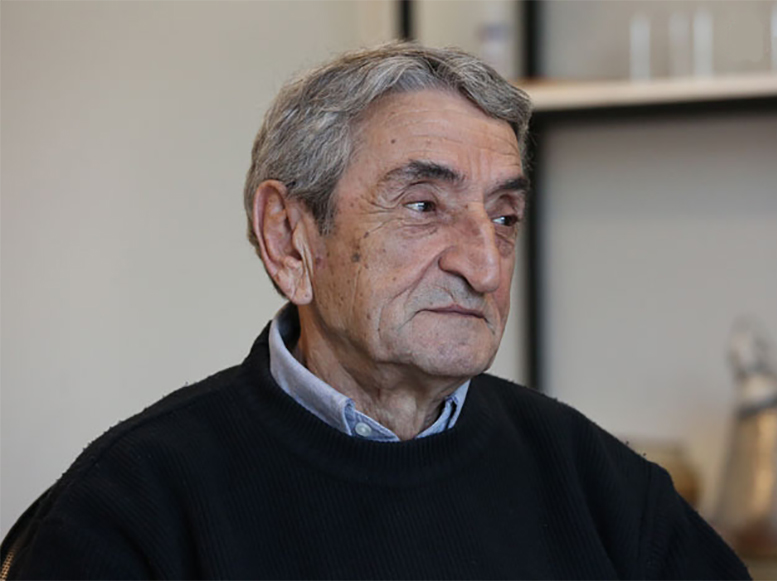
- Kharanauli in 2018
- Born: Besik Kharanauli; 11 November 1939 (age 86); Tianeti, Georgia
- Occupations: Poet, writer
- Children: Levan, Mariam, Alexander
- Writing career
- Genre: Poetry
- Notable work: Poems 1954 – 2005, 2012
- Literary movement: Metamodernism
- Website: armuri.georgianforum.com/t55-topic

Besik Kharanauli (IPA: [besikʼ χaɾanauli]; Georgian: ბესიკ ხარანაული; born 11 November 1939, in Tianeti) is a Georgian poet and writer.

== Biography ==
Besik Kharanauli Born in 1939, Tianeti, Georgia. In 1962 he graduated Ivane Javakhishvili Tbilisi University, the Department of Philology. After he worked the Literature and Art publishing hose and in the literary magazine Mnatobi.

Besik Kharanauli started his literary career in 1954. He is the author of more than twenty poetic collections and two novels.

Poetry by Besik Kharanauli is translated in German, Dutch, Italian, Czech, Hungarian, Russian, Bulgarian. In 2010 his long poem The book of Amba Besarion was published in France. In 2018 Poetry Collection by Besik Kharanauli 'Sprich mir vor, Angelina! Fünf Poeme' was translated and published by German Publishing House Dağyeli Verlag with support of the Georgian National Book Center, translated into German by Nana Chigladze and Norbert Hummelt. A second title 'Das Buch des Amba Besarion' (The Book of Amba Besarion) was translated in German by Julia Dengg and published 2021 by Dağyeli Verlag.

In 2011 and 2015 Besik Kharanauli was nominated for the Nobel prize for literature by the Georgian government. In 2015 he won literary prize SABA for the Contribution to the Development of Georgian Literature.

=== Books ===
- Translations from American, Intelekti Publishing, 2014, ISBN 978-9941-454-33-2
- Poems 2003 – 2013, Intelekti Publishing, 2013, ISBN 978-9941-440-09-0
- The Chief Gamer, Intelekti Publishing, 2012, ISBN 978-9941-440-97-7
- Poems 1954 – 2005, Intelekti, 2012
- Epigraphs for Forgotten Dreams, Sulakauri, 2005; Palitra L, 2010
- Sixty Knights Riding Mules, Sezane, 2010, ISBN 978-9941-0-2189-3
- 100 Poems, Intelekti, 2007, ISBN 978-99940-931-5-1
- Two Pages about the Sky and Earth, 2005
- Amba Besarion's Book, Arete, 2003, ISBN 99940-745-0-4
- An Afternoon Book, Nakaduli, 1991, ISBN 5-525-00283-3
- Verses, Poems, Merani, 1988
- Dictate, Angelina!, Merani, 1985
- Agonic, Merani, 1991
- The Lame Doll, Merani, 1973

== Prizes and awards ==
- Literary award Saba, 2016
- Literary Prize Litera, 2016
- Honorary award Saba, 2015 for his Contribution to the Georgian Literature
- Literary Prize GALA, 2012
- President's Order of Eminence, 2010
- Literary Award Saba, 2004
- Shota Rustaveli State Prize, 2002
- The State Prize of Georgia, 1992 for his Contribution to the Georgian Literature
