= Shah Nazar-e Mirian =

Shah Nazar-e Mirian شاه نظر ميريان
- Village
- Location within Iran
- Coordinates: 33°34′22″N 47°41′24″E
- Country: Iran
- Province: Lorestan
- County: Kuhdasht
- Bakhsh: Central
- Rural District: Kuhdasht-e Jonubi

Population (2006)
  - Total: 173
- Time zone: UTC+3:30 (IRST)
  - Summer (DST): UTC+4:30 (IRDT)

Shah Nazar-e Mirian (Persian: شاه نظر ميريان, also Romanized as Shāh Naẓar-e Mīrīān; also known as Shāhnaẓar-e Mīrīān) is a village in Kuhdasht-e Jonubi Rural District, in the Central District of Kuhdasht County, Lorestan Province, Iran. At the 2006 census, its population was 173, in 32 families.
