= Alexandre Bandzeladze =

Georgian artist

Alexandre Bandzeladze (Georgian: ალექსანდრე ბანძელაძე; 27 February 1927 – 13 June 1992) was a Georgian and Soviet modern artist who was notable as a painter, illustrator, and graphic artist. He was made an Honored Artist of Georgia (1965) and awarded the State Prize of Georgia (1993).

Alexander Bandzeladze was born in Tulun, Siberia, to a Georgian father and Estonian mother. His family, after having been exiled to the Irkutsk District during the repressions in the 1920s, returned to Tbilisi in 1932. In 1947, he enrolled in the Oil Painting Department of the Tbilisi State Academy of Arts under the tutorship of Sergo Kobuladze, Iosif Charlemagne, and Valentin Sherpilov. Expelled from the academy in 1949, he received his diploma as late as 1963, with the help of Apolon Kutateladze. At that time, Bandzeladze actively collaborated with the editorial teams of various Georgian magazines. He authored milestone works for the development of Georgian book graphic design, such as Arsenas Leksi (Arsena's Poem) (1957) and Rudyard Kipling's Mowgli (1960). In 1978–1988, he painted the murals at the Church of the Dormition of the Mother of God in Didube.

In the 1950s, Alexandre Bandzeladze led an innovative movement in Georgia and the Soviet Union in general and pioneered the process of rejuvenating the language of visual arts. During his creative quest, and as a result of taking in the traditions of modernist European oil painting, he developed his own artistic system characterized by striking individualism. After Davit Kakabadze, Bandzeladze was one of the first to have returned abstract art into Georgia's artistic context.

His work was unknown in the West until 1987 because of repressive Soviet attitudes on non-standard expression in the arts.

Alexandre Bandzeladze's works have had an enormous impact on the development of contemporary Georgian visual arts and on nourishing interest in arts among younger generations.

Bandzeladze’s artworks are held in many public collections, including the Zimmerli Art Museum in New Brunswick, NJ.

== Exhibitions ==
Solo exhibitions

- 1991 "Dissident“, Sevikli, Pennsylvania, USA
- 1991 Georgian Abstractions, Nicholas Rerikh Museum, New York - New York, USA
- 1990 "Where am I...?", Amsterdam, Netherlands
- 1989 Sevikli, Pennsylvania, USA
- 1988 Basel, Brussels, Belgium
- 1968 Opava, Czech Republic

Group Exhibitions

- 2000 - N Gallery, Tbilisi, Georgia
- 1992 - Mapini Art - Gallery, Sheffield, England
- 1991 - "Georgian Abstraction", "international image" Gallery, Pittsburgh, USA
- 1990 - "In the expression of watercolor," Tbilisi, Georgia
- 1990 - Four Design from Tbilisi, prideritsianis Museum, Kassel exhibition of abstract art. Cinema House, Moscow, Russia
- 1990 - "Georgia, My Love," Dumas kunst hale, Cologne, Germany
- 1990 - Georgian Art 1990, Mona Bismarck Foundation for International Art Exhibition House, Paris, France
- 1989 - "International image" Gallery, Pittsburgh, USA
- 1989 - Oriental Wave "Red - White," the Association "palette." Warsaw, Poland
- 1989 - 1920–1980 - ies of the Soviet Association palitra "Paris, beloruseti
- 1989 - Budenshati Gallery, Basel, Switzerland
- 1989 - 1970–1980 years of the Soviet Russian avant-garde, the association "palette" Moscow, Russia
- 1988 - Exhibition of Soviet Artists Gallery bosmanis, Brussels, Belgium
- 1987 - Hermitage Exhibition Hall, St. Petersburg, Russia
- 1987 - House of Artists. Tbilisi, Georgia
- 1986 - House of Artists, Tbilisi, Georgia
- 1972 - Museum of Fine Arts, Tbilisi
- 1966 - International Graphic Art Biennale, Brno, Czech Republic
- 1959 - Brussels, Belgium
- 1959 - Riga, Latvia, Lithuania
- 1957 - Museum of Fine Arts, Tbilisi, Georgia
- 1957 - Manege, Moscow, Russia
- 1954 - Art Museum of Azerbaijan, Baku, Azerbaijan
- 1953 - Museum of Fine Arts, Tbilisi, Georgia
- 1949 - National Gallery of images, Tbilisi, Georgia
- 1949 - National Gallery of images, Tbilisi, Georgia

Details taken from the Georgian Art Portal.
