= Keti, Armenia =

Keti Քեթի
- Location within Armenia Location within Shirak
- Coordinates: 40°53′03″N 43°50′56″E
- Country: Armenia
- Province: Shirak
- Municipality: Akhuryan

Population (2011)
  - Total: 993
- Time zone: UTC+4
  - Summer (DST): UTC+5

Keti (Armenian: Քեթի) is a village in the Shirak Province of Armenia.

== Demographics ==
Historical population
Year	Pop.	±% p.a.
1831	258	—
1897	913	+1.93%
1926	528	−1.87%
1939	921	+4.37%
1959	872	−0.27%
1970	865	−0.07%
1979	807	−0.77%
1989	895	+1.04%
2001	1,105	+1.77%
2011	993	−1.06%
