= Tbilisi Art Gallery =

Gallery in Tbilisi, Georgia

- თბილისის სამხატვრო გალერეა
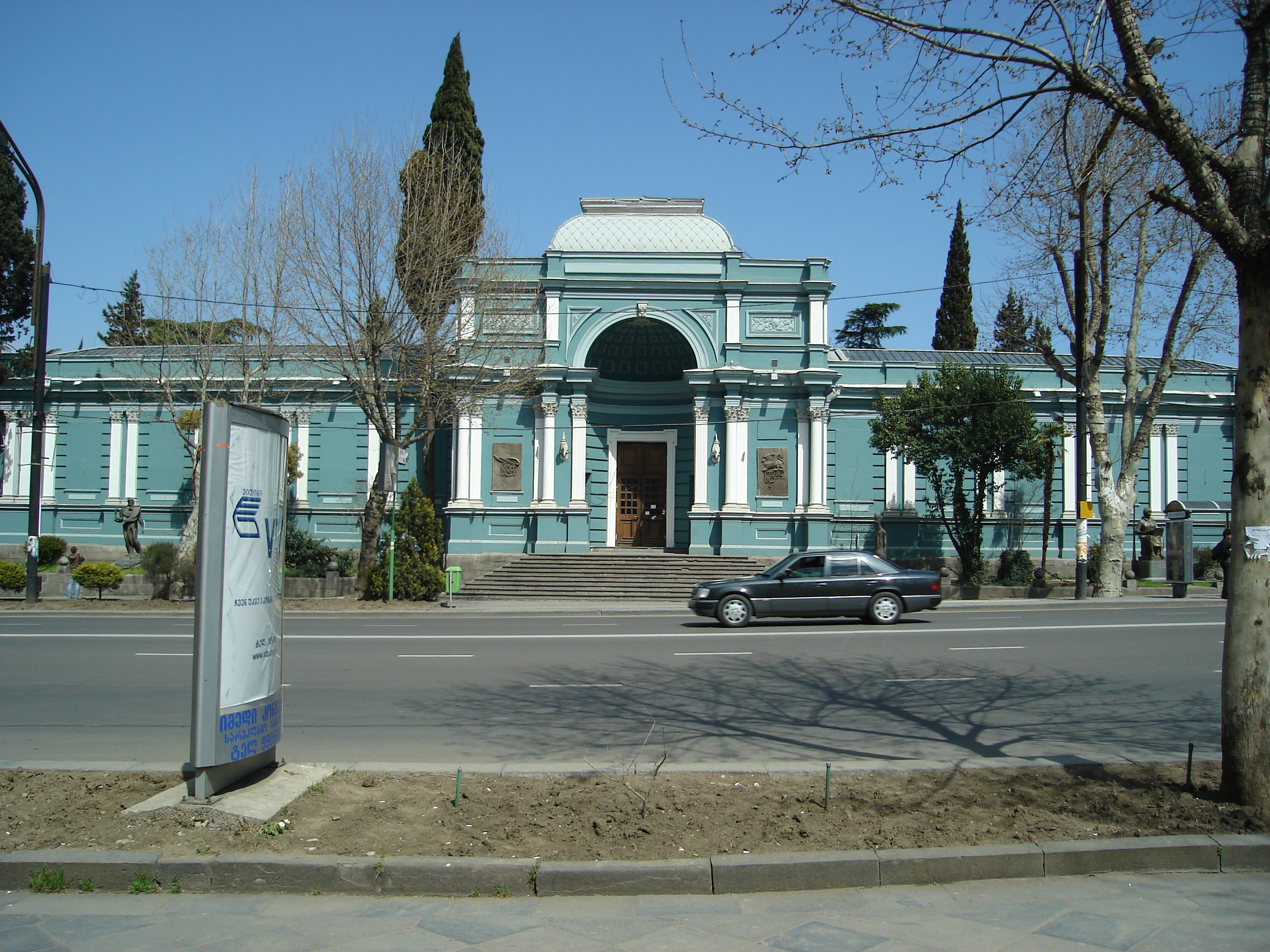
- Location: Georgia
- Coordinates: 41°41′54″N 44°47′56″E
- Location of Tbilisi Art Gallery

Tbilisi Art Gallery as it appears today

The Tbilisi Art Gallery (Georgian: თბილისის სამხატვრო გალერეა), or the National Gallery is an art gallery located on Rustaveli Avenue in Tbilisi. Historically, it is known to Tbilisians as the Blue Gallery, taking its name from the various shades of the blue-green paint previously adorning the facade, although the building is now painted grey.

== History ==
The history of the National Art Gallery dates back the late 19th century. Its foundation is associated with the famous public figure and Georgian artist Dimitri Shevardnadze.

The building in which it is located was built in 1888 by the decision of the Russian emperor and the Russian Military Historical Museum. The hall of fame was also founded.

The first exhibition of the Art Gallery was held in October 1920. The gallery's exhibition policy was revealed in the early years: exhibitions of Georgian and foreign artists, old and new art periods and what has been valued or entered in the territory of Georgia.

== Architecture ==
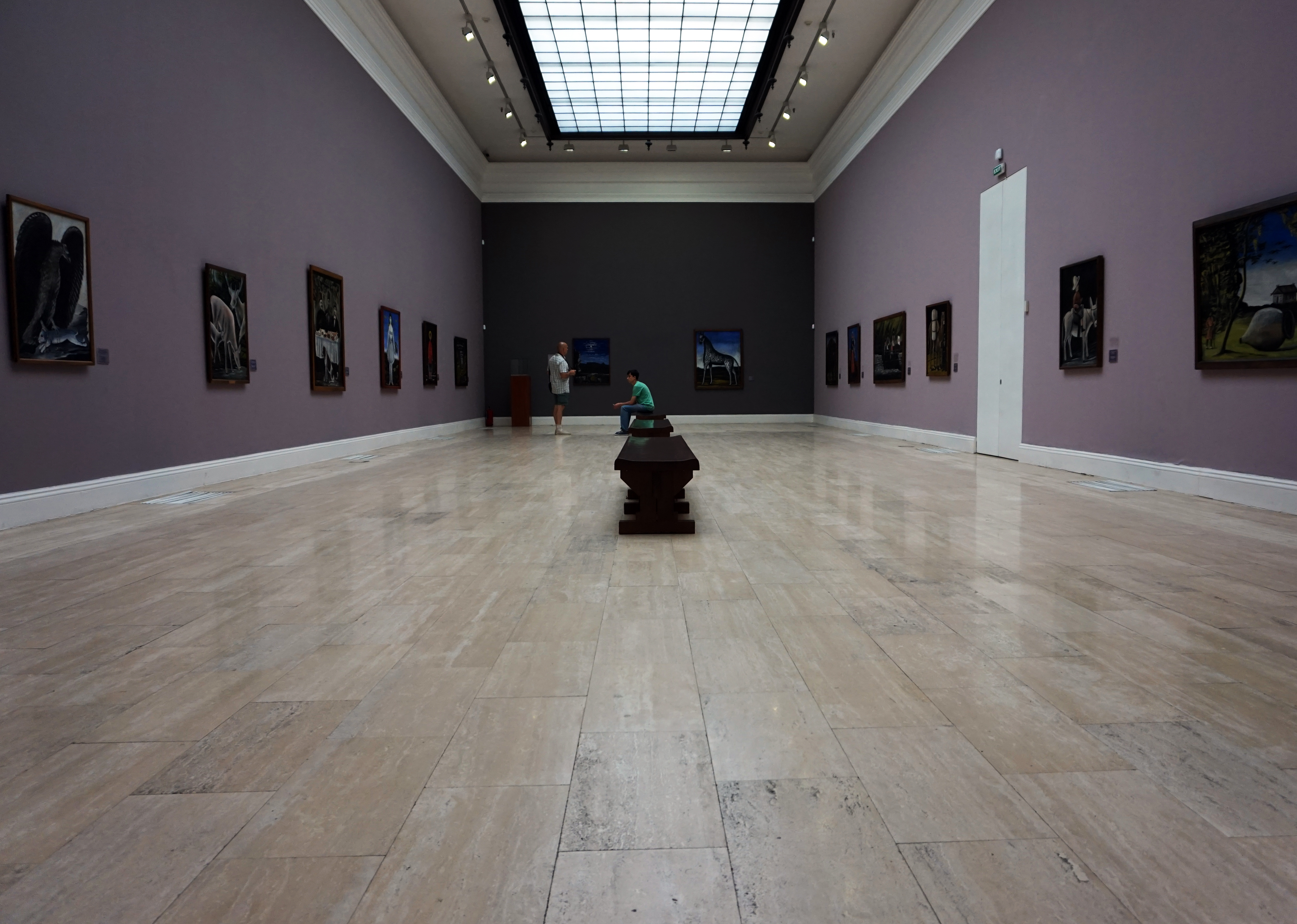
Exhibition space

The Gallery between 1880 - 1883 was built for the exhibition of the mibadzvitaa house. The facade of Rustaveli Avenue has a richly decorated decoration and features Baroque art. In the center of the building is the entrance. The two rooms of gallery have a glass ceiling and therefore are illuminated with sunlight.

== Present ==
In 2007, the Tbilisi Art Gallery joined the National Museum of Georgia. A large-scale reconstruction of the gallery building was planned, which resulted in improvements to the central facade and exhibition space.

The building has also grown at the expense of gardening. The new exhibition space was created as a result of the reconstruction. The renovated gallery consists of eight rooms, a restoration laboratory, the necessary storage to organize temporary exhibitions, a training space, and an open shop.

On November 7, 2006, according to the Decree of the President of Georgia, obtained the category of Monuments of National Importance of Georgia.
