= Givi Toidze =

Georgian artist and painter (1932–2022)

- Born: Grigorij Vahtangovič Toidze; 18 December 1932; Tbilisi, Georgian SSR, Transcaucasian SFSR
- Died: 10 February 2022 (aged 89); Tbilisi, Georgia
- Education: Tbilisi State Academy of Arts
- Known for: Painting
- Notable work: Winter, Fishermen, Old Tbilisi, Narikala

Givi Toidze (Georgian: გივი თოიძე, 18 December 1932 – 10 February 2022) was a Georgian artist and painter, Honored Artist of the Georgian SSR (1967), People's Artist of the Georgian SSR (1988), Honorary Citizen of Tbilisi (1999), and Secretary of the Artists' Union of Georgia.

== Life and career ==
In 1960, Givi graduated from the Tbilisi State Academy of Arts and then was a professor at the same academy for many years.

He participated in exhibitions since 1961. Notable among his works are "Winter", "Fishermen", "Khevsureti", "Mtatusheti", "Old Tbilisi" and "Narikala". His works are preserved in museums such as Tretyakov Gallery (Russia), Museum of the Peoples of the East (Russia), and Peter Ludwig Gallery (Germany). His paintings have been collected by George W. Bush, Jacques Chirac, and other notables.

Toidze died on 10 February 2022, at the age of 89.

== Awards ==
- 1981 — Shota Rustaveli Prize
- 1967 — Honored Artist of the Georgian SSR
