= Keti Chkhikvadze =

Georgian fashion designer

Ketevan "Keti" Chkhikvadze (Georgian: ქეთი ჩხიკვაძე) is a Georgian fashion designer.

Keti is also a well-known fashion designer in Kazakhstan.

Keti's brand is presented in Tbilisi, Paris, UAE, Italy, Kyiv, Moscow, Saint Petersburg and Kazakhstan.
