= Nana Janelidze =

Georgian film director and screenwriter (born 1955)

- ნანა ჯანელიძე
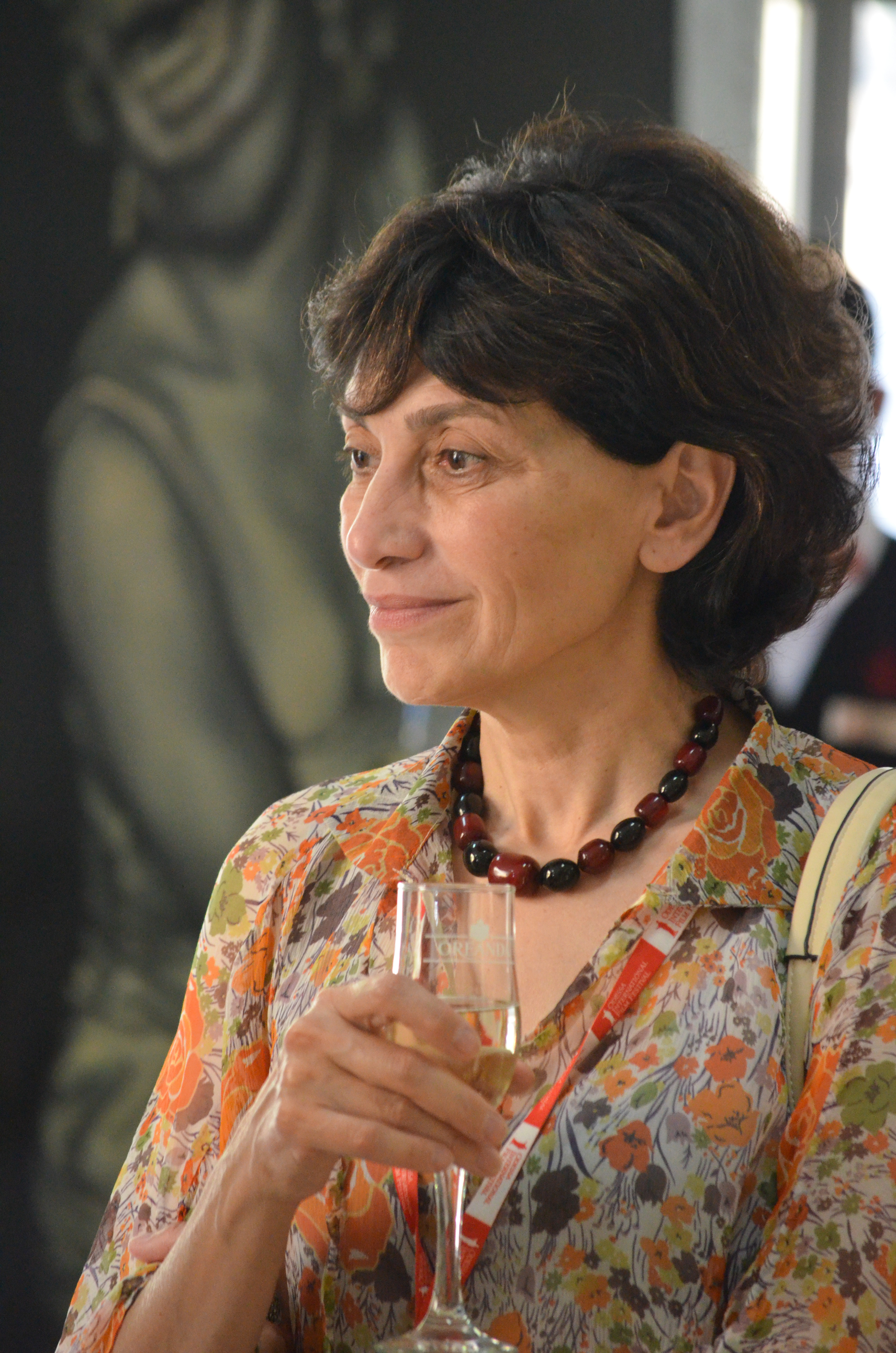
- Janelidze at the Odesa International Film Festival, 2014
- Born: 7 August 1955 (age 70); Tbilisi, Georgian Soviet Socialist Republic
- Occupations: Film director, screenwriter
- Years active: 1978–present

Nana Janelidze (Georgian: ნანა ჯანელიძე, born 7 August 1955) is a Georgian film director and screenwriter.

== Biography ==
Janelidze was born on 7 August 1955 in Tbilisi. She studied at Shota Rustaveli Theatre and Film University under Tengiz Abuladze, graduating in 1981.

Janelidze worked with Tengiz Abuladze on the 1984 film Repentance as screenwriter and music designer. The film won the Grand Prix at the 1987 Cannes Film Festival, was nominated for a Golden Globe Award for Best Foreign Language Film, and won the Nika Award in six categories, including Best Screenplay.

In 1994 she wrote and directed the film Iavnana, which won her the State Prize of Georgia and Jakob Gogebashvili pedagogical prize.

In 2000 Janelidze and actress Nanuka Khuskivadze founded the film production studio N&N. In 2008-2009 Janelidze managed a project in which N&N studios collaborated with the Association for Film Heritage Protection to restore the 1912 film Journey of Akaki Tsereteili to Racha-Lechkhumi, Georgia's first documentary film.

In 2011 Janelidze directed and co-wrote the film Will There Be a Theatre Up There?!, starring Kakhi Kavsadze, based on the true life story of the Kavsadze family. The film won a Nika Award for Best Film of the CIS and Baltic States.

In 2012 she began presenting a cinema program on Folk-Radio. From 2013 to 2016 she was the director of the Georgian National Film Centre.

In 2019 a teaser was released of a biographical film on the life of Ukrainian poet Lesya Ukrainka, directed by Janelidze, in a co-production between Georgia and Ukraine.

== Filmography ==
Year	English name	Original title	Director	Screenwriter	Notes	Ref.
1978	Big Boy and Little Boy	Didi bichi da patara bichi	Yes	Yes	short film	
1984	Repentance	Monanieba	No	Yes (Note: Co-writer with Tengiz Abuladze and Rezo Kveselava.)	also music designer	
1985	Family	Ojakhi	Yes	Yes	short TV film	
1988	Holiday	Dghesastsauli	No	No	as an actor	
1994	Lullaby	Iavnana	Yes	Yes		
2002	Tengiz Abuladze	Tengiz Abuladze	Yes	Yes	documentary	
2003	Dreams of the Dry Bridge	Mshrali khidis sizmrebi	Yes	Yes	also producer	
2005	Christmas Present	Sashobao sachukari	Yes	Yes	short film	
2010	Knights of Georgian Chant	Galobis Raindebi	Yes	No	docudrama	
2011	Will There Be a Theatre Up There?!	Netavi ik Teatri aris?!	Yes	Yes	also producer	

== Bibliography ==
- Tengiz Abuladze – Reflections
- Rezo Chkheidze – On the High Road of Film
