= Levan Tsutskiridze =

Georgian painter (1926–2021)

Levan Tsutskiridze (Georgian: ლევან ცუცქირიძე; 12 January 1926 – 17 November 2021) was a Georgian monumentalist artist, illustrator, and painter of frescoes in the Sioni Cathedral, Tbilisi.

Tsutskiridze illustrated The Knight in the Tiger’s Skin, a poem published in Berlin in German translation. It was also published in Tbilisi, Moscow, Yerevan, and Japan. He was also the author of the design and illustrations of more than thirty books.

== Early life ==
Levan Tsutskiridze was born in the small town of Khashuri in what was then the Georgian Soviet Socialist Republic. Most of his childhood was spent in a small village, Moliti, in the Imereti region. When Tsutskiridze was 11, his father was killed in 1937 by the Soviet Government during the Great Purge. After his death, the family faced eviction from their home and poverty.

Tsutskiridze received primary education at a Tbilisi public school. In 1946, he started taking classes on painting and graphic arts at Tbilisi State Academy of Arts. During his time at the academy, the staff labeled Tsutskiridze as having a formalist style and punished him for allegedly being obstinate and disobedient. They demoted him first from second year to first year and then again from fourth year to first year. As a result, Tsutskiridze did not graduate the academy until 1957. After graduation, his works were banned from the exhibition list.

In 1958, Tsutskiridze participated in the republican exhibition with the painting ‘’Toast’’. The exhibition lasted the whole month, but his picture hung at the Blue Gallery for three days. His illustrations of The Knight in the Tiger’s Skin and painting ‘’Dance’’ suffered the same fate. In the end recognition finally happened, but with difficulty.

Tsutskiridze held his first personal exhibition in 1959 in Tbilisi, at the Union of Architects of Georgia. The exhibition proved his artistic manner to originate from the Georgian traditional fresco, at the same time bearing individual features.

During 1960 and 1970, Tsutskiridze was a professor of Tbilisi Academy of Arts and Polytechnic Institute of Georgia (by turns), while during 1971 and 2005, a professor of Chair of Drawing of Tbilisi Academy of Arts. In 1976, a large canvas called “Aspiration” was installed in Poti. In 1977, a monumental picture “Kolkheti”- in the town of Senaki and “Cherishable” based on The Knight in the Tiger’s Skin by Shota Rustaveli at the House of Union of Writers of Georgia.

In 1984-88, Tsutskiridze completed frescoes paintings on three walls of the Sioni Cathedral. Artist’s uncanny ability to portray the vast spiritual world beyond physical matter led theCatholicos-Patriarch of Georgia, Ilia II, to commission Levan Tsutskiridze to paint the murals at Sioni Cathedral.

In 1997, "Data Tutashkhia" by Chabua Amirejibi, with illustrations by Tsutskiridze, was published. Tsutskiridze also illustrated the seven volume edition of Chabua Amirejibi works published by Magticom in 2001.

== Exhibitions ==
- 1958 republic exhibition. Tbilisi. Georgia.
- 1959 personal exhibition. The Union of Architects of Georgia. Tbilisi. Georgia
- 1961 personal exhibition. House of Art Workers. Tbilisi. Georgia
- 1968 personal exhibition. House of the Society for International Cultural Relations, Berlin, Germany
- 1972 exhibition dedicated to the 50th anniversary of the USSR. Moscow, Georgia
- 1973 personal exhibition. Publishing House of “Merani”, Tbilisi, Georgia
- 1974 group exhibition of Georgian artists (Levan Tsutskiridze, Zurab Nizharadze, Dinara Nodia, Irakli Ochiauri), Belgium
- 1975 group exhibition of Georgian artists (Levan Tsutskiridze, Zurab Nizharadze, Dinara Nodia, Irakli Ochiauri), Austria
- 1976 group exhibition of Georgian artists (Levan Tsutskiridze, Zurab Nizharadze, Dinara Nodia, Irakli Ochiauri), Federal Republic of Germany
- 1977 personal exhibition. National State of Museum of Art, Tbilisi, Georgia
- 1977 personal exhibition. House of Scientists, Moscow, Russia
- 1977 personal exhibition. House of Literature Workers, Moscow, Russia
- 1979 personal exhibition. State Picture Gallery, Batumi Georgia
- 1981 exhibition dedicated to the days of Johann Wolfgang Goethe, Weimar, Germany
- 1982 personal exhibition. Illustrations, G. Leonidze State Museum of Literature, Tbilisi, Georgia
- 1982 personal exhibition. House of the Soviet Culture, Belgrade, Yugoslavia
- 2004 personal exhibition. G. Leonidze State Museum of Literature, Tbilisi, Georgia
- 2007 personal exhibition. National Library of the Parliament of Georgia, Tbilisi, Georgia
- 2014 personal exhibition. G. Leonidze State Museum of Literature, Tbilisi, Georgia
- 2020 personal exhibition. Georgian Museum of Fine Arts, Tbilisi, Georgia

== Awards ==
- In 1974, in Brazil, he won the Hans Christian Andersen Award for the design and illustration of poem “Toast’’ by Grigol Orbeliani, issued by the international Board on Books for young people.
- During the Soviet Union period, he was granted the highest “first A” category.
- Magazine Soviet Life was being published in USA starting from the 70s. In 1983, the December release published Amiran Chkartishvil's article about Levan Tsutskiridze, entitled ‘’A stark, muted palette’’.
- In 2001, he was granted the title of Georgian State Prize Winner.
- In 2002, he was invited to Italy as prize winner of Bogliasco International Foundation for his works of the past years.
- Five of the artist's works participated in festival "Iberia", which was held in 2010 in Netherlands.
