= Elene Akhvlediani =

20th-century Georgian painter, graphic artist, and theater decorator (1901–1975)

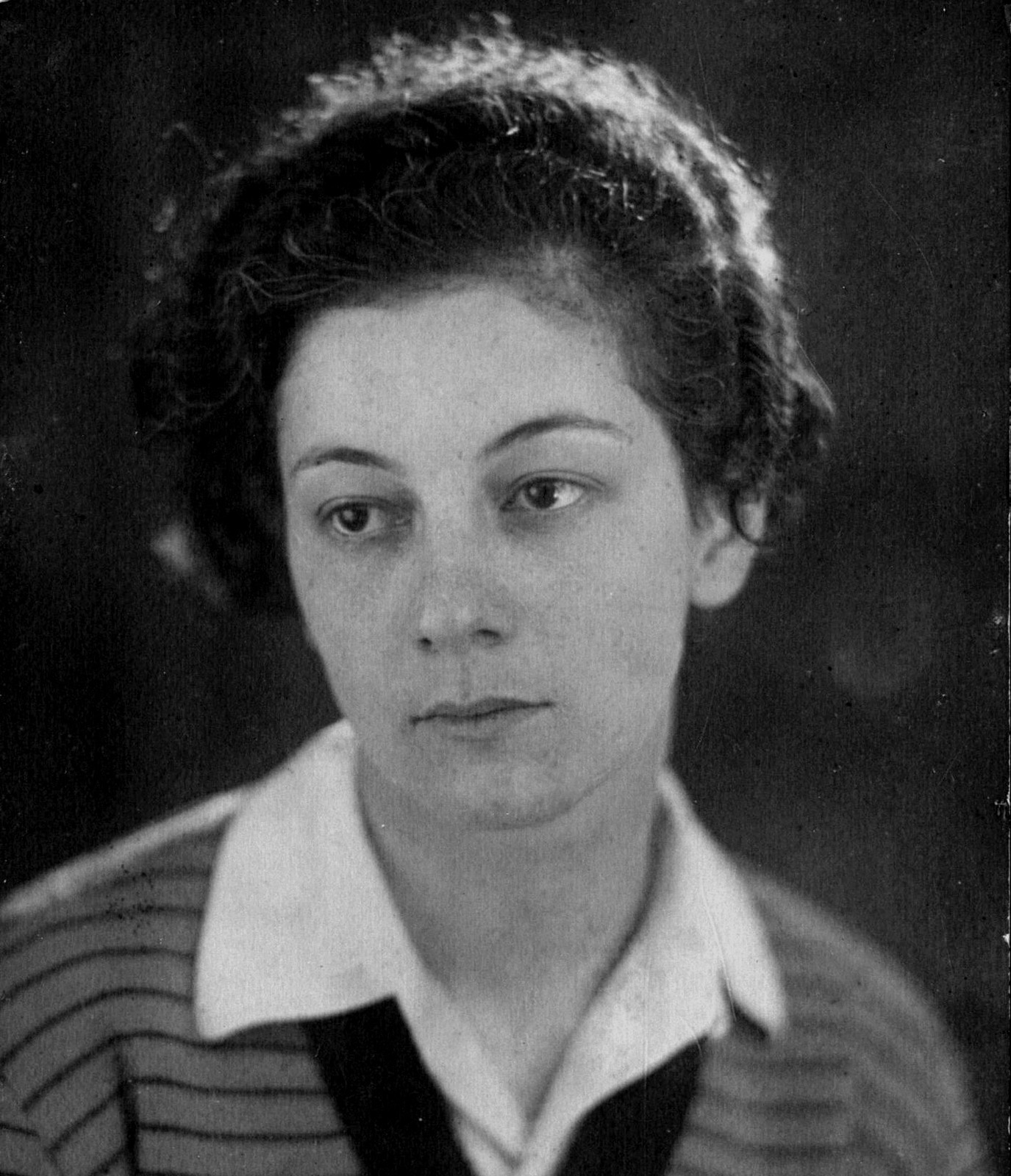
- Akhvlediani in 1926
- Born: April 5, 1898; Telavi, Russian Empire
- Died: December 30, 1975 (aged 77); Tbilisi, Georgian SSR, Soviet Union
- Resting place: Didube Pantheon, Tbilisi
- Known for: Painting
- Awards: Shota Rustaveli Prize (1971)

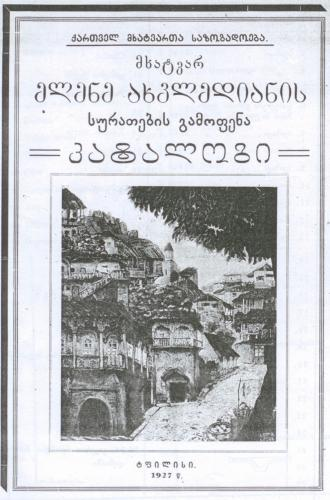
Catalog of Elene Akhvledianis paintings, 1927

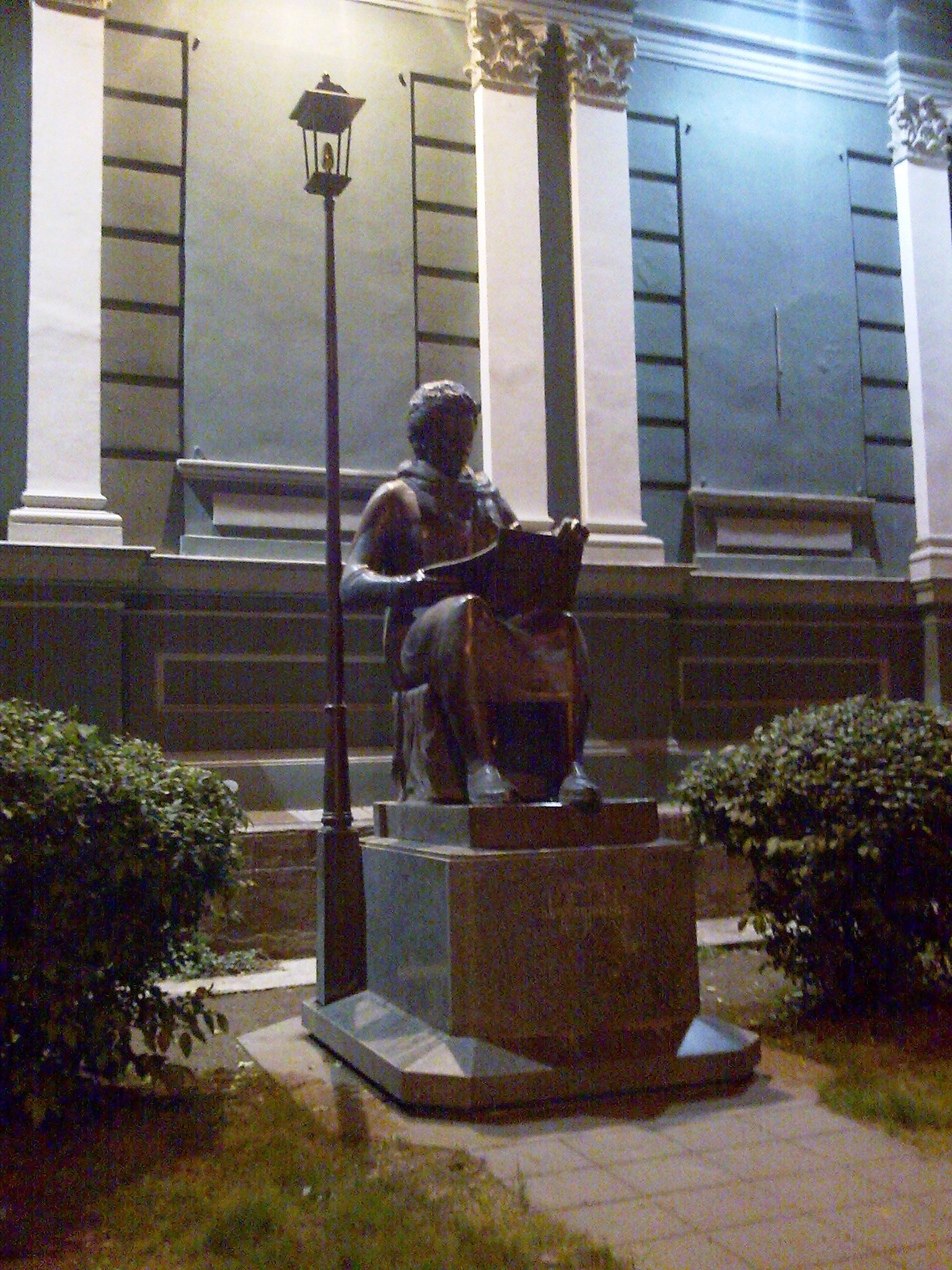
Elene Akhvlediani Statue, Tbilisi

Elene Akhvlediani (Georgian: ელენე ახვლედიანი; April 5, 1898 in Telavi – December 30, 1975 in Tbilisi) was a 20th-century Georgian painter, graphic artist, and theater decorator. Akhvlediani is famous for her depictions of Georgian towns, for her illustrations for the works of Ilia Chavchavadze and Vazha-Pshavela, and for designing plays in the Marjanishvili Theater in Tbilisi, Georgia.

== Biography ==
She received her education at the Tbilisi N. Skliphosofsky Art Studio. She traveled to Moscow and got impressed by Vrubel's paintings. In 1919, she participated in Georgian artists exhibition. In 1921, continues studies at Tbilisi Art Academy in G. Gabashvili class. In 1922, she left for Italy for further studies and traveled to Rome, Milan, Florence and Venice for 6 months. In 1924, Akhvlediani began studying at Académie Colarossi in Paris, where her main field of work – urban landscapes – elaborated. By this time she made the whole series of Parisian views. It is also in Paris that a big graphic series of her up till now less known Nude is created. Obviously, she never returned to it back in Soviet Georgia .

Like her avant-garde colleague Lado Gudiashvili, Akhvlediani faced persecution under Stalin but was widely celebrated by the 1970s. Her landscapes of Old Tbilisi, in particular, were embraced during the late Soviet period's revival of interest in urban folk culture. Akhvlediani appears as herself (alongside Lado Gudiashvili) in Temur Palavandishvili's 1973 film Mze Shemodgomisa (Autumn Sun), in which a stifled artist moves to Ortachala from his sterile postwar flat and finds inspiration in the city's historic architecture. To this day, many painters of Old Tbilisi buildings wittingly or unwittingly emulate Akhvlediani's style.
