= Alexander Firsovich Sukhanov =

Russian painter (1924–1995)

Alexander Sukhanov
- Born: Alexander Firsovich Sukhanov; 7 February 1924; Gornee, Smolensk Oblast, Russia
- Died: 3 April 1995 (aged 71); Moscow, Russia
- Education: Moscow Art Institute of Surikov in Moscow
- Known for: Fine art
- Spouse(s): Lavinia Bazhbeuk-Melikyan, painter
- Children: Mariam Sukhanova, painter

Alexander Firsovich Sukhanov (Russian: [alʲeksánʲdr fʲɛrsovʲtɕ suxanov]; 7 February 1924 – 3 April 1995) was a Soviet-Russian painter who lived and worked in Moscow. He was known as a painter who employed sensuous expressions of nature in his painterly style artworks giving visual expression to the atmosphere of a particular place and time.

== Early life ==
Sukhanov was born in Gornee village, Smolensk Oblast, Russia. The third of five children in a peasant family, he was the only son. Peasant life demanded that the older members of the family work in the fields from sunrise till dusk. Staying behind, Alexander helped with the cooking and from the age of six could bake pancakes for the whole family. The years after the Russian Revolution and civil war were hard and required adjustment to Bolshevik rule. War communism and terror greatly affected the peasantry. Grain requisitions by the state feeling pressure to feed the towns which left little for rural families to feed themselves and nothing to spare for planting the next season. Matters got worse when the government suspended the market for grain as well as attacks on better-off peasants (the 'kulaks'). The fact that the Sukhanov family had one cow and an iron roof over their house led to the family becoming dispossessed in 1933 and forced to move to Moscow.

Alexander's inclination to the creative arts and desire to learn manifested itself early. At the age of fifteen he located an art school recently opened in Moscow. Only after he had been accepted and started his studies did he inform his family of the fact. He studied at the Moscow Secondary Art School (MCKHSH) from 1939 to 1944, under Vasily Pochitalov.

During the World War II, the school was evacuated to Bashkiria. The difficult conditions affecting daily living and study during wartime were mitigated by the director of the school, Nicolay Karrenberg. Sukhanov along with other students volunteered to work at the nearest collective farm in return for supplies of milk, bread, and some clothing. In another instance, he tried to enlist in the wartime army but was stopped by Karrenberg who considered him to be an astute and talented art students. He was especially well regarded for the plasticity of his drawings. In 1942–43 an exhibition of students' work was organized and shown first in Ufa and then in Moscow at the Tretyakov Gallery. A portrait of a girl by Sukhanov generated some interest. However, prospective buyers were surprised to discover that the artist had not yet graduated. The first year graduates from the school received high marks; every student was enrolled in college without exam.

== Education and artistic career ==
In 1944 Sukhanov entered the Moscow State Academic Art Institute named after V.N. Surikov and was assigned to the workshop led by Professor Sergey Gerasimov.

At the college Alexander met his future wife, Lavinia Bazhbeuk-Melikyan (illustration left, the portrait of Lavinia wearing a traditional Armenian taraz was painted by Sukhanov during the studies in Moscow), who lived and studied in Armenia before continuing her education in Moscow. In the summer of 1945 they took on a project to commemorate Armenian folk art traveling to the Zangezur region in the village of Verishen. There Lavinia made art reproductions of the ancient knotted Armenian carpets, and Sukhanov drew local copper utensils. His visual representations of metals accurately reproduced the textures and patina of the objects. Continuing their collaboration after graduation in 1951, they joined the workshop of Pavel Korin and worked together on the mosaic panel "Alexander Suvorov" for Komsomolskaya station in Moscow's metro. In 1952 the couple were married. In December 1954 their daughter Mariam was born in Yerevan.

Because of the prevailing Stalinist culture at that time, monumental projects of art approved by the Soviet cultural establishment provided a source of income for the family. Such commissions gave artists the right to practice professionally. In 1953 Sukhanov worked on two panels called "The Union of Science and Labour" and "Friendship of the Peoples of the USSR" for the Soviet pavilion of the international Leipzig Trade Fair. From 1954, he participated in the restorations of two panoramic paintings depicting historical events of 19th century. One panoramic view illustrated actions at the "Battle of Borodino" that took place in 1812 during Napoleon's invasion of Russia and another showed the "Siege of Sevastopol" that lasted between 1844 and 1855 during the Crimean War. These monumental 360-degree panoramic views were originally painted by Franz Roubaud using illusionistic effects to recreate a virtual reality of historical events.

In 1957 Sukhanov became a member of the Moscow branch of the Union of Artists of the USSR.

== Artistic style and influences ==
In 1957 Sukhanov moved with his family to the house known as the "Red House in Novogireevo", which was a residential building with artists' workshops built by graphic artist Vladimir Favorsky, sculptor Ivan Efimov and Lev Kardashov who designed the building plan. A meeting and subsequent friendship with the group of artists who worked there was the beginning of a prolific period for Sukhanov during which he found his own identity as an artist. Activities in the workshops were not limited to fine art but also included such decorative and commercial arts as printmaking, graphic illustrations and ceramics. A creative environment, the studios were known for a high degree of mutual support and encouragement. This was happening at the time when the Central Committee campaigned against "formalism" and imposed an official style of "socialist realism", this was an attempt to curb painters predilection for the originality of the artistic form and pictorial freedom. Despite these complex and difficult years Sukhanov practiced an unconventional painting style unrelated to the official dogma of the time.

Sukhanov explored novel methods in oil painting with the goal of bringing life and art closer together. His desire was to capture nature in its unspoiled form utilising colour to the full. His quest took him to remote regions – joining geological expeditions across the taiga in the Urals or traveling with his family in the Caucasus. In Armenia he went deep into the countryside visiting small, remote villages. Staying in areas of Zangezur in Eastern Armenia, Aragatsotn in the west and Sevan in Armenian highlands, Alexander not only gained insight and experience into the region, but also formed a special connection with the local people and their culture. He knew by heart poems by the Armenian poets Nahapet Kuchak and Sayat-Nova. Admiration for the art works of Armenian artists brought him to know Martiros Saryan and become friends with Minas Avetisyan.

His daughter Mariam married an artist, Christos Foukaras and moved to Cyprus. Sukhanov frequently visited them from 1987. There he was intrigued by light of the Mediterranean island where, even in gloomy weather, the grey tones of the landscape and the sea seemed to him to gleam. He painted numerous landscapes with a focus on reflecting transparency of the island's radiant colours.

== Late years ==
While "socialist realism" was the only acceptable method of art in the USSR, approved by the authorities in the mid-1930s, the boundaries and definition of the social realism method were questioned shortly after Stalin's death and became the subject of public discussion during the years of the "thaw". The gradual tightening of cultural policy in Moscow began in the mid-1960s and manifested itself primarily in the cessation of exhibitions of contemporary western art and control over the content of national exhibitions. Financing the fine arts, the state demanded loyalty from the authors of works in response. As a result, each large exhibition was conceived not as an artistic phenomenon but as a demonstration of cooperation between artists and the authorities. Striving to reconcile his art with the prevailing cultural mores caused Sukhanov to become disengaged and unwilling to adapt social norms to gain fame. His friends noted this inner struggle but said that he never compromised his artistic integrity.

The achievements came through hard work and a constant search for authentic artistic representation. Alexander's fellow artists noted how "it often seemed that he was reworking, mercilessly painting over what had been started beautifully... he had inside a fire striving for perfection and no one's advice would stop his determination". He participated in multiple group exhibitions locally and abroad, but did not have the opportunity to display his art in a solo show.

During the last two years of his life Sukhanov was not productive. Battling cancer he distanced himself from painting, the passion of his life. He died on April 3, 1995.

In 1996, as a tribute, a group of artists and family organised a retrospective of the artist's paintings. This first solo exhibition paid homage to Sukhanov as the artist who was "… a tuning fork among painters-peers because of his "absolute pitch" not only to colour and form, but also to artistic truth and human decency".

Sukhanov's works are in private and museum collections, such as the Ludwig Collection and Tretyakov Gallery.

== Bibliography ==
- Golitsyn, Ivan (2015). Илларион Голицын. Разговор об ИСКУССТВЕ [Illarion Golitsyn. Conversation about the Art.] (in Russian). Moscow: Publishing House "Russian World". ISBN 978-5-89577-219-5.
- Golitsyn, Illarion (1996). "ЭСТ". Александр Суханов. Живопись, графика [Alexander Sukhanov. Painting, drawings.]. By Bazhbeuk-Melikyan, Lavinia. "Artist's House Gallery" Catalogue (in Russian). Moscow: The "Artist's House" on Kuznetsky.
- Golomstock, Igor (1990). Problems in the Study of Stalinist Culture. New York: Palgrave Macmillan. ISBN 978-1-349-20651-3.
- Igityan, Henrik (1996). "ЭСТ". Александр Суханов. Живопись, графика [Alexander Sukhanov. Painting, drawings.]. By Bazhbeuk-Melikyan, Lavinia. "Artist's House Gallery" Catalogue (in Russian). Moscow: The "Artist's House" on Kuznetsky.
- Kenez, Peter (2006). A History of the Soviet Union from the Beginning to the End. New York: Cambridge University Press. ISBN 978-0-521-68296-1.
- Khachatrian, Shahen (1996). "ЭСТ". Александр Суханов. Живопись, графика [Alexander Sukhanov. Painting, drawings.]. By Bazhbeuk-Melikyan, Lavinia. "Artist's House Gallery" Catalogue (in Russian). Moscow: The "Artist's House" on Kuznetsky.
- Ludwig, Peter (2007). Non Conform. Russian and Soviet Art 1958–1995. New York: Prestel Publishing. ISBN 978-3-7913-3833-0.
- "Maslovka. Artists Town". www.maslovka.info. Life and Work of Moscow Artists. (in Russian)
- Otdelnova, Vera (2016). "Дискуссии о реализме в конце 1960–х гг. в стенограммах Московского отделения Союза художников РСФСР" [Discussions about realism in the late 1960s in the transcripts of the Moscow branch of the Union of Artists of the RSFSR.]. Observatory of Culture (in Russian). 13 (6): 746–754. doi:10.25281/2072-3156-2017-14-5-631-639.
- Otdelnova, Vera (2017). "Роль цензуры в формировании московских художественных выставок 1960–1970 годов" [The Role of Censorship in the Formation of Moscow Art Exhibitions in the 1960s— 1970s.]. Observatory of Culture (in Russian). 14 (5): 631–639. doi:10.25281/2072-3156-2017-14-5-631-639.
- Papikyan, Dogmara (1995). "Светлая память о художнике, Александр Фирсович Cyханов" [In loving memory of the artist, Alexander Firsovich Sykhanov]. Russian Artists Newspaper "Isograph" (in Russian). No. 6. Moscow. International Foundation for the "Encouragement of the Arts".
- "Professional Artists". www.painters.artunion.ru/english.htm. The United Register of the Professional Artists (Artist Trade Union of Russia).
- "Red house in Novogireevo". The house and workshops of Vladimir Favorsky and Ivan Efimov.
- Robinson, Neil (2002). Russia. A state of uncertainty. London: Routledge. ISBN 0-415-27112-6.
- Shakhovskoy, Dimitry (1996). "ЭСТ". Александр Суханов. Живопись, графика [Alexander Sukhanov. Painting, drawings.]. By Bazhbeuk-Melikyan, Lavinia. "Artist's House Gallery" Catalogue (in Russian). Moscow: The "Artist's House" on Kuznetsky.
- Simanchuk, Ilya (1982). У тех Синих Венцов... [Those Blue Crowns...] (in Russian). Moscow: Publishing House "Moscow's Worker".
- Sukhanova, Mariam (2015). Художники одной семьи [The Family of Painters.]. "Gallery Painting Art" Catalogue (in Russian). Moscow: Moscow Union of Artists.
- Zhilinsky, Dimitry (1996). "ЭСТ". Александр Суханов. Живопись, графика [Alexander Sukhanov. Painting, drawings.]. By Bazhbeuk-Melikyan, Lavinia. "Artist's House Gallery" Catalogue (in Russian). Moscow: The "Artist's House" on Kuznetsky.
- Zhilinsky, Dimitry (2006). Лавиния Бажбеук-Меликян [Lavinia Bazhbeuk-Melikyan.] (in Russian). Yerevan: Tigran Mets Publishing House. ISBN 99941-0-157-9.
