= Tomas Orbelli =

Georgian architect and painter (1951–2019)

- Томас Орбеллі
- Born: 16 February 1951; Tbilisi
- Died: 23 November 2019 (aged 68); Lviv
- Education: Tbilisi Polytechnic Institute
- Occupations: Architect, painter

Tomas Orbelli (Ukrainian: Томас Орбеллі; 16 February 1951 – 23 November 2019) was an architect and painter of Georgian origin.

== Biography ==
Tomas Orbelli was born on 16 February 1951 in Tbilisi.

After graduating from the Tbilisi Polytechnic Institute, he designed a large number of museums, philharmonic halls, hotels, sanatoriums, restaurants, recreation centers, and residential areas in the Georgian cities of Batumi, Kutaisi, Telavi, Zugdidi, and Tbilisi. He has received national and international awards and prizes for his work. He studied painting with the Georgian painter Lado Gudiashvili.

Later he moved to Lviv, where he worked as a street artist. He created primitivism-style paintings on cardboard, planks, and old records.

He died on 23 November 2019 in Lviv. He was buried at the Yanivskyi Cemetery.

== Honoring ==
The documentary film "Lviv Pirosmani" (directed by Liudmyla Tymoshenko) was made about the life and work of Thomas Orbelli.
