= Illarion Golitsyn =

Soviet and Russian artist (1928–2007)

- Илларион Владимирович Голицын
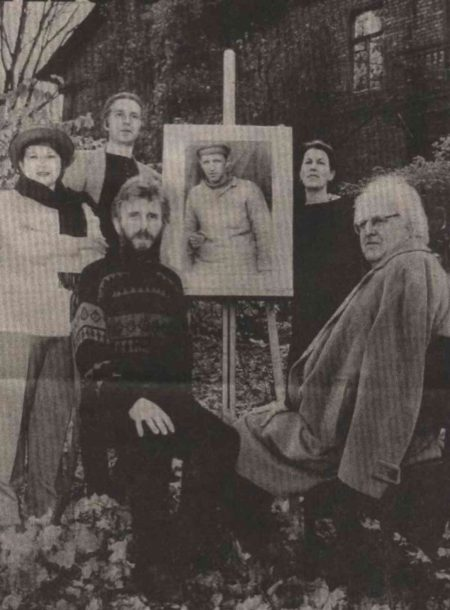
- Born: 20 May 1928; Moscow, Russia
- Died: 14 March 2007 (aged 78); Moscow, Russia
- Education: Stroganov Moscow State Academy of Arts and Industry
- Occupations: Painter; graphic artist; sculptor

Illarion Vladimirovich Golitsyn (Russian: Илларион Владимирович Голицын; May 20, 1928 – March 14, 2007) was a Soviet and Russian painter, graphic artist and sculptor, author of articles on art and art history.

== Life and career ==
Golitsyn was born in Moscow, to a family of graphic artist Vladimir Golitsyn and Elena Petrovna, née Countess Sheremeteva, thus coming from an old princely family of Golitsyn and the noble counts and princely family of Sheremetev.

He started to study art with his father Vladimir Golitsyn, and following the advice of Pavel Korin.

In 1946–1953, Golitsyn studied at the Stroganov Moscow State Academy of Arts and Industry, in the department of artistic woodworking. In 1957, he studied etching techniques at the Ignatius Nivinsky studio under E. S. Teis.

From the mid-1950s, he was close to Vladimir Favorsky and his “Novogireevo circle of independent artists” based at the outskirts of Moscow in Novogireevo district including Dmitry Zhilinsky, Nina Zhilinskaya, Dmitry Shakhovskoy, Ivan Efimov and Nina Efimova, Lev Kardashov and Lyudmila Kardashova.

In 1958, Golitsyn won a silver medal at the World Festival in Vienna for the engraving "On the Balcony", a work from the series "Everyday Life in the Suburbs" (1955–1957).

In March 1963, at a meeting with the Soviet art intelligentsia in Kremlin, Nikita Khrushchev publicly attacked poet Andrei Voznesensky and writer Vasily Aksenov, as well as Illarion Golitsyn, who supported Voznesensky. .

Until the 1970s, he worked mainly in the graphic genre, then painted a lot in oil and watercolor.

In 2003, for a series of paintings and graphic works "House in Novogireevo" he was awarded the State Prize of the Russian Federation in Literature and Art. .

Golitsyn was active art educator and teacher, promoting his artistic manner and views among his pupils, who included Ivan Golitsyn, Aharon April, Valentin Korzhov, Raphael Сanossa, Nikolaj Belkov, Leonid Borisov.

== Gallery ==
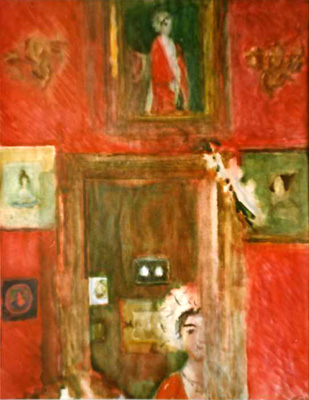
Looking Glass. 1992. Watercolor

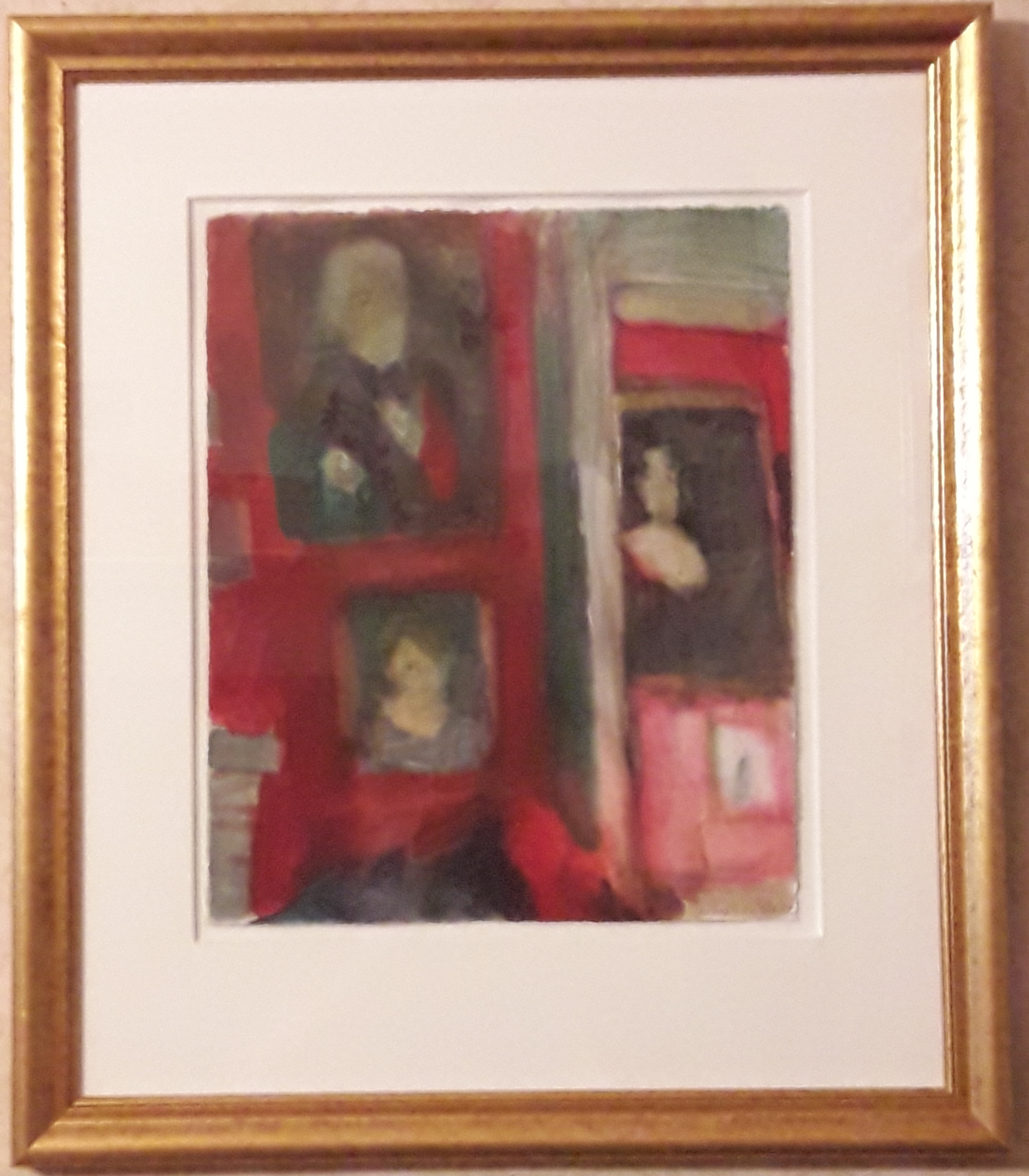
The Three Portraits, 1992. Gouache and Watercolor on cardboard, 38,5х31

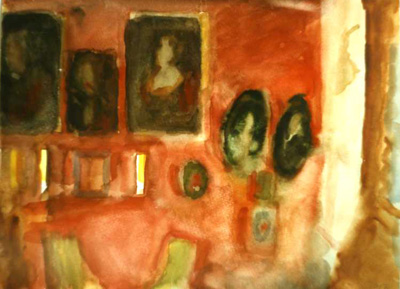
Glares. 1991. Watercolor

== Solo exhibitions ==
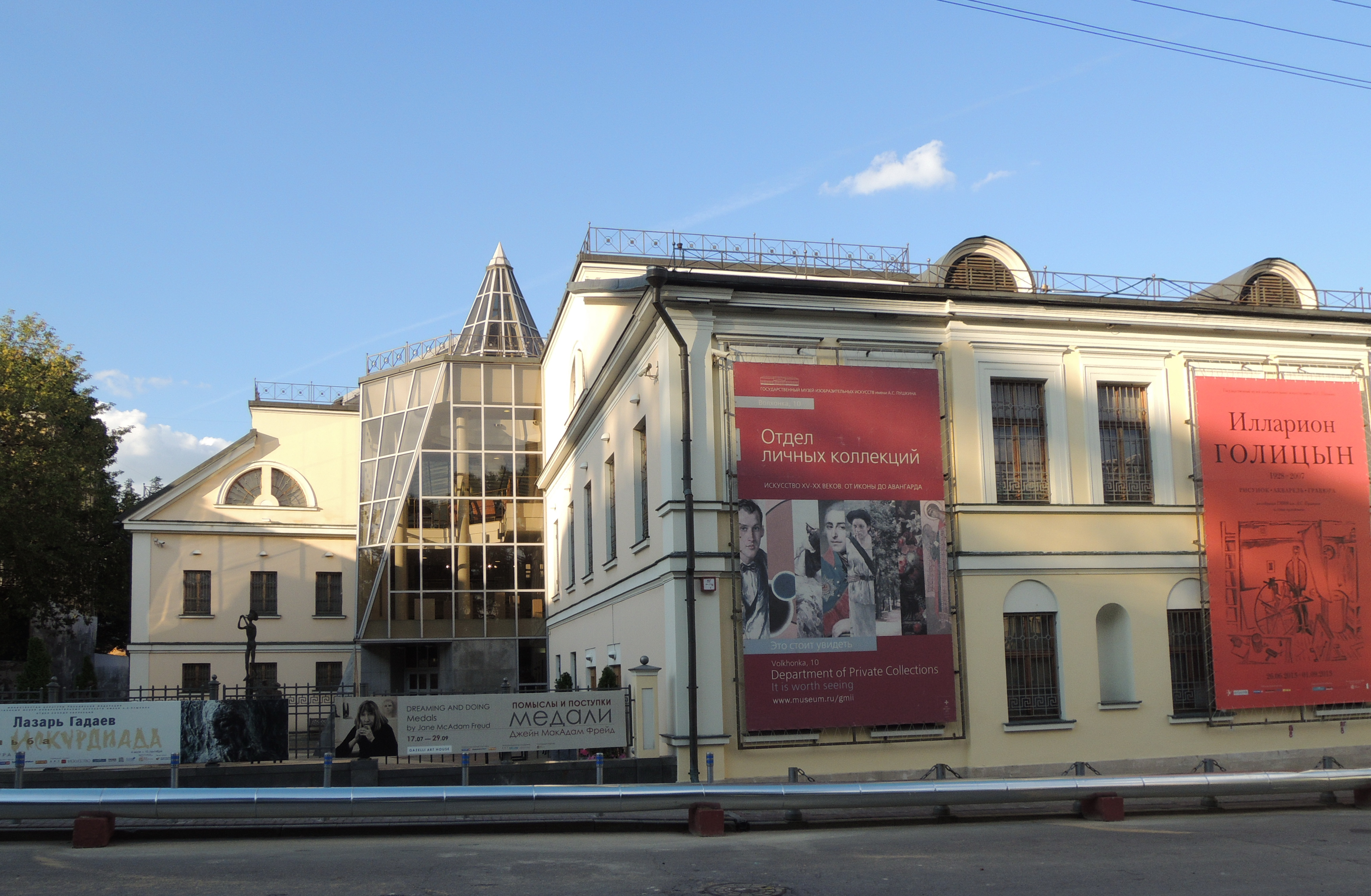
Poster for the exhibition at the Pushkin Museum (2013)

- 1962 — Editorial board of the magazine "Yunost".
- 1970 — Solo exhibition at the Pushkin State Museum of Fine Arts.
- 1979 — Solo exhibition. Exhibition hall of the MOSKh RSFSR.
- 1988 — Exhibition jointly with A. Pologova. Moscow House of Artists.
- 1993 — Solo exhibition "Watercolors from the collection of the Pushkin Museum of Fine Arts". The Pushkin State Museum of Fine Arts.
- 1999 — Personal exhibition. "Watercolor". The Tsarskoye Selo Collection Museum, Pushkin.
- 2001 — Personal exhibition "Light Canvases". The State Institute of Art Studies. Moscow.
- 2002 — Exhibition "The Golitsyn House". Russian Academy of Arts.
- 2005 — Personal exhibition "Illarion Golitsyn from the collection of the Russian Museum". St. Petersburg
- 2005 — Exhibition jointly with V. V. Kutsevich. A. N. Radishchev Saratov Art Museum.
- 2006 — Personal exhibition. Lipetsk Regional Art Gallery.
- 2008 — Personal exhibition for the 80th anniversary of her birth. The Russian Academy of Arts.
- 2008 — Personal exhibition for the 80th anniversary of her birth. From the collection of the Novgorod State United Museum-Reserve. Novgorod.
- 2009 — Personal exhibition. Gallery "Russian World". Paris.
- 2013 — Personal exhibition for the 85th anniversary of his birth. Pushkin State Museum of Fine Arts
- 2013 — "Illarion Golitsyn. To be yourself. For the 85th anniversary of his birth". State Tretyakov Gallery. Moscow

== Books and essays ==
- Conversation about art and about the artists. Articles. Stories / I. V. Golitsyn. — M: Russian World, 2015. — 608 p.: ill. — (Great Moscow Library).

== Sources ==
- Герчук, Юрий Яковлевич. Живописец Илларион Голицын. Москва, «Советский художник», 1979
- В. Г. Азаркович. Молодые мастера советской гравюры (И. В. Голицын, Г. Ф. Захаров, А. А. Ушин) // Очерки по русскому и советскому искусству. Сборник статей. Москва, «Советский художник», 1965.
- Елизавета Кузнецова. «Проблемы кураторов: горизонты нового искусства». Санкт-Петербург, издат. «Зеленая Амфора», 2021.
- Vladimir Kostin, "Образы жизни..." // Yunost (Moscow), No.10 (1963). [in Russian].
- Shella Drobkin, "From Russia to Israel with dreams" // The Montreal Suburban, 8 Nov 1975.
- Victor Lupan, "La colonie des artiste" // Figaro magazine (Paris), 12 February 1998.
- Evgraf Kontchin, "Competition with Light" // Kultura (Moscow), 26 June 2008. [in Russian].
- Dmitry Zhilinsky, "A Sad Monolog about Illarion Golitsyn" // Tretyakov Gallery Journal (Moscow), No.3/49 (2012)
- Карл Аймермахер, Евгений Барабанов, Александр Боровский, Галина Маневич и др. Нонконформисты. Второй русский авангард, 1955–1988. Собрание Бар-Гера / Ханс-Петер Ризе. — Кёльн: Wienand, 1996. — P. 92–96. — 320 p. — ISBN 3879094960.[11]
- Кононихин Н. Художники общества «Аполлон». Второй русский авангард. CD-ROM. — СПб., 1999
- Ольга Шихирева, Жан-Клод Маркадэ, Морис Тухман, Александр Боровский и др. Абстракция в России. Каталог выставки в Государственном Русском музее / Анна Лакс. — Санкт-Петербург: Palace Editions, 2001. — 814 p. — (Государственный Русский музей (альманах)). — ISBN 978-5-93332-059-3.
- Golitsyn, Ivan (2015). Илларион Голицын. Разговор об ИСКУССТВЕ [Illarion Golitsyn. Conversation about the Art.] (in Russian). Moscow: Publishing House "Russian World". ISBN 978-5-89577-219-5.
- Golitsyn, Illarion (1996). "ЭСТ". Александр Суханов. Живопись, графика [Alexander Sukhanov. Painting, drawings.]. By Bazhbeuk-Melikyan, Lavinia. "Artist's House Gallery" Catalogue (in Russian). Moscow: The "Artist's House" on Kuznetsky.
- Kenez, Peter (2006). A History of the Soviet Union from the Beginning to the End. New York: Cambridge University Press. ISBN 978-0-521-68296-1.
- Ludwig, Peter (2007). Non Conform. Russian and Soviet Art 1958–1995. New York: Prestel Publishing. ISBN 978-3-7913-3833-0.
- Otdelnova, Vera (2016). "Дискуссии о реализме в конце 1960–х гг. в стенограммах Московского отделения Союза художников РСФСР" [Discussions about realism in the late 1960s in the transcripts of the Moscow branch of the Union of Artists of the RSFSR.]. Observatory of Culture (in Russian). 13 (6): 746–754. doi:10.25281/2072-3156-2017-14-5-631-639
- "Red house in Novogireevo". Retrieved 28 May 2022. The house and workshops of Vladimir Favorsky and Ivan Efimov.
- Simanchuk, Ilya (1982). У тех Синих Венцов... [Those Blue Crowns...] (in Russian). Moscow: Publishing House "Moscow's Worker".
- Sukhanova, Mariam (2015). Художники одной семьи [The Family of Painters.]. "Gallery Painting Art" Catalogue (in Russian). Moscow: Moscow Union of Artists.
- Zhilinsky, Dimitry (2006). Лавиния Бажбеук-Меликян [Lavinia Bazhbeuk-Melikyan.] (in Russian). Yerevan: Tigran Mets Publishing House. ISBN 978-99941-0-157-3.
