= Adelaida Semyonovna Simonovitch =

Russian educator

- 1864
- Born: Adelaida Semyonova Bergman; 1844; Moscow, Russian Empire
- Died: 1933 (aged 88–89); Zagorsk, RSFSR, Soviet Union
- Occupations: educator, kindergarten founder and theorist
- Known for: founding the first kindergarten in Russia

Adelaida Semyonovna Simonovitch (Russian: Аделаида Семёновна Симонович 1844–1933) was a Russian educator and the founder of the first kindergarten in Russia. She also was the first Russian theorist of public preschool education and published books and journals advocating early childhood development.

== Early life ==
Adelaida Semyonovna Bergman (Russian: Аделаида Семёновна Бергман) was born in 1844 in Moscow, Russia to Augustina (née Gutsohn) and Semyon Bergman. Her parents were merchants of German-Jewish heritage, who owned and operated their own mercantile business. There were three sisters, Adelaide, Sofya and Valentina and one brother, Alexander, in the family. As was typical for the era, Bergman attended five years of schooling and then studied on her own to be able to pass the examination to be qualified as a home teacher. Feeling her education was inadequate, Bergman asked to attend lectures at Moscow University, but permission was refused. In 1864, newly married to the physician Yakov Mironovich Simonovich, she decided to go abroad to study in Geneva, where women were allowed to attend university. Studying under the niece of Friedrich Fröbel, she learned his pedagogical methods and originally planned to remain in Switzerland and run a school for immigrants. They traveled to Germany to learn how schools were organized there. Having met and discussed her ideas with Alexander Herzen, whom she greatly admired, she changed her plans and became determined to take what she had learned back to Russia.

== Career ==
In 1866, Simonovitch and her husband returned to Russia and opened the first Russian kindergarten in Saint Petersburg. Simultaneously, the couple began to publish the first Russian magazine dedicated to preschool education, which they called Detskiy sad (Russian: Детский сад, meaning kindergarten). Though the magazine was short-lived, publishing only until 1868, it espoused the benefits of public education and was a forum to reshape Fröbel's ideas with a Russian context. Drawing on the pedagogical work of Konstantin Ushinsky, Simonovitcha published a mixture of articles on children's literature, pedagogical critique, public education, sample lesson plans, and included games and stories for children. In 1870, the couple relocated to Tbilisi and opened a new school for international students. Their students spoke Armenian, Georgian and Russian, giving birth to the concept of a bilingual school servicing a variety of ethnic groups. In 1874, she published a compilation of the articles which had previously been printed in Detskiy sad, under the title Practical Notes on the Individual and Public Education of Young Children (Russian: Практические заметки об индивидуальном и общественном воспитании малолетних детей). Widely influential, the book was reprinted in 1884.

After six years, Dr. Simonovitch was offered a post in Saint Petersburg at a children's hospital and the couple returned to the capital. By this time, Simonovitcha had six children of her own, was helping to raise her nephew Valentin Serov and had reopened a small school. When the Bestuzhev Courses were finally opened in 1878, and began accepting women for higher education in Russia, Simonovitcha immediately began attending courses in history and philology. The following year, she and her husband adopted the daughter, Olga Trubnikova, of a deceased former patient of her husband. Trubnikova would later become the wife of Serov. Within four years in 1883, her husband would die of typhus, having contracted the illness at his work.

Upon her husband's death, Simonovitcha moved to the Tver Oblast and settled on the estate of her son-in-law, Vladimir Derviz, who was married to her daughter, Nadia. She taught at a rural school in Kalachaevsky and organized the first nursery schools in Russia to care for children in the summers when she was not teaching. Teaching at the school for eleven years, Simonovitcha introduced the study of geography and nature to her classes, encouraging students to observe the habitat around them. She also instituted training for mothers to instruct them on hygiene and parenting, as she felt kindergarten was a bridge between family and becoming part of the larger society. Simonovitcha taught that children under three should be nurtured in their families and then begin socialization in kindergartens, in which their natural curiosity would be stimulated by interaction with their peers. Gradually, once they had mastered coherent speech, motor skills and self-control, around the age of six or seven, children would be ready to learn the alphabet and numbers and start actual education.

Besides her work, Simonovitcha cultivated creativity in her children. At the Domotkanovo Estate, the family circle included Ivan Bilibin, Ivan Efimov, Vladimir Favorsky, and Sevov, among others. In 1907, Simonovitcha published Kindergarten: A Practical Guide for Children's Gardeners (Russian: Детский сад: практическое руководство для детских садовниц), which was illustrated by her daughter, Nina Simonovich-Efimova. Despite the recognition of her work by the Tver Provincial Council and their assurances that the estate would continue to serve as her home, in 1918 during the Russian Civil War, Simonovitcha was forced to leave the estate.

== Death and legacy ==
Simonovitcha died in 1933. She is remembered as one of the pioneers of the development of pre-school pedagogy in Russia.
