= Boris Kravchenko =

Russian composer

Boris Petrovich Kravchenko (Борис Петрович Кравченко) (29 November 1929 in Leningrad – 9 February 1979 in Leningrad) was a Russian composer.

== Works ==
- Puppet opera for the State Puppet Theatre of Fairy Tales after Pushkin's The Tale of the Priest and of His Workman Balda (Сказка о попе и работнике его Балде) 1972
