= State Puppet Theatre of Fairy Tales =

Russian puppet theatre

- St. Petersburg State Budgetary Institution of Culture "Fairy Tale Puppet Theater"
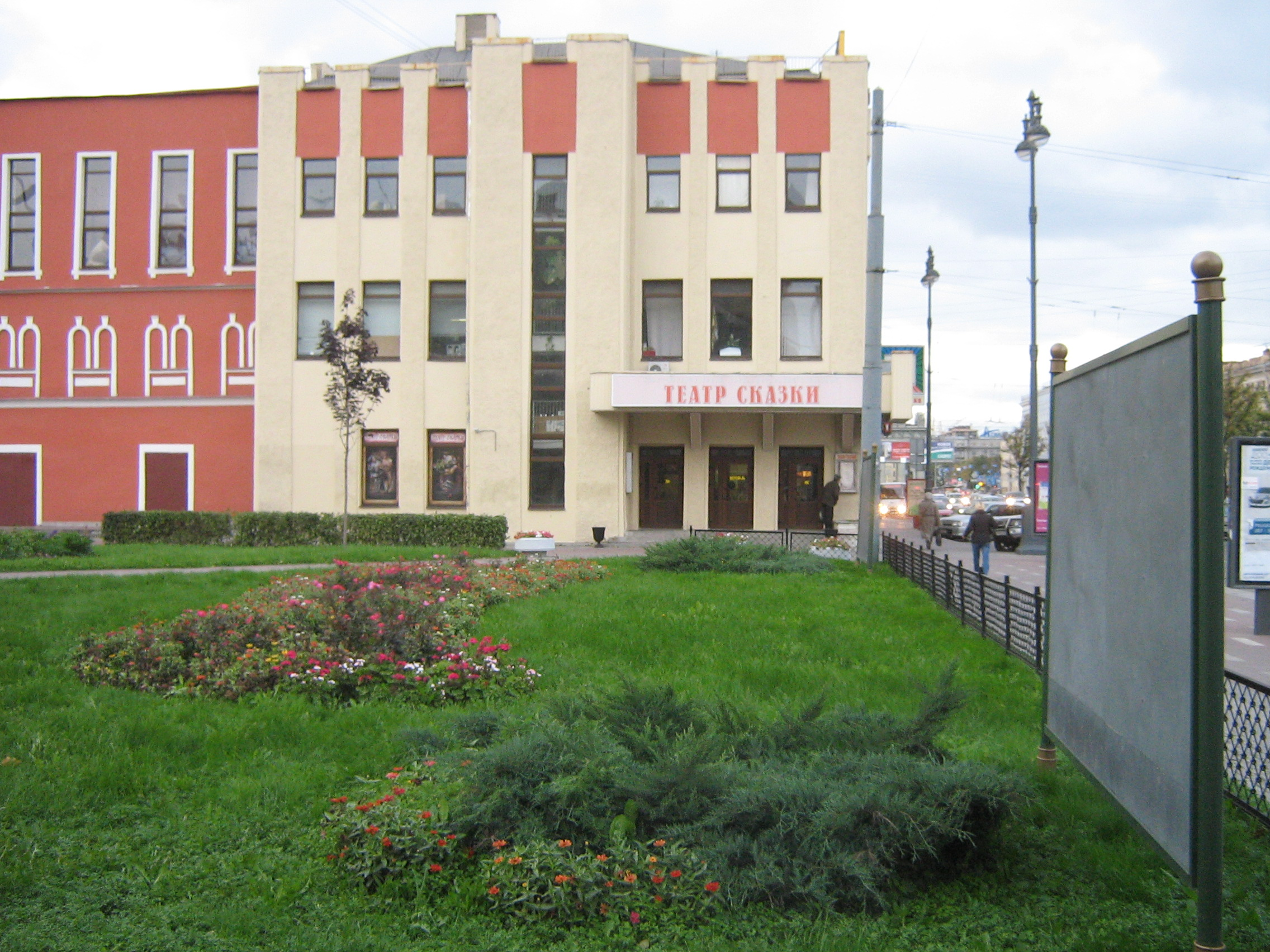
- Formation: December 31, 1944; 81 years ago
- Founder: Committee for Culture of St. Petersburg
- Founded at: Leningrad (St. Petersburg), Russia
- Legal status: Theater
- Purpose: Russian Puppetry
- Official language: Russian
- Main Director: Dorozhko Svetlana Leontievna
- Director: Lavrov Nikolay Alexandrovich
- Chief Artist: Philip Igorevich Ignatiev
- Awards: All-Russian Theater Award "Golden Mask", Highest Theater Award of St. Petersburg "Golden Sofit," State Prize of Russia.
- Website: https://teatrskazki.spb.ru/

The Saint Petersburg State Puppet Theatre of Fairy Tales also known as the "Fairy Tale Theater" Russian: (Санкт-Петербургский государственный кукольный театр сказки) is an all-ages, Russian puppet theatre focused on imaginative, morallic performances based around personifying the world through quixotic fantasy and peaceful conditions. The theater currently has a repertoire comprised on 28 fairy tales, including "Aladdin and the magic lamp," "Aybolit," "The Wizard of Oz," and "Little Longnose." They are also recognized as one of the best puppet theaters in Russia. In 2017, the theater began offering educational classes as part of the project "Theater Time," launched for students in primary school all the way to grades 5-11 as a way to educate them on the profession of puppetry. They mostly cater to children due to the playful and charming nature of the puppet designs and performance themes, along with absence of harsh language or overly heavy subject matter.

== History ==
Following the fall of the Berlin Wall and near the end of WW2, the "Fairy Tale Theater" had its first performance on December 31, 1944, as a way to help the children of Leningrad alleviate their stress and fear from the war around them.

In the beginning of the 1970s, then lead Creative Director and Honored Art Worker of the Russian Federation Yuri Eliseev invited Theatrical Production Designer Nelly Polyakova, another Honored Art Worker of the Russian Federation, and Director/Playwright, yet another Honored Worker of Arts of Russia, Nikolai Borovkov to collaborate.

Currently, there are 20 actors and actresses working as part of the Fairy Tale Theater, all of them award-winning performers, with two acting as the principle figures, Emilia Kulikova [born Emilia Sergeevna] and Valentin Morozov. The company tours regularly throughout Europe and has been to the United States.

== Repertoire ==
The composer Boris Kravchenko wrote music for many of the company's productions, following the simple and expressive style of Russian folk songs.

The current repertoire consists of 33 fairy-tales of Russian, European, and American orientation.

1. African Forest Tales
2. Aibolit
3. Aladdin and the magic lamp
4. The Wizard of Oz
5. Wild Swans
6. Butterfly Story
7. How Teryoshechka defeated the witch!
8. The Little Humpbacked Horse
9. Cat and Mouse
10. Who will wake up the sun?
11. Three Pigs
12. Pinocchio against Karabas or "Long live Santa Claus!"
13. The Adventures of an Unlucky Dragon
14. Fox-Cork
15. A Tale of King Sultan
16. Really, we will always be?
17. Mermaid
18. The tale of the dead princess and seven heros
19. The tale of the capricious princess and King of the frogs
20. Lyushin's Fairy Tales
21. Santa Claus and Aliens
22. Once upon Thumbelina
23. Little Longnose
24. Chu-ko-ko
25. Binky's Curious Cub
26. Masha and the Bear
27. Blue Beard
28. Snoggle (Green Blood)
29. Black Chicken
30. The Nutcracker and the Mouse King
31. The Snow Queen
32. Elion v.2
33. Little Muck

== See also ==
- Russian puppet theater
- Russian Theatrical Society
