= Alexander Bazhbeuk-Melikyan =

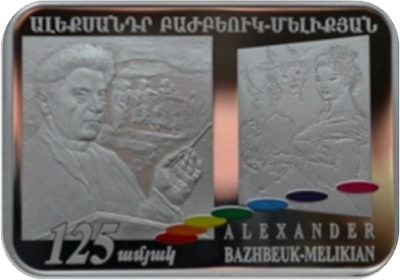
- Born: 11 September 1891; Tiflis, Russian Empire (now Tbilisi, Georgia)
- Died: 20 July 1966 (aged 74); Tbilisi, Georgia
- Education: St. Petersburg Academy of Arts
- Known for: Fine Art, Graphic Arts, Sculpture, Architecture
- Movement: Symbolism, Futurism
- Spouse(s): Nektar (née Khojamiryan), Lydia (née Meshkorudnikova)
- Children: 3, including Lavinia Bazhbeuk-Melikyan, Zuleika Bazhbeuk-Melikyan
- Awards: Honored Artist of the Georgian SSR

Alexander Bazhbeuk-Melikyan (Armenian: Ալեքսանդր Բաժբեուկ-Մելիքյան, Georgian: ალექსანდრე ბაჟბეუქ-მელიქიანი, Russian: Александр Александрович Бажбеук-Меликов; 11 September 1891 – 20 July 1966) was a Soviet Georgian artist, graphic designer and sculptor of Armenian origin.

== Early life ==
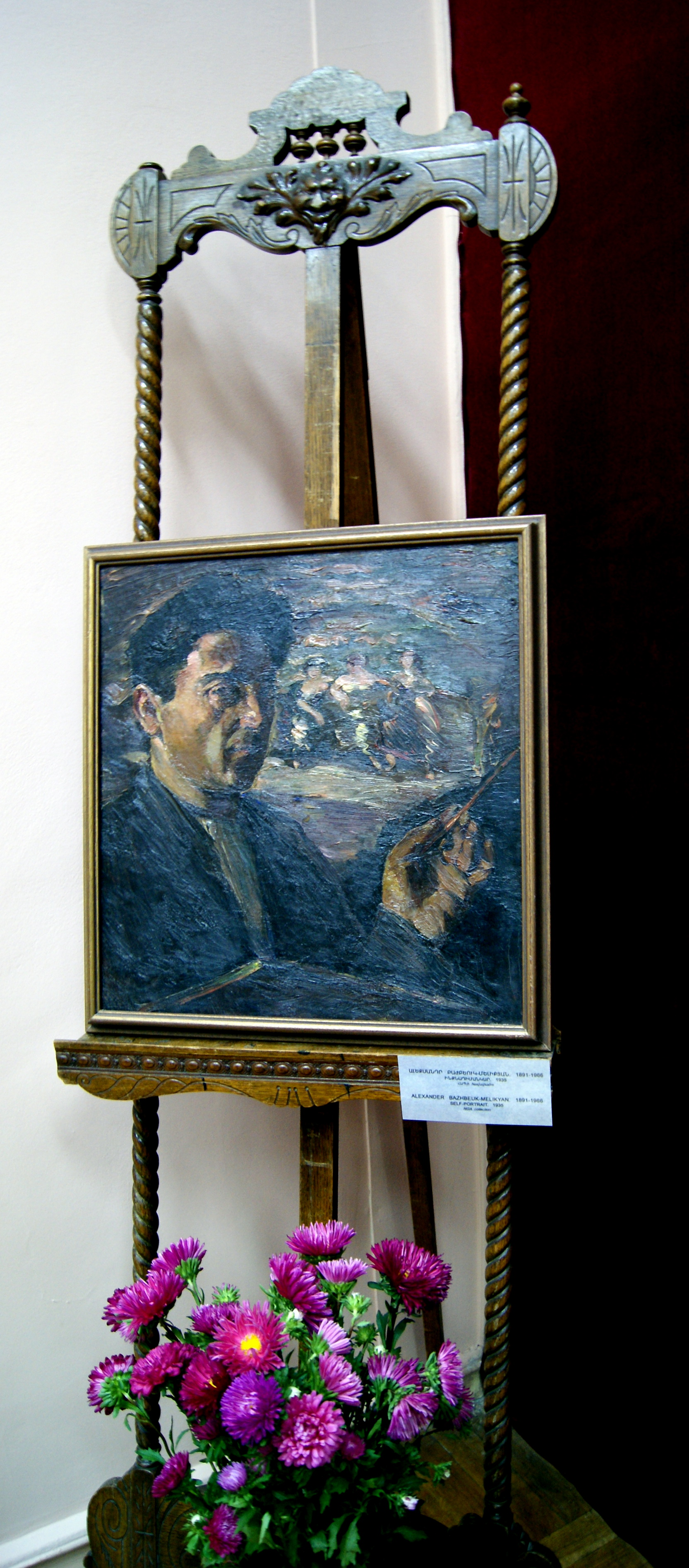
Bazhbeuk-Melikyans. Two generations, National Gallery of Armenia

Alexander Alexandrovich Bazhbeuk-Melikyan was born in Tbilisi, Georgia. In 1903, he began his studies at the School of Art and Sculpture of the Caucasus Society for the Encouragement of the Fine Arts. Here he made the acquaintance of a fellow student, Lado Gudiashvili. In 1910, he travelled to Moscow to begin training in the studio of the artist V. N. Meshkov. The following year, he joined the St. Petersburg Academy of Arts.

In 1913, Bazhbeuk-Melikyan was drafted into the Imperial Russian Army, and spent the World War I years on the Odessa front.

In 1917, he returned to Tbilisi and began his own independent artistic career.

In 1919, he met his first wife, Nektar (née Khojamiryan), an architect with whom he had one daughter, Lavinia Bazhbeuk-Melikyan. From a later marriage to Lydia (née Meshkorudnikova), he had two more children: a son, Vazgen, and a daughter, Zuleika Bazhbeuk-Melikyan. Both daughters were to become artists in their own right.

== Career ==
Between 1922 and 1929 Bazhbeuk-Melikyan taught at the studio of Mose Toidze, following which he taught at the Georgian Academy of Arts till 1938.

In the 1920s, Bazhbeuk-Melikyan was an active participant in the Tbilisi avant-garde, collaborating with Futurists such as the poet Kara-Darvish, and Georgian painters such as David Kakabadze.

In 1935, Bazhbeuk-Melikyan became friends with the nationalist poets Yegishe Charents and Titian Tabidze, which led to the attention of the NKVD. When, in 1937, the newspaper Dawn of the East published an article naming him an enemy of the people, he was expelled from the Union of Artists of Georgia. Charents and Tabidze were both executed that same year, and Bazhbeuk-Melikyan lived in fear of arrest. That did not come to pass, and when he painted his Spanish guerrillas in support of the Republicans in the Spanish Civil War, he was rehabilitated.

In 1961, he was awarded the title of Honored Artist of the Georgian Soviet Socialist Republic.

His family estimates that Bazhbeuk-Melikyan painted over two thousand canvases, but ruthlessly pruned them down to about a hundred. Given his perfectionism, every time he created a new work, he would go over his old paintings and destroy any that did not meet his uncompromising standard. When his daughter Lavinia created a catalogue of his paintings in 1936, there were 110 pieces. In 1966, after his death, there still were only 110 works remaining.

=== Artistic style ===
Bazhbeuk-Melikyan is noted for his depiction of female figures; such as magicians, jugglers, exotically costumed women, and nudes. Like his friend Gudiashvili, he painted voluptuous women, but he was more intensely executed and more passionate. He led a quiet protest against the prudish Soviet authorities who had a puritanical attitude to sex. Influenced by Böcklin, he created carefully finished canvases; later works, inspired by Rembrandt, was more luscious. His works were executed with dynamic and impulsive strokes and infused with colour, following the colorists of the previous centuries.

The circus theme occupied an important place in his oeuvre from his earliest years, and he dedicated much of his talent to its poetic and magical world. In the circus, he saw the ancient traditions that had survived to his day, and admired the plastic beauty of its presentations. At the same time, Bazhbeuk-Melikyan was inspired by the unique life of the old quarters of the Transcaucasian cities, which he painted in canvases such as the Courtyard with a bear (1925), and Mill in Ortachalah (1930). Until the mid-1930s, the artist, as a rule, chose a dark color scheme that hearkened back to the paintings of classical artists. He loved the interplay of contrast that would unexpectedly and dramatically light up aspects of figures and objects. He combined the acute sensibility of a modern artist with his own personal whimsy. The worlds he created were romantic. In the eternal themes that had appeared to be depleted over the century, he found a new and unexpected twist: in his interpretation, they were infused with a modern feel.

The range of subjects Bazhbeuk-Melikyan painted remained fairly stable. He repeatedly varied his favorite motifs. However, over the years the nature of the emotional structure of his paintings has changed. Romantic mystery and ambiguity gradually gave way in the 1940s to a more immediate, impulsive style. The monochrome colour scheme which corresponded to his first perceptions was replaced by a bright multicoloured palette.

=== Exhibitions ===
In 1919, along with Lado Gudiashvili, he opened an exhibition of his works in Tbilisi.

In 1935, he held his first solo exhibition in Yerevan, Armenia. This attracted much attention among the Armenian intelligentsia, who were still unfamiliar with his work. The exhibition was a huge success. Lilya Brik wrote that it was an unexpected joy.

In 1968, a posthumous exhibition was organised in Tbilisi, Moscow and Yerevan.

== Later life ==
In the 1960s, Bazhbeuk-Melikyan made frequent trips to Yerevan, where he met, befriended and encouraged young Armenian artists, including Minas Avetissian.

Between 1964 and 1966, although in poor health, he continued to work.

Bazhbeuk-Melikyan died on 20 July 1966 in Tbilisi.

== Press ==
In 2003, twenty-one of his canvases were stolen from his daughter Lavinia's apartment.
