= Skomorokh =

Medieval East Slavic performers

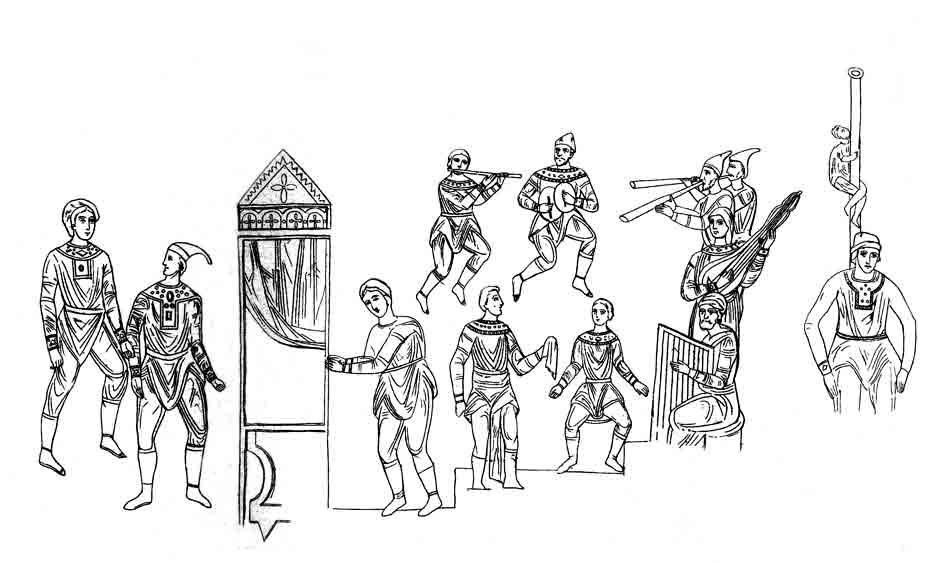
Musicians and skomorokhs. An outline of a fresco from Saint Sophia Cathedral, Kyiv, 11th century

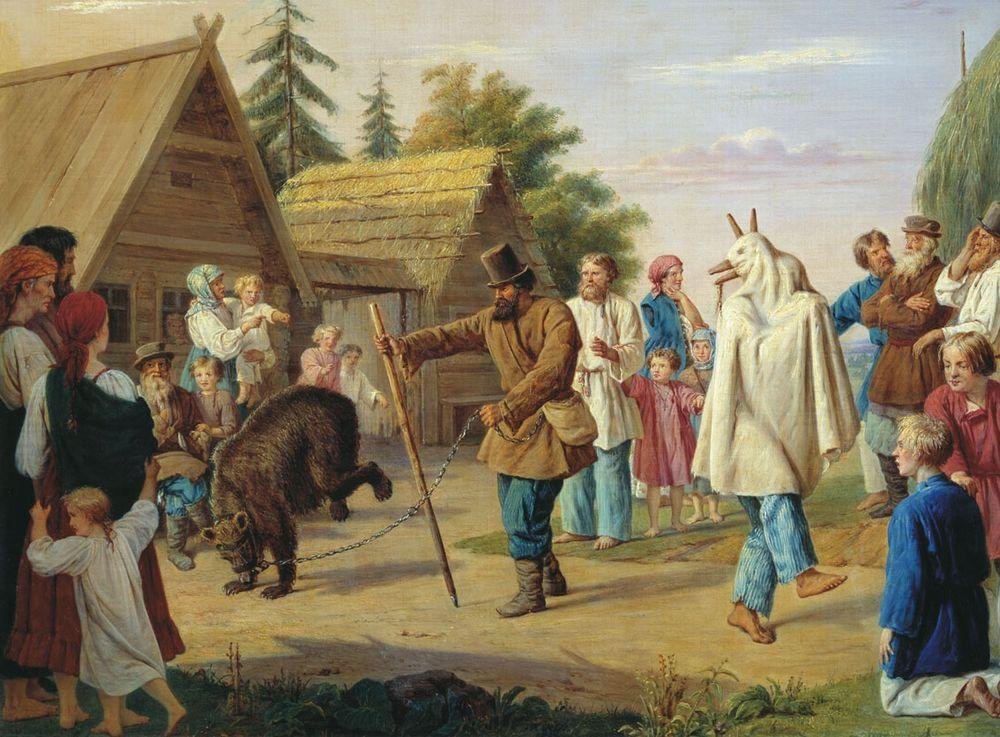
Skomorokhs in a village, François Riss, 1857

A skomorokh (Russian and Ukrainian: скоморох, Belarusian: скамарох, Old East Slavic: скоморохъ, Church Slavonic: скоморахъ) was a medieval East Slavic actor, who could also sing, dance, play musical instruments and compose for oral/musical and dramatic performances. The term has an unclear etymology.

== Etymology ==
The etymology of the word is not completely clear. There are hypotheses that the word is derived from the Greek term σκώμμαρχος (skōmmarkhos), from σκῶμμα (skōmma, 'joke'); from the Italian term scaramuccia ('joker', cf. English scaramouch); from the Arabic term مسخرة (masẋara); and many others.

== History ==
The skomorokhs appeared in Kievan Rus' no later than the mid-11th century, but fresco depictions of skomorokh musicians in the Saint Sophia Cathedral in Kyiv date to the 11th century.

The Primary Chronicle on skomorokhs concurs with the period. The monk chronicler denounced them as devil servants. Furthermore, the Eastern Orthodox Church often railed against them and other elements of popular culture as being irreverent, detracting from the worship of God, or being downright diabolical. For example, Theodosius of Kiev, one of the co-founders of the Caves Monastery in the 11th century, called the skomorokhs "evils to be shunned by good Christians". Their art was related and addressed to the common people and usually opposed the ruling groups. They were considered not just useless but even ideologically detrimental and dangerous by both the feudalists and the clergy.

Skomorokhs were persecuted in the years of the Mongol yoke (1230s), when the church strenuously propagated ascetic living. Their art reached its peak in the 15th to the 17th centuries. Their repertoire included mock songs, dramatic and satirical sketches, called глумы (glumy) in Russian or глуми (hlumy) in Ukrainian, performed in masks and skomorokh dresses to the sounds of domra, balalaika, gudok, bagpipes, or buben (a kind of tambourine). The appearance of Russian puppet theatre was directly associated with skomorokh performances.

Skomorokhs performed in the streets and city squares, engaging with the spectators to draw them into their play. Usually, the main character of the skomorokh performance was a fun-loving saucy muzhyk (Ukrainian: мужик) of comic simplicity. In the 16th and 17th centuries, skomorokhs would sometimes combine their efforts and perform in a vataha (ватага, 'big crowd'), numbering 70 to 100 people. The skomorokhs were often persecuted by the Russian Orthodox Church and civilian authorities.

In 1648 and 1657, Tsar Alexei Mikhailovich issued ukases banning skomorokh art as blasphemous, their inventory was destroyed, skomorokhs fell into captivity, were pursued but actors would still occasionally perform during popular celebrations. In the 18th century, skomorokh art gradually died away; passing on some of its traditions to the balahans (балаган) and rayoks (райок).

The role of the skomorokhs in the preservation and dissemination of folklore was closely linked with their important contribution to the development of secular music, first in Kievan Rus' and later in Muscovite Russia. Before the introduction of Christianity in the late tenth century, Kievan music was characterized primarily by ritualistic songs of worship, ceremonial (e.g., wedding, funeral) songs, and seasonal songs such as koliadky and haivky. With Byzantine Christianity came Byzantine chant and a vigorous attempt to suppress native music because of its close identification with paganism. This attempted suppression was only partially successful, because it was mainly aimed at the more populous urban centers and left the remote rural areas with their flourishing folk music relatively untouched.

== See also ==
- Bandurists
- Busking
- Goliards
- Kobzar
- Lirnyks
- Minstrel
- Troubadour
