= Zuleika Bazhbeuk-Melikyan =

Armenian painter (born 1939)

- Զուլեյկա Բաժբեուկ-Մելիքյան
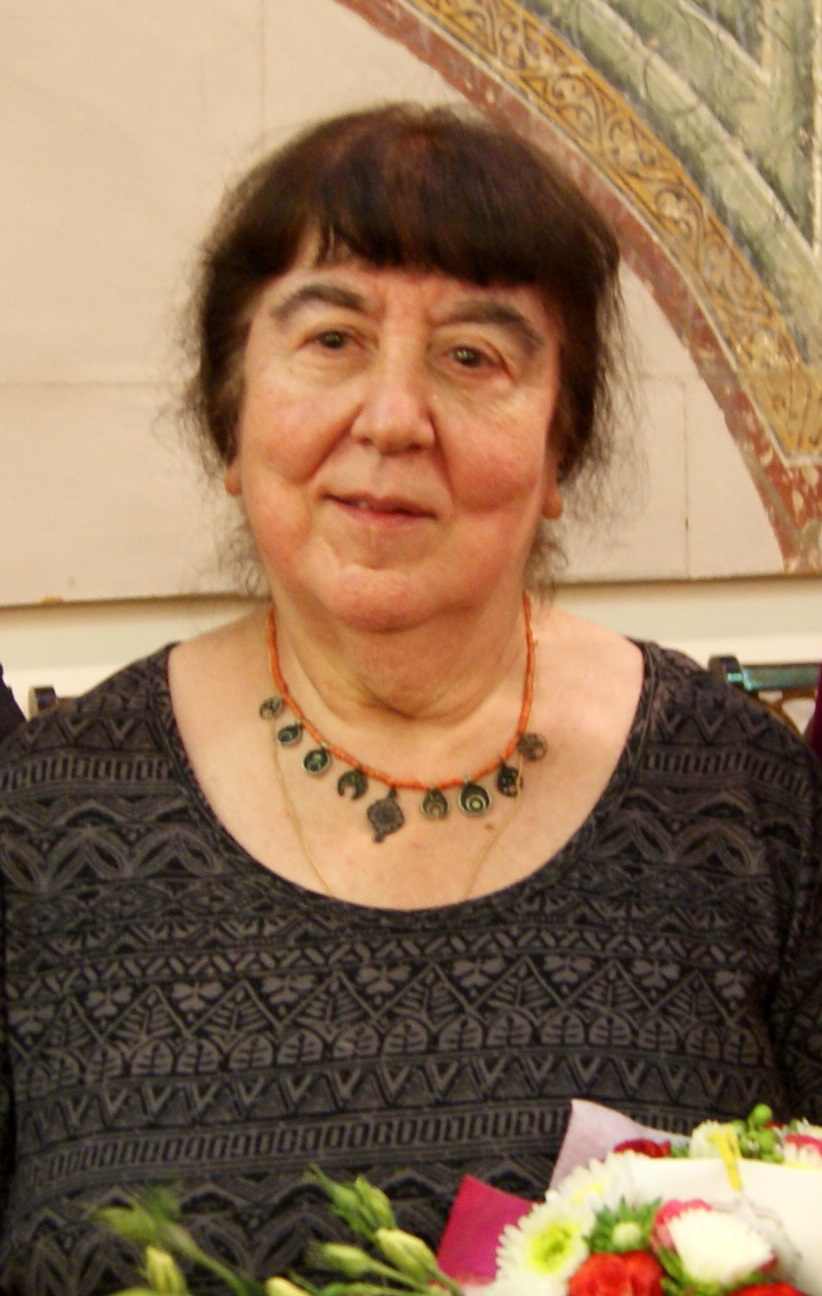
- photograph of Armenian painter Zuleika Bazhbeuk-Melikyan
- Born: 1939 (age 86–87)

Zuleika Bazhbeuk-Melikyan (Armnenian: Զուլեյկա Բաժբեուկ-Մելիքյան; born 1939) is an Armenian painter. She is daughter to Alexander Bazhbeuk-Melikyan.

== Biography ==
Her work was shown at the Armenian National Gallery September 16, 2016 alongside her father and siblings in a show curated by Margarita Khachatryan. Her painting style continues in the tradition of the Tbilisi State Academy of Arts in Georgia and brought a new life to the fine art of the seventies. Her multilayered and pointillist method, incarnated with theatrical and romantic soul, express luminosity; They are both emotional and musical. She has been called a, "musician with a brush in her hand".
