= Lavinia Bazhbeuk-Melikyan =

Armenian painter (1922–2005)

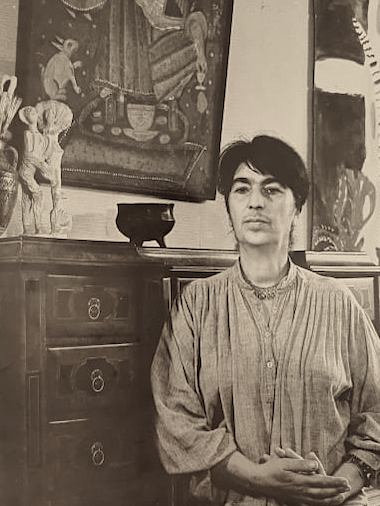
- Born: April 3, 1922; Tbilisi, Georgia
- Died: November 8, 2005 (age 83); Yerevan, Armenia
- Known for: Fine Art
- Awards: People's Artist of the Armenian Soviet Socialist Republic

Lavinia Bazhbeuk-Melikyan (Armenian: Լավինիա Բաժբեուկ-Մելիքյան, April 3, 1922 – November 8, 2005) was a Soviet-Armenian painter who was a full member of the Russian Academy of Arts, and a People's Artist of the Armenian SSR.

== Biography ==
Lavinia Bazhbeuk-Melikyan was born in 1922 in Tbilisi in the family of artist, graphic designer, and sculptor Alexander Bazhbeuk-Melikyan. In 1935 she moved to Yerevan, and studied at the Yerevan State College of Fine Arts named after Panos Terlemezyan. In 1951 she graduated from the Moscow State Academic Art Institute named after V.N. Surikov. In Pavel Korin’s studios she worked on the creation of the inlaid panels for Moscow “Komsomolskaya” metro station.

From 1962-1964 Lavinia had been a member of the board of administration for the Artists’ Artists Union, she was the delegate of the 2nd All-union Congress of Artists.

Since 1988 she has been a corresponding member of the Art Academy of Russia and, since 1997 – the Honored Art Worker of the Russian Federation. Since 2002 – a full member of the Russian Academy of Arts.

Her works are kept in the Modern Art Museum (Yerevan), the National Gallery of Armenia (Yerevan), artistic funds of Armenia and Russia, and in many private galleries and collections in different countries of the world.

On 19 September 2000, Lavinia Bazhbeuk-Melikyan obtained citizenship of the Russian Federation.

Lavinia Bazhbeuk-Melikyan died on November 8, 2005.

== Exhibitions ==
Since 1951 Lavinia was a constant participant of republican, all-union and international exhibitions.

- Painters house, Yerevan, 1979
- Moscow, 1980

=== Personal exhibitions ===
- 1979 – Yerevan
- 1980 – Moscow
- 1989 – Luanda, Angola
- 01.10.2008 -14.10.2008 Artists' Union of Armenia, Yerevan
- 10.04.2007 - 06.05.2007 Russian Academy of Artists, Moscow

== Awards ==
- 1967 – Honored artist of Armenian
- 1970 – she was awarded the Gold Medal of the USSR exhibition of economic achievements (VDNKH), Moscow
- 1974 – for the portraits series was awarded the Diploma of the USSR Artists’ Union.
- 1983 – People’s artist of the Armenian Soviet Socialist Republic
- 1997 – Honored Artist of the Russian Federation

== Works ==
- Father's-Alexander Bazhbeuk-Melikyan's portrait (1960)
- Mother (1961)
- Still life with books (1970)
- Self-portrait (1978)
- Painter Nina Zhilinskaya (1984)
- Aghabalyants sisters' portrait (1994)
- M. Khachatryan's portrait (1996)
- The Cactuses
