= Lado Gudiashvili =

Georgian artist

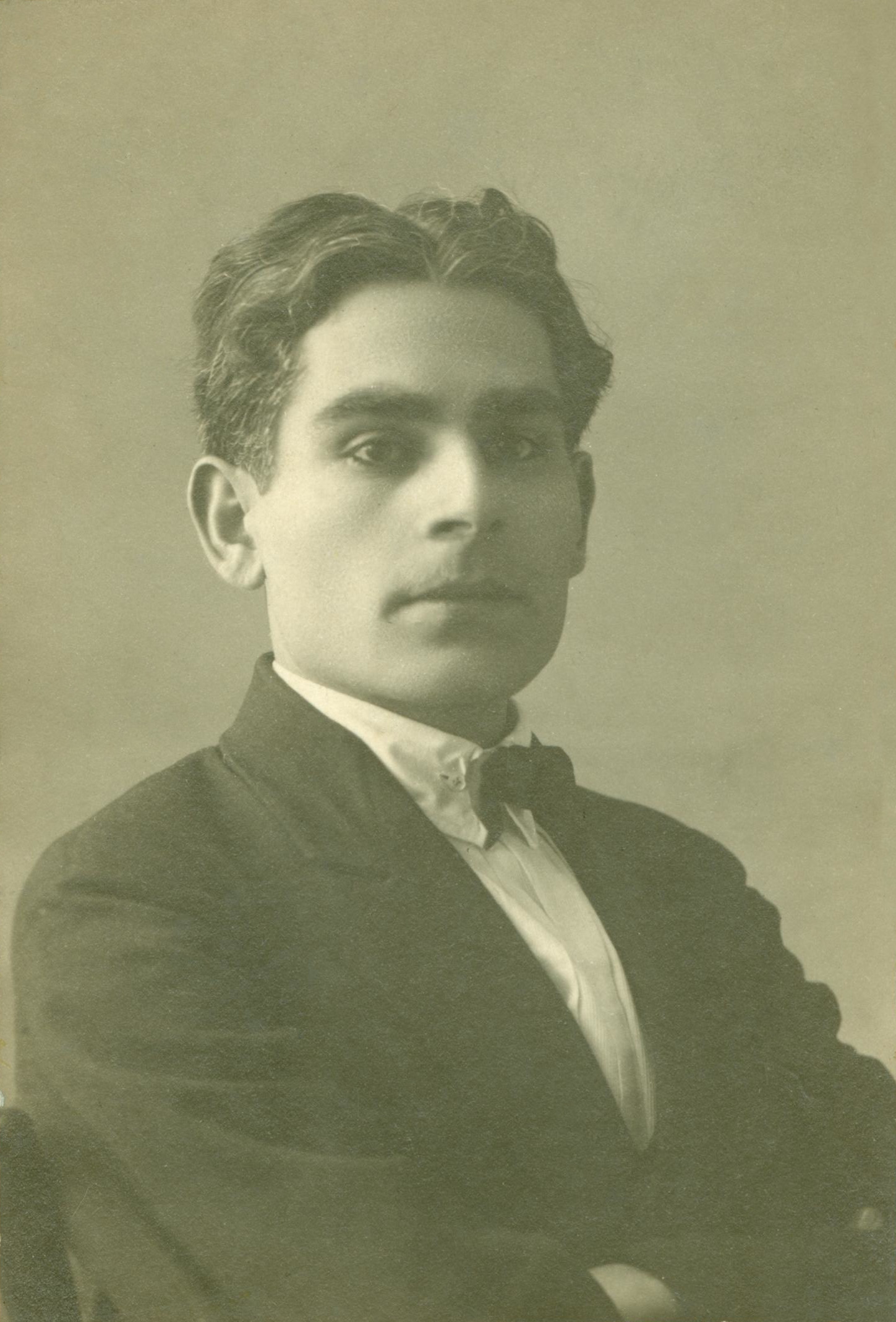
- Born: Vladimir Davidovich Gudiashvili; 30 March 1896; Tiflis, Russian Empire
- Died: 20 July 1980 (aged 84); Tbilisi, Soviet Union
- Education: Tbilisi State Academy of Arts
- Movement: Monumentalism
- Awards: People's Illustrator of the USSR (1972); Hero of Socialist Labour (1976); Shota Rustaveli Prize (1965)

Lado Gudiashvili (Georgian: ლადო გუდიაშვილი; 30 March 1896 – 20 July 1980) was a Georgian painter.

== Life ==
Gudiashvili was born into a family of a railroad employee. He studied in the Tbilisi school of sculpture and fine art (1910–1914), where he met the Armenian artist Alexander Bazhbeuk-Melikyan, and later in Ronson's private academy in Paris (1919–1926). For a while, Gudiashvili belonged to a group of Georgian poets called "The Blue Horns" (1914–1918), who were trying to connect organically the Georgian national flavour with the creative structure of French symbolism. In Paris, he was a constant customer of the famous "La Ruche," a colony of painters where he met Ignacio Zuloaga, Amedeo Modigliani, Natalia Goncharova, and Mikhail Larionov. Gudiashvili's work was greatly influenced by Niko Pirosmani.

Filled with the charm of Georgian life, the painter's early works combine dramatic grotesque with the charm of poetic mystery (Live Fish, 1920, Art Museum of Georgia). Closeness to the traditions of old Caucasian and Persian art was amplified upon his return to Georgia in 1926. Gudiashvili's colours become warmer, and the perception of the world as a theater grew stronger (many of Gudiashvili's paintings were either inspired by operas and balles or serve to depict actresses in costumes). Like his compatriots (Grigol Robakidze, Konstantine Gamsakhurdia), Gudiashvili freely used mythological allegories (The Walk of Seraphita, 1940), the center of which was a graciously beautiful woman imagined as the mysterious "Goddess of the Earth."

Gudiashvili also worked as a monumentalist, painting anew the Kashveti Church in Tbilisi in 1946, for which he was expelled from the Communist Party and fired from the Tbilisi academy of fine arts, where he had been teaching since 1926.

In the voluminous "antifascist cycle" of Indian ink drawings Gudiashvili became a kind of "Georgian Goya": beast-like monsters surrounded the ruins of art and naked "goddesses" conveyed the ideas of the death of culture.

Gudiashvili worked also as a book illustrator, set and theater decorator. He died on 20 July 1980 in Tbilisi.

== Awards ==
He received numerous awards for his work, including the title Hero of Socialist Labour in 1976, the title People's Illustrator of the USSR in 1972, and the Shota Rustaveli Prize in 1965.

== Works ==
- Gudiashvili, Lado (1988). Tainstvo krasoty: Kniga vospominaniy Таинство красоты: Книга воспоминаний [The Sacrament of Beauty: The Book of Memoirs] (in Russian). Tbilisi: Merani.
