= Elizaveta Zvantseva =

Russian painter and art instructor

- Елизавета Званцева
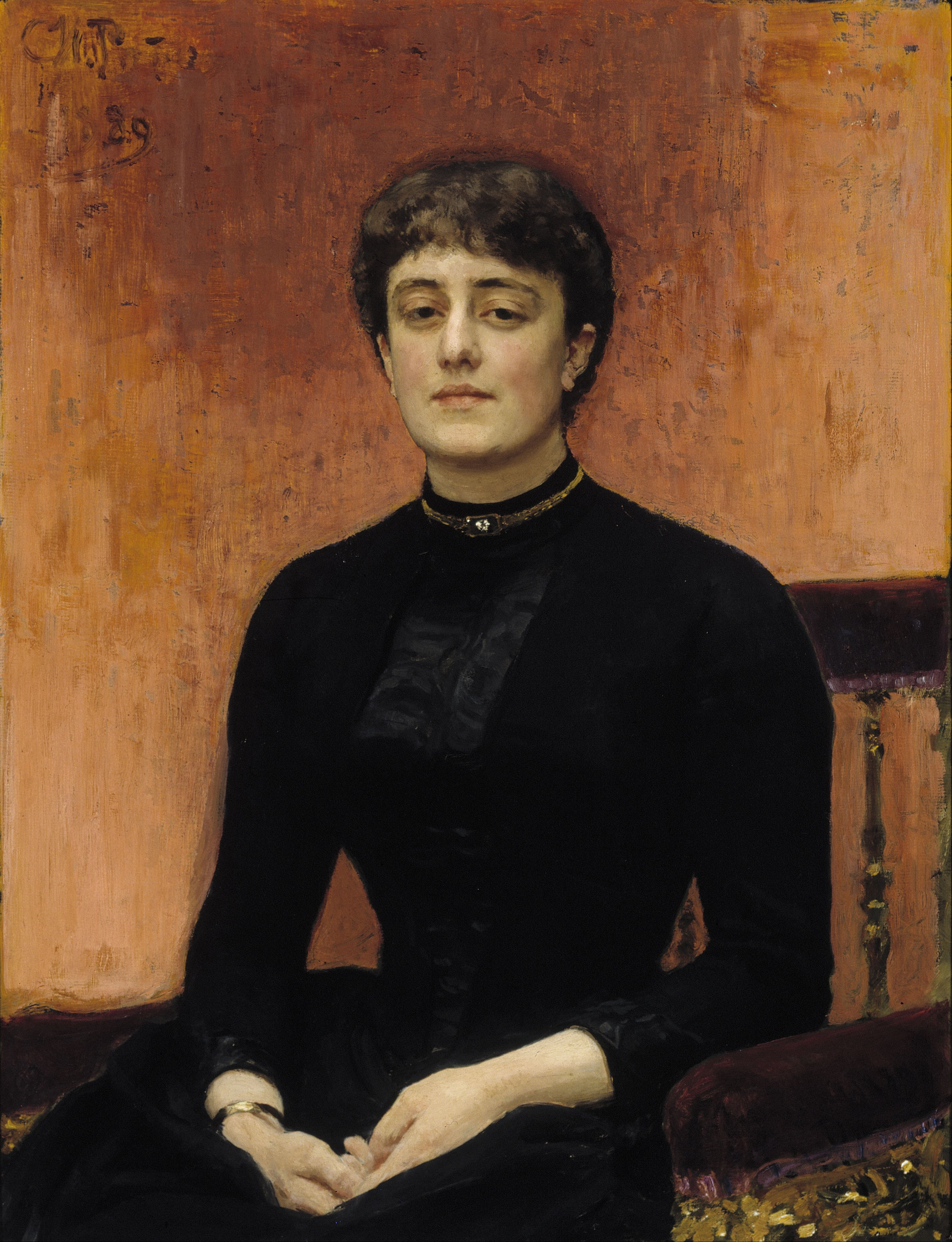
- Portrait of Elizaveta Zvantseva by Ilya Repin
- Born: 30 November 1864 near Nizhny Novgorod, Russia
- Died: 22 August 1921 (aged 56); Moscow, Russia
- Other names: Yelizaveta Zvantseva, Jelisaweta Nikolajewna Swanzewa
- Occupations: Artist; painter; art instructor
- Years active: 1899–1917
- Known for: founding the Zvantseva School of Drawing and Painting

Elizaveta Nikolaevna Zvantseva (Russian: Елизавета Николаевна Званцева; 18 November 1864 OS/30 November 1864 (N. S.)–22 August 1921) was a Russian painter and art instructor who founded "the most progressive art school in pre-1917 Russia". Among alumni of the school were Marc Chagall, Elena Guro, and Margarita Woloschin.

== Early life ==
Elizaveta Nikolaevna Zvantseva was born on 30 November 1864 on her family's estate Tartalee (Russian: Тарталеи) near Nizhny Novgorod on the outskirts of Moscow to Nikolai Zvantsev and his wife, who was the daughter of Nikolai Polevoy. Polevoy, Zvantseva's maternal grandfather was a noted Russian historian and writer. On her paternal side, her great-great grandfather was an Ottoman pasha who had been killed at the battle of Zhvanets in 1769 during the 5th Russo-Turkish War. The pasha's son had been made a ward of Tsar Paul I of Russia and given the name Peter Pavlovich Zhvantsov, which later changed to Zvantsov and then became Zvantsev. In 1796, Paul I gave his ward the estate at Tartalee and his children developed the property, restoring the manor house, creating a luxurious park and building both a summer theater and small school for children. Zvantseva's father was a Collegiate Assessor and though she grew up in privilege, at the age of sixteen, she left home to make her own way.

Zvantseva studied at the Moscow School of Painting, Sculpture and Architecture between 1885 and 1888. For the next several years, until 1896, she studied at the Saint Petersburg Academy of Arts with Ilya Repin and Pavel Chistyakov. During 1889 Repin created five portraits of Zvantseva, one of which was subsequently willed by the artist to the Ateneum in Helsinki. In 1897, she traveled to Paris, with her friend Konstantin Somov, where she studied with Rodolphe Julian at the Académie Julian and with Filippo Colarossi at the Académie Colarossi.

== Career ==
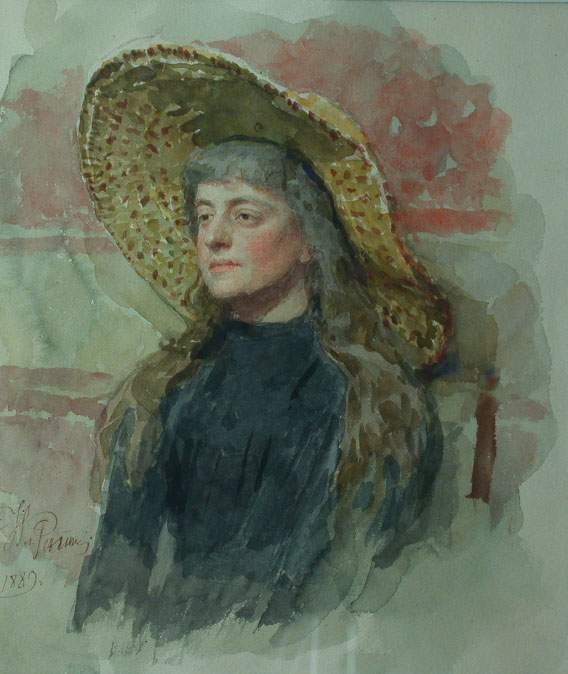
Zvantseva watercolor by Repin

In 1899, Zvantseva returned to Moscow and opened an art school where painters like Konstantin Korovin, Valentin Serov and Nikolai Ulyanov taught students including Nina Simonovich-Efimova who studied there in 1900. She closed the school in Moscow in 1906. That same year, she opened drawing and painting studio in St. Petersburg, known as both the Zvantseva School of Drawing and Painting and The School of Bakst and Dobuzhinsky, until 1910. Léon Bakst taught painting at the school and Mstislav Dobuzhinsky was the drawing instructor. Among their students were Marc Chagall, Sergey Gorodetsky, Elena Guro, Mikhail Matyushin, Heorhiy Narbut, Anna Ostroumova-Lebedeva, Ivan Puni, Olga Rozanova, and Margarita Sabashnikova (later Woloschin).

The school was founded on the fourth floor of a building at No. 25 Tavricheskaia, offered by the Russian poet Vyacheslav Ivanov, who lived on the top floor. The boundaries between apartments and households was blurred, with artists from the school mingling freely with writers who congregated at the Ivanov's space, and conjugal relations extending beyond the marriage bond. The school was a gathering place for the avant-garde and was "the most progressive art school in pre-1917 Russia". Bakst's teaching method focused on teacher and student feeding off of each other's creativity to continually feed intellectual curiosity and push boundaries in new and different ways. He left the school in 1910 and was replaced by Kuzma Petrov-Vodkin and Zvantseva continued to operate the school until April 1917. After the October Revolution, she left Saint Petersburg and returned to Nizhny Novgorod. Some time later, she moved to Moscow where she spent her remaining days running an orphanage for street children.

== Death and legacy ==
Zvantseva died on 22 August 1921 in Moscow.
