= Nina Simonovich-Efimova =

Russian artist and puppeteer

- Нина Симонович-Ефимова
- Simonovich-Efimova in 1930
- Born: Nina Yakovlevna Simonovich; 21 January 1877; Saint Petersburg, Russia
- Died: 24 February 1948 (aged 71); Moscow, Soviet Union
- Other name: Nina Simonovicha
- Occupations: artist, puppeteer
- Years active: 1918–1948
- Known for: creating the foundations of the Russian puppetry genre

Nina Yakovlevna Simonovich-Efimova (Russian: Нина Яковлевна Симонович-Ефимова, 9 January 1877 OS/21 January 1877 N.S. – 24 February 1948) was a Russian artist, puppet designer and one of the first professional Russian puppeteers. Together with her husband Ivan Efimov she founded the tradition of Soviet puppet theater, acting as the driving force behind the Efimovs' presentations.

Born in Saint Petersburg into a family with German-Jewish roots whose professionals included merchants, doctors, composers and academics, Simonovich-Efimova was highly educated, spending almost two decades studying art in both Russia and Paris to perfect her craft. Skilled in etching, watercolor and oil painting, she helped revive silhouette art in 20th-century Russia.

Having performed in parlor theatricals as a child, from 1916 Simonovich-Efimova began staging puppet shows for fellow artists. The plays were so well received that she and her husband were invited to create a children's puppet theater by the Russian authorities in 1918, becoming two of the first professional puppeteers in Russia. She created innovative designs to make her manikins lifelike, promoting her work by publishing books and teaching puppetry theory and design. She and her husband are known as the first couple of Russian puppetry, though she was the one determined to elevate the craft. They performed over 1,500 shows throughout Russia between 1920 and 1940, moving from place to place with their traveling puppet theater.

Inspired by the people she met and the countryside she experienced as they traveled across Russia, Simonovich-Efimova continued to paint throughout her life. While many of her scenes depict landscapes and historic architecture, she was also known for her works of women in traditional costume going about their daily lives. She also created a series of sketches while working at the First Mobile Hospital during World War II. Her works from the "Wounded Warrior" period sought to capture the courageous efforts of the soldiers she tended. Examples of her work are held in major Russian museums.

== Early life ==
Nina Yakovlevna Simonovich was born on 21 January 1877 in Saint Petersburg, Russian Empire, to Adelaida Semyonova (née Bergman) and Yakov Mironovich Simonovich (ru). Her maternal grandparents, Augustina (née Gutsohn) and Semyon Bergman were merchants of German-Jewish heritage, who owned and operated their own mercantile business. Her father was a physician who worked in the typhoid wing of the Aleksandrovskaya Hospital and later at the Elizabeth Children's Hospital in Saint Petersburg. He also helped her mother publish the magazine Detskiy sad (Russian: Детский сад meaning kindergarten). Her mother, denied higher education in her home country, went to Switzerland, where she learned the methods of Friedrich Fröbel before returning to Saint Petersburg where she opened the first kindergarten in Russia in 1866. Her mother's sister, Valentina Serova was Russia's first professional woman composer and her husband, Alexander was also a composer.

Simonovich was one of six siblings. Her parents also helped raise her cousin, Valentin Serov, after his father died and Serov became estranged from his mother, as well as Olga Trubnikova, who would later marry Serov. Olga was the daughter of a former patient of Simonovich's father. The family adopted her in 1879, after her mother's death. Growing up in Saint Petersburg, Simonovich's first studied art under her cousin, Serov, with whom she trained between 1880 and 1890. From early childhood, Simonovich staged parlor theatricals, including shadow puppets in her performances. Between 1888 and 1896, she attended high school at the Gymnasium "M.N. Stoyunina" (Russian: гимназии М. Н. Стоюниной).

== Career training ==
Pavel Florensky, 1926 silhouette by Simonovich-Efimova

Beginning in 1897, Simonovich taught at a boarding school in Tbilisi and gave art classes in a private school run by O.M. Shmerling. She left Tbilisi in 1899 and went to Paris where she studied drawing under Auguste Joseph Delécluse for a year, before returning to Moscow to take private painting courses with Elizaveta Nikolaevna Zvantseva, her cousin Serov, and attend classes at the Stroganov School. Simonvich returned to Paris in 1901 and studied painting with Eugène Carrière through the end of the following year, learning the Impressionist style of masters such as Toulouse-Lautrec and Van Gogh.

Back in Moscow in 1904, Simonovich enrolled in the Moscow School of Painting, Sculpture and Architecture (Russian: Московское училище живописи, ваяния и зодчества (МУЖВЗ)). In 1906, she married fellow student Ivan Efimov, who was studying sculpture. The two continued their art studies at the Moscow School, taking a break between 1909 and 1911 for her to study with Henri Matisse in Paris, pending her graduation in 1911. The couple then traveled back to Paris briefly, before moving in 1912 to Lipetsk where they spent a few months on the Efimov family estate known as "Otradnoe". Her works in the period between 1911 and 1915 were of traditional composition and showed strong use of bold colors, particularly evident in her paintings of Russian peasants.

Between 1910 and 1930, Simonovich-Efimova was a member of the Moscow Association of Artists (ru) (MTX) where she also exhibited her works. She became one of the main participants in the revival of the silhouette art at the start of the twentieth century, and also gained a reputation for etching. She presented silhouettes with restrained detail in theatrical performances similar to shadow plays, using blue cellophane to filter the light, unifying various shapes and adding luster to the overall effect. Some of her silhouettes were portraits, like her depiction of Pavel Florensky in 1926, which aptly captured his image, as well as his personality and dress. Her cousin Serov was a constant mentor to both of the Efimovs. They shared him as a teacher and followed his exacting standards to gain his somewhat rare approval.

== Puppetry ==
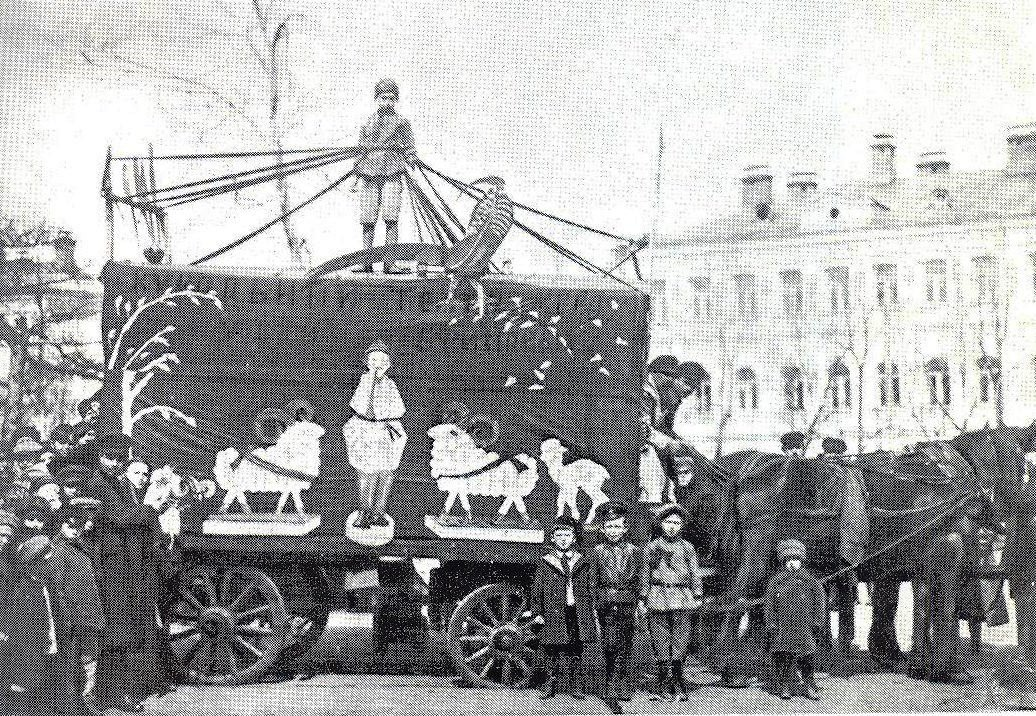
The Efimov Traveling Theater in Moscow, May Day 1919

In 1916, volunteering to stage a puppet show for the MTX members, she created a play with five puppets based loosely on the Petrushka folk character. Petrushka is a roguish character who is often used to comment on contemporary society's social vices. The show was well received. She presented a repeat performance before receiving an invitation to stage the play once more at the Café Pittoresque, a well-known cabaret. Having lost her jester-like puppet, she wrote two new plays and performed them with her husband. They were adaptations of Ivan Krylov's fables The Hermit and the Bear and Two Mice. She gave several other performances with her husband, at cafés, friends' homes and at the Hermitage Theatre between 1916 and 1918.

The events of the October Revolution convinced Simonovich-Efimova that she could no longer paint because easel painting did not serve a "beneficial purpose". Simonovich-Efimova's career turned toward professional puppetry, creating a mobile theater, with the purpose of providing a joyful distraction to the civil war. The Efimovs began traveling and performing as itinerant puppetmasters, visiting venues seldom encountered by traditional theater performers. Giving over seventy shows in Moscow and the surrounding area, they traveled up and down the Kama and Volga Rivers over the summer months, performing their version of Petrushka and of Krylov's fables.

By the fall of 1918, the couple's popularity resulted in their being invited to set up a children's theater in line with the government's socialist restructuring policy. Her husband arranged for the theater in the Mamonovski Passage to be dedicated to puppet productions. By focusing on children's productions, the Efimovs avoided government pressure to perform communist-oriented themes. Simonovich-Efimova developed glove puppets and shadow puppets to re-enact fables and fairy tales based on the works of Krylov and Hans Christian Andersen. They included adaptations of traditional themes such as the Mena stories, Baba Yaga, Shrovetide, and Nikolay Nekrasov's Peasant Children. In a second theater, they staged marionette productions. The Effimovs put on twenty shows per month for the next eight months, while simultaneously performing with their traveling theater. The theater in the Mamonovski Passage then closed, marking their last engagement in a permanent location. For the next six years, the couples' main means of support came from the traveling theater. Between 1916 and 1924, sometimes assisted by their son Adrian, the couple staged around 600 performances. They were able to help people forget the famines and violence of the times. Simonovich-Efimova performed in children's hospitals and mental asylums, contributing to her family's history of philanthropy.

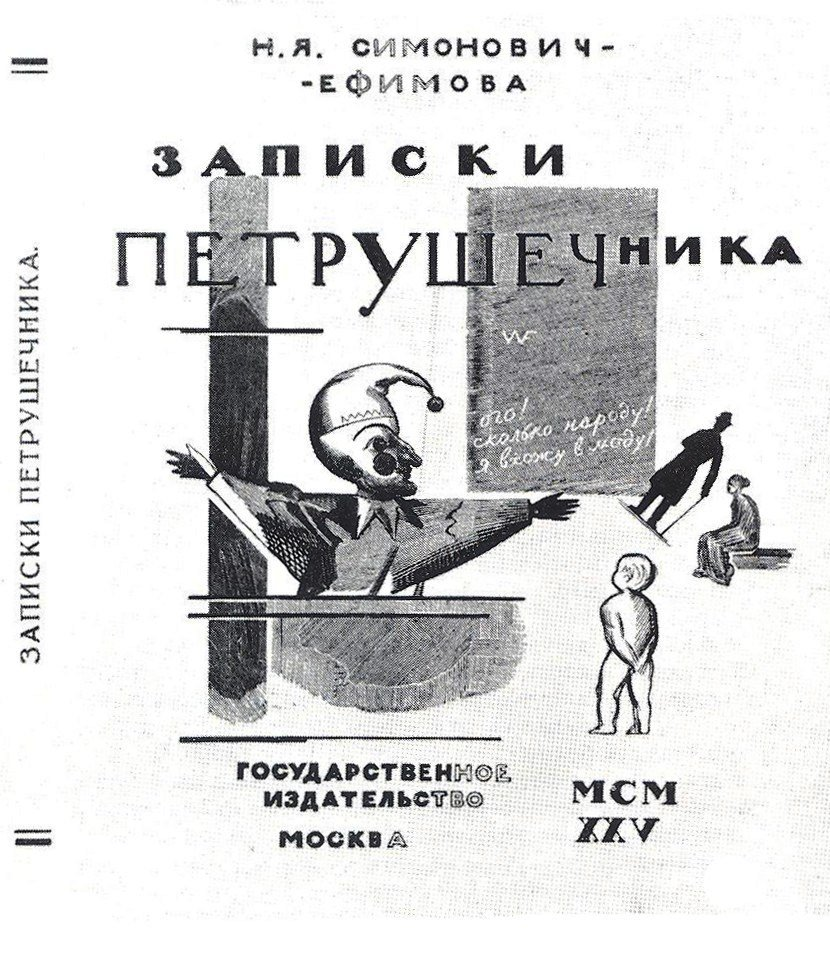
Cover of Notes of a Petrushkanist by Simonovich-Efimova (1925)

Wishing to complement her involvement in performance, Simonovich-Efimova began publishing works "to establish puppetry's validity as a unique discipline" within the visual arts realm. She published books and pamphlets on design and movement, including a history of the art and descriptions of the contributing puppeteers. One of her best known works, Notes of a Petrushkanist (Russian: Записки петрушечника, 1925) gives details of her performances and theories, together with drawings and texts of her plays. In 1930, she spoke at the first USSR Soviet Puppet Theaters Conference presenting her ideas on puppetry. She disavowed claims that puppets are lifeless automatons, maintaining that the puppeteer must convince the audience they are alive. The artistry in creating vitality involved an intimate connection between puppet and puppetmaster, a feat she felt could not be achieved in the same way with marionettes. She viewed the connection between manikin and manipulator as symbiotic collaboration: rather than the puppeteer forcing choreography upon the puppet, the doll's limitations helped the puppeteer learn to communicate in new ways. The lack of facial expressions must be compensated by gesture. Unlike an actor who interacts with other performers, the puppet communicates both with the other actors and the puppetmaster himself.

In 1935, Simonovich-Efimova's Notes was translated and published in English, as The Adventures of a Russian Puppet Theatre, bringing her ideas to international attention. As a result, her theories and techniques became influential in the United States with several university instructors mimicking her techniques for the classroom and at conferences. In 1940, she published additional designs and theories of manikins in Rod Puppets (sometimes translated as Dolls on Canes) (Russian: Куклы на тростях).

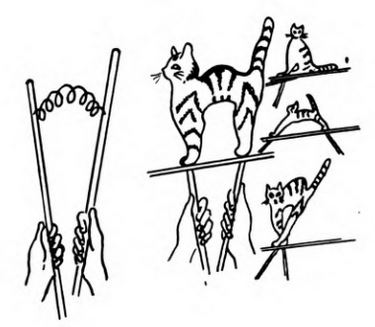
Puppetry design, construction of a cat, by Nina Simonovich-Efimova

Pushing design to the limits, Simonovich-Efimova created puppets to be worn on the head, allowing the puppeteer to manipulate several characters simultaneously. She patented a new type of rod puppet with rods attached to the elbows to free up the hands. The rods were hidden behind hanging costumes. To make puppets look more lifelike, the Efimovs devised a system where the arms were elongated. Rods rather than the puppeteer's fingers were inserted into the glove to manipulate the arms, which were allowed to move by manipulating strings inside the body of the doll. Simonovich-Efimova utilized other apparatus, like springs in the body of a cat puppet to give it the flexibility of a live animal. These innovations allowed their finely formed, elegantly clad puppets to move about naturally, rather than with the stiff, jerky movements of their predecessors. In an era when almost all puppet performances were designed to entertain children or present government ideology, Simonovich-Efimova went out of her way to perform shows for adults, including The Enchanted Pear Tree, Macbeth, and works by Molière and Mikhail Saltykov-Shchedrin. Though she also made adaptations in her work with fables to replace what were seen as outmoded ideas, like replacing serfs with young communist characters, Simonovich-Efimova's focus was on artistry, entertainment and professionalism. She also developed a new system of life-sized manikins, blurring the lines between puppetry and acting, when she danced on stage with her Petrushka. Between 1920 and 1940, the Efimovs performed between 1,500 and 2,000 puppet shows.

== Return to painting ==
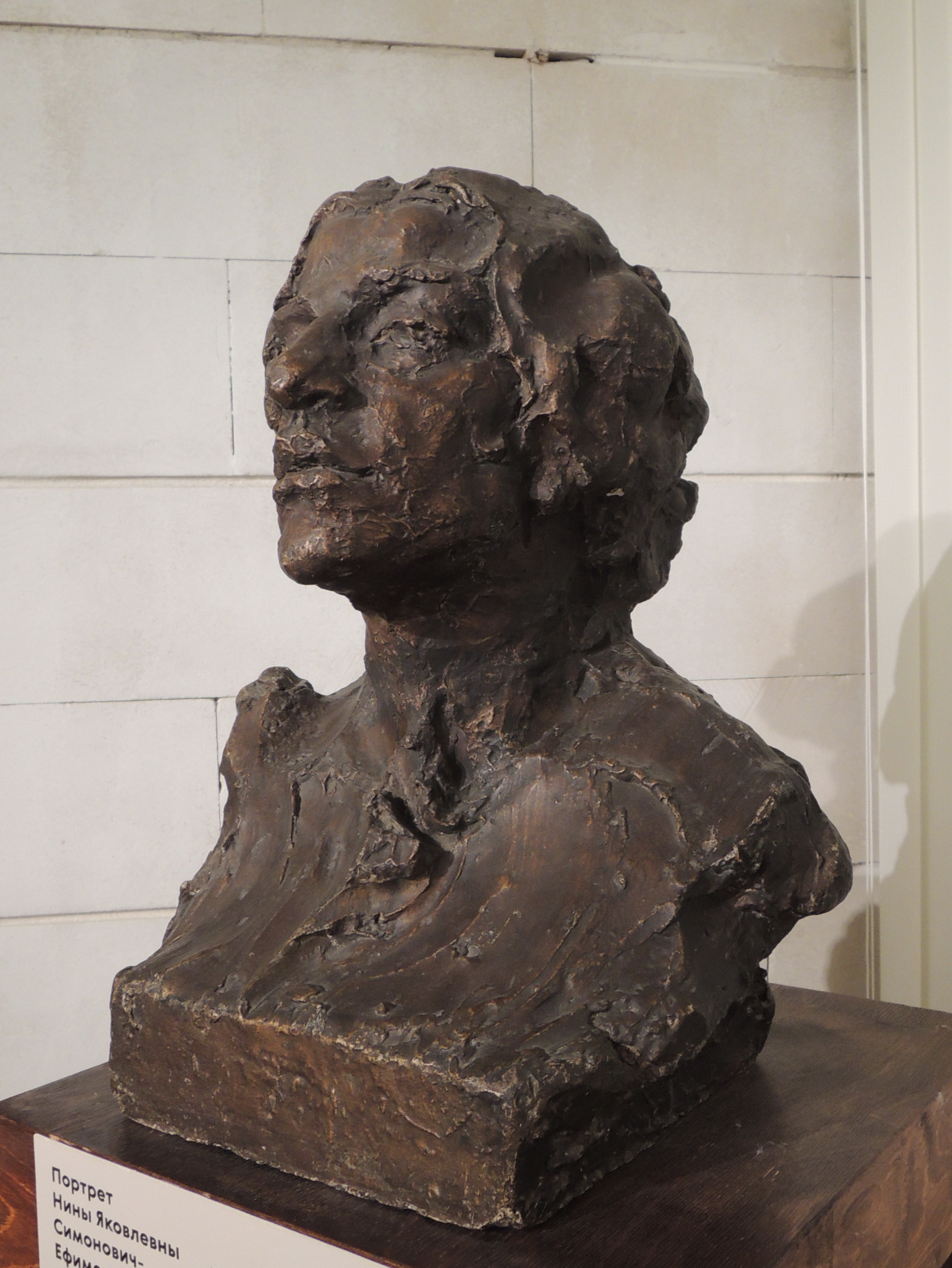
Anna Golubkina. Portrait of Nina Efimova (1907)

As they were traveling with the theater, Simonovich-Efimova's interest in painting rekindled. She was inspired to depict women in their regional dress digging potatoes, comforting their children, or attending fairs and festivals. She painted pictures of women and girls in 1924 and again in 1926 while in Lipetsk; colorful images with reds, greens and ambers in a noted series called "Tambov women"; picturesque scenes from Bashkiria and Udmurtia; and a critically acclaimed series created in Crimea and Novgorod. The Novgorod paintings began in a period when the Effimovs had fled Moscow in 1935 because of political turmoil. During this time, purges of 1933 and the party restructuring that followed in 1935, bureaucrats, corrupt officials, shirkers and those who sought personal gain over state benefit were targeted, rather than previous purges which had focused upon bourgeoisie elements. Even if one were not a target of the purge, a broad range of society was effected, because the purges were aimed at eliminating all those affiliated with a targeted party member. Fear of arrest, denunciation, or extortion, created uncertainty for every strata of society. The paintings from the period comprise mostly landscapes of the area surrounding the city and ancient buildings, where Simonovich-Efimova walked to enjoy the peace of her surroundings.

Beginning in 1928 and continuing until 1942, Simonovich-Efimova taught techniques of shadow theater in courses at the House of Art Education, named after Nadezhda Krupskaya. She also taught at Moscow's Museum for the Protection of Maternity and Infancy, the Union of Theatre Workers of the Russian Federation and the variety theater of the Mosesstrana. In the 1930s, she worked as an interior designer for some of the public buildings of Moscow and created moving silhouette compositions for the Central Museum of Ethnology and the All-Union Agricultural Exhibition (ru) (Russian: Всесоюзная сельскохозяйственная выставка (ВСХВ)). In the mid-1930s Simonovich-Efimova's composition From the Moscow Noble and Merchant to the Moscow Socialist was installed at Gorky Park.

When the World War II broke out in 1941, the Efimovs refused to leave Moscow, though the winter of 1941–1942 was bitterly cold. Simonovich-Efimova worked in the Lefortovo District at the First Mobile Hospital tending to wounded soldiers and writing letters for them to their families and comrades. In a series of drawings called "The Wounded", she drew portraits of the soldiers trying to capture their courage, noting their injuries and their addresses on the backs of the drawings. Some of the drawings she would work up in oil or watercolor, spending most of the daylight hours at the hospital. In the evenings, the couple worked on puppetry, preparing concerts and puppet shows for the troops based on historic and patriotic themes. They also allowed artists to take refuge at their home and work the small garden to supplement their food. They trained and rehearsed their actors daily, though finding male actors was difficult, compounded by gas and electrical shortages. Simonovich-Efimova also compiled a memoir of her cousin and teacher Valentin Serov, though her book, Memories of V. A. Serov (Russian: Воспоминания о В. А. Серове) was not published until 1964.

== Death and legacy ==
Simonovich-Efimova died on 24 February 1948 in Moscow, Soviet Union. Posthumously, she was inducted into the International Academy of Puppeteers for her innovations in life-sized puppets. The couple are known as the Adam and Eve of Russian puppetry. She left a large legacy, including around 3,000 works, some of which are housed in a memorial workshop at their former home, though art historians mostly ignored her work until the end of the 20th century. Her works can be seen in the permanent collections of the Russian Museum, Tretyakov Gallery, the Tver Regional Art Gallery, among others. There have been posthumous solo exhibitions of her work in 1959, 1968 and 1975. In 2011, The Museum of Russian Art (TMORA) in Minneapolis, Minnesota included some of her ethnic paintings of women in their native dress. The following year, her 1935 book, Adventures of a Russian Puppet Theatre: Including Its Discoveries in Making and Performing with Hand-Puppets, Rod-Puppets and Shadow-Figures (English version) was reprinted by Martino Publishing. The Efimova crater on Venus is named after Simonovich-Efimova.
