= Ivan Efimov =

Russian sculptor

- Born: Иван Семёнович Ефимов; 11 February 1878; Moscow, Russia
- Died: 7 January 1959 (aged 80); Moscow, USSR
- Occupations: sculptor, puppeteer
- Years active: 1918-1958
- Known for: animal sculptures

Ivan Semyonovich Efimov (Russian: Иван Семёнович Ефимов 11 February 1878 – 7 January 1959) was a Russian sculptor. He was one of the members of the art association ‘The Four Arts’, which existed in Moscow and Leningrad in 1924-1931. Along with his wife, Nina Simonovich-Efimova, the couple founded the tradition of Soviet puppet theater. Since 1958 he has been an Honorary member of UNIMA (International Puppetry Association). In addition to puppet design, Efimov was noted for his book illustration and sculpture. He created pieces for the Central Museum of Ethnology, the North River Terminal, several metro and railway stations and the Grand Kremlin Palace. Internationally his sculptures were awarded gold medals in 1937 at the Paris World Exhibition and a silver medal at the World Exhibition in Brussels, and in Russia he was honored as both an Artist of the Russian Soviet Federative Socialist Republic (RSFSR) and the People’s Artist of the RSFSR.

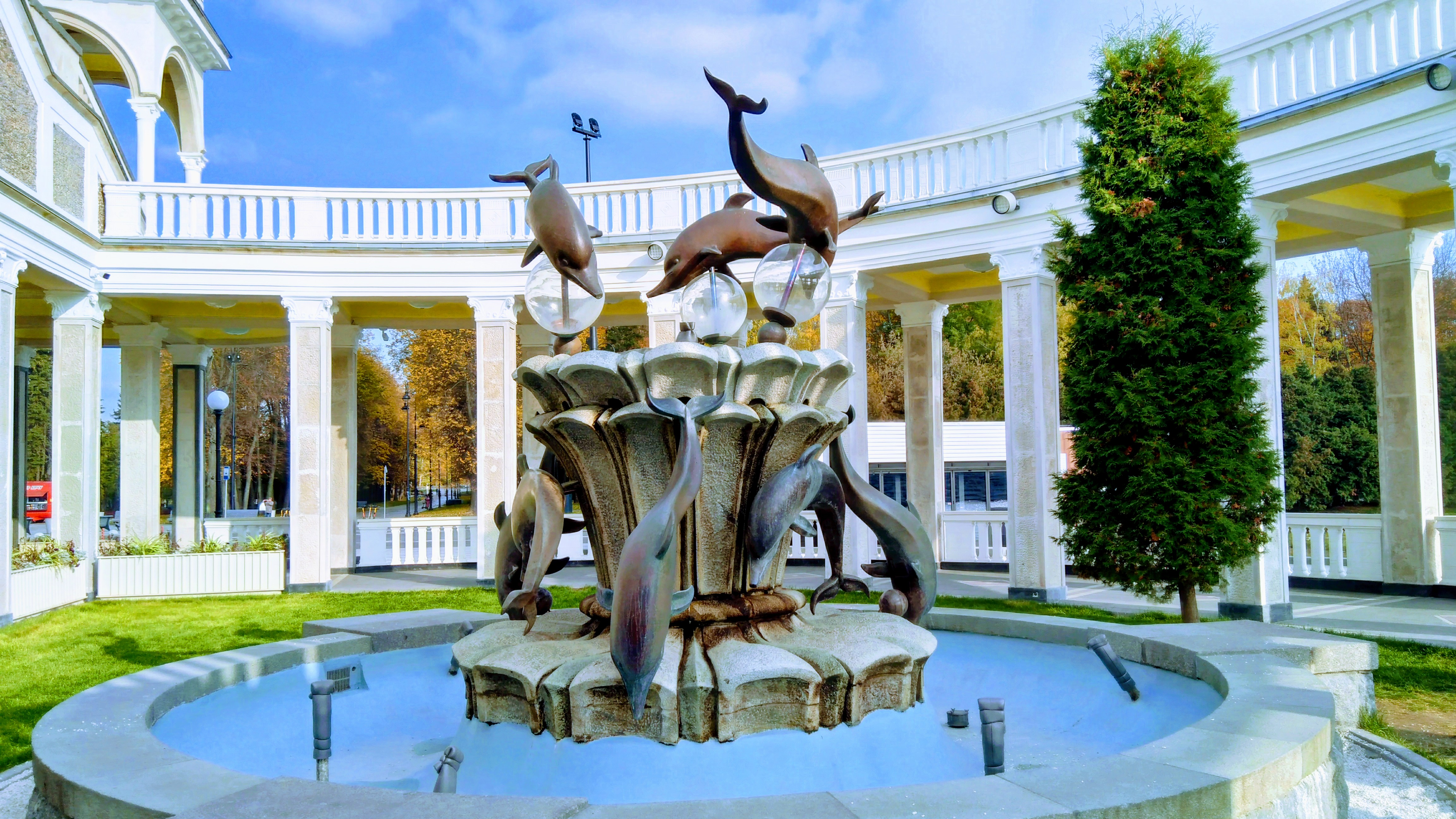
Ivan Efimov — Fountain "Dolphins" in Moscow (Russia), 1937

== Early life ==
Ivan Semyonovich Efimov was born on 11 February 1878 in Moscow. His father, Semyon Grigorievich Efimov, was a government official and the illegitimate son of a Ukrainian peasant woman. His mother descended from the Demidov family of whom the forebear, Nikita Demidov, a blacksmith from Tula, pioneered the production of iron ore in the Ural Mountains. Efimov grew up in an aristocratic milieu in the Tambov province on an estate known as "Otradnoe", to which later he would take his young bride. At a young age, he was sent to a military school, which had a profound effect on him. He felt imprisoned and cut off from nature, which led to his creating handcrafted toy animals.

In 1896, Efimov completed his studies at the Polivanov Gymnasium, which had been founded by Lev I. Polivanov, and then took private art lessons with Nikolai A. Martynov for two years. Between 1898 and 1901, he studied natural science at Moscow University, simultaneously taking painting courses under Valentin Serov and sculpture classes with Anna Golubkina at the art school founded by Elizaveta Nikolaevna Zvantseva. Between 1905 and 1908 he worked in Abramtsevo Colony in the ceramic workshop of Savva Mamontov creating toys, while continuing his studies at the Moscow School of Painting, Sculpture and Architecture (Russian: Московское училище живописи, ваяния и зодчества (МУЖВЗ)) with Serov, and studying sculpture with Sergei Volnukhin. In April 1906, he married fellow student and Serov's cousin, Nina Yakovlevna Simonovicha and in 1909 the couple took a break from their studies at the Moscow School and went to Paris.

Between 1909 and 1911, Efimov worked in the studio of Antoine Bourdelle and beginning in 1910 studied sculpture with Filippo Colarossi and mastered the art of etching under the direction of Elizaveta Kruglikova. He joined the circle of Russian artists working in Montparnasse and took inspiration from nature at the Paris Menagerie. In 1911, the couple briefly returned to Moscow, where Simonovich-Efimova completed her studies at the Moscow School before they moved to Lipetsk in 1912, spending several months on the Efimov family estate. By the end of the year, they were back in Moscow and Efimov had returned to his studies at the Moscow School. He graduated with the title of sculptor in 1913 with his presentation pieces, Bison and Passion and almost immediately went into service in World War I.

== Career ==
After the October Revolution, Efimov was hired to teach at the Second State Free Art Studio in 1918, continuing his affiliation with the school when it was replaced by the Higher Art and Technical Studios until 1930. In 1918, he joined his wife in organizing a puppet theater in Moscow and together with her created puppets, costumes and scenery for their mobile theater, which operated until 1943. Some of his most known works were for their productions of Hans Christian Andersen's The Princess and the Pea (1918) and Shakespeare's Macbeth (1921). They created the first professional puppet theater in Russia and utilized innovative techniques with rods. The pair also worked in shadow theaters using the art of silhouettes.

For his own sculptures, Efimov preferred to depict the essence of animals. He was not interested in their portraiture, but rather in capturing the typical characteristics of his subject. He also rejected traditional media like marble and stone, preferring to work with cement, clay, glass, metal or wood, which placed his works in the folk art tradition. He tried to capture the natural movement as well as characteristics. His sculptures "Ostrich" (1935) forged from copper with spiraling copper plumes and "Ram" (1938) made with loose curls of copper wire crowned by tightly spiraled wire horns, exemplify his works. Placing them in habitat was also important for Efimov, employing various techniques, as in his copper sculpture "Fish". The fish is attached via a wire to a copper sheet in the shape of a water lily, which in turn is perched on a three-dimensional piece of glass, representing water.

Efimov also worked on book illustrations, in such works as The Cat, the Goat and the Ram (Russian: Кот, козел да баран, 1924), Aesop's Fables (Russian: Басни Эзоп, 1925), How the Animal Cart Awoke (Russian: Как машина зверей всполошила, 1927), Mena (Russian: Мена, 1929) and Mordovian epic (Russian: Мордовский эпос, 1930). In the early 1930s, he participated in anthropological studies of Bashkiria and Udmurtia for the Central Museum of Ethnology (Russian: Центральный музей народоведения), which in the early 1930s was located at the Mamonov dacha adjacent to the Vorobiev Palace. Thereafter, Efimov worked from 1932 to 1933 to create an installation, "History of Russia in Mannequins" for the same museum. Between 1935 and 1937, he sculpted a fountain, "Dolphins" for the North River Terminal and between 1936 and 1937 created the sculpture "Old and New Moscow" for Gorky Central Park of Culture and Leisure. In 1937 two of his sculptures, "Fisherman with Fish" and "Bull" received the gold medal at the World Exhibition in Paris.

Efimov designed reliefs for two of the Moscow metro stations, Paveletskaya and Avtozavodskaya (1942-1943); two of the Moscow railway stations, Yaroslavl (1946-1947) and Leningrad (1948); and for the winter garden at the Grand Kremlin Palace (1952). In 1955 he was designated as an Honored Artist of the Russian Soviet Federative Socialist Republic and three years later, in 1958, Efimov was honored as the People’s Artist of the RSFSR.

== Death and legacy ==
Efimov died on 7 January 1959 in Moscow. He has works in the permanent collections of the Pushkin Museum, the State Museum of Ceramics at the "XVIII Century Manor of Kuskovo", the State Russian Museum, the State Tretyakov Gallery and the Italian Museum in Trieste. Posthumous exhibitions of his work were held in Moscow and Leningrad between 1959 and 1960, in Moscow in 1970, and in Kaluga, Obninsk, and Moscow in 1975.
