= Totibadze =

Totibadze is a Georgian surname. It may refer to

- Georgy Konstantinovich Totibadze, Georgian painter (1928-2010)
- Georgy Georgevich Totibadze, Georgian and Russian painter (1967-present)
- Konstantin Totibadze, Georgian and Russian painter (1969-present), brother of Georgy Georgevich Totibadze
