= Tiziana Terranova =

Italian theorist and activist

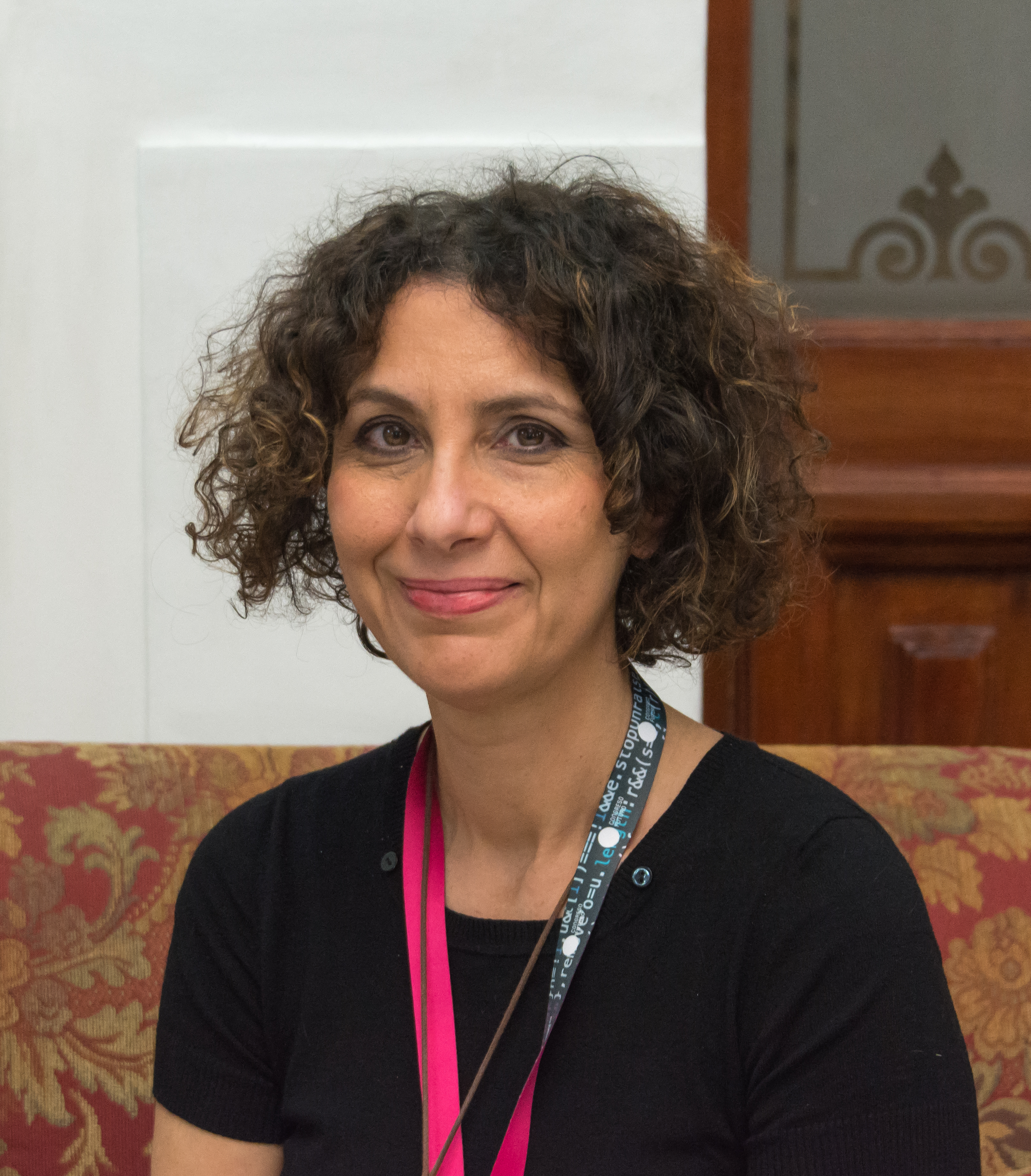
- Born: Trapani, Italy
- Occupations: Theorist, activist, faculty of the University of Naples

Tiziana Terranova (Trapani-Sicily, 1967) is an Italian theorist and activist whose work focuses on the effects of information technology on society through concepts such as digital labor and commons. Terranova has published the monograph Network Culture. Politics for the Information Age, as well as a more extensive number of essays and speeches, and appeared as a keynote speaker in several conferences. She lectures on the digital media cultures and politics in the Department of Human and Social Sciences, at the University of Naples, 'L'Orientale'.

== Theories ==
Perhaps the best known part of Terranova's work is her thesis, formulated in the early 2000s, that the free labor of users is the source of economic value in the digital economy. Free labor as a concept is rooted in Italian post-workerist and autonomist labor theories of value, such as Paolo Virno's re-reading of Marx's notion of the general intellect, Antonio Negri's theory of the social factory, and Maurizio Lazzarato's concept of immaterial labor. Free labor is free both in the sense that the laborers provide it voluntarily and in the sense that they are not remunerated by the beneficiaries of the labor (such as social media companies). As such, free labor is only the most extreme form of social labor receiving very little or no monetary compensation. For instance, Terranova describes the university as a 'diffuse factory': 'an open system opening onto the larger field of casualised and underpaid 'socialised labour power'.' She has argued against Benjamin H. Bratton's concept of the stack as a model of planetary computation. Terranova has also argued that non-hierarchical, open access, free association, and non-monetary P2P networks may provide a post-capitalist social and economic infrastructure.

== Bibliography (selected) ==
=== Books ===
- Network Culture. Politics for the Information Age – Pluto Press, London, 2004.
- After the Internet: Digital Networks between the Capital and the Common – Semiotext(e), Los Angeles, 2022. (Italian edition: Dopo Internet. Le reti digitali tra capitale e comune, NERO, Roma, 2024.)

=== Essays and speeches ===
- Free Labor: Producing Culture for the Digital Economy – Summer 2000.
- Failure to comply. Bioart, security and the market – Transversal, June 2007.
- Netwar 2.0: the convergence of streets and networks – Le Monde diplomatique, March 2012.
- Attention, Economy and the Brain – Culture Machine, Vol 13 (2012).
- Red Stack Attack – Effimera, February 2014.
- Keynote: Capture All Work – 29 January 2015.

== See also ==
- Antonio Negri
- Paolo Virno
- Franco Berardi
- Post-Marxism
