= No Pay, Nudity =

2016 American comedy drama film by Lee Wilkof

- Directed by: Lee Wilkof
- Written by: Ethan Sandler
- Produced by: Tani L. Cohen
- Starring: Gabriel Byrne; Frances Conroy; Donna Murphy; Nathan Lane
- Cinematography: Brian Lannin
- Edited by: Sylvia Waliga
- Music by: Craig Richey
- Production companies: A Day in the Life Films; Waistband Pictures
- Distributed by: Monterey Media
- Release date: November 2016
- Running time: 92 minutes
- Country: United States
- Language: English

No Pay, Nudity is a 2016 American comedy drama film starring Gabriel Byrne, Frances Conroy, and Nathan Lane.

== Cast ==
- Gabriel Byrne as Lawrence Rose
- Frances Conroy as Andrea
- Donna Murphy as Pearl
- Nathan Lane as Herschel
- Valerie Mahaffey as Lisa
- J. Smith-Cameron as Debra
- Ellen Foley as Tani Marshall
- Ethan Sandler as Atash
- Boyd Gaines as Stephan
- Zoe Perry as Renie

== Reception ==
The film has a 71% rating on Rotten Tomatoes based on 7 reviews.
