= Konstantin Totibadze =

Georgian-Russian painter and illustrator of Georgian origin

Konstantin G. Totibadze
- კონსტანტინე თოთიბაძე
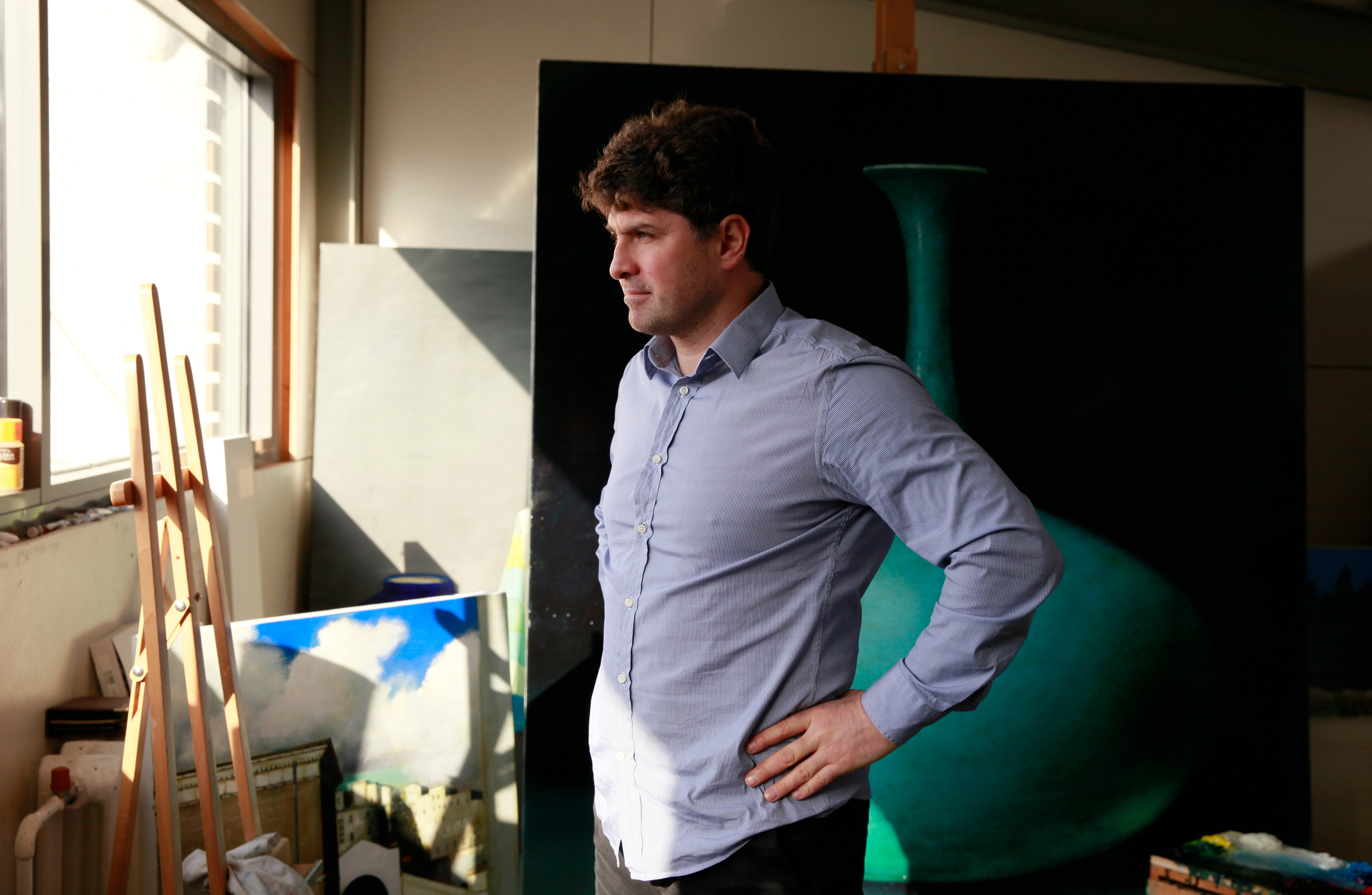
- Konstantin Totibadze in his workshop
- Born: Konstantin Goergevich Totibadze; 8 September 1969 (age 56); Tbilisi, Georgia
- Education: Tbilisi State Academy of Arts
- Known for: Still life paintings
- Style: Neo-classical

Konstantin Georgevich Totibadze (in Georgian: კონსტანტინე გიორგის ძე თოთიბაძე), also known as Kostya Totibadze, is a Russian painter of Georgian origin and illustrator born on 8 September 1969 in Tbilisi.

== Biography ==
=== Youth ===
Konstantin Totibadze was born on 8 September 1969 in Tbilisi. Konstantin inherits the passion for art of his grandfather, Apollon Kutateladze (after whom the Tbilisi State Academy of Arts was named) and of his own father, Georgy Konstantinovich Totibadze, who was rector of the Academy during 10 years (1972-1982).

Konstantin lived in Tbilisi at 11 Zandukeli Street (formerly called Djavakhishvili Street) in the paternal home until the divorce of his parents in 1977. He moves to his grandfather Apollon Kutateladze's artist workshop in Moscow at 9 Verkhnyaya Maslovka Street, in the Moscow City of Artists with his mother Nana Kutateladze, his brother Georgy and his sister Maria Totibadze.

His neighbours were painters Alexander Tyshler and Sergey Luppov. His first art teacher will be Dmitry Ivanovich Khamin.

Since his childhood. Konstantin practises Shitō-ryū, a variant of Karate. He will thus come first at the Russian cahmpoinships thrice and he will receive a bronze medal at the World Karate championships. His teachers were V. Eidlin, Mabuni Kenei and Hidetoshi Nakahashi.

=== Education and career ===
In 1985, Konstantin enters the Moscow 1905 Academy of Arts. In 1988, Konstantin Totibadze continues studying arts in Tbilisi at the Nikoladze Academy of Arts. From 1989 to 1991, he studies in the workshop of Georgi Aleksi-Meskhishvili, Parnaose Lapishvili and his father Georgy Konstantinovich Totibadze. During this period, Konstantin created a series of paintings in a lyrical and expressive way. In 1992, Konstantin marries Olga Nikolaevna Chestirikova. From 1994 to 1995, Konstantin lives in Paris and creates still life paintings with success. In 1996, Konstantin prepares a series of paintings which will later be purchased by members of the Japanese Diaspora with his brother. During a short period of two years (1997-1998), Konstantin lives in San Francisco. In 2000, Konstantin Totibadze will create a new series of still life paintings, in which his Neo-classical style contrasts with the irony of the chosen subjects. Since 2007, Konstantin Totibadze works and produces artworks in his workshop in the Strelka Institute.

On 26 January 2016, Georgy and Konstantin Totibadze inaugurated the Totibadze Art gallery in the Moscow Contemporary Art Center Winzavod with Marina Tsurtsumia (Russian screenwriter and Film maker) and Georgi Tasker.^{,} Since, the gallery has been exhibiting the works of several artists such as Alena Kirtsova, Olga and Alexander Florenski, Alexander Zakharov, Ruben Monakhov, Sergey Zuev, Muriel Rousseau and Andrey Sarabianov.

Konstantin participates to charity actions to raise funds for orphanages in 2008, to help young rough sleepers in Moscow in 2009 as part of the SAMU Social in Moscow, and has given some of his works to be sold to help flood victims in Georgia in 2015.

== Collections ==
Konstantin's works are present in several art museums and galleries such as the Moscow Museum of Modern Art and the State Museum of Oriental Art.

== See also ==
=== Bibliography ===
- Georgy Georgevich Totibadze; Konstantin Totibadze. Landscape (in Russian). Moscow Museum of Modern Art. ISBN 978-5-9904069-2-6. Wikidata Q50218810.
- Totibadze, Konstantin Konstantinovich; Totibadze, Georgy Georgevich (2008). Грузия Первое Второе Третье [Georgia: Starter, Main course, Dessert] (in Russian). Translated by Gomiashili, Nina. Moscow: Afisha Industries. ISBN 978-5-91151-052-7.
- Totibadze, Konstantin Konstantinovich; Totibadze, Georgy Georgevich (2009). Painting (in Russian). Moscow: Atlas Gallery.
- Totibadze, Konstantin Konstantinovich; Totibadze, Georgy Georgevich; Gomiashili, Nina; Cervetti, Marco (2004). Gurmaniada. Italy Гурманиада. Италия (in Russian). Moscow: Независимая Газета. ISBN 5-86712-141- 0.

=== External links ===
- Auction selling of Konstantin's works at Phillips
