= Georgy Georgevich Totibadze =

Russian and Georgian painter and illustrator

Georgy Totibadze
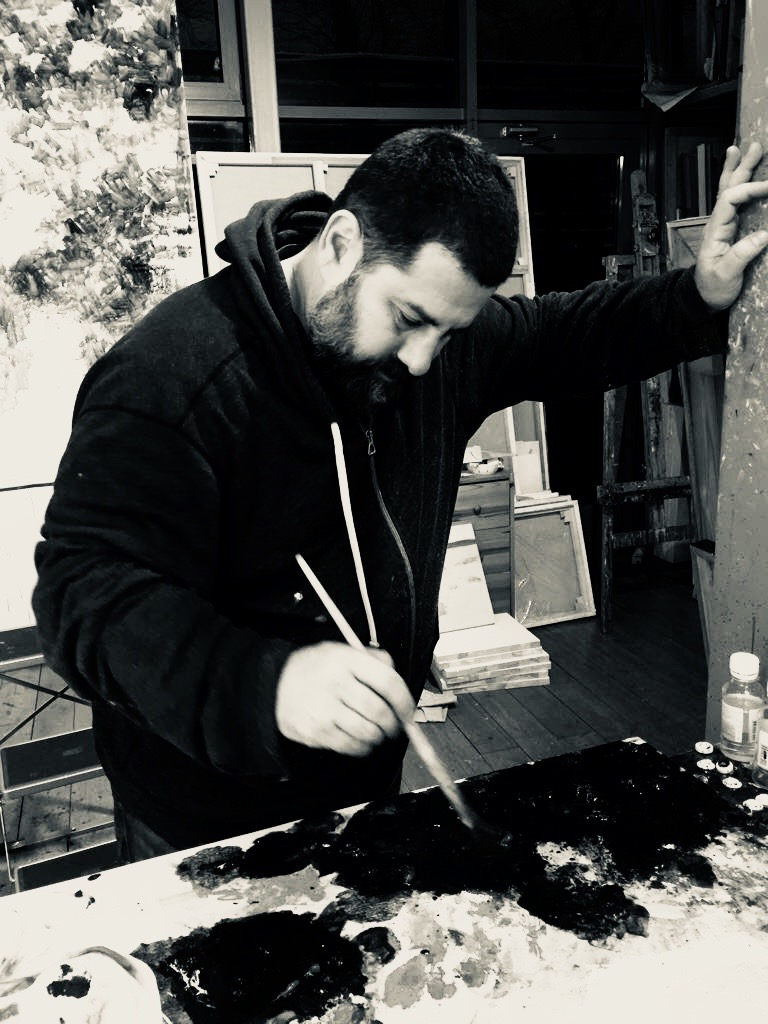
- Georgy Totibadze in his artist workshop
- Born: August 28, 1967 (age 59); Tbilisi, Georgia
- Education: Tbilisi State Academy of Arts; Moscow 1905 Academy of Arts
- Known for: painting
- Spouse: Irina Savelievna Kozlova
- Website: gogitotibadze.com

Georgy Georgevich Totibadze (in Georgian: გოგი გიორგის ძე თოთიბაძე, born on August 28, 1967 in Tbilisi), also known as Gogi Totibadze, is a Russian and Georgian painter and illustrator.

== Personal situation ==
=== Early life ===
Georgy Totibadze was born in Tbilisi on August 28, 1967^{,}. His father, Georgy Konstantinovich Totibadze was a painter and was the rector of the Tbilisi State Academy of Arts, which bears to this day the name of his grandfather, Apollon Kutateladze.

He spent the first years of his life with his parents, his brother Konstantin and his sister Maria in Tbilisi, at 11 Zandukeli Street (formerly Djavakhishvili Street).

Since his childhood, Gogi creates historical battlefield paintings, inspired from extracts of the Greek mythology. In 1977, Gogi moves to Moscow after the divorce of his parents in the City of Artists with his mother Nana Kutateladze.

=== Family ===
Georgy Totibadze marries Irina Savelievna Kozlova, also a painter. Their children are Nana, Manana and Varvara Totibadze.

His brother Konstantin as well as his uncles, Guram Apollonovich Kutateladze and Karaman Apollonovich Totibadze are painters. His nephew Anton Totibadze is a painter, illustrator and designer and Gogi's sister, Maria Totibadze, is a fashion stylist and his niece, Musia Totibadze, is a singer and actress.

== Biography ==
=== Art ===
==== Education ====
When moving in Moscow, Georgy Totibadze shared his grandfather Apollon Kutateladze's workshop with the rest of his mother's family, until 1983. His neighbours were Alexander Tyshler, symbolist illustrator and painter, and Dmitry Ivanovich Khamin, who became Gogi's first painting and drawing personal teacher.

In 1982, Totibadze integrates the Moscow 1905 State Academy of Arts in the "scenography" department. Whilst he studies, he meets his future wife Irina Savelievna Kozlova, painter and illustrator. Georgy obtains his diploma in 1986. He enters the Tbilisi State Academy of Arts with art teacher Georgy Aleksi-Meskhishvili, followed by Georgy's own father, Georgy Konstantinovich Totibadze. Georgy Georgevich stayed in his father's workshop from 1986 to 1991.

==== Career ====
From 1993 until 1994, Georgy Totibadze lives and works in Paris, where his painting style becomes more lyric. He creates a series of portraits during this period.

Georgy Totibadze created a series of paintings in Hong Kong, later bought by members of the Japanese diaspora in 1996.

From 1997 to 1998, he moves to San Francisco, where he mostly created a series of paintings of landscapes.

From 2000 onwards, the painter mostly compose aerial views of urban and rural landscapes.

Since 2007, Georgy Totibadze works and produces artworks in his workshop in the Strelka Institute.

On 26 January 2016, Georgy and Konstantin Totibadze inaugurated and opened the Totibadze Art gallery in the Moscow Contemporary Art Center Winzavod with Marina Tsurtsumia (Russian screenwriter and Film maker) and Georgi Tasker.^{,} Since, the gallery has been exhibiting the works of several artists such as Alena Kirtsova, Olga and Alexander Florenski, Alexander Zakharov, Ruben Monakhov, Sergey Zuev, Muriel Rousseau and Andrey Sarabianov.

Georgy Totibadze has proposed a project for the Moscow Biennale in 2017.

Georgy participates to charity actions to raise funds for orphanages in 2008, to help young rough sleepers in Moscow in 2009 as part of the SAMU Social in Moscow, and has given some of his works to be sold to help flood victims in Georgia in 2015.

=== Karate ===
Aged 11, Georgy Totibadze begins to practise Shitō-ryū.

His teachers were Eydlin, Mabuni Kenei and Hidetoshi Nakahashi. He wins 5 silver medals at the Russia Championships, one silver medal at the Japan championships and two bronze medals at the world Shitō-ryū championships. His fondness for Asiatic cultures is reflected in his works.

== Exhibitions ==
- 1989: "Styx", Moscow, Russia
- 1990: "Hosp" Gallery, Innsbruck, Austria
- 1992: "Moi, Gogi und anderen", Central House of Artists, Moscow, Russia
- 1993: Private exhibition, Central House of Artists, Moscow, Russia
- 1994: Private exhibition, « The Thursday event », Paris, France
- 1995: "Russian painters' exhibition", UNESCO, Paris, France
- 1996: "From Gallery to Gallery", Tretiakov Gallery, Moscow, Russia
- 1996: "A Midsummer night's dream", National Museum for Oriental Arts, Moscow
- 1996: Exposition personnelle, Galerie L. Bruck, Central House of Artists, Moscow, Russia
- 1997: "Art Manezh", Moscow, Russia
- 1998: "Russian painters' exhibitions", Diana Gallery, Washington DC, USA
- 1998: "Art Salon", Central House of Artists, Moscow, Russia
- 2000: "Art Manezh", Moscow, Russia
- 2001: Private exhibition, King Gallery, Berkeley, CA, USA
- 2002: "Art Manezh", Moscow, Russia
- 2003: "Art Manezh", Moscow, Russia
- 2004: "Art Manezh", Moscow, Russia
- 2004: "Art Party", Yakut Gallery, Moscow, Russia
- 2005: "Baroque Party", Yakut Gallery, Moscow, Russia
- 2005: "Gurmaniada", Art Play, Moscow, Russia
- 2006: "Art Manezh", Moscow, Russia
- 2006: "Art Moscow", VP Studio, Moscow, Russia
- 2006: Private exhibition, VP Studio, Moscow, Russia
- 2007: Personal exhibition "Heavenly garden", VP Studio, Moscow, Russia
- 2008: "Art Manezh", Moscow, Russia
- 2009: Private exhibition, Atlas Art Gallery, Moscow, Russia
- 2010: "Painting", Mosfilm Gallery, Moscow
- 2012: "Landscape" Moscow Museum of Modern Art, Moscow, Russia
- 2015: "Ode to food", Proun gallery Moscow
- 2016: Space 7, Totibadze Gallery, Moscow
- 2017: "Under the cover of the forest", Totibadze Gallery, Moscow Biennale
- 2018: "Tbilisi Art Fair", Tbilisi, Georgia

== Public collections ==
Georgy Totibadze's works are exhibited at several art galleries of which the Totibadze gallery, the Moscow Museum of Modern Art and the State Museum of Oriental Art.

== Filmography ==
He has been part of the cast for the film Russia 88 by Pavel Bardin.

== See also ==
=== Bibliography ===
- Georgy Georgevich Totibadze; Konstantin Totibadze. Landscape (in Russian). Moscow Museum of Modern Art. ISBN 978-5-9904069-2-6. Wikidata Q50218810.
- Totibadze, Georgy Konstantinovich; Totibadze, Konstantin Georgevich (2008). Грузия Первое Второе Третье [Georgia: Starter, Main course, Dessert] (in Russian). Translated by Gomiashili, Nina. Moscow: Afisha Industries. ISBN 978-5-91151-052-7.
- Totibadze, Georgy Konstantinovich; Totibadze, Konstantin Georgevich (2009). Painting (in Russian). Moscow: Atlas Gallery.
- Totibadze, Georgy Konstantinovich; Totibadze, Konstantin Georgevich; Gomiashili, Nina; Cervetti, Marco (2004). Gurmaniada. Italy Гурманиада. Италия (in Russian). Moscow: Независимая Газета. ISBN 5-86712-141- 0.

=== External links ===
- Official website
- Auction selling of Totibadze's works at Phillips
- Auction selling of Totibadze's works at Sotheby's
- Auction selling of Totibadze's works at Christie's
