= Inside Monkey Zetterland =

- Directed by: Jefery Levy
- Written by: Steve Antin; John Boskovich
- Produced by: Steve Antin; Tani Cohen; Chuck Grieve; Greta Von Steinbauer
- Starring: Steve Antin; Patricia Arquette; Sandra Bernhard; Sofia Coppola; Tate Donovan; Rupert Everett; Katherine Helmond; Bo Hopkins; Ricki Lake; Debi Mazar; Martha Plimpton
- Cinematography: Christopher Taylor
- Edited by: Lauren Zuckerman
- Music by: Rick Cox; Jeff Elmassian
- Production company: Coast Entertainment
- Distributed by: IRS Media
- Release dates: June 5, 1992 (Seattle International Film Festival); August 25, 1993 (United States)
- Running time: 93 minutes
- Country: United States
- Language: English
- Box office: $121,475

Inside Monkey Zetterland is a 1992 independent comedy film directed by Jefery Levy and written by Steve Antin. The film follows Monkey Zetterland, a former child actor turned aspiring screenwriter and the goings-on with his eccentric family and friends. The story uses voiceover narration and is interspersed with fantasy sequences.

== Plot ==
Monkey Zetterland is a struggling screenwriter and a former child actor who is working on a historical script based on the defunct Red Car subway of Los Angeles. He lives in a building owned by his neurotic mother Honor Zetterland, who is a famous soap opera star. While secretly hoping there is a future in acting for Monkey, she attempts to turn her other son, hairdresser Brent, into a film star.

Honor shows up at Monkey's apartment to borrow his epsom salts at the same time that his disagreeable girlfriend, Daphne, arrives. His sister Grace arrives in tears to reveal that her lesbian girlfriend, Cindy, has become pregnant from a one-night stand in an attempt to bring the two of them closer. Honor rents the basement apartment to Sasha and Sofie, a gay man and lesbian posing as husband and wife while publishing an underground newsletter that outs closeted gay people in the entertainment industry.

As if this were not enough, a creepy woman, Bella, shows up with a fan letter for Honor, and another strange lady, Imogene, begins openly pursuing Monkey's attention. After a series of confrontations with Monkey, Daphne moves out. At around the same time, his estranged father Mike, who was absent for long periods of time throughout the Zetterlands’ lives, surfaces in time for Thanksgiving.

While everyone busies themselves with their personal issues, Grace discovers that Sasha and Sofie are in fact terrorists who intend to bomb a local insurance agency that is denying medical coverage to people with HIV and AIDS. Sofie comes up with a plan to send Grace into the agency with a bomb, which Grace and Sasha believe is set up to give Grace enough time to escape before it detonates. It is not, and Grace dies in the explosion.

This event pulls everyone out of their own selfish interests and forces them to reexamine their lives and the people around them. The patriarch of the family disappears again, Cindy and her newborn baby are taken in by the family, and Monkey decides to let Imogene get closer to him. Then, just as things are starting to fall into place, Monkey comes home to find his apartment ransacked and his finally finished script, of which was his only copy, stolen.

Later that evening, Bella, who left a fan letter for Honor, arrives with Monkey's stolen script and a gun. She tries to shoot Honor, but hits the family dog instead. She is taken down, but the ensuing drama pulls the remaining emotional conflicts of the family into place. Honor accepts that Monkey is never going to become a famous actor. Instead of pushing him into acting, she uses her industry connections to have his script produced into a film starring Brent.

== Cast ==
- Steve Antin as "Monkey" Zetterland
  - Nicholas Matus as Young "Monkey" Zetterland
- Patricia Arquette as Grace
- Sandra Bernhard as Imogene
- Sofia Coppola as Cindy
- Tate Donovan as Brent Zetterland
- Rupert Everett as Sasha
- Katherine Helmond as Honor Zetterland
- Bo Hopkins as Mike Zetterland
- Ricki Lake as Bella, The Stalker
- Debi Mazar as Daphne
- Martha Plimpton as Sofie
- Robin Antin as Waitress In Canters
- Frances Bay as Grandma
- Luca Bercovici as Boot Guy
- Chuck Grieve as Guy At Taco Stand
- Lance Loud as The Psychiatrist
- Chris Nash as Policeman
- Lou Pearlman as The Warden / Observation Psychiatrist (as Louis J. Pearlman)
- Blair Tefkin as Brent's Assistant
- Marc Lafia as Observation Psychiatrist
- Melissa Sullivan as Observation Psychiatrist (as Melissa Lechner)
- Lauren Zuckerman as Observation Psychiatrist

== Production ==
The inspiration from the script came from Steve Antin’s own background, as he himself started out as a child actor before getting into writing. The script originated as a book of short stories titled Campfire Stories. While Antin was filming the 1988 movie The Accused, Jodie Foster asked to read some of Antin's stories, after which she suggested he turn the stories into a film script.

== Release ==
The film had its world premiere at the 1992 Seattle International Film Festival on June 5, 1992. It went on to screen at the Toronto Festival of Festivals on September 12, 1992, and was given a limited release in the United States on August 25, 1993.

=== Home media ===
It was released in 1994 on VHS and in 1995 on Laserdisc. The film was released on DVD on February 6, 2007.

== Critical reception ==
On review aggregate website Rotten Tomatoes, Inside Monkey Zetterland has an approval rating of 71% based on 7 reviews.

Emanuel Levy of Variety said the film "is funny, sharp-tongued and devious, but never wicked or nasty. Its resonant comedy is so attuned to the Zeitgeist that any urban dweller will find something relevant in it." Marjorie Baumgarten of The Austin Chronicle gave it three stars, writing, "These actors all create riveting snapshots of oddballs in action," but also noting the film has a "rambling storyline".

Negative reviews criticized the story and characterization. Desson Howe of The Washington Post wrote, "After the characters have taken up most of the movie airing their idiosyncrasies, they undergo melodramatic fates that reveal little more than Antin's recession of an imagination." TV Guide gave a mixed review, praising the film for "inescapably [capturing] the LA attitude", but noting "it has no real center, a point underlined by frequent scenes in which characters drift not only out of the frame, but into different rooms." The review commented that Levy "never gives a clue how he relates to his characters or story, which isn't much help to the viewer", but observed Coppola is given a chance to redeem herself after her much maligned performance in The Godfather Part III. Stephen Holden of The New York Times praised the ensemble cast and said the film "flaunts a number of audacious cinematic tricks", but disliked the film's "mood of manic chaos".

=== Accolades ===
Tate Donovan was nominated for Best Supporting Male at the 1994 Independent Spirit Awards. The film was also nominated for the Grand Jury Prize for Dramatic Feature at the 1993 Sundance Film Festival.
