= Varvara Melnikova =

Russian business executive

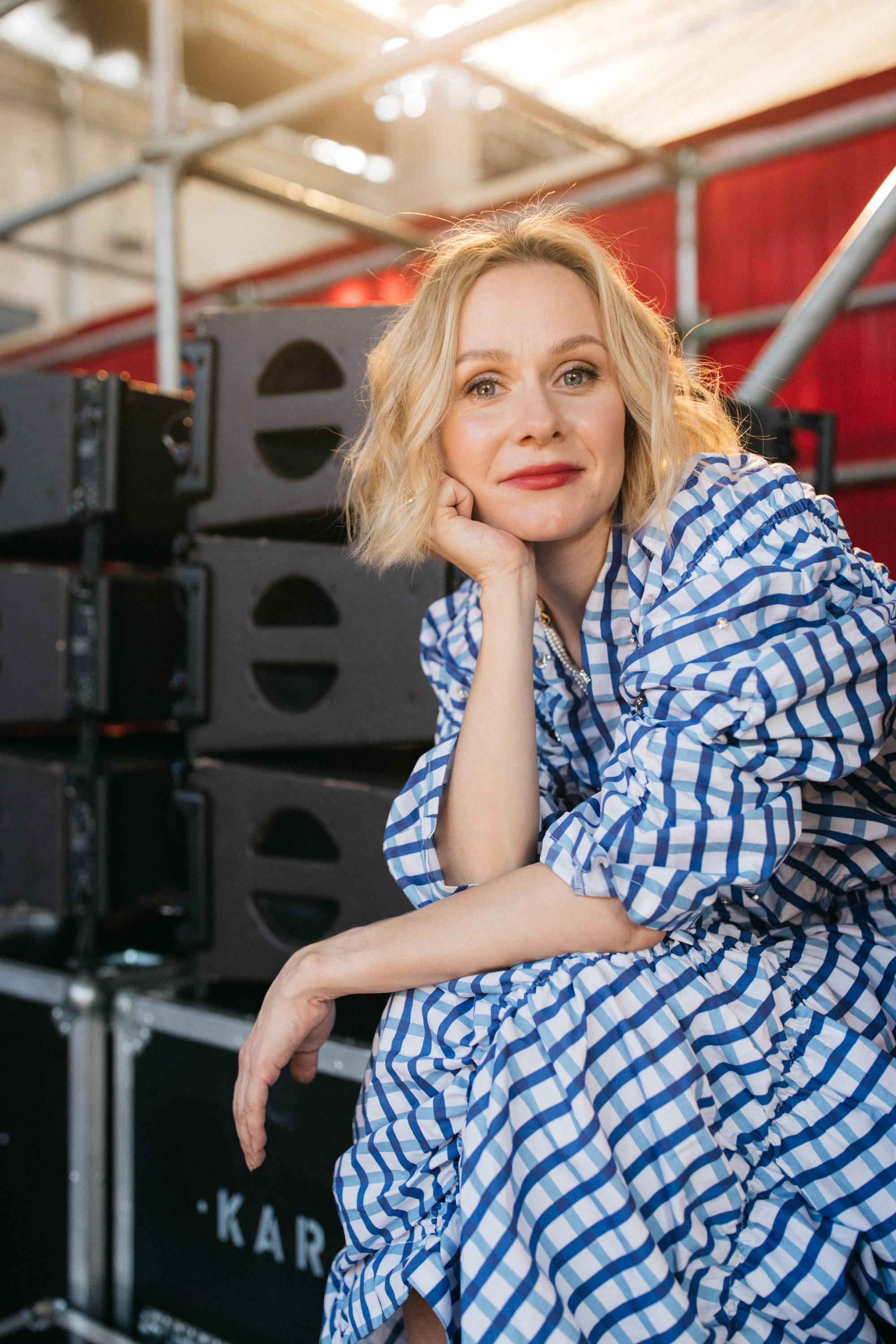

Varvara Melnikova (born 1980) is a Russian business executive and urban planner.

== Career ==
She is chief executive officer (CEO) of the Strelka Institute for Media, Architecture and Design, a non-profit post-graduate institute in the field of urban studies located in Moscow. Melnikova established the Strlka Institute with Rem Koolhaas in 2009. In 2013, it was named one of the world's top 100 architectural schools by Domus magazine. She is a founding partner of KB Strelka, a bureau associated with the Strelka Institute which consults in the fields of architecture, urban planning and cultural programming. Melnikova is also CEO for the Afisha Publishing House, which produces an online guide on culture and entertainment.

She is a member of the Commission on urban areas development of the Russian Ministry of Construction, Housing and Utilities.

Melnikova contributed to the redesign of Gorky Park in 2011. She was part of the team that prepared the "Fair enough" exhibition in the Russian pavilion at the XIVth Venice Biennale of Architecture; the exhibition received a special prize at the Biennale. In 2013, she was included in the Calvert Journal's list of the 25 Russian women who have had the most influence on Russian culture.
