= The stack (philosophy) =

Model for understanding the internet and computers as a global megastructure.

The stack is a concept used in science and technology studies, the philosophy of technology and media studies to describe the multiple interconnected layers that computation depends on at a planetary scale. The term was introduced by Benjamin H. Bratton in a 2014 essay and expanded upon in his 2016 book The Stack: On Software and Sovereignty

== Stacks and layers ==
The term draws upon the concept of the stack in programming and the layered architecture of the Internet Protocol. Different scholars have proposed different layers that make up the stack, often depending on their area of interest such as a specific cultural context (ie. Chinese or European internet) or a specific technology (ie. artificial intelligence, self-driving cars). The term has also been used to describe a model for ensuring diversity in the digital humanities.

=== Benjamin Bratton's six layers ===
Bratton's model, as described and illustrated in The Stack: On Software and Sovereignty, consists of six interconnected layers: earth, cloud, city, address, interface and the user—that together form a planetary-scale computational architecture he calls “The Stack.” The model is proposed as an “accidental megastructure” through which computation reshapes political geography and sovereignty. Critics have highlighted the book’s significance for debates in political theory, design, and media studies.

1. Earth: Computing requires materials mined from the earth and energy that is often generated by oil or coal, producing electronic waste. This layer provides the building blocks of the global digital stack.
2. Cloud: Global, usually corporate technology services like Google, which have a type of power Ian Bogost calls a "weird sovereignty".
3. City: The lived experience of physically interacting with the global computer network in daily life, often discussed in relation to smart cities.
4. Address: Identification of individual users and objects and its use for management and control.
5. Interface: How users are connected to computers and systems.
6. The user: The actual humans (and nonhumans) that interact with computers and computational systems.

=== Layers in "the Chinese stack" ===
Gabriele de Seta has proposed three additional layers to describe "the Chinese stack", which is not limited to the borders of China but is entwined with planetary networks. These layers maintain the focus on planetary computing and the internet as a global system, but support analysis of the connections and lack thereof between parts of the internet, as well as how it relates to power.

1. Gateways: interfaces between systems allowing different types of data to be connected. QR codes are an example.
2. Sieves: filters, blacklists, verification systems and regulations that provide access to parts of the internet to some users.
3. Domes: enclosures that aim to control parts of the internet by shutting off access to the rest of the stack.

=== Haroon Sheikh's layers ===
In an article on European digital sovereignty, Haroon Sheikh uses layers inspired by Bratton's: the resource layer, the chips layer, the network layer, the cloud layer, the intelligence layer, the applications layer and the connected device layer. Sheikh describes Bratton's layers as coming from a "more speculative philosophical approach", while Sheikh considers his own analysis to be more pragmatic in that it aims to understand the digital capacities of the European Union. As such, it follows industry distinctions and leaves out users while keeping the basic idea of a layered stack.

== Governance and power ==
The layered framework of the stack is used to analyze how power, control and governance are enacted globally through technology. The stack has been used in the fields of economics and business to explain the connections between technology and global capitalism.

Bratton discusses how sovereignty changes with global structures like the stack. Namely, there is a shift from territorial or national sovereignty, where a geographically defined nation rules itself, to a system where a global corporation like Google can operate as a global sovereign. This builds on Michel Foucault's theories of governmentality and power, and Bratton's book has been described as possible to read as "a Foucaudian toolkit that lifts out the useful parts".

== Reception ==
Although Bratton's book has been criticised as overly long and complex, the term is used in scholarship on the internet. In his critical essay "Stacktivism" (a reference to the pejorative term slacktivism) Geert Lovink describes the book as a "media theory classic" that is "inspiring to disagree with." Lovink further argues that the term "the stack" has become a "general container concept, in danger of becoming an empty signifier". Lovink also argues that, rather than a singular stack, the concept should be expanded into "a rainbow of a thousand stacks", such as Tiziana Terranova's "red stack" or the "green stack" aiming to reduce the extreme energy use of blockchain and data centres.
