= Marc Lafia =

American artist and filmmaker (born 1955)

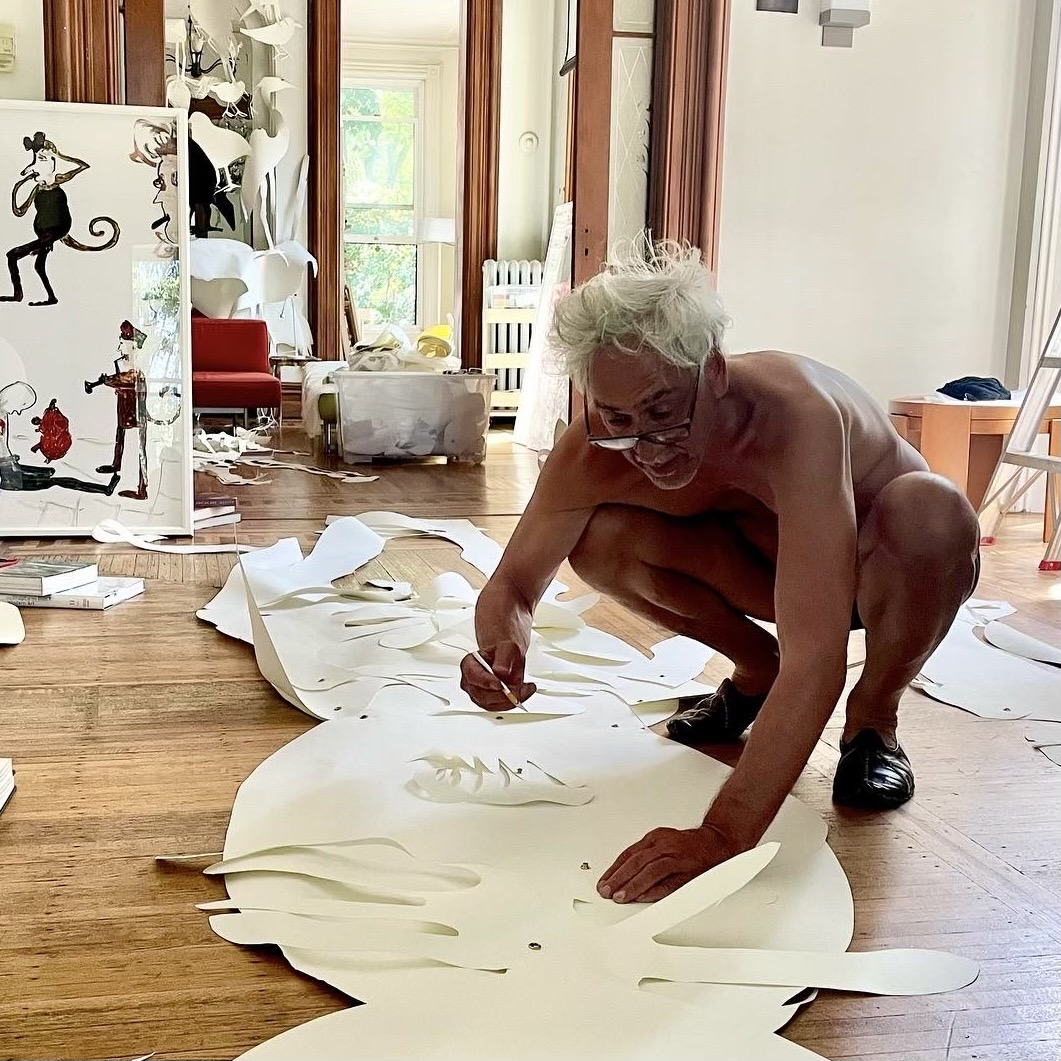
- Marc Lafia in his home studio.
- Born: November 21, 1955 (age 70); Philadelphia, Pennsylvania, U.S.
- Education: Whitman College, Phi Beta Kappa; UCLA; Harvard University
- Known for: Net.Art, Transmedia, Photography, Writing, Relational Aesthetics, Media Studies, Computational Photography, Social Sculpture, Digital Culture, New Media, Transversality, Visual Culture, Visual Rhetoric
- Notable work: Memex Engine (1999); Ambient Machines, (2000); Exploding Oedipus (2001); Variable Montage (2002–2004); The Battle of Algiers (2004); Permutations (2005); Love & Art (2006); Paradise (2009); Cinema Engine (2009)
- Movement: Net.Art, Experimental Film, Network Culture, Social Network Photography
- Website: marclafia.squarespace.com

Marc Lafia (born November 21, 1955) is a multidisciplinary artist, filmmaker, photographer, writer, educator, and information architect. He is known for his contributions to the intersection of art, film, and technology. Lafia’s works explore computation and the impact of network culture on media, communication, and the self.

Lafia’s commissioned films and multi-screen computational installations have been featured in the Whitney Museum of American Art, New York; the Walker Art Center, Minnesota; the Tate Online: Intermedia Art; Zentrum für Kunst und Medientechnologie (ZKM), Karlsruhe, Germany; NTT InterCommunication Center (ICC), Tokyo, Japan; and Centre Georges Pompidou, Paris, France.

Both a practitioner and critic of new media and computation, Marc Lafia founded Art+Culture.com, a net-based archive and exploratorium of contemporary art and culture, in 1998. Art+Culture.com amounted to one of the first art-oriented archival tools of the early internet age and brought Lafia notable recognition in the arts community after winning SXSW’s Best in Show award in 2000.

As a visual artist, Lafia has focused on the mediums of drawing, painting, sculpting, and photography. Lafia’s photographic works are located in real and material exhibition galleries around the world, as well as in non-local emergent net galleries. Lafia has exhibited multiple works in China, starting with his solo show Eternal Sunshine at the Minsheng Museum, the Shenzhen Sculpture Biennale, the Guangdong Museum of Art, and Shanghai’s BANK Gallery.

As a performance artist, Lafia has directed and produced several stage pieces. He is known for blending visual projections, music and recordings, and dance. Lafia’s most notable performance pieces include Everything is Everything and There is Nothing Else (2019) and The Practicing Human (2023). Through narratives that span several years and time periods, Lafia's performance pieces explore temporal perceptions across cultures and investigate how diverse concepts of time shape worldviews, social dynamics, and collectivity.

Marc Lafia has lectured and taught courses and graduate seminars on film directing, acting for the camera, new media art practices, philosophy, and methods at Stanford University; San Francisco Art Institute; California Institute of the Arts; Pratt Institute of Design; Art Center College of Design, Pasadena, California; New York Film Academy; and Columbia University. Lafia’s essays on the topics of new media art, computational cinema, and the nature of the image have been published in Artforum International, Digital Creativity, Eyebeam.org, and Film and Philosophy Journal. He has also published three books with Punctum Books: Image Photograph (2015), Everyday Cinema (2017), and The Event of Art (2020).

Marc Lafia resides in Brooklyn, New York.

== Early career ==
Marc Lafia’s early creative works were in the fields of 16mm filmmaking, advertising, screenwriting for feature films, and music videos as a writer in Hollywood.

Lafia was the writer and conceptualist for Madonna’s Express Yourself (1989), which won the MTV Best Female Video and Best Director awards. Lafia was also a writer and conceptualist for Don Henley’s End of the Innocence (1990), winner of the MTV Best Male Performer award, and wrote a version for Michael Jackson’s Black or White (1991). While a member of the Writers Guild of America, Lafia was involved in writing screen adaptations, including the Marvel comic book Iron Man and the comic strip Judge Dredd for Ed Pressman films. Lafia also wrote an adaptation of Rudy Rucker’s novel Software, which won the Philip K. Dick Award in 1982.

Throughout the 1990s, Lafia shifted his focus to visual art, creating works such as The Vanndemar Memex or Lara Croft Stripped Bare by Her Assassins, Even (1999) and Ambient Machines (2000). Variable Montage (2003-2004) gained prominence when exhibited at ZKM’s Net_Condition. The work was heralded for its ambition to challenge fixed temporal constraints, particularly within the realm of cinema, and cemented Lafia’s computational direction throughout his career.

In 1998, Marc Lafia founded Art+Culture.com: How Things Go Together. One of the first archiving engines of its time, it was designed as an algorithm demonstrating connections between artists across design, film, literature, music, performing arts, and visual arts. Art+Culture also deployed the internet as a platform to computationally create both didactic and associative links between artists, art disciplines, art movements, and cultural themes.

ID Magazine wrote of Art+Culture: “In 1981, the manic visionary Ted Nelson predicted the development of a giant database of ideas from around the world, cross-listed and cross-linked, called Xanadu. In a way, the web made Nelson’s prophecy a reality, but the ambitious artandculture site makes it beautiful.” Red Herring wrote: “a new website, artandculture.com, makes the elusive realm of sensibility visible … a machine that discovers accidents, creating art as it goes.”

While Lafia’s cyberpunk works from the 1990s were based on interactivity and built of code and screens, his continuing art practice would include new works using a great array of fabrics and plastics as nods to fragility and the precarious. Lafia drew inspiration from sculptures of the 1970s by Eva Hesse, Robert Morris, Suzy Spence, and Richard Tuttle.

== Films ==
Marc Lafia’s filmography spans various formats, evolving from 16mm and 35mm, to digital channels, to computational and interactive multi-screen digital installations, to transmedia works exhibited variously in international museums, art centers and festivals. Lafia has explored multiple genres, including narrative, documentary, and computational film.

One of Marc Lafia’s first feature films, the 35mm Exploding Oedipus (2001), premiered at the Seattle International Film Festival as well as at several LGBT festivals, solidifying Lafia’s popularity with queer audiences. Starring Bruce Ramsay as Hilbert, Exploding Oedipus chronicles a young man struck by bohemia and sexually and psychologically coming to know himself. The film was well received across its festivals as a feature film that explored the construction of self through image deconstruction.

After the success of Art+Culture.com, Marc Lafia’s work shifted from a focus on imaging to visualization. Vanndemar Memex, or Laura Croft Stripped Bare by her Assassins, Even (1999) premiered at the Net_Condition exhibition in ZKM, Germany. Also known as the Memex Engine, a viewer’s input of a selection of a code name and avatar determined the narrative plot sequence out of a modulated plot structure.

Ambient Machines (2000) was another online interactive work through which viewers had creative control of their experiences via a menu of ambient music and a gallery of visual elements, image processing, and navigational controls. Ambient Machines was exhibited in 2003 at Le-Musee-Divisioniste, Paris, France; Chiangma Media Arts Festival, Thailand; and Machinsta, Russia. Variable Montage (2002) was also a computational work. The 3-screen algorithmic cinema installation exhibited at Future Cinema in ZKM, Germany and NTT InterCommunication Center in Tokyo, Japan. In the piece, montages migrated into a computationally generated, infinitely variable form; the work was heralded at the time as “challeng[ing] traditional narrative structures.”

Lafia continued to explore multi-screen computational films, with works including Possibilities of a Beautiful Love (2002), Durations: Loops and Iterations (2002), and Sing to Me and Tell Me Your Story (2002–2003). Permutations was a series of multi-screen films that Lafia produced once per day with a Canon Xapshot digital camera over a period of several years, starting in 2005. In examining the digital characteristic of an excess of organizational and narrative tropes, Lafia highlights the emergence of limitless potential cinemas.

Marc Lafia attributed his transition from traditional filmmaking to media installation work to the idea that “at the same time of an intensified commercialization of the film circuit and a narrowing down of the film form and its language, contemporary art locates cinema within the broader landscape of contemporary visual culture.” The element of multiple directions central to computation creates a sense of resolution and tension, “of a different order perhaps than expectations of a more commercial cinema.”

In the Battle of Algiers (2006), a multi-screen computational version of Gillo Pontecorvo’s 1966 film of the same name, Lafia deployed an algorithm to break the film down into constituent parts and reassemble them in a random order, creating a new version of the film that is different every time it is viewed. The interactive film work was commissioned by the Whitney Museum and Tate Online, premiering at the Whitney in 2004 and later at the Tate Online in 2006. 744 hours in length, the film investigates power dynamics, shared authorship, and distributed editorial control through its computational analysis of the underlying historical events.

Lafia would return to narrative long form films exploring fictional documentaries and biographies. Love & Art (2006) involved diary elements, documentary storytelling, and tragic narrative in shadowing a Park Slope, Brooklyn family and deploying recordings captured from their daily lives and travels. As an experimental narrative feature film, Paradise (2009), defies traditional narrative expectations; a group of theater students meet to discuss 'fiction and the real.’ The film was described as a “messy movie that moves, ceaselessly.” Revolution of the Present (2014), a documentary film, showcases the impacts of accelerated capitalism on cities, economies, and individuals, with fifteen international thinkers reflecting on the complexity of the contemporary moment against a visually striking backdrop of sounds and images. The film was well-received, credited with highlighting how “our desires have become distributed, exploded into images … and over screens, our eyes relentlessly drop to view.”

27 (2015) centers on James English Leary, a 27-year-old artist, engaged in candid conversation with Lafia in his studio. The film is a multi-layered narrative, with James’s fears and pleasures interwoven with a diverse array of characters. Part documentary, part fiction, and part biography, portraiture, and social sculpture, 27 introduces seven individuals ranging from ages 13 to 54 and challenges conventional notions of adulthood.

Other contemporary Lafia films chronicle network culture’s shift from representation to presentation. In Hi, How Are You Guest 10497 (2012), Lafia delves deeper into network culture’s presentation and panoptic qualities. The film centers a young woman in Manhattan who tries to find connections with anonymous guests through an online network. Revolution of Everyday Life (2010) also centers women self-documenting, blending documentary film with fictional qualities that espouse network culture’s backdrop on the film itself.

Marc Lafia Filmography
Title	Release date	Premieres and festivals	Type
27	2015		HD Video
Revolution of the Present	2014		HD Video
Hi, How are You Guest 10497	2012	After Set, Tribeca Film Festival, Tribeca Grand Brucennial	HD Video
Raindrop Ecstasy	2011		3-Screen HD Video Installation
Double Fantasy	2011-2013		Video Diptych
Revolution of Everyday Life	2010		HD Feature
Cinema Series, You're Seven Today, You're a Man Now; Aim Straight Ahead, You Ever Read the Books You Burn, Like Honey, I See You Chancellor, Hunter Victim	2010-2013		Video Diptych Series
Paradise	2009		HD Feature
Love and Art	2008		DV Feature
Oldham Ahead	2007		Documentary with 7-Screen Installation
Zanzibar	2005		3-Screen Narrative
Permutations	2005		365 Multi-Screen Short Films
Martin	2004		Long-Form Narrative
Confessions of an Image	2002		
Exploding Oedipus	2001	Mill Valley Film Festival; Seattle International Film Festival; New American Cinema	
Baldwin	1994		35mm Short
Auto-re-tour	1982		16mm Short
Fini La Guerre	1981		13mm Short
Variable Montage	2003-2004	Future Cinema, ZKM; NTT Tokyo InterCommunication Center (ICC)	
Ambient Machines	2000	Flash Film Festival, Flashforward; Le-Musée-Divisioniste Mediacentre; Chiangma Media Arts Festival, Thailand; Machinsta, Russia	Interactive Film
Vandemar Memex, or Laura Croft Stripped Bare by her Assassins, Even (Memex Engine)	1999	Net_Condition, ZKM	Interactive Film

== Photography ==
Lafia’s photography projects engage new technologies of contemporary image presentation and distribution. The Event of the Imaging; The Image Remembered; American Flags; Still, an Image; and F4, The Photography Desktop Collective reflect Lafia’s contemplations on the possibilities of imaging.

Marc Lafia moved to San Francisco after his time in Hollywood, which influenced his initial close reading of photography at the beginning of his career. Using analog photography, Lafia created Memories of Photography, which unfolded as an exploration of photographing photography. This work, featuring the inaugural digital watch camera, reimagined analog photography as a dynamic component of a real-time era. Confessions of an Image, integrated within networked photography and cinema, attempted to showcase a world undergoing continuous imaging in real-time, electronic and networked.

In social network photography, Lafia was passionate about the immediacy of the moment, or photography from the study of a mere record to fleeting representation. Network culture’s impact on media and communication inspired Lafia’s following photography works. Specifically, Lafia became invested in how network culture moved imaging from representation to presentation. In his Dystopia and its Content(ment)s exhibition at BANK Gallery in Shanghai, Lafia showcased three individual perspectives to shape the contemporary techno-social, image-orientated reality as dystopian while situating instances of personal contentment within it. Marc Lafia culled his photography through social network platforms such as Tumblr and Chatroulette.

In The Tumblr Room, 35 large format prints made both material and public, in large scale photographic form, the circulation and exchange of photographs, text messages, and software formats and protocols across Tumblr. Through a continuation of his social network photography work, Lafia presented the intimacy of revelations and desires through blogging. The work’s title reflected the sense of habitation within Tumblr pages as it exists in real space.

The Anatomy of Pictures revived the focus of materiality, infusing natural elements onto photographs representing André Malraux's virtual museum. Pictures exemplifies a performative exploration of historical time overshadowing mythic time, challenging the concept of historical time within the digital realm.

Marc Lafia Photography
Title	Date
PICTURES	2016
The Tumblr Room, Vol. 2	2014
The Tumblr Room	2012
Anatomy of Pictures	2012
Here and Elsewhere	2012
Cartographies	2011
Public Relations, Hugs and Kisses	2011
ChatRoulette	2010
Film Stills, Still History	2007-2011
Self-Exposure	2007
The Image, Alone	2005
The Event of the Image	2003
History and Disappearance	2001
Memories of Photography	1998

== Publications and Talks ==
Marc Lafia has published three books with Punctum Books: Image Photograph (2015), Everyday Cinema (2017), and The Event of Art (2020). Lafia's essays on the topics of new media art, computational cinema, and the nature of the image have been published in Artforum International, Digital Creativity, Eyebeam.org, and Film and Philosophy Journal.

In his writing, Lafia explores contemporary art’s role in society and argues that art serves as a transformative “event” that disrupts habitual ways of thinking and perceiving. His work has been described as contributing to the fields of “post-media” and “post-relational” art, showcasing a departure from traditional media-based art and relational aesthetics.

In recent years, Marc Lafia has been a guest lecturer on subjects such as urban planning and intellectual inquiry at the Shanghai Art Academy; the New School; and NYU Tisch.

== Notable works ==
Marc Lafia is known for his major extensive performance pieces. Everything is Everything and There is Nothing Else (2019) was a 141 minute multichannel video installation. The first performance of the cycle of works, performed live in 2019, is now a traveling video installation. The Practicing Human (2023), performed over two evenings in New York, was drawn from Lafia’s 545 original prose poems written over five years. The work featured Butoh dancers, mask performers, augmented projections, AI haptic suits, and audience participation. The performance piece was also recorded and filmed for museum and gallery installation. The poems that inspired these performance pieces were also recorded into hours of audio posted across major music streaming platforms.

Lafia’s focus on network culture evolves through his career. He pivots between its imaging and visualization (with Art+Culture.com, Memex, Variable Montage, and the Battle of Algiers), representation and presentation (ChatRoulette), and criticisms, followed by a showcasing of understanding and acceptance (Revolution of the Present, other contemporary performance art pieces). One throughline throughout his works is an exploration of the limits of the image, art, and media.

Many of Lafia’s works shown in China have come to prominence in recent years. Extinction, Extension: A New Slice of the Geologic Record (2023), exhibited at the Guangzhou Triennial in 2023, deployed large paper figures of men and extinct birds and symbolized Lafia’s exploration of fixed time. The fragility of paper evokes awareness of species’ transience throughout the timeline of existence. In Eternal Sunshine, exhibited at the Minsheng Museum of Art, print and video works reflected network culture’s restructuring of the subject and self in contemporary society.

Lafia has used blackboards as a fixture of his work throughout China, exhibitions that solicited audience feedback, creativity, and self-expression publicly as a micro-manifestation of social media networks and posting rituals. Lists on the boards have included audience members’ favorite books, films, vacation spots, as well as their intimate desires and fantasies.

In a solo exhibition of #Image, Lafia displayed prints, sculptures and installations that together represented the broad techno-social concerns central to Lafia’s career. Large prints were contrasted with books, representing older material technology, which included his newly released Image Photograph. A garden installation in the shape of an inverted pyramid was made of fabric that mimicked the filters of the iPhone camera.

Marc Lafia has won several awards as an information architect, including the Best of Show in the 2000 South by Southwest Festival; Silver Medal from ID Magazine; the Communication Arts Award for Interactive Design; the One Show Award; and the Art Directors’ Club Award.
