= Georgy Konstantinovich Totibadze =

Georgian painter

Georgy Totibadze
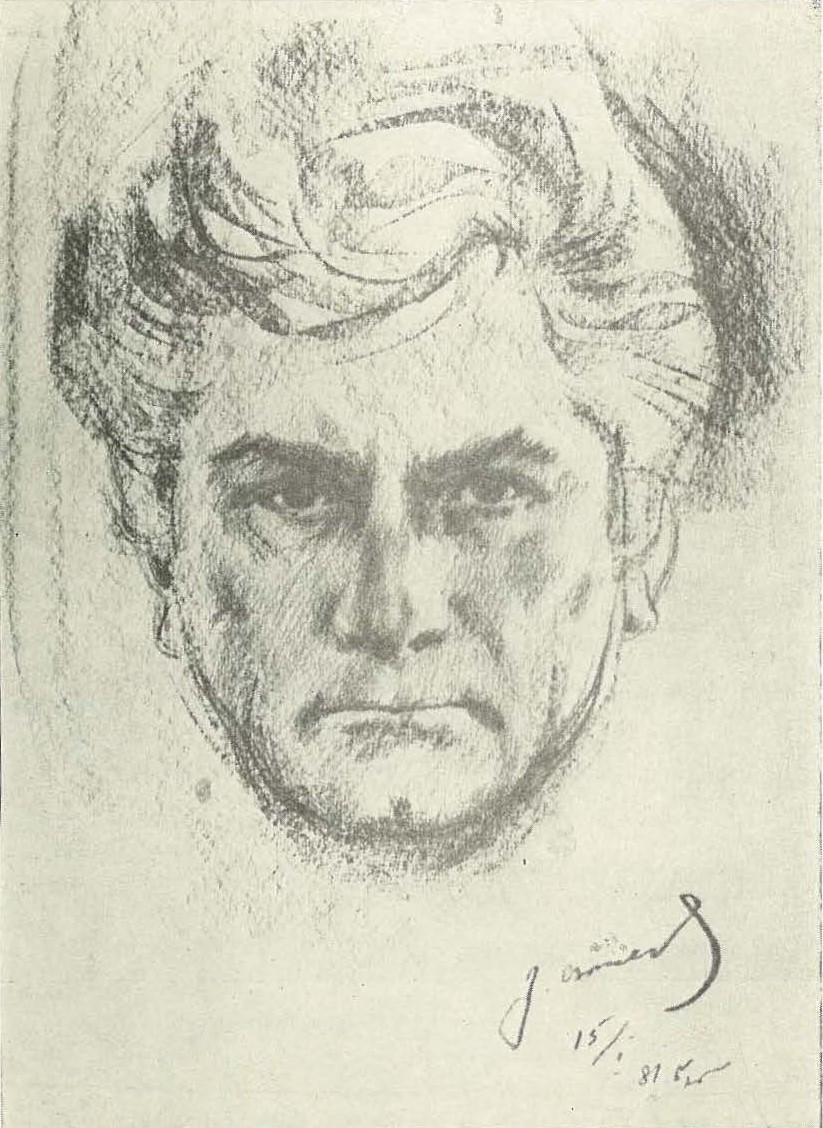
- Autoportrait of Georgy Totibadze
- Born: 29 October 1928; Tbilisi, Georgia
- Died: 8 April 2010 (aged 81); Tbilisi, Georgia
- Resting place: Didube Pantheon, Tbilisi
- Education: Ucha Japaridze
- Alma mater: Tbilisi State Academy of Arts; USSR Academy of Arts
- Awards: Honored Artist of the Georgian SSR; People's artist of the Georgian SSR

Georgy Konstantinovich Totibadze (Georgian: გოგი კონსტანტინეს ძე თოთიბაძე; 29 October 1928 – 8 April 2010) was a Georgian painter. He was a corresponding member of the USSR Academy of Arts 1975-2010.^{,}

== Biography ==
=== Youth and career ===
Georgy Totibadze was born on 29 October 1928 in Tbilisi.^{,} He lived at 11 Zanduleki Street in Tbilisi with his parents and his sister Nana. His father, Konstantin Antonovich Totibadze, was a physics teacher and his mother, Elena Khundadze, was a Georgian language teacher in a secondary school.^{,}

In 1947, Georgy Totibadze begins to study arts and painting at the Tbilisi State Academy of Arts. with teacher Ucha Japaridze, before receiving his diploma in 1953. In 1959, he obtained the title of professor and created his own artist workshop. He has been named rector of the Tbilisi State Academy of Arts from 1972 to 1982, where he taught arts and painting. Among his students was Gia Bugadze. He will then become an active member of the USSR Academy of Arts in 1975.^{,}

He deceased on 8 April 2010 and rests in the Didube Pantheon in Tbilisi.^{,}

=== Personal life ===
His first spouse was Nana Apollonovna Kutateladze (1946-2015), daughter of Apollon Kutateladze. Their children were Georgy and Konstantin Totibadze, who will later become painters, and Maria Totibadze, designer and fashion stylist.^{,} His second spouse, Tsisana Bejanovna Tstishvili (1937-2017) was an opera singer.

== Works ==
In 1970, Georgy Totibadze participated to the mural of the Pirosmani restaurant in Tbilisi.

Georgy Totibadze was specialised in painting and realised the portrait of M. Kavtaradze (1956) and the portrait of N. Amiradjibi (1957). He has also painted:

- "The metallurgists of Rustavi" (1958);
- "In the tea plantations" (1962);
- "Portrait of Dina Djitova" (1965);
- "Tamara" (1967);
- "Tamada" (1967) - Collections of the Tretyakov gallery;
- "The tea cultivator" (1970);
- "The Guria revolution in 1948" (1970);
- "The Khakheti winegrowers" - lithography (1979);
- "The Polychronion" (1988) - Collections of the Georgian National Museum and
- "Portrait of Elena Obrastsova" (1990)

The majority of his works are exhibited in public collections such as the Georgian National Museum, the S. Shervardnadze National Gallery, the Shalva Amirananshvili Museum of Fine Arts and mostly the Tretyakov gallery in Moscow.
