= Tani L. Cohen =

American film producer

Tani L. Cohen is an American film producer.

== Production credits ==
- Producer on the HBO feature documentary Mr. Conservative: Goldwater on Goldwater, about Barry Goldwater. The critically acclaimed film premiered on HBO in September 2006. Cohen produced it with Goldwater's granddaughter, CC Goldwater. The film screened as the Centerpiece at the Full Frame Film Festival and in the documentary competition at LAFF
- Producer "The Dust Factory", starring Hayden Panettiere, Armin Mueller-Stahl and Ryan Kelley. The film was released through MGM in 2005.
- Consulting producer on the independent film, "Living 'til the End,” which made its premiere at the Hamptons International Film Festival in October 2004.
- Executiver Producer Showtime film "Snow in August" adapted and directed by Richard Friedenberg starring Stephen Rea
- Producer "The Souler Opposite,” starring Christopher Meloni, which was featured at the AFI Film Festival
- Co-produced "How to Kill Your Neighbor's Dog,” starring Robin Wright Penn and Kenneth Branagh, which closed the Toronto International Film Festival.
- Co-produced "Replicant,” starring Jean-Claude Van Damme
- Co-produced "Forever Lulu,” starring Melanie Griffith and Patrick Swayze.
- Producer of "Septuplets" and "An American Town" starring Jonathan Taylor Thomas for 20th Century Fox Television.
- Line Producer "Guieivere" starring Stephen Rea and Sarah Polley {Miramix}
- Co-Producer "October 22" starring Ernie Hudson, Amanda Plummer, Tate Donavan
- Producer of Billy Kent's "Egg Salad"
- Producer "Inside Monkey Zetterland"

Cohen started her career running Brian De Palma's Fetch Productions. The feature films Scarface and Body Double were produced during her tenure there.

== Honors ==
Many festivals have recognized Cohen's work as an independent film producer. Three of her projects have screened in competition at the Sundance Film Festival – Inside Monkey Zetterland, starring Patricia Arquette, Sandra Bernhard, Sofia Coppola, Rupert Everett, Ricki Lake, Martha Plimpton, Katherine Helmond, Debi Mazer, Matha Plimpton, "Egg Salad,” starring Helen Shaver, and "Guinevere,” starring Stephen Rea and Sarah Polley.

Cohen received an Emmy nomination for executive producing the Showtime Original Feature "Snow in August,” starring Stephen Rea and Lolita Davidovich which was nominated for two additional Daytime Emmy Awards, including Best Director and Actor.
