= Network Culture =

2004 book by Tiziana Terranova

- Author: Tiziana Terranova
- Subject: Information Technology
- Genre: Non-fiction
- Publication date: 2004

Network Culture. Politics for the Information Age is a 2004 book by Italian scholar Tiziana Terranova, focusing on the effects of information technology on society.
