= Benjamin H. Bratton =

American sociologist (born 1968)

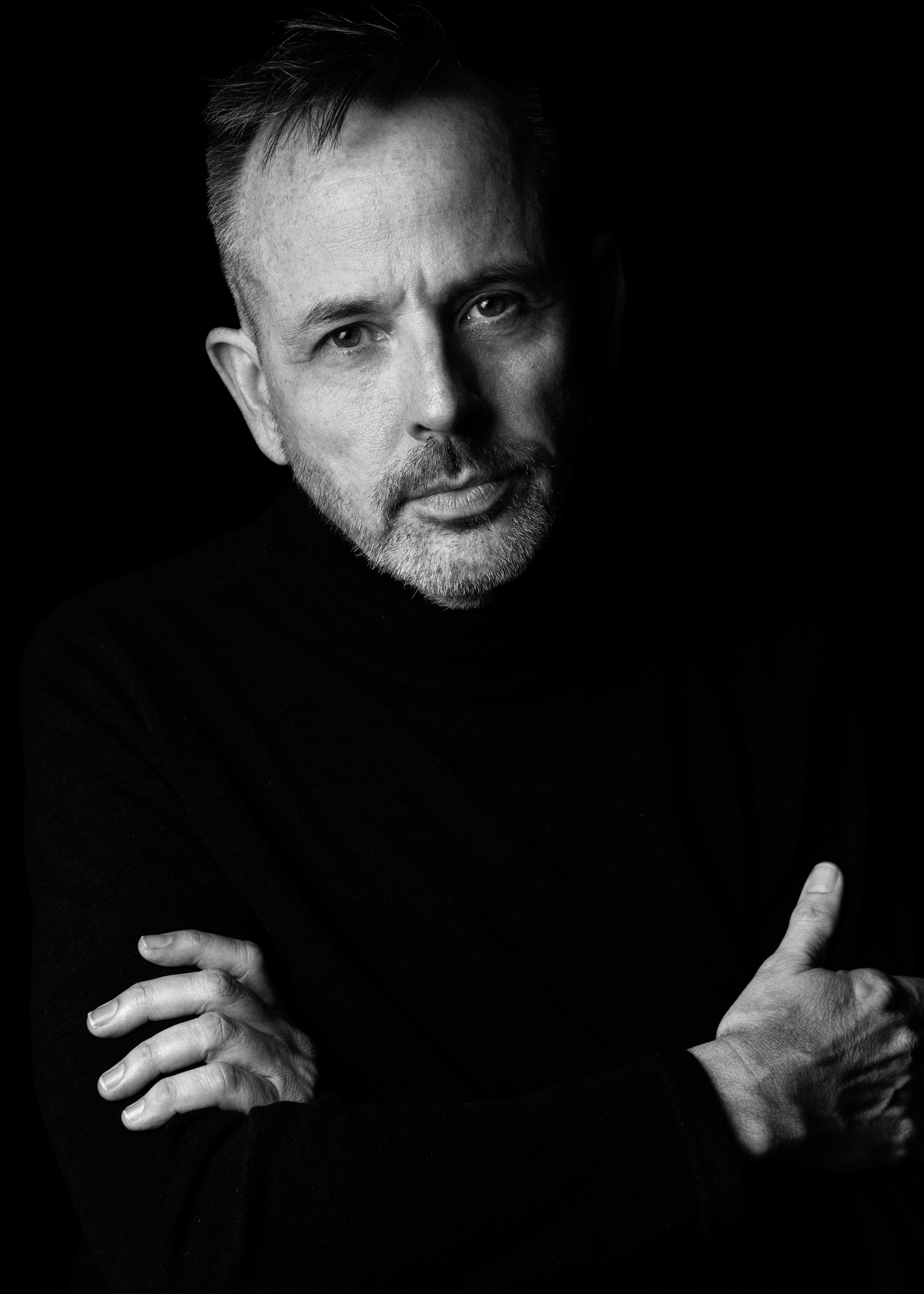
- Bratton in 2025
- Born: November 3, 1968 (age 57); Los Angeles, California

Academic background
- Education: University of California, Davis (BA); University of California, Santa Barbara (MA, PhD)
- Thesis: Software After States: Google, Jihad and Geoscapes (2010)
- Doctoral advisor: Roger Friedland

Academic work
- Institutions: Southern California Institute of Architecture (2001–2009); University of California, Los Angeles (2003–2008); University of California, San Diego (2009–); Strelka Institute (2016–2022); Berggruen Institute; Google
- Notable works: The Stack: On Software and Sovereignty (2015), The Revenge of the Real: Politics for a Post-Pandemic World (2021)
- Website: www.bratton.info

Benjamin H. Bratton (born 1968) is an American philosopher of technology known for his work spanning social theory, computer science, speculative design, artificial intelligence, and for his writing on "planetary scale computation".

== Career ==
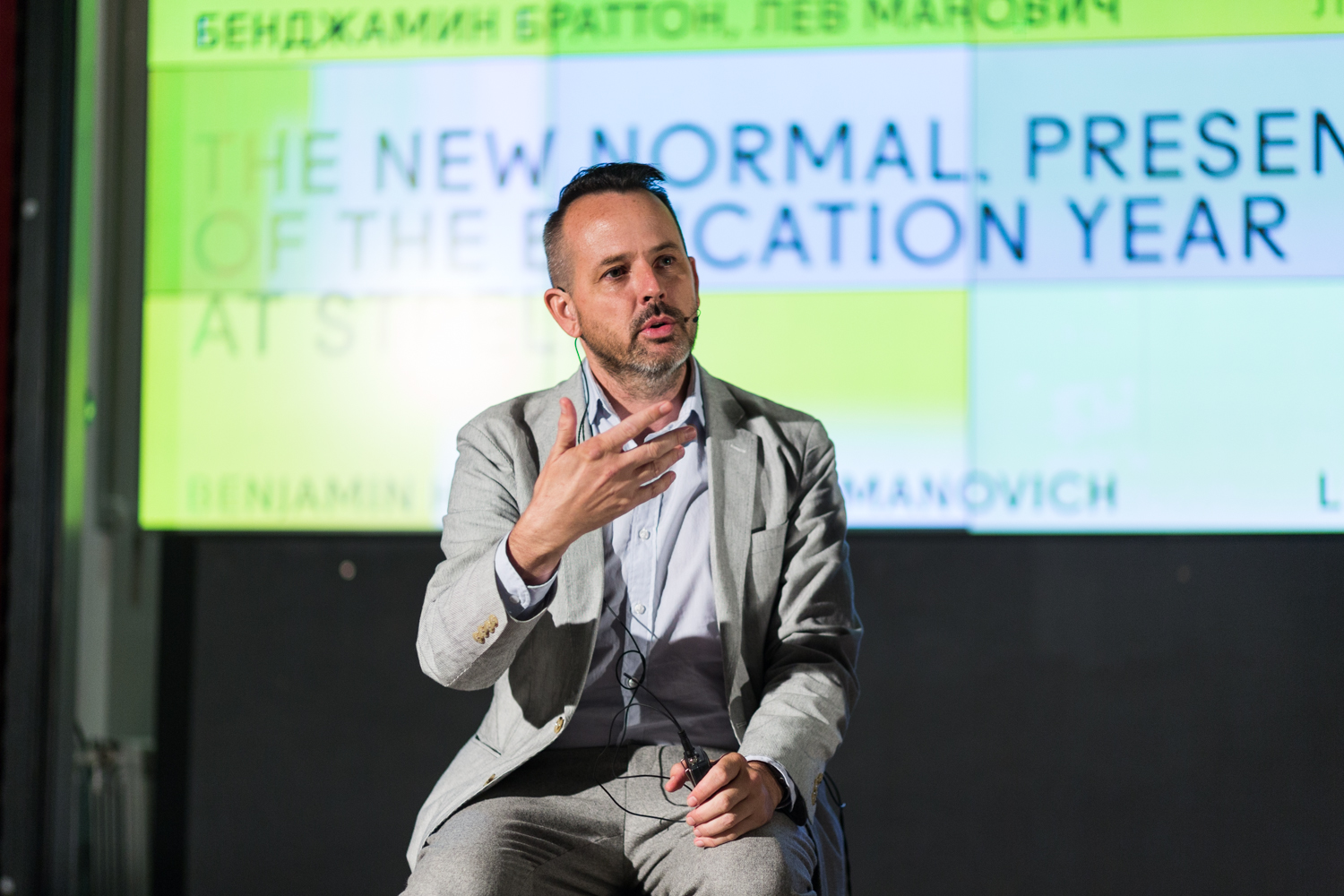
Benjamin Bratton in 2017

Bratton graduated with a BA degree from the University of California, Davis, followed by an MA (1998) and a PhD in sociology (2010, advised by Roger Friedland) from the University of California, Santa Barbara.

From 2001 to 2009, he taught at the Southern California Institute of Architecture in Los Angeles, where he later became a distinguished visiting professor. He also taught in the Department of Design / Media Arts at the University of California, Los Angeles (UCLA) from 2003 to 2008.

In 2009, he joined the University of California, San Diego, where he was appointed professor of visual arts. He founded University of California, San Diego's Speculative Design undergraduate major. He has taught at the European Graduate School in Saas-Fee, Switzerland and was visiting professor at NYU Shanghai (2019–22).

In 2016, he succeeded Rem Koolhaas as program director of the Strelka Institute, a Moscow-based think tank and post-graduate program in architecture, media, and design. He directed two three-year programs, The New Normal and The Terraforming. At the outbreak of the 2022 Russian invasion of Ukraine, the institute indefinitely suspended all programs.

As of 2022, Bratton was the director of a new research program on the speculative philosophy of computation called Antikythera, incubated by the Berggruen Institute. He is a visiting faculty researcher in the Paradigms of Intelligence research group at Google's Technology and Society division, led by Blaise Agüera y Arcas.

== Ideas ==
=== Planetary computation ("The Stack") ===
The Stack: On Software and Sovereignty was published by MIT Press in late 2015. The book challenges traditional ideas of sovereignty centered around the nation-state and develops a theory of geopolitics that accounts for sovereignty in terms of planetary-scale computation at various scales. Its two core arguments are that planetary-scale computation "distorts and deforms traditional Westphalian logics of political geography" and creates new territories in its own image, and that different scales of computing technology can be understood as forming an "accidental megastructure" that resembles a multi-layer network architecture stack, what Bratton calls "The Stack". The Stack is described as a platform, and Bratton argues that platforms represent a technical and institutional model equivalent to states or markets but reducible to neither. Bratton refers to the book as "a design brief" suggesting that the layers of this structure are modular and available to innovation and replacement.

=== Terraforming ===
He argues that the Anthropocene should be understood as a kind of accidental terraforming and the long-term project at hand is more deliberate and comprehensive composition of Earth systems for the extension of complex life in the future. "To terraform Earth to ensure that Earth can support Earth-like life". With a view of biochemistry and planetary timescales, Bratton contrasts the terraforming to Environmental Humanities which, he argues, rely on social reductionist and cultural determinist views.

=== Artificialization ===
According to Bratton, the artificial is not contrasted to nature but rather than the evolution selects for forms of life adept at artificializing their environments for purposes of "energy, matter and information capture". He situates this in the dynamic between autopoiesis and allopoiesis. He argues that through artificialization, it is possible to better understand naturally evolved forms, for example, synthetic biology and artificial intelligence.

=== Synthetic intelligence ===
An article Bratton wrote for The New York Times in 2015, "Outing AI", criticized overly anthropomorphic views of AI. "The Model is the Message", co-authored in 2022 with Blaise Agüera y Arcas, a vice president of artificial intelligence at Google, examined recent controversies over large language models and the problems of recognizing sentience in machines. The essay inspired an edited volume of the same name published by The New Centre for Research and Practice and &&&. The lecture film "After Alignment" argued that mainstream ideas of AI alignment are potentially misguided.

=== Planetary Sapience ===
The essay "Planetary Sapience" (2021) published in Noema compares the violent evolution of natural intelligence with the emergence of synthetic intelligence and considers their interrelation in terms of an understanding of intelligence as part of geological history and planetary formation. He contrasts this with the popular notions of Gaia and the Noosphere.

=== Speculative philosophy of technology ===
Bratton situates his philosophical investigations of technology in direct contrast with those founded in the Continental Philosophical tradition exemplified by Martin Heidegger. He criticizes Cosmotechnics’ reliance on Heidegger and what he regards as its anti-realism and conservative multiculturalism. Instead he emphasizes the role of "allocentric" perspectives exemplified by the "trauma" of the Copernican Revolution. He argues that philosophy must build on the raw insights of science and engineering, not merely critique them. In concert with the ideas of Lem, Manuel de Landa, Sara Walker, Brian Arthur, and others, he argues that technology evolves in ways not wholly dissimilar to biological evolution.

Bratton directs the Antikythera think-tank "reorienting planetary computation as a philosophical, technological, and geopolitical force". Affiliate researchers include computer scientists, philosophers, astrophysicists, architects, filmmakers historians and science-fiction authors. The program is incubated by Berggruen Institute and hosts research studios, lectures and salons and publishes a book series and online journal with MIT Press.

In 2014, his talk "We Need to Talk About TED" went viral after being given at San Diego TEDx. The lecture was highly critical of what he called TED's evangelical approach to innovation, calling the conference series "Middle Megachurch Infotainment". The talk was re-published in The Guardian and drew responses from TED founder, Chris Anderson.

== Publications ==
=== The Revenge of the Real: Politics for a Post-Pandemic World ===
In 2021, Verso Books published Bratton's book on the COVID-19 pandemic based on his essay "18 Lessons for Quarantine Urbanism". The book argues that the pandemic demonstrates on ongoing crisis of governance in the West, and that technological capacity to respond to planetary crises outstrips the social and cultural capacity for collective self-organization. The book discusses concepts of the epidemiological view of society, cultural controversies over masks, and points toward a positive biopolitics in sharp contrast with the work of Giorgio Agamben.

=== Dispute Plan to Prevent Future Luxury Constitution ===
His 2015 book Dispute Plan to Prevent Future Luxury Constitution was published by e-flux Journal and Sternberg Press in 2015. It launched publicly at the 2016 edition of the Transmediale festival in Berlin. In the description by Sternberg Press, the book is "kaleidoscopic theory-fiction" which, "links the utopian fantasies of political violence with the equally utopian programs of security and control".

=== Essays ===
"On Geoscapes & Google Caliphate: Except #Mumbai" examines the correspondence of political theology and planetary computation as modes of political geography.

His lecture "Surviving the Interface: the Envelopes, Membranes and Borders of Deep Cosmopolitics" considers the emergence of new forms of sovereignty derived from shared digital and urban infrastructures, and the challenges they pose to conventional understandings of architectural partitions and national borders.

His current work develops a political theory of planetary-scale computation and draws from disparate sources, from Paul Virilio, Michel Serres, and Carl Schmitt, to Alan Turing, Google Earth, and IPv6.

In 2017, Bratton completed The New Normal an ebook for Strelka Press, which outlines the radical effects that technology is having on our world and describes the emerging forms of city that we should now be designing for.

== Personal life ==
Bratton was born in Los Angeles, California in 1968 and grew up in Santa Paula, a small agricultural town in Southern California. He lives in La Jolla, California and has a son, Lucien, with writer Bruna Mori. He was adopted at an early age, and is the half-brother of Jamie Stewart of the band Xiu Xiu.

== Bibliography ==
=== Monographs ===
- The Stack: On Software and Sovereignty. MIT Press, 2016. ISBN 978-0-262-02957-5
  - Le Stack: Plateformes, logiciel et souveraineté, UGA Editions, 2016. ISBN 978-2377470464. (French)
- Dispute Plan to Prevent Future Luxury Constitution. Pref. Keller Easterling, Sternberg Press, 2015. ISBN 9783956791956.
  - Plan De Choque Para Derrotar El Exceso Futuro, pref. Keller Easterling, trans. Federico Fdez. Giordano, Holobionte Ediciones, 2024. ISBN 9788412572674. (Spanish)
- The Revenge of the Real. Verso, 2022. ISBN 9781839762574.
  - Die Realität schlägt zurück: Politik für eine postpandemische Welt. Translated by David Frühauf. Matthes & Seitz Berlin Verlag, 2022 (Kindle Edition). ISBN 9783751803564. (German)
- The Terraforming. Strelka Press, 2019. ISBN 9785907163027.
  - La Terraformation. Translated by Yves Citton and Aurélien Blanchard. Presses Du Reel, 2021. ISBN 9782378962647.(French)
  - La terraformación. Translated by Toni Navarro. Caja Negra, 2021. ISBN 9789871622993. (Spanish)
  - Γεωδιαμόρφωση. Translated by Yannis Fragos. Topovoros Exarcheion Publications, 2023. ISBN 9786185771324. (Greek)
  - Teraformiranje. Translated by Marko Bauer, Založba Sophia, 2020. ISBN 9789617003550. (Slovenian)
  - The Terraforming. Translated by Varvara Babitskata. Strelka Press, 2020. ISBN 9785907163171. (Russian)

=== Edited volumes ===
- Machine Decision is Not Final: China and the History and Future of AI. (co-edited with Ana Greenspan and Bogna Konior) Urbanomic, 2023. ISBN 9781913029999.
- The New Normal (co-edited with Nicolay Boyadjiev and Nick Axel) Strelka/Park 2020. ISBN 9783038602200.

=== Articles ===
- "Logistics of Habitable Circulation". Introduction to Speed and Politics, by Paul Virilio. Semiotext(e) Foreign Agents Series, 2006. ISBN 9781584350408.
- "The Black Stack". e-flux Journal, no. 53, March 2014.
- "iPhone City". Architectural Design 85, no. 1, 2015: 102–107.
- "Outing AI", New York Times, February 23, 2015.
- "Outing Artificial Intelligence. Reckoning with Turing Tests" in Pasquinelli, Matteo: Alleys of Your Mind. Augmented Intelligence and Its Traumas. Meson Press E.g. 2015, p. 69-80.ISBN 3957960657.
- "On Anthropolysis". e-flux Architecture: Superhumanity, January 2017.
- "The City Wears Us: Notes on the Scope of Distributed Sensing and Sensation". Glass Bead. 2017
- "Planetary Sapience". Noema, June 17, 2021.
- "Synthetic Garden: Another Model of AI" Atlas of Anomalous AI. Edited by Ben Vickers and Kenric McDowell, Ignota Books. 2021. ISBN 978-1999675950.
- Bratton, Benjamin, and Blaise Agüera y Arcas. "The Model Is the Message". Noema, July 12, 2022.
- "On Hemispherical Stacks". Vertical Atlas. Edited by Leonardo Dellanoce, Amal Khalaf, Klaas Kuitenbrouwer, Nanjala Nyabola, Renée Roukens, Arthur Steiner and Mi You. pages 168–175, March 2022.
- "The Stack at the Edge of Planetarity: Convergence, Divergence, and War". Vertical Atlas. Edited by Leonardo Dellanoce, Amal Khalaf, Klaas Kuitenbrouwer, Nanjala Nyabola, Renée Roukens, Arthur Steiner and Mi You. pages 270-278, March 2022.
- "Not Right Now: On Immediacy and the Ironies of Life in a Hypermediated World". TANK Magazine, Issue 98. 2024.
- "Stages of AI Grief". Noema. June 20, 2024.
