= SAMU Social =

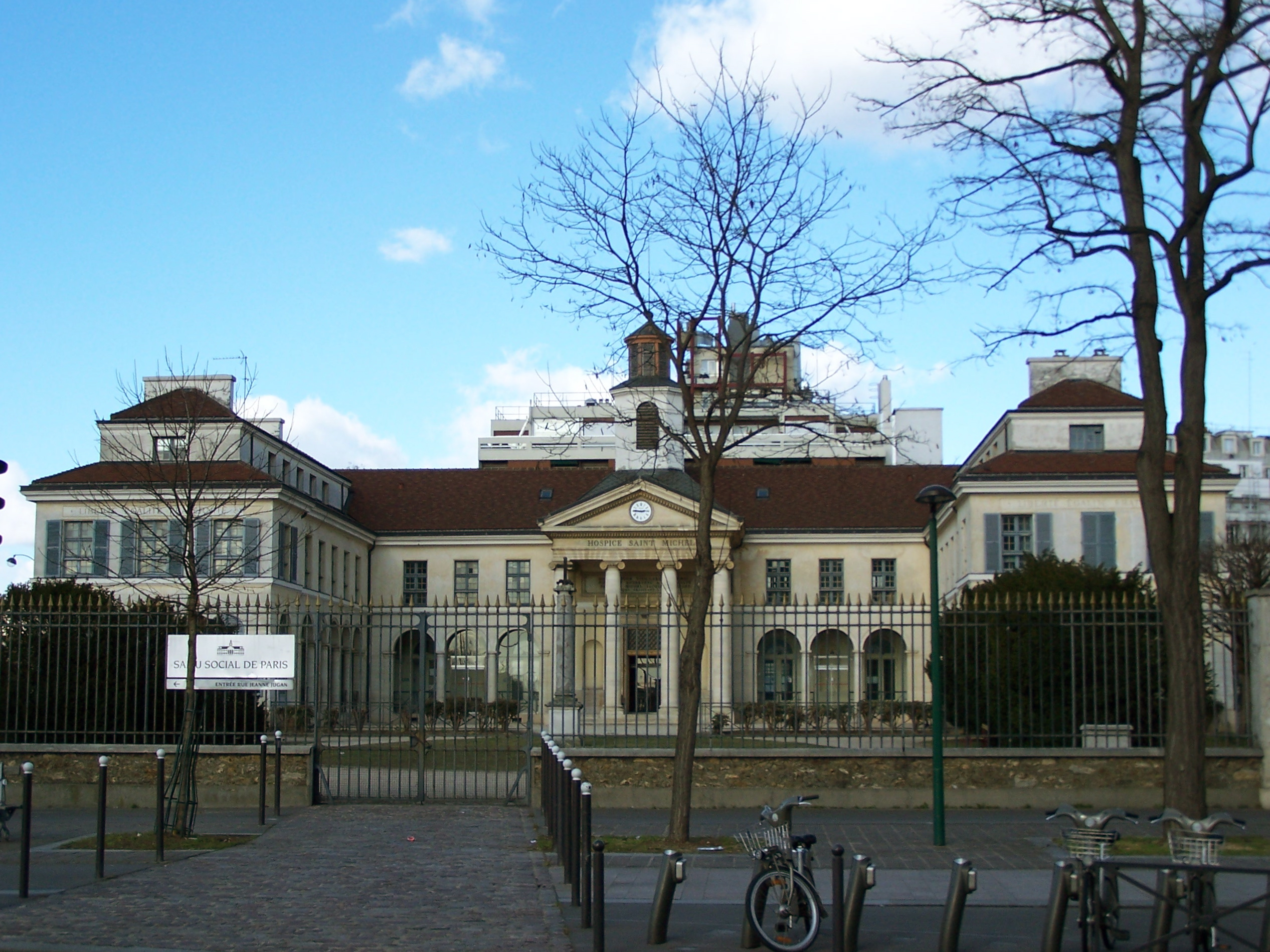
The former Hospice Saint-Michel, 35 Avenue Courteline, current site of the SAMU Social of Paris

A SAMU Social (Service d'Aide Mobile d'Urgence) is a municipal humanitarian emergency service in several cities in France and worldwide whose purpose is to provide care and medical ambulatory aid and nursing to homeless people and people in social distress. This is partially accomplished via mobile units which distribute food, hot drinks, blankets, etc. Its nickname has been not well accepted because it bears confusion with a SAMU (Service d'Aide Médicale Urgente), which is an ambulance service.

The SAMU Social de Paris lists the following goals as its mission:

- At night: mobile assistance teams
- 24-hour management of the 1-1-5 emergency telephone number for Homeless people alert.
- 24-hour emergency shelters with nursing care
- During the day: reception at the "Solidarity-Insertion-Centre"
- Increase the scientific knowledge of impoverished populations, from precarious situations to total exclusion, by identifying and analysing the sanitary and social problematic
- Observing the phenomenon of wanderings, by establishing a typology of populations, tracking their paths and monitoring the social indicators

The name comes from SAMU ( service d'aide médicale urgente, "emergency medical assistance service") which in reality and by law is the French Medical Regulation of Emergencies Center based in Hospitals and which role is to regulate the medical Emergency Fluxes of demands Medicosanitary Regulation of Emergencies of a Public Health Integrated Emergency Medical System (IEMS); the acronym has become a kind of popular informal word, synonym to emergency action because it is the mark labelling Mobile Intensive Care Unit Ambulances in France. A new origin was proposed to this acronym as used in this appellation : service ambulatoire d'urgences because conflictual with the SAMU that is woldwild an official Puvblic Service appellation and because it is neither a Medical Emergency Service nor a true "Social Emergency Service".

On July 19, 2011, Xavier Emmanuelli resigned from the presidency following the State's announcement of drastic reductions in the resources allocated to emergency accommodation. However, he will continue his action at the Samu social International. This decision will be followed by a strike by social emergency professionals on August 2, 2011.
