= Strelka Institute =

Architecture school in Moscow

Coordinates: 55.742665°N 37.609086°E

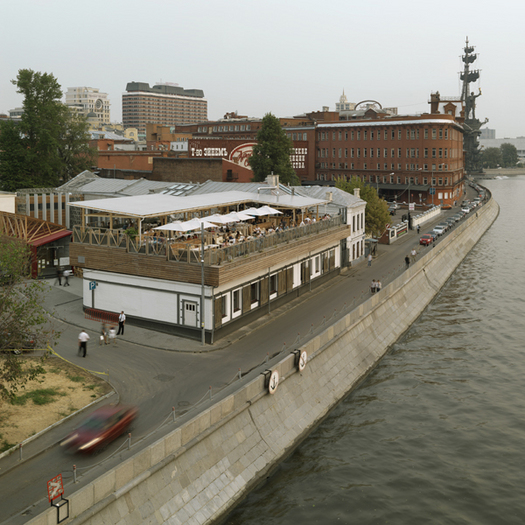
Strelka Institute

Strelka Institute for Media, Architecture and Design is a non-profit international educational project, founded in 2009 and located in Moscow. Strelka incorporates an education programme on urbanism and urban development aimed at professionals with a higher education, a public summer programme, the Strelka Press publishing house, and KB Strelka, the consulting arm of the Institute. Strelka has been listed among the top-100 best architecture schools in 2014, according to Domus magazine.

The Institute has been directed since 2013 by Varvara Melnikova. After the start of the Russian invasion of Ukraine in 2022, Strelka suspended its operations.

== Education programme ==
The Institute aims to educate the next generation of architects, designers and media professionals, enabling them to shape the 21st century world. Each year, Strelka welcomes young professionals and gives them the opportunity to work together with experts in the fields of urbanism, architecture and communications from all over the world. During this nine-month post-graduate programme, the researchers explore the issues related to Russia's urban development through a multidisciplinary method conducted in English. Experimental methods, a holistic approach to architecture, media and design, and an emphasis on research are the main characteristics of the programme. The prominent architect and architecture theorist, Rem Koolhaas (AMO/OMA), contributed to the designing of the Institute's education programme.

Between 2016 and 2022, Benjamin H. Bratton, design theorist and author of The Stack: On Software and Sovereignty, was director of design research programmes The New Normal (2017-2019) and The Terraforming (2020-2022). While The New Normal conducted collaborative research to investigate the impact of planetary-scale computation on the future of cities, and focused on the new contemporary condition created by the rapid development of technologies such as machine intelligence, biotechnology, automation, VR and AR, The Terraforming pivoted to the questions of urbanism at a planetary scale, exploring the technologically mediated shift away from anthropocentric perspectives in both theory and practice.

Some notable faculty at the Strelka Institute have been: Keller Easterling, Blaise Agüera y Arcas, Benjamin H. Bratton, Winy Maas, Joseph Grima, Reinier De Graaf, Carlo Ratti, Stefano Boeri, Trevor Paglen, and Rem Koolhaas.

== KB Strelka ==
KB Strelka provides strategic consulting services in the fields of architecture and urban planning, as well as cultural and spatial programming. The company was founded in 2013 by the executive board of the Strelka Institute. KB’s method is based on the implementation of transparent competition procedures, involving international experts, forecasting of expenses, and risk analysis at the early stages of project realisation. In 2013, KB organised several key international competitions for Russia: Zaryadye Park, the National Centre for Contemporary Arts, the Museum and Educational Centre of the Polytechnic Museum and Lomonosov Moscow State University, and the International Financial Centre in Rublyovo-Arkhangelskoye. Despite transparency efforts, KB Strelka's urbanisation projects in different cities in Russia have received criticism for the costs and the methods employed; such as the violent clearing of small street kiosks, corruption or incompetent design.

== Summer at Strelka ==
From the end of May until mid September, Strelka’s courtyard hosts a public programme that is open to all. Its programme includes: lectures by prominent architects, urbanists, designers, social activists and scholars; discussions on topical urban issues; workshops; film screenings; theatre performances; concerts and fairs.

== Strelka Press ==
Strelka Press publishes books and essays on modern issues of architecture, design and urban development in both English and Russian. The publishing house releases both printed and digital books. Strelka Press is based in London and Moscow. Strelka Press has published books by Donald Norman, Keller Easterling, Pier Vittorio Aureli and others.

== Other information ==
- Strelka is curating the Russian pavilion for the XIV Venice Architectural Biennale.
- Strelka took part in the renovation of Moscow’s Gorky Park, designed the concept for Big Moscow development project, and framed the programme for the Moscow Urban Forum 2012-2013.
- In 2013, Strelka launched What Moscow Wants, an on-line platform to crowdsource ideas for improving the development of Moscow.
